= Uhlemann =

Uhlemann is a surname of German origin. Notable people with the surname include:

- Detlef Uhlemann (born 1949), former West German distance runner
- Friedrich Gottlob Uhlemann (1792–1864), German theologian and writer
- Max Uhlemann (died 1862), German Egyptologist

== See also ==
- Uhlmann
