= Erzgebirgisch =

Central German dialect

- Arzgebirgsch
- Pronunciation: [ˈaːɰtsɡ̊əˌb̥ɛːɰjɡ̊ʃ]
- Native to: Germany
- Region: Saxony, Lower Saxony
- Language family: Indo-European: Germanic; West Germanic; High German; Central German; East Central German; Erzgebirgisch
- Early forms: Proto-Indo-European: Proto-Germanic; Old Thuringian

Language codes
- ISO 639-3: –
- Glottolog: oste1245 Osterzgebirgisch west2915 Westerzgebirgisch
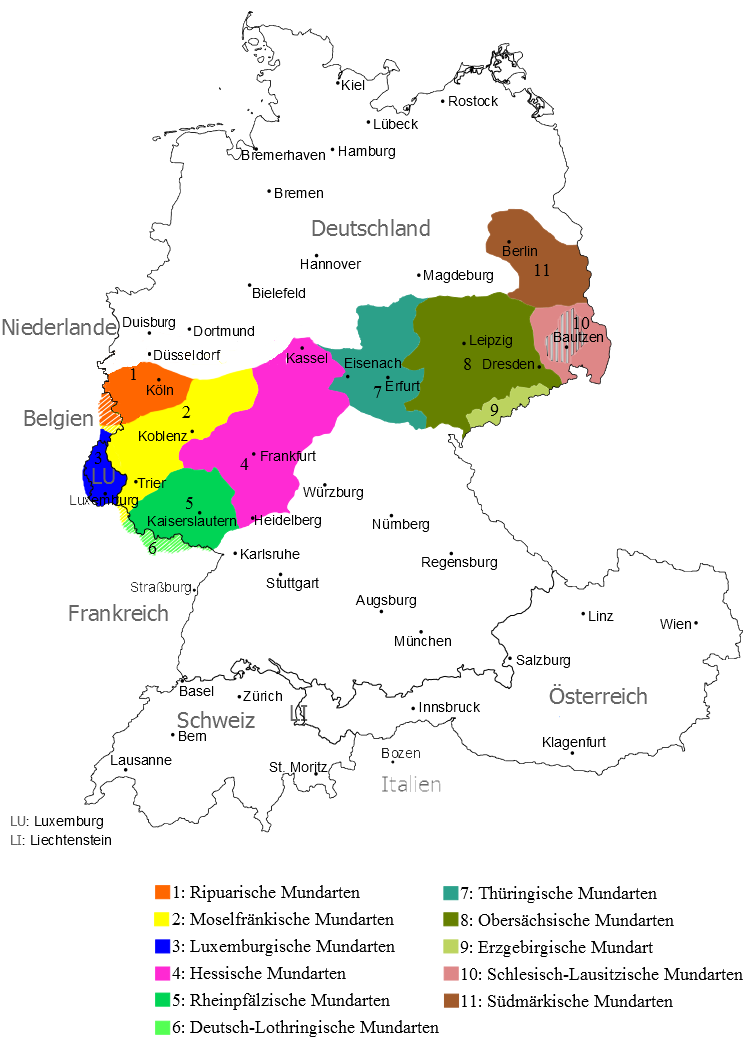
- Central German dialects after 1945 and the expulsions of the Germans Erzgebirgisch (9)

Erzgebirgisch (Standard German pronunciation: [ˈeːɐ̯tsɡəˌbɪɐ̯ɡɪʃ]; Erzgebirgisch: Arzgebirgsch) is a (East) Central German dialect, spoken mainly in the central Ore Mountains in Saxony. It has received relatively little academic attention. Due to the high mobility of the population and the resulting contact with Upper Saxon, the high emigration rate and its low mutual intelligibility with other dialects, the number of speakers is decreasing.

== Language area and history ==
As the following sections will show, Erzgebirgisch is very close to Upper Saxon but also has commonalities with Upper German dialects.

As of today, the Erzgebirgisch area comprises roughly the districts of Mittweida (southern area), Stollberg, Central Ore Mountain District, Annaberg-Buchholz, Freiberg (South) and Aue-Schwarzenberg. Some more speakers live in the town of Lichtenstein, in the Chemnitzer Land district.

Another community live in the Upper Harz Mountains in the Clausthal-Zellerfeld region (Lower Saxony). Their ancestors were miners and emigrated in the 16th century. Here it is referred to as the Upper Harz dialect.

Up to 1929, Erzgebirgisch was also spoken in other parts of Mittweida and Freiberg, in Chemnitz, Zwickau and in the extreme West of the Weißeritzkreis, but these areas are now dominated by Thuringian–Upper Saxon dialects.

Until 1945, the bordering Sudetenland also harbored some Erzgebirgisch speakers, namely in the Kaaden-Duppau area, in whose dialect an anthology of words, proverbs and anecdotes was published (see references). After World War II these speakers had to leave Czechoslovakia and settled down all over the FRG and the GDR. This meant that dialect usage was reduced to the family homes, entailing a shift to the local varieties of their new home towns.

No official attempts to create an orthography have been made, nevertheless there are countless short stories, poems and songs written in Erzgebirgisch. The Sächsischer Heimatverein guidelines to writing in Erzgebirgisch were established in 1937, but are by and large not respected by the majority of authors. This means that linguistic analysis of this dialect has to be done in a field work setting with native speakers. An additional threat to Erzgebirgisch is the popular misconception that Erzgebirgisch was a hillbilly variety of Saxonian, which is an issue for conservation efforts.

Erzgebirgisch is classified as a Central German dialect in linguistics, but also includes Upper German features.

=== Linguistic features ===
Many of these languages show a tendency to substitute the German verbal prefix er- by der- (Erzg. and Bair.) or ver- (Bair. and Swabian). (e.g. westerzgeb. derschloong [tɔɰˈʃloːŋ] German erschlagen 'to slaughter'; derzeeln [tɔɰˈtseːln] German erzählen 'to tell, to narrate').

Extended use of the particle fei is typical for Upper German and popular in Erzgebirgisch.

Furthermore, German [o/ɔ] corresponds to [u/ʊ] in the mentioned varieties (e.g. westerzgeb. huus [huːs] Hose), and German [a] corresponds to [A].

An [n] in the coda, following a long vowel, is regularly deleted in Erzgebirgisch (e.g. Lichtenst. Huuschdee [huːʂʈeː] Hohenstein. Rarely, this is also found with monosyllabic words with a short vowel, which undergo compensatory vowel lengthening in the process (e.g. Lichtenst. màà [mʌː] Mann 'man').

Another typical feature of Upper German is the apocope of schwa and /ɪ/ (e.g. Lichtenst. Reedlz [ɣeːtˡl̩ts] Rödlitz)

The following table illustrates the similarities between Erzgebirgisch and Upper German dialects. Thuringian/Upper Saxon is listed as a control parameter. Areas marked with a tick means that the feature is present in most subdialects, whereas areas marked as 'partial' are only found in border areas.

Feature	Erzgebirgisch	East Franconian	Bavarian-Austrian	Alemannic	Thuringian
Rendering of er- as der-/ver-	Yes	Yes	Yes	Yes	No
Use of fei	Yes	Yes	Yes	Yes	No
Pronunciation of [o/ɔ] as [u/ʊ]	Yes	Yes	Yes	Partial	No
N-apocope	Yes	Yes	Yes	Yes	No
Schwa-apocope	Yes	Yes	Yes	Yes	Partial
Convergence of ch and sch	Partial	No	No	No	Yes

== Subdialects ==
Eastern Erzgebirgisch dialects indicate negation with ni(ch) [nɪ(ç)] whereas nèt [nɛt] is used in the West. However, this subdialectal boundary is not clearly demarcated. Thus, both forms are found in the town of Lichtenstein, which lies on the northwestern dialect boundary (although ni is perhaps more common).

In both Eastern Erzgebirgisch and in the Lichtenstein dialect, word-initial clusters ⟨kl/gl⟩ and ⟨kn/gn⟩ in Standard German as realized as ⟨tl⟩ and ⟨tn⟩ respectively (e.g. dlee [tˡleː] klein 'small'; dnuchng [ˈtⁿnʊxŋ̍] Knochen 'bone').

It is not possible to include the Upper Harz varieties in either of these groups. Furthermore, there is a strong influence from the neighbouring non-Erzgebirgisch dialects in the region bordering Meißenisch, which makes subclassification cumbersome.

Through the summarizing of these findings, four dialects can be listed:

Dialect	Present area	Historic area
Eastern Erzgebirgisch	Mittlerer Erzgebirgskreis, districts of Annaberg (northern half), Mittweida (south), Freiberg (south)	districts of Freiberg (northwest), Mittweida (west), Dippoldiswalde (western fringe), City of Chemnitz, Sudetenland (around Katharinaberg)
Western Erzgebirgisch	Districts of Aue-Schwarzenberg, Annaberg (southern half)	Sudetenland (triangle from Graslitz through Schlaggenwalde to Pressnitz)
Northern Erzgebirgisch	Rural districts of Chemnitzer Land (Region Lichtenstein), Stollberg	City and Rural District of Zwickau
Upper Harzisch	Clausthal-Zellerfeld Region and Sankt Andreasberg (Lower Saxony)	

== Phonology ==
As mentioned above, there is no unified orthography. In order to render the language data close to their actual pronunciation, the following conventions have been established:

=== Consonants ===
The rendering of the consonants follows the notation commonly used for Bavarian. The following table lists the phonemes of the most important Erzgebirgisch dialects, with the IPA value and the corresponding character used in this article.

		Labial	Alveolar	Postalveolar/ Retroflex	Palatal	Velar	Uvular	Glottal
Stop	aspirated					kʰ ⟨k⟩		
Stop	unaspirated	p ⟨b⟩	t ⟨d⟩			k ⟨g⟩		
Affricate		pf ⟨pf⟩	ts ⟨z⟩	tʃ / tʂ ⟨tsch⟩				
Fricative	voiceless	f ⟨f⟩	s ⟨s⟩	ʃ/ʂ ⟨sch⟩	ç ⟨ch⟩	x ⟨ch⟩	χ ⟨ch⟩	h ⟨h⟩
Fricative	voiced	v ⟨w⟩				ɣ ⟨r⟩		
Nasal		m ⟨m⟩	n ⟨n⟩			ŋ ⟨ng⟩		
Lateral			l ⟨l⟩					
Approximant					j ⟨j⟩	ɰ ⟨r⟩		

- No subdialect shows phonemic contrast between postalveolar [tʃ, ʃ]) and retroflex [tʂ, ʂ]; they have one or the other.
- An important sound change in Erzgebirgisch is found with respect to /r/. When /r/ precedes a velar consonant, a [j] is inserted in between, as an example, Baarg (German Berg 'mountain') is pronounced [paːɰjk]. Since this phonological process is completely regular, it is not reflected in orthography.
- [ɰ] is normally realized as a velarization of the preceding vowel. However, for the sake of clarity, this article will use [ɰ] throughout.

=== Vowels ===
The writing of the vowels presented here follows in part the official Schwyzertütsch orthography. The orthographic representation of a vowel follows after the IPA characters, if different.

	Front	Central	Back	
	Front	Central	unrounded	rounded
Close	i ⟨i⟩			u ⟨u⟩
Near-close	ɪ ⟨i⟩			ʊ ⟨u⟩
(Close-)mid	e ⟨e⟩	ə ⟨e⟩		o ⟨o⟩
Open-mid	ɛ ⟨è⟩		ʌ ⟨à⟩	ɔ ⟨e/o⟩
(Near-)open	æ~a ⟨a⟩			

- No subdialect has both [a] and [æ].
- /ə/ followed by ⟨r⟩ is pronounced as [ɔ], but still written as ⟨e⟩.
- The close back vowels [u, ʊ] are often rather unrounded.
- Vowel length is indicated by doubling the vowel sign in writing: ⟨aa⟩, ⟨àà⟩, ⟨ee⟩, ⟨èè⟩, ⟨ii⟩, ⟨oo⟩, ⟨uu⟩.
- All vowels (with the exception of ⟨a⟩ and /ə/) are angbr, i.e. that the back vowels ⟨à⟩, ⟨o⟩, ⟨u⟩ are more front, and the front vowels ⟨ee⟩, ⟨è⟩ und ⟨i⟩ more back than in Standard German.
- Short vowels preceding a stressed syllable are reduced to a schwa (e.g. gremàdig [kxəˈmʌtɪk] Grammatik 'grammar').
- A short vowel preceding a r is lengthened (e.g. Aarzgebèèrgsch).
- In dialects spoken at higher altitudes, ⟨àà⟩ is often realized like ⟨oo⟩.
  - The pronunciation as ⟨àà⟩ is the default case for closed syllables. This might be due to overgeneralization of a pattern found in adjacent Saxonian dialects.

=== Stress ===
Erzgebirgisch has lexical stress. There is a tendency to stress the first syllable even in French loanwords, where Standard German stresses the final syllable (e.g. biro [ˈpiːɣo] ⟨Büro⟩ 'office'), but loan words which follow the Standard German pattern are more numerous (e.g. dridewààr [txɪtəˈvʌːɰ] Gehsteig 'sidewalk' (from French trottoir)).

== Morphology ==
=== Nominal morphology ===
==== Gender ====
Erzgebirgisch numbers three genders, masculine, feminine and neuter. Most Erzgebirgisch lexemes have the same gender as their Standard German equivalents.

Gender	Erzgebirgisch	Standard German	Gloss (sg./pl.)
masculine	màà	Mann (m.)	man/men
	gung	Junge (m.)	boy/boys
	baam	Baum (m.)	tree/trees
feminine	fraa	Frau (f.)	woman/women
	sub	Suppe (f.)	soup/soups
	dàsch	Tasche (f.)	bag/bags
neuter	kind	Kind (n.)	child/children
	dridewààr	Gehsteig (m.)	sidewalk
	dunl	Tunnel (m./n.)	tunnel

==== Case ====
In distinction to Standard German, the Erzgebirgisch genitive is no longer productive. Other constructions have to be used to indicate possession. For animate possessors, a construction involving the possessor in the dative and an agreeing possessive pronoun is used (dem B sein A). For inanimate possessors, a construction involving f(u)n (German von) is used. A third possibility is compounding.

examples (North Western dialect):

(1)	n'Hàns	seine	hitsch
	de-m Hans	seine	Fuß-bank
	the-GEN. Hans	his	foot-bench
	"Hans's foot bench"

(2)	de	fansder	fun	den	haus
	the	windows	of	the	house
	die	Fenster	des	Hauses		(Standard German - genitive)
	"The windows of the house"

The only case marking available for nouns is dative plural, which is marked by -n , but can often assimilate to other consonants. Nominative and accusative are not marked in the singular on nouns, but articles, adjectives and possessive pronouns help to disambiguate in these cases. Personal pronouns also have some special forms for nominative, accusative and dative.

The following table shows some Erzgebirgisch nominal declension paradigms.

Case/Number	tree (m.)	bag (f.)	child (n.)
Nominative singular	der baam	de dàsch	s kind
Dative singular	n baam	der dàsch	n kind
Accusative singular	n baam	de dàsch	s kind
Nominative plural	de beeme	de dàschn	de kiner
Dative plural	n beemm	n dàschn	n kinern
Accusative plural	de beeme	de dàschn	de kiner

For more information on articles, see below.

==== Number ====
There are different ways to form the plural in Erzgebirgisch, a feature shared with Standard German. Next to the suffixes -e, -er, -n and -s, ablaut can also be used. Some suffixes trigger umlaut.

There are some nouns which differ in their plural marking between Erzgebirgisch and Standard German. E.g. Erzgebirgisch has -n for nouns ending in -(e)l in the singular, where Standard German most often has umlaut.

Examples (North Western dialect):

singular (Erzg.)	singular (Std.G.)	plural (Erzg.)	plural (Std.G.)	gloss
fuuchl	Vogel	fuuchl-n	Vögel	birds
nààchl	Nagel	nààchl-n	Nägel	nails
maadl	Mädchen	maadl-n	Mädchen	girls
màst	Mast	masd-e (along with mosd-n)	Masten	masts
kind	Kind	kin-er	Kinder	children
bàrg	Park	bààrg-s	Parks	parks
fuus	Fuß	fiis	Füße	feet
wààng	Wagen	weeng(-e)	Wagen	coaches

==== Articles ====
Erzgebirgisch distinguishes three kinds of articles: emphatic definite article, atonal definite article, indefinite article. The emphatic definite articles are used where Standard German would use deictics like dieser and jener. The other two types closely resemble their Standard German counterparts.

All articles agree in gender, number and case with their head noun. The emphatic articles may also occur without a head noun and often replace the rarely used third person personal pronouns.

Erzgebirgisch has a negative indefinite article just like German, but the similarity to the positive indefinite article is less obvious.

The North-Western dialect has the following forms:

Form	masculine	feminine	neuter
indefinite article
Nominative singular	e	ne	e
Dative singular	n	ner	n
Accusative singular	n	ne	e
non-stressed definite article
Nominative singular	der	de	s
Dative singular	(de)n	der	(de)n
Accusative singular	(de)n	de	s
Nominative plural	de		
Dative plural	n		
Accusative plural	de		
stressed definite article
Nominative singular	daar	dii	dàs
Dative singular	daan/dèèn	daar	daan/dèèn
Accusative singular	daan/dèèn	dii	dàs
Nominative plural	dii		
Dative plural	daann/dèènn		
Accusative plural	dii		
negative article
Nominative singular	kee	keene	kee
Dative singular	keen	keener	keen
Accusative singular	keen	keene	kee
Nominative plural	keene		
Dative plural	keenn		
Accusative plural	keene		

The article n assimilates in place of articulation to the preceding consonant. It is m before p, pf, f, w and m and ng before k, g, ch ([x] or [χ]) and ng.

Examples:

(3)	S	kind	hàd	s	n	Hàns	gesààd
	[skʰɪnt]		[hʌtsn̩]			[hʌns]	[kəsʌːt]
	Das	Kind	hat	es/dieses	einem	Hans	gesagt.
	The	child	has	it/that	to a	Hans	said.

(4)	Der	Hàns	hàd	dàs	buuch	ng	màà	gaam
	[tɔɰ]	[hʌns]	[hʌt]	[tʌs]	[puːxŋ̍]		[mʌː]	[kæːm]
	Der	Hans	hat	dieses	Buch	einem	Mann	gegeben.
	The	Hans	has	this	book	to a	man	given.

(5)	E	schiins	dleedl	hàd	dii	àà
	[ə]	[ʂiːns]	[tˡleːtˡl̩]	[hʌt]	[tiː]	[ʌː]
	Ein	schönes	Kleidchen	hat	sie/diese	an.
	A	beautiful	dress.DIM	has	she/this one	on.

(6)	Ch	hàb	m	kinern	kee	gald	gaam
	[ʂhʌpm̩]			[kʰɪnɔɰn]	[kʰeː]	[kælt]	[kæːm]
	Ich	habe	den	Kindern	kein	Geld	gegeben.
	I	have	the	children	no	money	given.

=== Pronouns ===
==== Personal pronouns ====
Personal pronouns distinguish emphatic and atonal forms, just like articles. The emphatic forms are used to highlight a participant. They are free words, whereas the atonal forms are phonologically reduced clitics.

There is no emphatic form for third person personal pronouns. The emphatic forms of the definite article have to be used instead. To outsiders this may often come across as impolite.

Unlike nouns, personal pronouns distinguish both number and case.

Person/Number/Gender	Nominative	Dative	Accusative
emphatic personal pronouns
1. Person singular	iich	miir	miich
2. Person singular	duu	diir	diich
3. Person singular m.	daar	daan/dèèn	dann/dèèn
3. Person singular f.	dii	daar	dii
3. Person singular n.	dàs	daan/dèèn	dàs
1. Person plural	miir	uns	uns
2. Person plural	iir	eich	eich
3. Person plural	dii	daann/dèènn	dii
Polite	sii	iinn	sii
atonal personal pronouns
1. Person singular	(i)ch	mer	mich
2. Person singular	de/du	der	dich/tsch
3. Person singular m.	er	n	n
3. Person singular f.	se	er	se
3. Person singular n.	s	n	s
1. Person plural	mer	uns	uns
2. Person plural	er	eich	eich
3. Person plural	se	n	se
Polite	se	iin(n)	se

Pronouns with ch have sch in the Northwestern dialect. The atonal second person singular pronoun is de when it precedes a verb, and du when following. There are extra pronouns to express politeness, unlike German, which uses third person plural for this function.

Examples:

(7)	Hàd	-er	-s	-n	schuu	gesààd
	[hʌtɔɰsn̩]				[ʂuː]	[kəsʌːt]
	Hat	er	es	ihm	schon	gesagt?
	Has	he	it	to him	already	said?

(8)	Ch	hàb	dèènn	nischd	gaam
	[ʂhʌp]		[tɛːnn̩]	[nɪʂt]	[kæːm]
	Ich	habe	denen/ihnen	nichts	gegeben.
	I	have	those ones/them	nothing	given.

==== Possessive pronouns ====
Possessive pronouns agree in case, number and gender with their head noun.

Person/Genus	singular	plural
1. Person	mei(n)-	un(s)(e)r-
2. Person	dei(n)-	ei(e)r-
3. Person masc..	sei(n)-	iir-
3. Person fem.	iir-	iir-
3. Person neut.	sei(n)-	iir-

singular pronouns lose the n before another n or a -Ø-suffix.

First person plural loses the s everywhere but in the North Western dialect. First and second person plural lose the e before a suffix starting with a vowel.

Form	masculine	feminine	neuter
Nominative singular	-Ø	-e	-Ø
Dative singular	-n	-er	-n
Accusative singular	-n	-e	-Ø
Nominative plural	-e		
Dative plural	-n		
Accusative plural	-e		

This paradigm makes use of only three letters e, n and r.

examples:

(9)	mei	hund
	[maɪ]	[hʊnt]
	mein	Hund
	my	dog

(10)	eirer	schwasder
	[aɪɣɔɰ]	[ʂvastɔɰ]
	eurer	Schwester
	to y'all's	sister

Third person pronouns make heavy use of the dative construction (see above), just like nouns.

(11)	daar	iire	dàsch
	[taːɰ]	[iːɣə]	[tʌʂ]
	dieser/ihr	ihre	Tasche
	this one/her	her	bag
	"her bag"

vgl.:

(12)	daar	fraa	iire	dàsch
	"die Tasche dieser Frau"
	"The woman's bag"

=== Prepositions ===
The following construction is found mainly in Western dialects, but also in Lichtenstein:

(13)	nei	(n)	der	schdàd
	hinein	in	der	Stadt
	inwards	in	the	town
	"in die Stadt (hinein)"
	"inwards in the town"

The canonic preposition n (in) is never deleted in Lichtenstein, but almost always in the western dialects due to the more widespread dropping of n. This leads to the impression that nei is the preposition. One should also notice that goal of motion is encoded by the dative, and not by the accusative as in Standard German. The motion component is expressed by nei. This construction is also found with many other prepositions: dràà der kèrch ("an der Kirche", "bei der Kirche" at the church).

=== Adjectives ===
==== Agreement ====
Adjectives agree with their head word in case, number, gender and definiteness. A difference to Standard German is the non-distinction of forms with indefinite article and forms without any article.

Standard German	Erzgebirgisch	English
teur-em Schmuck	deier-n schmuk	for expensive jewels
einem teur-en Ring	n'deier-n ring	for an expensive ring

The following table lists all agreement suffixes for adjectives:

Form	masculine	feminine	neuter
without article/with indefinite article
Nominative singular	-er	-e	-(e)s
Dative singular	-n	-er	-n
Accusative singular	-n	-e	-(e)s
Nominative plural	-e		
Dative plural	-n		
Accusative plural	-e		
with definite article
Nominative singular	-e	-e	-e
Dative singular	-n	-n	-n
Accusative singular	-n	-e	-e
Nominative plural	-n		
Dative plural	-n		
Accusative plural	-n		

More examples

(14)	e	gruus-er	màà
	[ə]	[kxuːsɔɰ]	[mʌː]
	ein	großer	Mann
	a	big	man

(15)	daar	schiin-n	fraa
	[taːɰ]	[ʂiːnn̩]	[fxaː]
	dieser	schönen	Frau
	this	beautiful	woman
	to this beautiful woman

==== Comparison ====
The comparative is formed with the suffix -er. The standard of comparison is marked with the preposition wii (wie).
The superlative is obtained by adding -(e)sd. Agreement suffixes come after these suffixes.

examples:

(16)	e	grès-(e)r-er	màà	wii	daar
	[ə]	[kxɛsɔɣɔɰ]	[mʌː]	[viː]	[taːɰ]
	ein	größ-er-er	Mann	als	er/dieser
	a	bigger	man	than	he/this one

(17)	der	schèn-sd-n	fraa
	[tɔɰ]	[ʂɛnstn̩]	[fxaː]
	der	schönsten	Frau
	to the	prettiest	woman

=== Verbs ===
The verb agrees in person and number with the subject of the sentence. This is true of both full verbs and auxiliaries.

Two tense/aspects are morphologically distinguished, present tense and preterite. Use of the preterite is found almost exclusively with strong verbs, i.e. verbs involving ablaut.

The other tenses are formed with auxiliaries: Perfect, Pluperfect, Futur I and Futur II. Perfect and preterite are used interchangeably. Pluperfect expresses anteriority in the past. Futur II is mainly used for epistemic statements about past events (cf. German: Er wird wohl wieder nicht da gewesen sein. He has probably not attended again.)

==== Infinitive and participles ====
The infinitive and the present participle and the past participle are formed with the following affixes:

Form	schbiil-	gii-	sei-	hàb-	wèèr-
class	weak	strong	irregular	irregular	irregular
Std.G.	spiel-	geh-	sei-	hab-	werd-
Engl.	play	go	be	have	become
Infinitive	schbiil-n	gii-n	sei(-n)	hà-m	wèèr-n
participle I	schbiil-end	gii-end	sei-end	hàà-md	wèèr-nd
participle II	ge-schbiil-d	(ge-)gàng-ng	ge-waas-n	ge-hà-d	ge-wur-n

==== Present tense ====
Erzgebirgisch distinguishes strong verbs, involving ablaut, and weak verbs, without ablaut. Both classes take the same suffixes. The present tense can be used to refer to events in the present or future.

Form	schbiil-	gii-	sei-	hàb-	wèèr-
class	weak	strong	irregular	irregular	irregular
Std.G.	spiel-	geh-	sei-	hab-	werd-
Engl.	play	go	be	have	become
1. Person singular	schbiil-∅	gii-∅	bii-∅	hàb-∅	wèèr-∅
2. Person singular	schbiil-sd	gi(i)-sd	bi-sd	hà-sd	wèr-sd
3. Person singular	schbiil-d	gi(i)-d	is	hà-d	wèr-d
1. Person plural	schbiil-n	gii-n	sei-∅	hà-m	wèèr-n
2. Person plural	schbiil-d	gii-d	sei-d	hàb-d	wèèr-d
3. Person plural	schbiil-n	gii-n	sei-∅	hà-m	wèèr-n

The suffixes are sometimes assimilated to the stem, as can be seen from hàm, `to have'.

==== Preterite ====
As mentioned above, the preterite form is only used with strong verbs. Weak verbs use the perfect instead. This is also gaining ground with strong verbs. Formation of the preterite does not always follow the same pattern as in Standard German e.g. schmecken `to taste' is a weak verb in Standard German (preterit schmeckte), but a strong verb is Erzgebirgisch (present tense: schmègng preterite: schmoog with ablaut. Another verb which is weak in Standard German but strong in Erzgebirgisch is frààn (Standard German fragen to ask), preterite fruuch (Standard German fragte, asked).

Agreement with the subject is indicated as follows:

Form	gii-	sei-	hàb-	wèèr-
class	strong	irregular	irregular	irregular
Stg.G.	geh-	sei-	hab-	werd-
Engl.	go	be	have	become
1. Person singular	ging-∅	wààr-∅	hàd-∅	wurd-∅
2. Person singular	ging-sd	wààr-sd	hàd-sd	wurd-sd
3. Person singular	ging-∅	wààr-∅	hàd-e	wurd-e
1. Person plural	ging-ng	wààr-n	hàd-n	wurd-n
2. Person plural	ging-d	wààr-d	hàd-ed	wurd-ed
3. Person plural	ging-ng	wààr-n	hàd-n	wurd-n

==== Perfect, pluperfect ====
Perfect and pluperfect are construed with a finite form of the auxiliaries sei- and hàb- and the past participle of the full verb.

Examples:

(18)	Miir	sei	gasdern	(a)f	der	kèèrms	gàngng
	[miːɰ]	[saɪ]	[kæstɔɰn]	[(a/ə)f]	[tɔɰ]	[kʰɛːɰms]	[kʌŋŋ̍]
	Wir	sind	gestern	auf	der	Kirmes	gegangen.
	We	are	yesterday	on	the	funfair	gone.

(19)	Ch	hàd	-s	-n	ààwer	gesààd
	[ʂhʌtsn̩]				[ʌːvɔɰ]	[kəsʌːt]
	Ich	hatte	es	ihm	aber	gesagt.
	I	had	it	him	nevertheless	said.

==== Future ====
Two future tenses are distinguished. Future I is used for any reference time in the future, Future II has the meaning of future anterior. Future is formed with the auxiliary wèèr- (Standard German werden). Future I adds the infinitive of the full verb, future II the auxiliary sei or hab in the infinitive and the past participle of the full verb.

Examples:

(20)	Murng	wèrd	der	Hàns	nààch	Kams	fààrn
	[moːɰjŋ]	[vɛɰt]	[tɔɰ]	[hʌns]	[nʌːχ]	[kʰæms]	[fʌːɰn]
	Morgen	wird	der	Hans	nach	Chemnitz	fahren.
	Tomorrow	will	the	Hans	to	Chemnitz	go.

(21)	Er	wèrd	wuu	wiider	nèd	doo	gewaasn	sei
	[ɔɰ]	[vɛɰt]	[vuː]	[viːtɔɰ]	[nɛt]	[toː]	[kəvaːsn̩]	[saɪ]
	Er	wird	wohl	wieder	nicht	da	gewesen	sein.
	He	will	rather	again	not	there	been	be.

==== Subjunctive ====
Erzgebirgisch has a productive subjunctive for most of the auxiliaries and some other frequently used verbs. The form is derived from the preterite by ablaut. Other verbs have to use duun support in order to appear in the subjunctive.

Form	gii-	sei-	hàb-	wèèr-
class	strong	irregular	irregular	irregular
Std.G.	geh-	sei-	hab-	werd-
Engl.	go	be	have	become
1. Person singular	gèng-∅	waar-∅	hèd-∅	daad-∅
2. Person singular	gèng-sd	waar-sd	hèd-sd	daad-sd
3. Person singular	gèng-∅	waar-∅	hèd-e	daad-∅
1. Person plural	gèng-ng	waar-n	hèd-n	daad-n
2. Person plural	gèng-d	waar-d	hèd-ed	daad-ed
3. Person plural	gèng-ng	waar-n	hèd-n	daad-n

==== Imperative ====
The imperative is identical to first person present tense indicative. In order to obtain the plural imperative, -d is suffixed to the singular form.

example:

(22)	Bii	nur	màà	ruich!
	[piː]	[nəɰ]	[mʌː]	[ɣʊɪʂ]
	Sei	endlich		ruhig!
	Be	finally		quiet!

==== Passive ====
The passive is formed with the auxiliary wèèr- (German werden) and the past participle of the full verb.

Example:

(23)	Wii	wèrd	dèè	dàs	gemàchd
	[viː]	[vɛɰt]	[tɛː]	[tʌs]	[kəmʌχt]
	Wie	wird	denn	das	gemacht?
	How	is	now	this	made?

== A sample of Erzgebirgisch speech (Lichtenstein dialect) ==
(24)	Wuu	kimsd	dee	duu	ize	haar?
	[vuː]	[kʰɪmst]	[teː]	[tuː]	[ɪtsə]	[haːɰ]
	Where	comest	then	thou	now	from?
	Where	on	earth	are	you	coming	from	right	now?
(25)	Dàs	kàà	(i)ch	der	fei	ni	sààn.
	[tʌs]	[kʰʌː]	[(ɪ)ʂ]	[tɔɰ]	[faɪ]	[nɪ]	[sʌːn]
	That	can	I	thee	at.all	not	say
	I	cannot	tell	you	at	all.

== Sample text ==
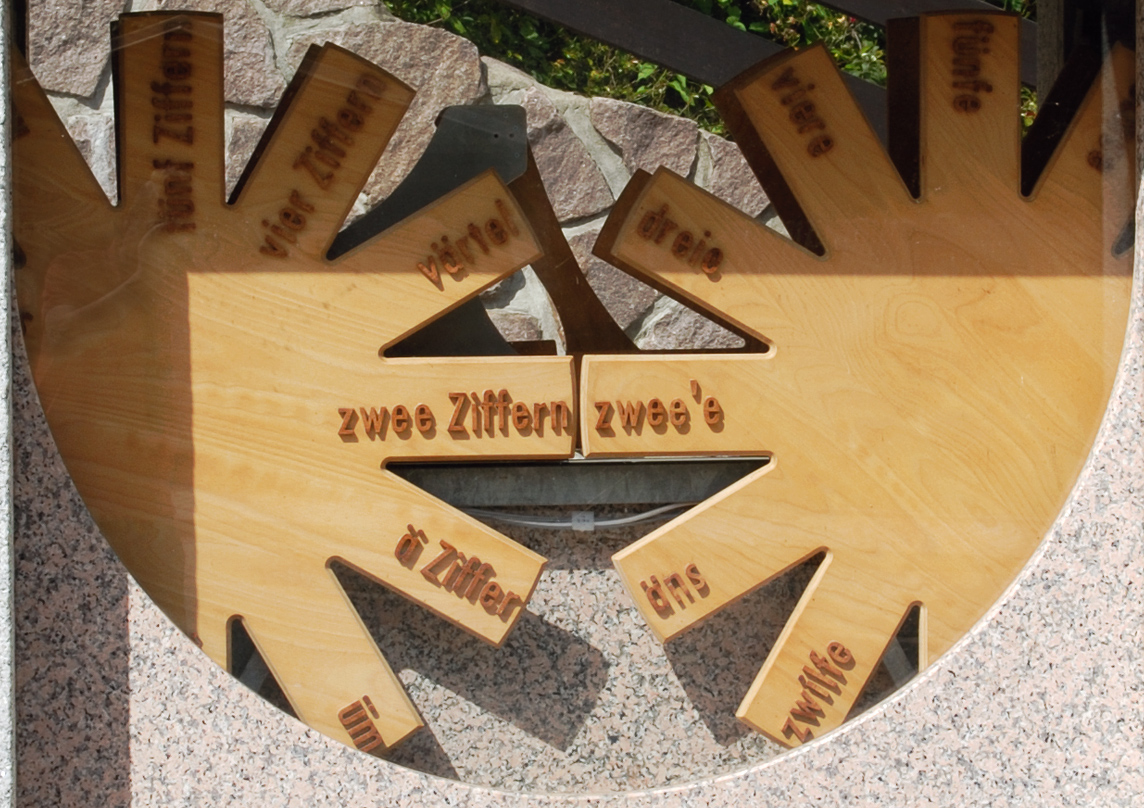
Clock showing the time of day in the Hormersdorfer dialect

The following snippet contains the introduction and the first stanza of a wedding poem from Clausthal (1759) and is written in the Oberharz dialect:

Aſs t'r Niemeyer ſeine Schuſtern in de Kerch zur Trauer kefuͤhrt prengt aͤ Vugelſteller Vugel un hot Baͤden kratelirt iſs k'ſchaͤn d. 25. Oktober 1759. Clasthol kedruͤckt bey den Buchdrucker Wendeborn.

Klick auf mit enanner, ihr ſtatlig'n Harrn!
Do ſtellt ſich d'r Toffel ahch ein aus der Farrn,
Har hot ſich ju kraͤts ſchunt de Fraͤhaͤt kenumme,
Su iſs'r ahch diesmol mit reiner kekumme.
Se hahn ne ju ſuͤſt wos zu luͤſen (Note: According to Borchers (1929), luͤſen 'to earn, get money' was pronounced [ˈliːsən] – Erzg. does not have the uͤ sound [y]. According to Radlof the standard German is lösen (which means remove, loosen, solve, buy in English depending on context). In Neues Vaterländisches Archiv it is spelled as lißen in the text, and as ließen – lösen. in the notes.) kekahn:
Ich hoh' ſchiene Vugel, wolln Sie ſe beſahn?

Translation

When Niemeyer lead his bride to the church to marry her, a bird trapper brought birds and congratulated them; This happened on October 25 in 1759. Clausthal, printed at the Wendeborn Printing House.

Hello you all, you honorable men!
Here comes the lad from far away,
He has already taken the liberty,
So he came in this time again.
They have sometimes given him something to earn:
I have nice birds, do you want to have a look on them?

== Lexicon ==
Like all dialects, Erzgebirgisch has some words which are difficult to grasp for outsiders. These include contractions of long words, but also some words unknown to other dialects or even other subdialects of the same lineage.

=== Nouns ===
Lexeme	pronunciation (NW dialect)	Standard German	English	Notes
aarb	werzg. [ˈaːɰp]	Arbeit	work	only in the western dialect
aardabl	[ˈaːɰtæpl̩]	Kartoffel	potato	literal: earth apple
ààziizeich	[ˈʌːˌtsiːtsaɪ̯ʂ]	Kleidung	clothing	literal: Anziehzeug
àbort	[ˈʌpɔɰt]	Toilette	loo (toilet)	
bèg	[ˈpɛk]	Bäcker	baker	
bèremèd	[ˌpɛɣəˈmɛt]	Weihnachtspyramide	Christmas pyramid	
bèrschd	[ˈpɛɰʂʈ]	Bürste	brush	
burschdwich	[ˈpʊɰʂʈvɪʂ]	Besen	broom	
dibl	[ˈtɪpl̩]	Tasse	cup	literal: Töpfchen
dridewààr	[ˌtxɪtəˈvʌːɰ]	Gehsteig	sidewalk	derived from French trottoir
fauns	[ˈfaʊ̯ns]	Ohrfeige	slap	
feier	[ˈfaɪ̯ɔ]	Feuer	fire	
fuuchlbaarbaam	[ˈfuːxl̩ˌpaːɰpaːm]	Eberesche	rowan	literal: bird berry tree (rowanberry tree)
gaacher	[ˈkæːχɔɰ]	Jäger	hunter	
gudsàger	[ˈkʊtsʌkɔɰ]	Friedhof	cemetery	literal: God's acre
hèm	[ˈhɛm]	Hemd	shirt	
hiidrààbradl	[ˈhiːˌtxʌːpxætl̩]	Serviertablett	tray	literal: little bring here tray
hitsch	[ˈhɪtʂ]	Fußbank	footbench	
huchtsch	[ˈhʊxtʂ]	Hochzeit	wedding	
lader	[ˈlætɔɰ]	Leiter	ladder	
nààmitsch	[ˈnʌːmɪtʂ]	Nachmittag	afternoon	
pfaar	[ˈpfaːɰ]	Pferd	horse	
reeng	[ˈɣeːŋ]	Regen	rain	
schdagng	[ˈʂʈækŋ̍]	Stecken, Stock	stick	
schduub	[ˈʂʈuːp]	Wohnzimmer, Stube	living room	
(scheier)hààder	[ˈʂaɪ̯ɔɰhʌːtɔɰ]	Wischtuch	cloth for wiping	
schmiich	[ˈʂmiːʂ]	Zollstock	yardstick	
zemitschasn	[tsəˈmɪtʂasn̩]	Mittagessen	lunch	literal: midday meal
zèrwànsd	[ˈtsɛɰvʌnst]	Akkordeon	accordion	

=== Verbs ===
Erzgebirgisch has many onomatopoetic verbs (see also I. Susanka). Due to the high precipitation in the Ore Mountains, many different verbs for different kinds of rain or drizzle exist.

Word	Pronunciation (Northwest dialect)	Standard German	English	Comments
besuudln	[pəˈsuːtl̩n]	beschmutzen	(get) dirty	
blààtschn	[ˈplʌːtʂn̩]	stark regnen (Platzregen)	heavy shower	
blèègng	[ˈplɛːkŋ̍]	laut schreien	scream	
deebern	[ˈteːpɔɰn]	toben, schimpfen	be angry	
derlaam	werzg. [tɔɰˈlaːm]	erleben	experience	not in northwest dialect
drààschn	[ˈtxʌːʂn̩]	stark regnen (Dauerregen)	continuous heavy rain	
eisàgng	[ˈaɪ̯sʌkŋ̍]	einfüllen, einpacken	take, put in	Literal: einsacken
gwèstern	[ˈkvɛstɔɰn]	immer wieder rein und raus gehen	repeatedly getting in and out	
kambln	[ˈkʰæmpl̩n]	sich prügeln	beat each other	
siifern	[ˈsiːfɔɰn]	leicht nieseln	light drizzle	

=== Other words ===
Like many other German dialects, Erzgebirgisch is rich in adverbs, like the notorious fei, whose use is extremely complex and needs further research. It appears in commands (Gii fei wag!, Go away!), but also in affirmations (S´reengd fei, It's raining, by the way.).

Lexeme	Pronunciation (Nordwestdial.)	Standard German	English	Notes
dingenauf	[ˌtɪŋəˈnaʊ̯f]	bergauf, nach oben	uphill, upward	
emènde	[əˈmɛndə]	möglicherweise	possibly	literal: at the end
feeder	[ˈfeːtɔɰ]	vorwärts, weiter	further	from English
fei	[ˈfaɪ̯]	aber, nämlich, endlich, ziemlich	but, indeed, finally, quite	
fiir	[ˈfiːɰ]	vor	for	also in expressions
gaaling	[ˈɡæːlɪŋ]	heftig	vehement	
heier	[ˈhaɪ̯ɔɰ]	dieses Jahr	this year	
hèm	[ˈhɛm]	nach Hause	at home	literal: home
hiimundriim	[ˌhiːmʊnˈtxiːm]	auf beiden Seiten	on both sides	literal: hüben und drüben
hinewiider	[ˌhɪnəˈviːtɔɰ]	hin und her	here and there	
ize	[ˈɪtsə]	jetzt	now	
nààchert	[ˈnʌːxɔɰt]	nachher	to here	
zàm	[ˈtsʌm]	zusammen	together	

=== Interjections ===
The interjections used in Erzgebirgisch differ considerably from the Standard German ones. The language area being dominated by mining, some linguistic patterns peculiar to this business have attained general usage, like the salute Glig auf! (dt. "Glück auf").

English does not have a specialized form to affirm negative questions, unlike French (si), Dutch (jawel) or German (doch). Erzgebirgisch uses Ujuu! [ˈʊjuː], or sometimes Ajuu! [ˈajuː], (dt. "Doch!") in these contexts. For the negation of a question expecting a positive answer È(schà)! [ˈɛ(ʂʌ)] (dt. "Nein!") is used. This interjection is also used to express surprise, albeit with a different intonation.

== Literature ==
=== Grammars and other linguistic publications ===
- Oswin Böttger: Der Satzbau der erzgebirgischen Mundart. Leipzig 1904. – An analysis of the syntax.
- Erich Borchers: Sprach- und Gründungsgeschichte der erzgebirgischen Kolonie im Oberharz. Marburg 1929. – Grammar of the Upper Harz variety.

=== Other literature ===
- Irmtraud Susanka: Wie mir drham geredt homm. Unsere Mundart im Bezirke Kaaden-Duppau. Verlag des Kaadener Heimatbriefs, Bayreuth (no year, no ISBN). – Collection of words, phrases, poems and short stories of the southern variety formerly spoken in the Sudetenland.
