= Low Lusatian German =

Central German variety of Brandenburg and Saxony

Low Lusatian
- Native to: Germany
- Region: Brandenburg, Saxony
- Language family: Indo-European: Germanic; West Germanic; Irminonic; High German; Central German; East Central German; Low Lusatian

Language codes
- ISO 639-3: –
- Glottolog: None

Low Lusatian German or the Low Lusatian dialect (in German: Niederlausitzer Mundart) is a variety of Central German spoken in northern Saxony and southern Brandenburg within the regions of Lower Lusatia (Cottbus) and the northern part of Upper Lusatia (Hoyerswerda). It is well-defined from the Low German dialects around and north of Berlin, as well as the Upper Saxon dialect group of present-day Saxony and the Slavic language of the Sorbs.

Both regions were strongly influenced by different dialects, especially after World War II. Refugees from East Prussia and Silesia settled there after their dispossession from former German areas. After the foundation of the German Democratic Republic and an economical development because of a stronger extraction of lignite, people from Mecklenburg, Thuringia, Saxony, and Saxony-Anhalt moved to the Lusatia region to benefit from the development. Due to this influence of other German dialects, Low Lusatian never formed a too strong variation from standard German. For people moving now into this area, the dialect is easy to learn and influences their spoken language quite quickly.

== Language ==
Low Lusatian German lacks region-specific words. It contains syncopes and apocopes, which are used in nearly every German dialect. The only somewhat different articulation is the guttural ⟨r⟩, where Standard German's ⟨er⟩ [ɐ] ending is instead ⟨a⟩ [a]:

English	Standard German		Lower Lusatian German	
English	spelling	IPA	spelling	IPA
water	Wasser	[ˈvasɐ]	Wassa	[ˈvasa]
hammer	Hammer	[ˈhamɐ]	Hamma	[ˈhama]
sister	Schwester	[ˈʃvɛstɐ]	Schwesta(r)	[ˈʃvɛsta]

At the beginning of a word, the ⟨r⟩ is always spoken, but it is nearly inaudible within a word. The same effect can be seen on the letter ⟨e⟩ [ɛ] which also mostly vanishes in the endings, the changing of ⟨au⟩ [aʊ] to ⟨o(h)⟩/⟨oo⟩ [oː], and the stretching of ⟨ei⟩/⟨ai⟩ [aɪ] to ⟨ee⟩ [eː]:

English	Standard German		Lower Lusatian German	
English	spelling	IPA	spelling	IPA
to rake	harken	[ˈhaʁkn̩]	haakn	[ˈhaːkn̩]
to work	arbeiten	[ˈaʁbaɪtn̩]	abeitn	[ˈabeːtn̩]
to buy	kaufen	[ˈkaʊfn̩]	kohfn	[ˈkoːfn̩]
as well	auch	[aʊx]	ooch	[oːx]
on	auf	[aʊf]	ohf	[oːf]
one	ein (m.) eine (f.) eines (n.)	[aɪn] [ˈaɪnə] [ˈaɪnəs]	een eene eens	[eːn] [ˈeːnə] [eːns]
small	kleine	[ˈklaɪnə]	Kleene	[ˈkleːnə]

The short ⟨i⟩ [ɪ] is spoken similarly to the Standard German ⟨ü⟩ ([y] or [ʏ]):

English	Standard German		Lower Lusatian German	
English	spelling	IPA	spelling	IPA
table	Tisch	[tɪʃ]	Tüsch	[tʏʃ]
church	Kirche	[ˈkɪʁçə]	Kürche	[ˈkʏa̯çə] (in smaller villages the word Kerke is used.)
cherry	Kirsche	[ˈkɪʁʃə]	Kürsche	[ˈkʏa̯ʃə]

Another sign is a different form of the perfect:

English	Standard German		Lower Lusatian German	
English	spelling	IPA	spelling	IPA
it was switched off	es wurde abgeschaltet	[ɛs ˈvʊʁdə ˈapɡəʃaltət]	es wurde abgeschalten	[ɛs vua̯də ˈapɡəʃaltn̩]
