= Lusatian dialects =

East Central German dialects of Germany

Lusatian
- Native to: Germany
- Region: Brandenburg, Saxony
- Language family: Indo-European: Germanic; West Germanic; High German; Central German; East Central German; Lusatian

Language codes
- ISO 639-3: –

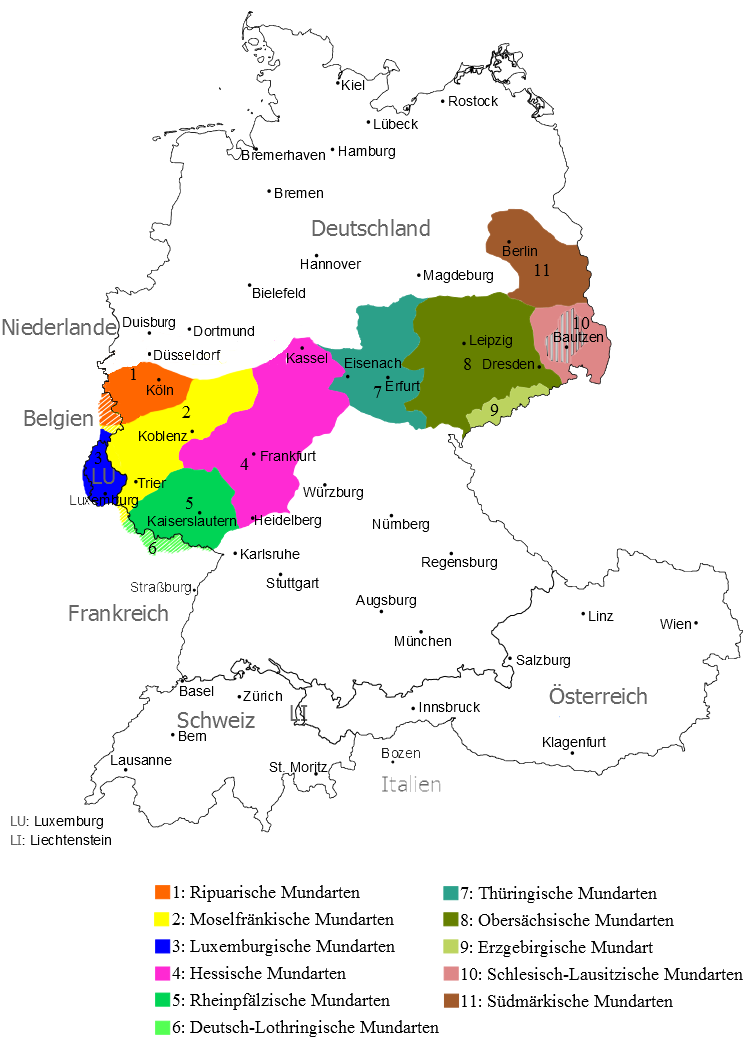
Central German dialects after 1945 10: Silesian-Lusatian

The Lusatian dialects (Standard German: Lausitzisch) are East Central German (High German) dialects spoken in southern Brandenburg and eastern Saxony. The name "Lusatian" derives from the term Lusatia, meaning the dialects of Lusatia. They are most closely related to Silesian German.

Berlin and Brandenburg originally lay in the Low German language area. Through immigration to Berlin from (then) Central German-speaking regions like Silesia and Saxony, the city's Low German dialect has been strongly influenced by Central German, so that it evolved from a Low German into a Central German (High German) variant, which then spread from Berlin to the surrounding areas of Brandenburg.

The Slavic languages of Lower and Upper Sorbian, which are spoken in Lusatia as well, are also sometimes referred to as Lusatian languages.

== Main dialect groups ==
- Eastern Lusatian (spoken in Eastern Upper Lusatia)
- Low Lusatian (spoken in Lower Lusatia and northern Upper Lusatia)
- New Lusatian (spoken in the area of settlement of the Sorbs; influenced by the Sorbian languages)
- Upper Lusatian (spoken in southern Upper Lusatia; with an American r)
- Western Lusatian (spoken in Western Upper Lusatia)
