= German Silesia =

German Silesia may refer to:

- Province of Silesia, a province of Prussia before 1919
- Province of Upper Silesia (1919–1945)
- Province of Lower Silesia (1919–1945)

== See also ==
- Silesian German, a dialect of German spoken in Silesia
