= Ponaschemu =

Mixed language of German and Lower Sorbian

Ponaschemu [lit. 'among us' or 'our way'] is a mixed language that was formed by mixing German and Lower Sorbian. Sometimes it is taken as a dialect of German.

By definition, some linguists would call Ponaschemu not a mixed language (= intertwined language) but rather a code mixing and/or code switching of the last bilingual generation in the formerly monolingual community in Lower Lusatia. At an early stage, the embedding language was Lower Sorbian and laterly Lusatian German substituted by the variety of Berlin.

It was used extensively until the 1950s, especially in Spreewald, in the villages where the Germans and the Sorbs were living together. Today, only about 500 people speak Ponaschemu.

== Examples ==
Children's rhythm of 1890, written by Wiliball von Schulenburger:

- "Morgenrot, swinja tot. Škla grochow, zwerjcha knochow. Šklicka rajsa, zwerjcha šajsa."

== Bibliography ==
- Der Niedersorben Wendisch, H. Fasske, wyd. 1. Aufl, Bautzen: Domowina-Verlag, 2003, ISBN 3-7420-1886-8
