= Old Thuringian dialect =

Central German and/or North Sea Germanic dialect

Old Thuringian
- Region: Duchy of Thuringia
- Ethnicity: Thuringii
- Era: 12th century
- Language family: Indo-European: Germanic; West Germanic; North Sea Germanic; High German/Old Low German; Central German; East Central German; Old Thuringian

Language codes
- ISO 639-3: –
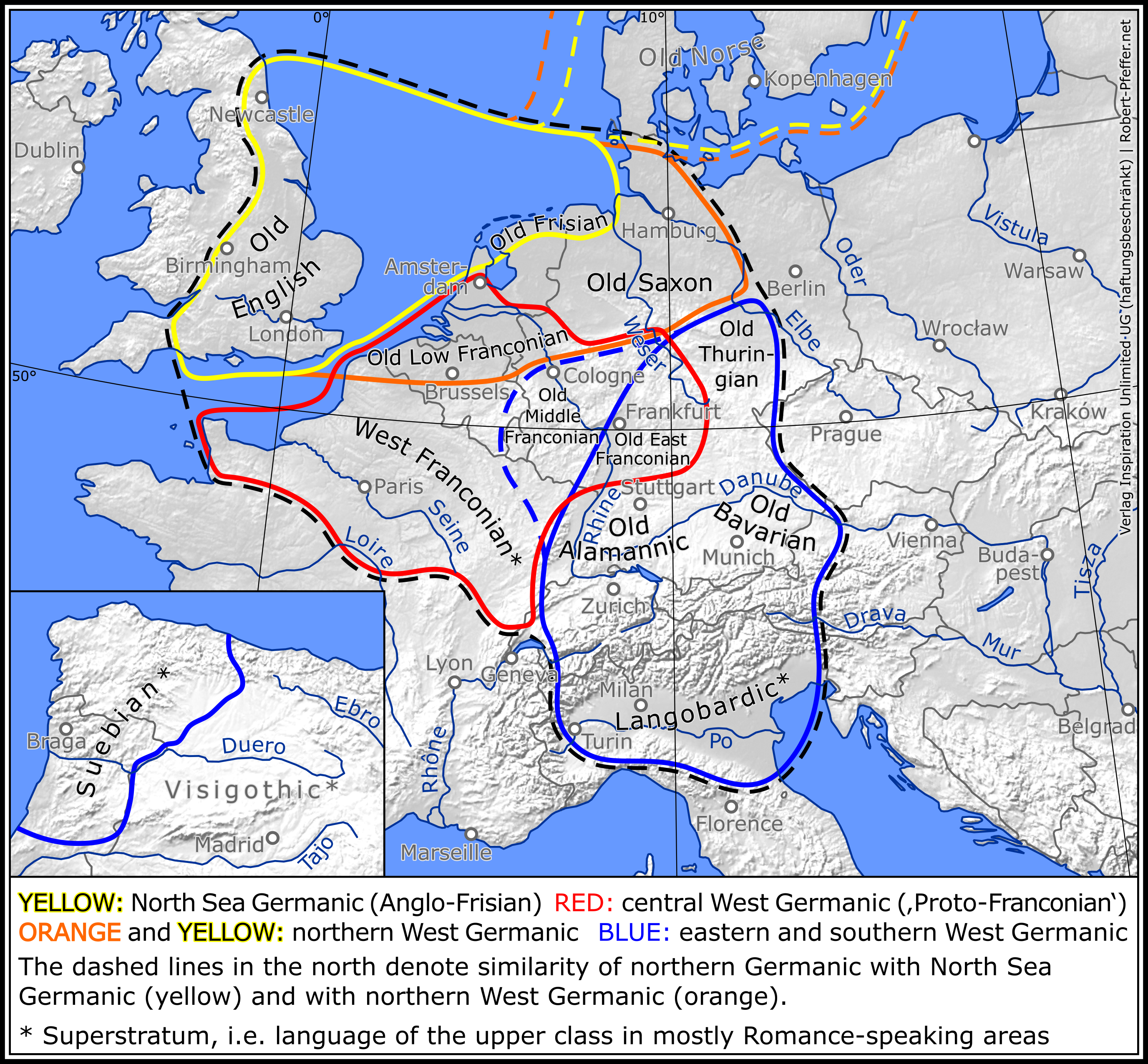

Old Thuringian is a Central German dialect of Old High German that is known through onomastic proof. It may also be included in Old Low German alongside Old Saxon and Old Frisian.

== Background ==
Thuringian emerged in the year 1100 A.D. when several groups such as Franconians, Bavarians, Saxons, and Flemish people migrants toward more eastern areas, where Polabian Slavs once occupied.

== Sample text ==
The words of text such as liubi for leubi and leob for leub may indicate a form of Old Thuringian.

Haribrig.
Hiba liubi leob.
