= Central Thuringian =

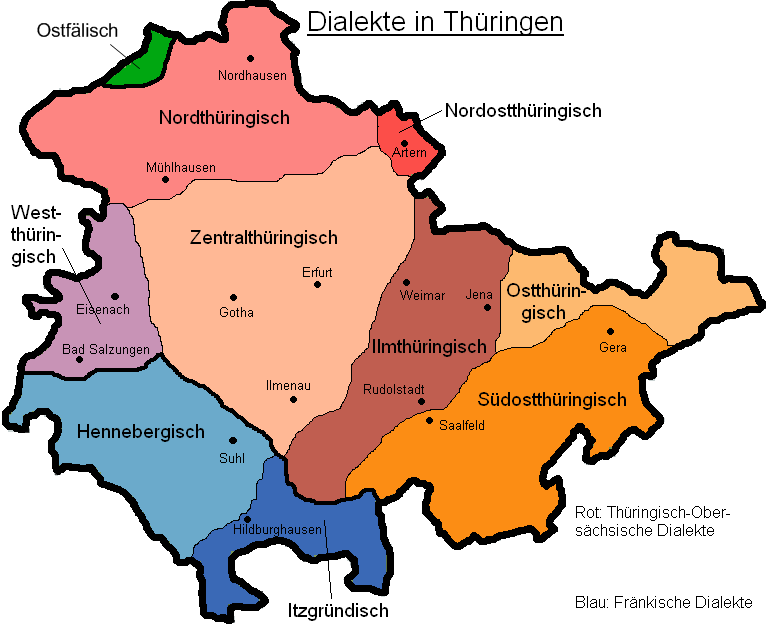
Dialects of Thuringian German: Central Thuringian in pale pink

Central Thuringian (German: Zentralthüringisch) is a Thuringian dialect, that is spoken in the region of central Germany covered by the districts of Gotha, Sömmerda and Ilm-Kreis as well as in the southern part of Unstrut-Hainich district and the city of Erfurt. A feature of the dialect are "falling diphthongs" (fallende diphthonge) (e. g. "Voater" instead of "Vater" (father)).

== Literature ==
- Wolfgang Lösch und andere: Kleines Thüringer Wörterbuch, Reclam-Verlag Leipzig, 1995. ISBN 3-379-01521-0
