= Uhlmann =

Uhlmann is a German surname that is thought to have been derived from the German given name 'Ulrich'. Alternative origins suggest it was originally a toponymic derived from the German city of Ulm, or a derivation from the High German word Owl (Uhl — in High German).

The surname is primarily found in German speaking countries. In Switzerland, Austria, and Germany — particularly from the Swabian Jura region of Baden-Württemberg, it is also found to a lesser concentration in Saxony.

Notable people with the surname include:

- Chris Uhlmann (born 1960), Australian television presenter and journalist
- Gunther Uhlmann (born 1952), Chilean mathematician
- Katie Uhlmann (born 1988), Canadian actor, producer and writer
- Marianne Uhlmann, Swiss female curler, European champion
- Wolfgang Uhlmann (1935–2020), German chess grandmaster
- Josef “Sepp” Uhlmann (1902–1968) German Olympian and entrepreneur

== See also ==
- Uhlman
