= Uhlman =

Uhlman is a surname. Notable people with the surname include:

- Diana Uhlman (1912–1999), English art gallery administrator
- Fred Uhlman (1901–1985), German-English writer
- Jay Uhlman (born 1974), baseball coach
- Wesley C. Uhlman (born 1935), American attorney

== See also ==
- Uhlmann
