= Hessian dialects =

Group of German dialects

Hessian
- Hessisch
- Native to: Germany
- Language family: Indo-European: Germanic; West Germanic; Weser-Rhine Germanic; Central German; West Central German; Rhenish Franconian; Hessian
- Early forms: Proto-Indo-European: Proto-Germanic; Frankish; Old High Franconian; Old Rhine Franconian
- Dialects: North Hessian; East Hessian; Central Hessian; South Hessian

Language codes
- ISO 639-3: –
- Glottolog: hess1238
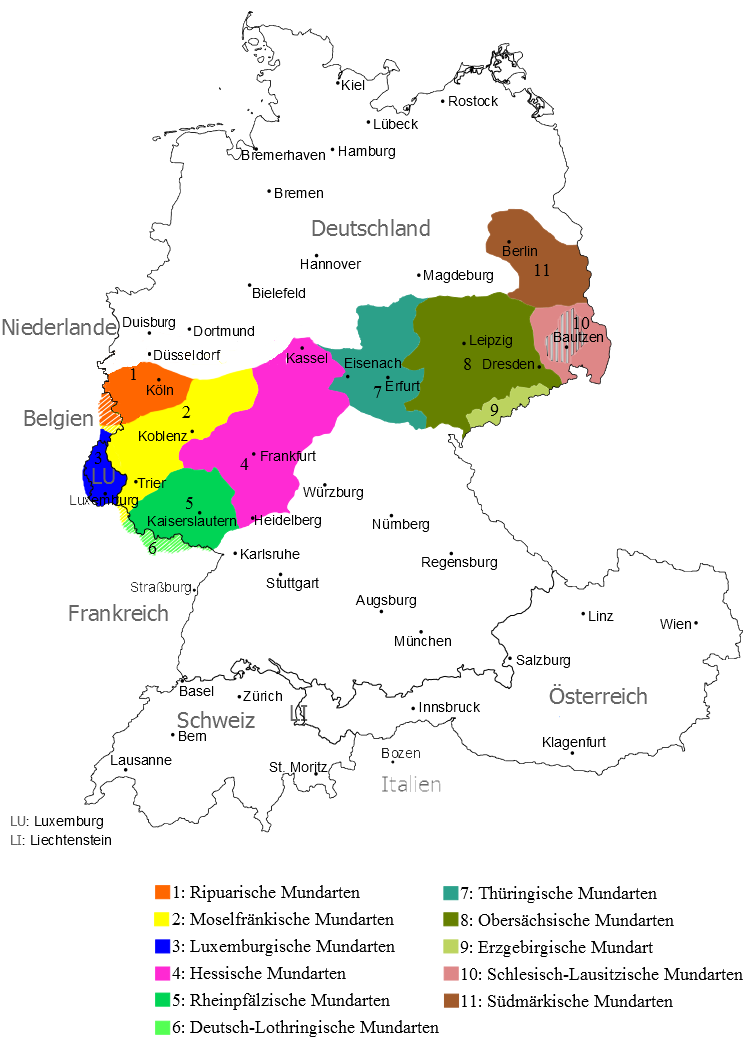
- Central German dialects after 1945 (4): Hessian

Hessian (German: Hessisch) is a West Central German group of dialects of the German language in the central German state of Hesse. The dialect most similar to Hessian is Palatinate German (German: Pfälzisch) of the Rhine Franconian sub-family. However, the Hessian dialects have some features which set them somewhat apart from other West-Central German dialects.

== Dialects ==
Hessian can be divided into four main dialects:

- North Hessian (Nordhessisch, around the city of Kassel),
- Central Hessian (Zentralhessisch, including the Marburg and Gießen areas),
- East Hessian (Osthessisch, around Fulda),
- South Hessian (Südhessisch, around Darmstadt).

To understand this division, one must consider the history of Hesse and the fact that this state is the result of an administrative reform.

The urban New Hessian Regiolect of Frankfurt and the Rhine-Main area is based on the South Hessian dialect. In the Central Hessian dialect area, this regiolect is gradually replacing the traditional local dialects. Consonants are often softened. For instance, Standard German Äpfel ('apples') becomes Ebbel.

== Classification ==
Hessian dialects are traditionally classified as part of Rhine Franconian dialect group, based on their reflexes of the High German consonant shift:

- West Germanic medial/final p, t, k shifted to f, s, ch (offen, Wasser, machen), and initial t together with medial/final tt shifted to (t)z (Zeit). Low German to the north did not participate in this shift (open, Water, maken, Tid).
- The shift t > s regularly occurred in the pronouns das and was, unlike in Central Franconian to the west, which has dat and wat.
- West Germanic initial p and medial/final pp have remained plosives (Pund 'pound', Appel 'apple'), contrasting to the east with East Franconian, which—like Standard German—has affricates in both positions (Pfund, Apfel), and with Thuringian, which has shifted initial p to f, but retained pp as a plosive (Fund, Appel).

The main distinguishing feature between Hessian (in the traditional sense) and Palatine Rhine-Franconian is the retention of medial/final st, which became scht in the latter (Hessian: fest vs. Palatine: fescht).

An alternative classification has been proposed by German dialectologist Peter Wiesinger. According to Wiesinger, North Hessian, East Hessian and Central Hessian betray closer historical links with Central Franconian and must be grouped together as Hessian (in a narrower sense) which is an independent dialect group within West Central German and thus not part of Rhine Franconian in spite of the same basic outcome of the High German consonant shift. On the other hand, South Hessian is not included in Wiesinger's Hessian, but remains included within Rhine Franconian.

== Characteristic features ==
=== North Hessian ===
Like Standard German, traditionally North Hessian has retained the Middle High German (MHG) endings -e and -en; and even further in cases where Standard German did not - like with the preposition "mirre" (with/mit). In all other Hessian dialects, -e was lost, while -en was lost in East Hessian and became -e in Central and South Hessian. In the eastern North Hessian area, the MHG long vowels î, û, iu did not undergo New High German diphthongization (Ziiden 'times', Miise 'mice', Bruud 'bride', cf. Standard German Zeiten, Mäuse, Braut).

=== Central Hessian ===
Central Hessian is characterized by a number of distinctive vowel shifts from MHG:

- The MHG diphthongs ie, uo, üe changed to [ɛɪ], [ɔʊ], [ɔɪ] (Bräib 'letter', gàud 'good', Fois 'feet', cf. Standard German Brief, gut, Füße)
- The MHG diphthongs ei, ou, öu merged to [aː] (baad 'both', Schdaab 'dust', Fraad 'joy', cf. Standard German beide, Staub, Freude).
- The MHG long vowels ê, ô, œ were raised to [iː], [uː], [iː] (Ziiwe 'toes', ruud 'red', biis 'nasty', cf. Standard German Zehen, rot, böse).

=== East Hessian ===
A characteristic feature of East Hessian are the long mid monophthongs [eː], [oː], [eː]/[øː] from the MHG diphthongs ie, uo, üe, e.g. Breef 'letter', Broder 'brother', free 'early', cf. Standard German Brief, Bruder, früh). In the northern East Hessian area, MHG high long vowels were retained like in the adjacent area of North Hessian.

=== South Hessian ===
Due to being the dialect with the most influence on the New Hessian Regiolect as it was traditionally spoken in the City of Frankfurt, it is often considered THE Hessian dialect per se. Aside from the delabialisation of front vowels, that is shared with the vast majority of the other dialects, the same merger of the old diphthongs as Central Hessian and the apocope of -e and -en, it has no striking feature setting it apart.

== See also ==
- Franconian languages
- Low German

== Bibliography ==
- Durrell, Martin; Davies, Winifred V. (1990). "Hessian". In Charles V. J. Russ (ed.). The Dialects of modern German: a linguistic survey. London: Routledge. pp. 210–240.
- Wiesinger, Peter (1983). "Die Einteilung der deutschen Dialekte". In Besch, Werner; Knoop, Ulrich; Putschke, Wolfgang; Wiegand, Herbert Ernst (eds.). Dialektologie: Ein Handbuch zur deutschen und allgemeinen Dialektforschung: Zweiter Halbband (in German). Berlin, New York: Walter de Gruyter. pp. 807–900.
