= Friedrich Gottlob Uhlemann =

Friedrich Gottlob Uhlemann (26 November 1792 in Zeitz – 19 April 1864) was a German Protestant theologian and educator best known as the author of orientalist grammatical works.

In 1815 he received his PhD from the University of Leipzig, where he was a student of Ernst Friedrich Karl Rosenmüller. Following graduation he worked for several years as a private tutor to the family of Friedrich Graf Kleist von Nollendorf. From 1822 up until his death in 1864 he was a teacher at the Friedrich Wilhelm Gymnasium in Berlin. Concurrently, he passed his habilitation for theology at the University of Berlin (1823), where in 1835 he was named an associate professor of theology. In 1839 he received an honorary doctorate in theology from the University of Leipzig.

== Selected works ==
- Elementarlehre der syrischen Sprache (1829) – Elementary teaching of the Syriac language.
- Institutiones linguae samaritanae ex antiquissimis monumentis erutae et digestae, (1837).
- Anleitung zum Uebersetzen aus dem Deutschen in das Hebräische für Gymnasien (1839) – Instructions for the translation from German into Hebrew for high schools.
- De versionum N.T. Syriacarum critico uso (1850).
- "Uhlemann's Syriac grammar : translated from the German by Enoch Hutchinson, with a course of exercises in Syriac grammar, and a chrestomathy and brief lexicon" (1855).

== See also ==
Max Uhlemann
