= Max Uhlemann =

German Egyptologist (1829–1862)

Max Uhlemann, in full Maximilian Adolph Uhlemann (1829 - 1862) was a German Egyptologist who in 1853 published the third Latin translation of the Egyptian hieroglyphic text of the Rosetta Stone inscription. He was the son of Friedrich Gottlob Uhlemann, who taught theology at the universities of Berlin and Leipzig.

Max Uhlemann's research at Leipzig, where he initially studied history and archaeology and eventually specialised in ancient Egypt and its literature, led to a doctorate in 1851. Gustav Seyffarth was among his teachers at Leipzig. In 1853, apart from his work on the Rosetta Stone, he also completed and published a Coptic grammar. From 1854 until his early death in 1862 he was a lecturer (Privatdozent) in Egyptian language and literature at the Universität Göttingen. His Drei Tage in Memphis (1856) was an early attempt to describe everyday life in ancient Egypt for a general audience; an English translation, Three Days in Memphis, appeared in 1858. This was followed by a historical novel, Der letzte der Ramessiden ("The Last of the Ramessids"), which ran to two editions in 1860 and 1863.

== Works ==
- De veterum Aegyptiorum lingua et litteris: sive de optima signa hieroglyphica explicandi via atque ratione. Leipzig, 1851 Text
- Quae, qualia, quanta? Eine Bestätigung des Quousque tandem der Champollionischen Schule. Berlin, 1852 Text
- Inscriptionis Rosettanae hieroglyphicae decretum sacerdotale. Leipzig, 1853 Text
- Linguae Copticae grammatica. Leipzig. 1853 Text
- Das Todtengericht bei den alten Ägyptern. Eine Habilitations-Rede. Berlin, 1854
- Thoth nach klassischen und aegyptischen Quellen, oder Die Wissenschaften der alten Aegypter. Göttingen 1855 Text
- Israeliten und Hyksos in Aegypten: Eine historisch-krit. Untersuchung. Leipzig, 1856 Text
- Drei Tage in Memphis, Göttingen 1856 Text
  - Three Days in Memphis. Philadelphia: Lippincott, 1858 Text
- Handbuch der gesammten ägyptischen Alterthumskunde. Leipzig, 1857-58 Text
- Grundzüge der Astronomie und Astrologie der Alten besonders der Aegypter. Leipzig, 1857 Text
- "Über die Bildung der altägyptischen Eigennamen", in Sitzungsberichte der phil.-hist. Classe der K. Akademie der Wissenschaften in Wien (1859) Text
- Der letzte der Ramessiden oder Vor drei Jahrtausenden: Ein culturhistorischer Roman. Leipzig, 1860
  - 2nd ed. Vor dreitausend Jahren oder der Untergang der Ramessiden: Ein culturhistorischer Roman. Leipzig, 1863 Text
