= Silesian German language =

Language spoken in Lower Silesia, or German dialect

Silesian
- Silesian German
- Schläsche Sproache
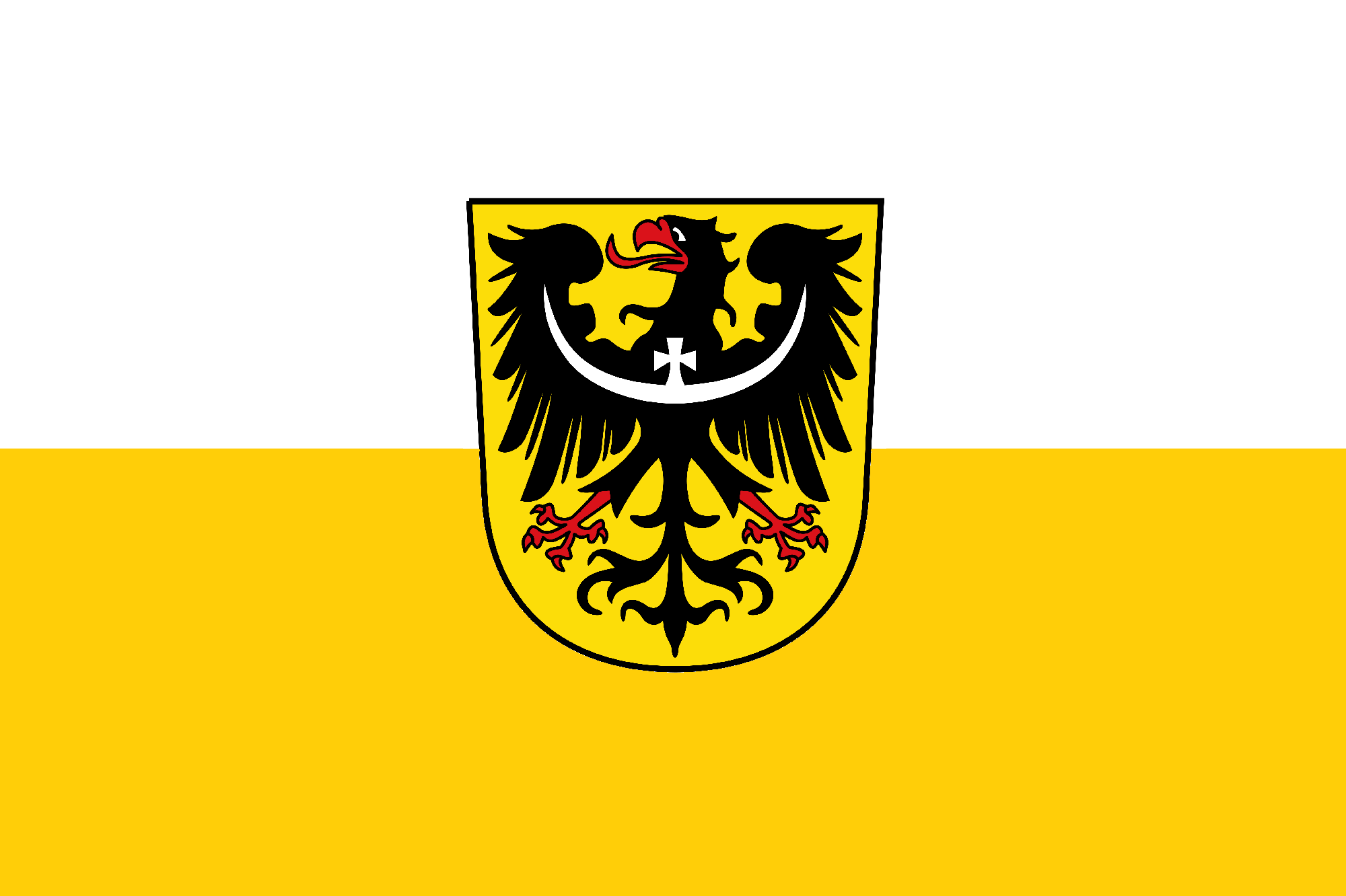
- Native to: Germany, Poland, Czech Republic
- Region: Silesia; also spoken in Czech Republic and German Silesia (area that was part of Prussian Province of Silesia, more or less around Hoyerswerda, now in Saxony)
- Ethnicity: Silesians
- Native speakers: (undated figure of 12,000 in Poland); 11,000 in the Czech Republic (2001 census)
- Language family: Indo-European: Germanic; West Germanic; Weser–Rhine Germanic; Central German; East Central German; Schlesisch–Wilmesau; Silesian
- Early forms: Proto-Indo-European: Proto-Germanic; Old Thuringian

Language codes
- ISO 639-3: sli
- Glottolog: lowe1388
- ELP: Lower Silesian

Silesian German is a nearly extinct German dialect once spoken in Silesia. It is also known as Lower Silesian to distinguish it from the West Slavic Silesian language, the regional Polish variety characteristic of Upper Silesia further east. Its name in German is Schlesisch or locally Schläsisch or Slä'sch. It is part of the East Central German language area with some Polish or Czech influences. Silesian German emerged as the result of Late Medieval German migration to Silesia, which had been inhabited by Lechitic or West Slavic peoples in the Early Middle Ages.

Until 1945, variations of the dialect were spoken by about seven million people in Silesia and neighboring regions of Bohemia and Moravia. After World War II, when the province of Silesia was incorporated into Poland, with small portions remaining in northeastern Czech Republic and in former central Germany, which henceforth became eastern Germany, the local communist authorities expelled the German-speaking population and forbade the use of the language.

Silesian German continued to be spoken only by individual families, only few of them remaining in their home region, but most of them expelled to the remaining territory of Germany. Most descendants of the Silesian Germans expelled to West and East Germany no longer learned the dialect, and the cultural gatherings were less and less frequented.

A remaining German minority in Opole Voivodeship continues use of German in Upper Silesia, but only the older generation speaks the Upper Silesian dialect of Silesian German in today's Poland.

== History ==
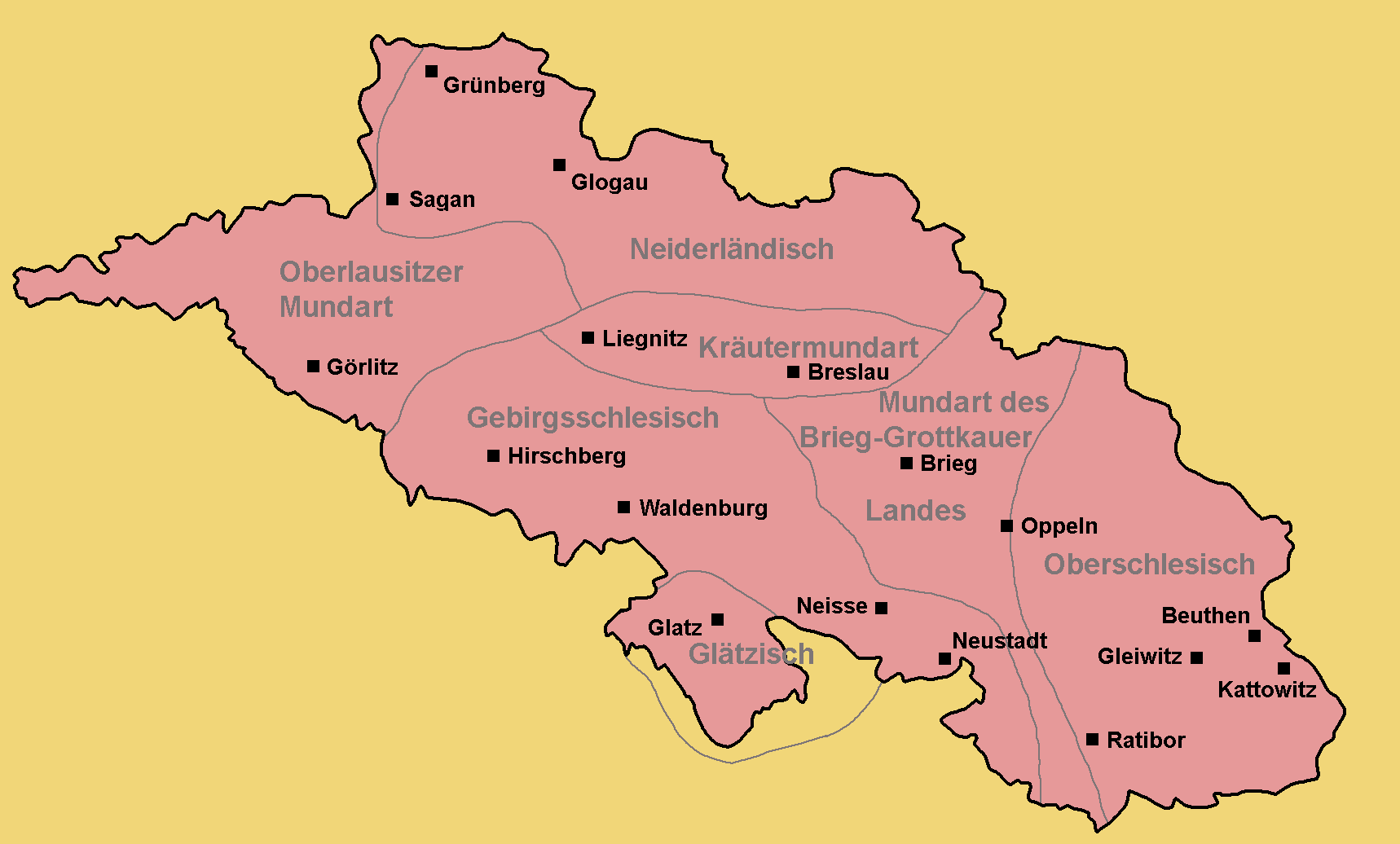
Silesian province under Prussia and, later, Germany

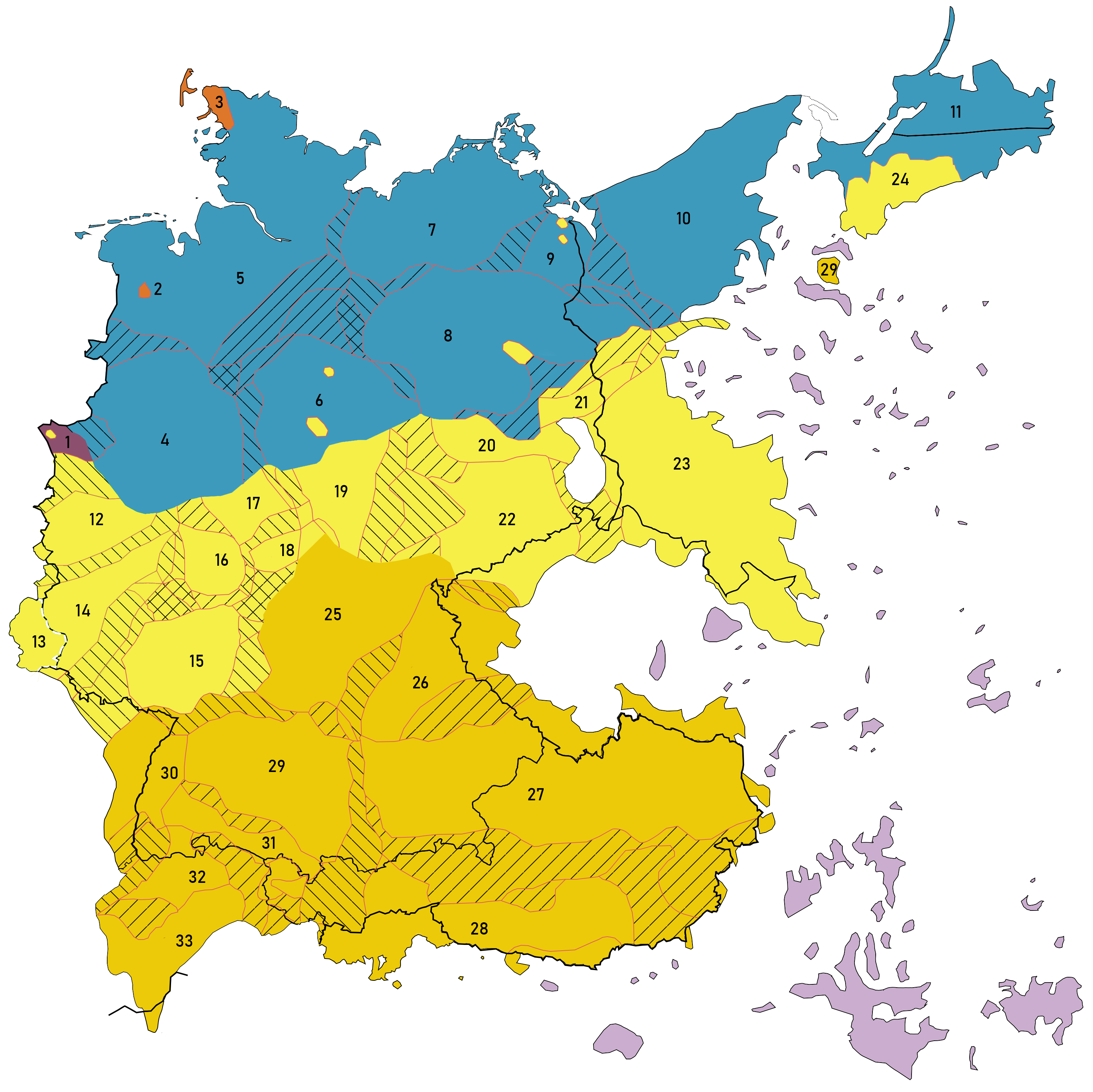
Central German language area: 23 indicates Silesian.

In origin, Silesian German appears to derive from 12th-century dialects of Middle High German, including medieval forms of Upper Saxon German, East Franconian German and Thuringian. The German-speaking inhabitants of Silesia are thought to be descendants of settlers from Upper Lusatia, Saxony, Thuringia and Franconia who first arrived in Silesia (back then part of Piast Poland) in the 13th century.

By migration over the Sudetes, the language spread to neighboring regions of Bohemia. In the 13th century, German-speaking settlers from Silesia arrived at the region around Trautenau (Trutnov), and the region around Freiwaldau (Jeseník), often founding settlements in previously uninhabited mountainous areas.

After World War II, local communist authorities forbade the use of the language. After the forcible expulsion of the Germans from Silesia, German Silesian culture and language nearly died out when most of Silesia became part of Poland in 1945. Polish authorities banned the use of the German language. There are still unresolved feelings on the sides of both Poles and Germans, largely because of Nazi Germany's war crimes on Poles and the forced expulsion and ethnic cleansing of native Germans from former German territories that were transferred to Poland in the wake of the Potsdam Agreement.

The German Silesian dialect is not recognized by the Polish State in any way, although the status of the German minority in Poland has improved much since the 1991 communist collapse and Polish entry into the European Union.

Silesian can be grouped like this:

- Ostmitteldeutsch (East Central German or East Middle German)
  - Schlesisch (Silesian)
    - Gebirgsschlesisch (Mountain Silesian)
      - Löwenbergisch
      - Schweidnitzisch
      - Glatzisch
    - Südostschlesisch (South-East Silesian)
      - Oelsisch
      - Briegisch
      - Strehlisch
    - Mittelschlesisch (Middle or Central Silesian)
    - Westschlesisch (West Silesian)
    - Neiderländisch

A rough division can be made into: Nord- oder Reichsschlesisch and Süd- oder Sudetenschlesisch (influenced by Central Bavarian).

Silesian German was the language in which the poetry of Karl von Holtei and Gerhart Hauptmann was written, during the 19th century.

== Grammar ==
=== Personal pronouns ===
	1st Person Singular		2nd Person Singular		3rd Person Singular				
	1st Person Singular		2nd Person Singular		Masculine		Feminine		Neuter
Nominative	ć͜h [NL, minimal-emphasised], ić͜h, eć͜h [Südglatz]	ić͜h, īć͜h, aić͜h [NL], ẹ̄ć͜h [NL, south-eastern], ić͜hə [most-emphasised, rarer inside of sentences and more commonly standing alone; LS]	d [before voiced sounds], də	du, dū, dūe [most-emphasised, rarer inside of sentences and more commonly standing alone]	a, ar	hā, hār, ār, ę̄r	ſə [ſ̌ə after r; sə after voiceless p, t, k, s, f, ch]	ſī [GS, LS], ſẹ̄, ſai [both NL], ſīə, ſīne [denoting female animals, prolonged forms]	s [becomes š after r], əs
Genitive	[ maint, mainst, mẹ̄nt, mẹ̄nst, menərt ]		[ daint-, denərt ]				ər, er	īr, ẹ̄r, air	s
Dative	mr̥, mer	mīr [GS, LS], mẹ̄r, mę̄r, mair [all three NL]	dr̥, der	dīr [GS, LS], dẹ̄r, dę̄r, dair [all three NL]	m̥, n̥	īm, ẹ̄m [NL, also], aim [NL, more common], īn [LS, northern], ain [NL, northern]	ər, er	īr [GS, LS], ẹ̄r, air [both NL]	m̥, n̥ [northern]
Accusative	məć͜h, mić͜h, meć͜h, mīć͜h	mić͜h, mīć͜h, maić͜h, mẹ̄ć͜h	ć͜h, dəć͜h, deć͜h, dić͜h, dīć͜h	dīć͜h, daić͜h, dẹ̄ć͜h	n̥ [NL, LS], a [GS]	īn [LS, GS], ẹ̄n [NL, also; Südglätzisch], ain [NL, more common]	= Nom.		= Nom.
	1st Person Plural		2nd Person Plural		3rd Person Plural				
Nominative	mr̥, mer [both GS, LS near to GS], br̥, ber [both LS near to NL, NL]	mīr [GS, LS near to GS], bīr [LS near to NL], bẹ̄r [NL, mostly], bair [NL, rarer (Festenberg, Trachenberg)]	r̥, er	īr [GS, LS], ẹ̄r [NL, mostly], air [NL, rarer]	ſə			ſī, ſẹ̄, ſai	
Genitive	inser, ọnſər, ọ̄inſr̥		oi-ər, aiər		ər			īr, īər, air	
Dative	s, es [both Glätzisch], [ſes], ins, ọns, ọ̄ins [both Glätzisch]	ins, ons	ć͜h [NL], ić͜h [Glätzisch], oić͜h, aić͜h	oić͜h, aić͜h [Glätzisch]	n̥, a			īn	
Accusative	= Dat.		= Dat.		= Nom.				

Notes:

- Contrasted are: unemphasised form / emphasised form
- Abbreviations: GS := Gebirgsschlesisch, LS := Lausitz-Schlesisch, NL := Niederländisch
- Symbols, transcribed into IPA: e = [ɛ], ę̄ = [ɛː], ẹ̄ = [eː], ə = [ə], i = [ɪ], ī = [iː], o = [ɔ], ọ = [o], ọ̄ = [oː], u = [ʊ], ū = [uː], ć͜h = [ç], ſ = [z], s = [s], ſ̌ = [ʒ]

== See also ==
- Alzenau dialect
- Wymysorys language
- Silesian language
