= High German languages =

West Germanic language family

High German
- Geographic distribution: German-speaking Europe, Namibia, United States, Canada, Brazil, Chile, Argentina, Paraguay, Colonia Tovar: Central and southern Germany; Austria; Italy in South Tyrol; Liechtenstein; Luxembourg; Switzerland; Belgium; Alsace and Lorraine
- Linguistic classification: Indo-European: Germanic; West Germanic; High German
- Subdivisions: Central German; Upper German

Language codes
- Glottolog: high1289

The High German languages (German: hochdeutsche Mundarten, i.e. High German dialects), or simply High German (Hochdeutsch [ˈhoːxˌdɔɪ̯t͡ʃ]) – not to be confused with Standard High German which is commonly also called "High German" – comprise the varieties of German spoken south of the Benrath and Uerdingen isoglosses, i.e., in central and southern Germany, Austria, Liechtenstein, Switzerland, Luxembourg, and eastern Belgium, as well as in neighbouring portions of France (Alsace and northern Lorraine), Italy (South Tyrol), the Czech Republic (Bohemia), and Poland (Upper Silesia). They are also spoken in diasporas in Romania, Russia, Canada, the United States, Brazil, Argentina, Mexico, Chile, and Namibia.

High German is marked by the High German consonant shift, separating it from Low German and Low Franconian (including Dutch) within the continental West Germanic dialect continuum. "Low" and "high" refer to the lowland and highland geographies typically found in the two areas.

== Classification ==
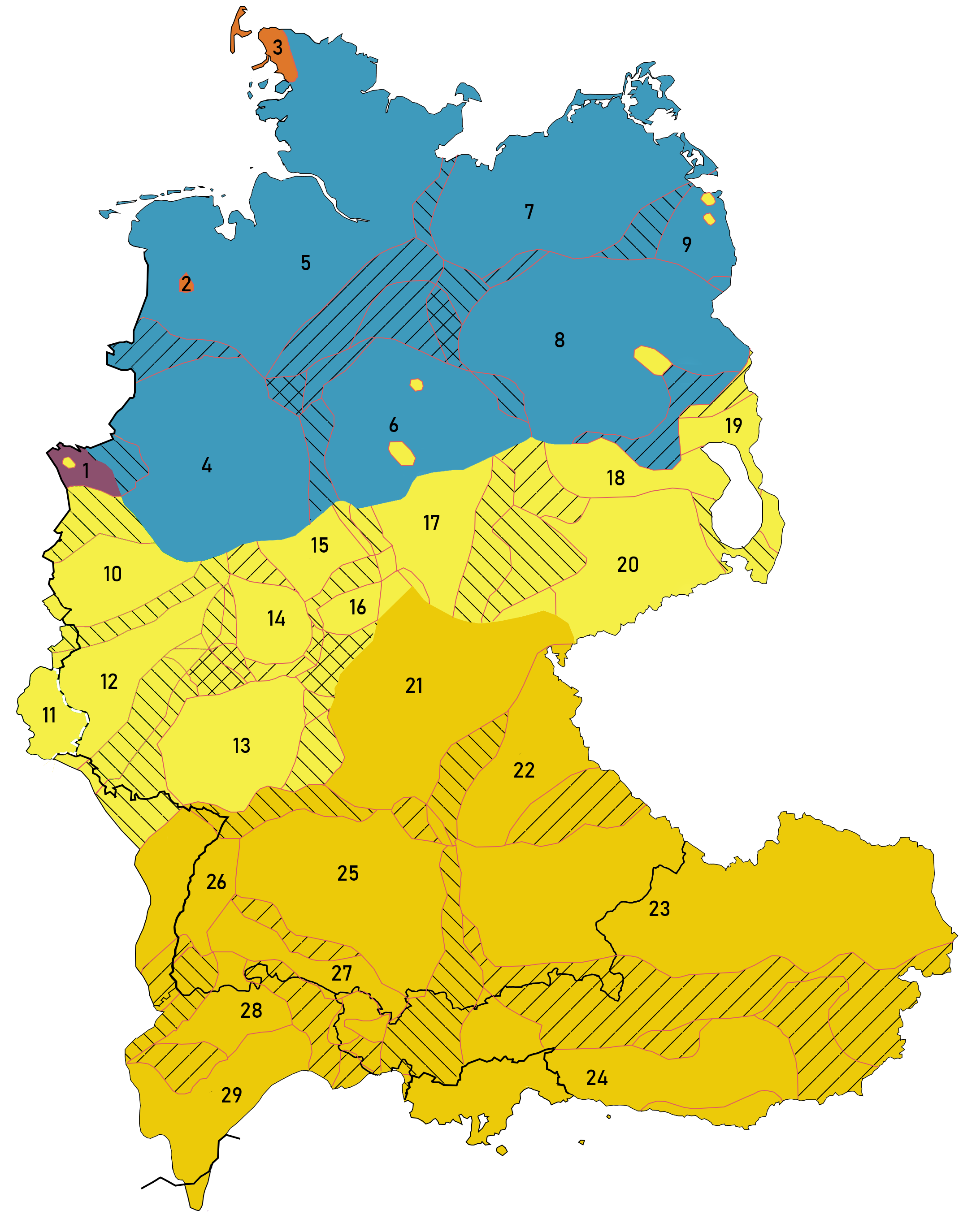
German dialect area, defined as all West Germanic varieties using Standard German as their literary language: Frisian Low Franconian Low German Central German Upper German

As a technical term, the "high" in High German is a geographical reference to the group of dialects that forms "High German" (i.e., "Highland" German), out of which developed Standard German, Yiddish and Luxembourgish. It refers to the Central Uplands (Mittelgebirge) and Alpine areas of central and southern Germany; it also includes Luxembourg, Austria, Liechtenstein, and most of Switzerland. This is opposed to Low German, which is spoken in the lowlands and along the flat sea coasts of the North German Plain.

High German can be subdivided into Upper German (Oberdeutsch) and Central or Middle German (Mitteldeutsch, this includes Luxembourgish, which itself is now a standard language).

High German varieties are distinguished from other West Germanic varieties in that they took part in the High German consonant shift (c. AD 500) to various degrees. To see this, compare the following:

English	Low German	Standard High German	Consonant shift
pan	Pann	Pfanne	[p] to [p͡f]
two	twee	zwei	[t] to [t͡s]
make	maken	machen	[k] to [x]

In the southernmost High Alemannic dialects, there is a further shift: Sack (like English/Low German "sack/Sack") is pronounced [z̥ak͡x] ([k] to [k͡x]).

== History ==
Old High German evolved from about 500 AD. Around 1200 the Swabian and East Franconian varieties of Middle High German became dominant as a court and poetry language (Minnesang) under the rule of the House of Hohenstaufen.

The term "High German" as spoken in central and southern Germany (Upper Saxony, Franconia, Swabia, Bavaria) and Austria was first documented in the 15th century.

Gradually driving back Low German variants since the Early modern period, the Early New High German varieties, especially the East Central German of the Luther Bible, formed an important basis for the development of Standard German.

== Family ==
Divisions between subfamilies within Germanic are rarely precisely defined, because most form continuous clines, with adjacent dialects being mutually intelligible and more separated ones not. In particular, there has never been an original "Proto-High German". For this and other reasons, the idea of representing the relationships between West Germanic language forms in a tree diagram at all is controversial among linguists. What follows should be used with care in the light of this caveat.

- High German
  - Central German (German: Mitteldeutsch)
    - East Central German
      - Thuringian
      - Upper Saxon, including Erzgebirgisch
      - South Marchian
      - Lusatian
      - Silesian (now mostly spoken by the German minority in Upper Silesia)
      - High Prussian (nearly extinct)
    - West Central German
      - Central Franconian
        - Ripuarian
        - Moselle Franconian dialects, including Luxembourgish
          - Hunsrik language (from the Hunsrückisch dialect)
      - Rhine Franconian
        - Palatine, including Lorraine Franconian (France)
          - Pennsylvania Dutch (in the United States and Canada)
        - Hessian
  - High Franconian, in the transitional area between Central and Upper German
    - East Franconian
    - South Franconian
  - Upper German (German: Oberdeutsch)
    - Alemannic in the broad sense or West Upper German (German: Westoberdeutsch), including Swiss German dialects
      - Swabian
      - Alemannic in the strict sense
        - Low Alemannic, including Alsatian and Basel German
        - High Alemannic
        - Highest Alemannic
    - Bavarian or East Upper German (German: Ostoberdeutsch), including Austrian German dialects
      - Northern Bavarian
      - Central Bavarian, including Viennese
      - Southern Bavarian, including Mócheno in Trentino, Italy
        - Gottscheerish
      - Cimbrian, nearly extinct
      - Hutterite German (in Canada and the United States)
    - Lombardic, extinct
  - Yiddish, evolved from Middle High German

== See also ==
- High Germany
