= Central German =

Dialect group in Central Germany

- Middle German, Mitteldeutsch
- Geographic distribution: Western and Central Germany, southeastern Netherlands, eastern Belgium, Luxembourg and northeastern France
- Linguistic classification: Indo-European: Germanic; West Germanic; Weser-Rhine Germanic; Central German
- Subdivisions: West Central German; East Central German

Language codes
- Glottolog: fran1268
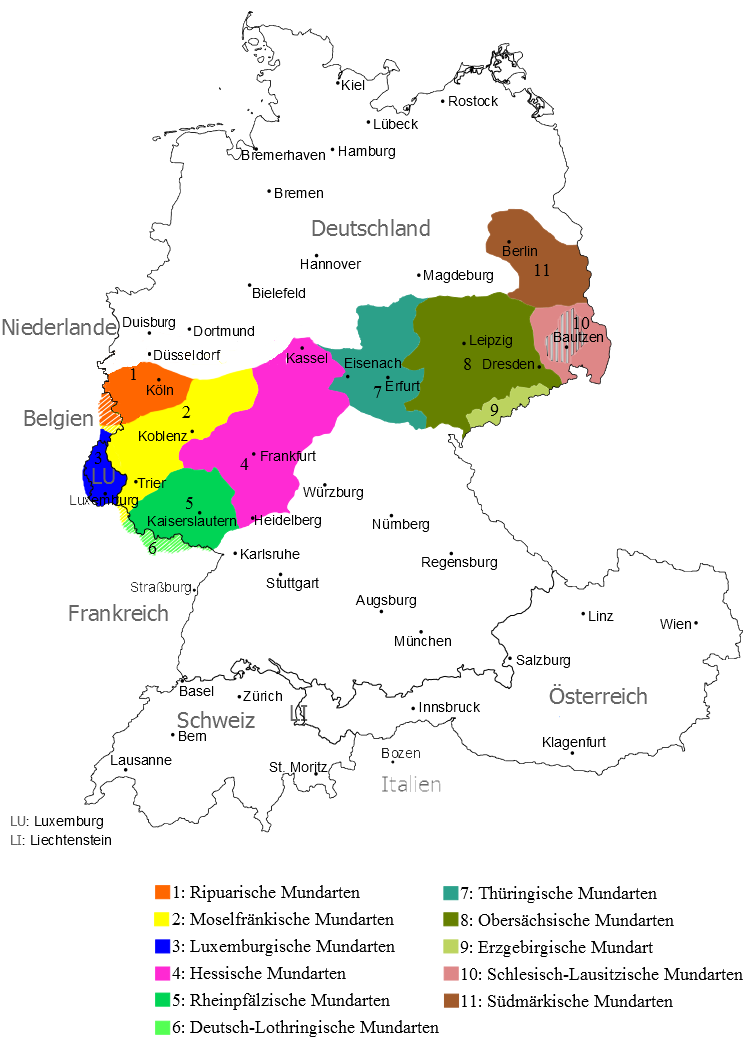
- Central German dialects after 1945 and the expulsions of the Germans West Central German: Middle Franconian -; 1: Ripuarian 2: Moselle Franconian 3: Luxembourgish: Rhine Franconian -; 4: Hessian 5: Palatinate German 6: Lorraine Franconian East Central German: 7: Thuringian 8: Upper Saxon 9: Erzgebirgisch 10: Lusatian-Silesian 11: South Marchian

Central German or Middle German (German: mitteldeutsche Dialekte, mitteldeutsche Mundarten, Mitteldeutsch) is a group of High German languages spoken from the Rhineland in the west to the former eastern territories of Germany.

Central German divides into two subgroups, West Central German and East Central German.

Central German is distinguished by having experienced the High German consonant shift to a lesser degree than Upper German. It is spoken in the linguistic transition region separated from Northern Germany (Low German/Low Franconian) by the Benrath line isogloss and separated from Southern Germany (Upper German) by the Speyer line.

Central German is spoken in large and influential German cities such as Berlin, the former West German capital Bonn, Cologne, Düsseldorf, the main German financial center Frankfurt, Leipzig, and Dresden.

The area corresponds to the geological region of the hilly Central Uplands that stretches from the North German plain to the South German Scarplands, covering the states of Saarland, Rhineland-Palatinate, Hesse, Thuringia and Saxony.

The East Central dialects are the closest to Standard German (chiefly as a written language) among other German dialects. Modern Standard German thus evolved from the vocabulary and spelling of this region, with some pronunciation features from East Franconian German.

== Classification ==
- West Central German (Westmitteldeutsch)
  - Central Franconian (Mittelfränkisch)
    - Ripuarian (Ripuarisch)
    - Moselle Franconian (Moselfränkisch)
      - Luxembourgish (Luxemburgisch)
  - Rhine Franconian (Rheinfränkisch)
    - Palatinate German (Pfälzisch)
    - Lorraine Franconian (Lothringisch), spoken in Lorraine
    - Hessian
      - North Hessian (Nordhessisch)
      - East Hessian (Osthessisch)
      - Central Hessian (Mittelhessisch)
      - South Hessian (Südhessisch)
- East Central German (Ostmitteldeutsch)
  - Thuringian (Thüringisch)
  - Upper Saxon (Obersächsisch)
  - Erzgebirgisch
  - Nordobersächsisch-Südmärkisch
  - Lusatian
  - East Central German dialects spoken in the former eastern territories:
    - Silesian (Schlesisch), nearly extinct
    - High Prussian (Hochpreußisch), nearly extinct

== See also ==
- High German
  - Upper German
- Low German
