= Thuringian dialect =

East Central German dialect group

Thuringian
- Thüringisch
- Native to: Germany
- Region: Thuringia
- Language family: Indo-European: Germanic; West Germanic; High German; Central German; East Central German; Thuringian
- Early forms: Proto-Indo-European: Proto-Germanic; Old Thuringian

Language codes
- ISO 639-3: –
- Glottolog: thur1252
- Glottopedia: Thüringisch
- IETF: gmw-u-sd-deth
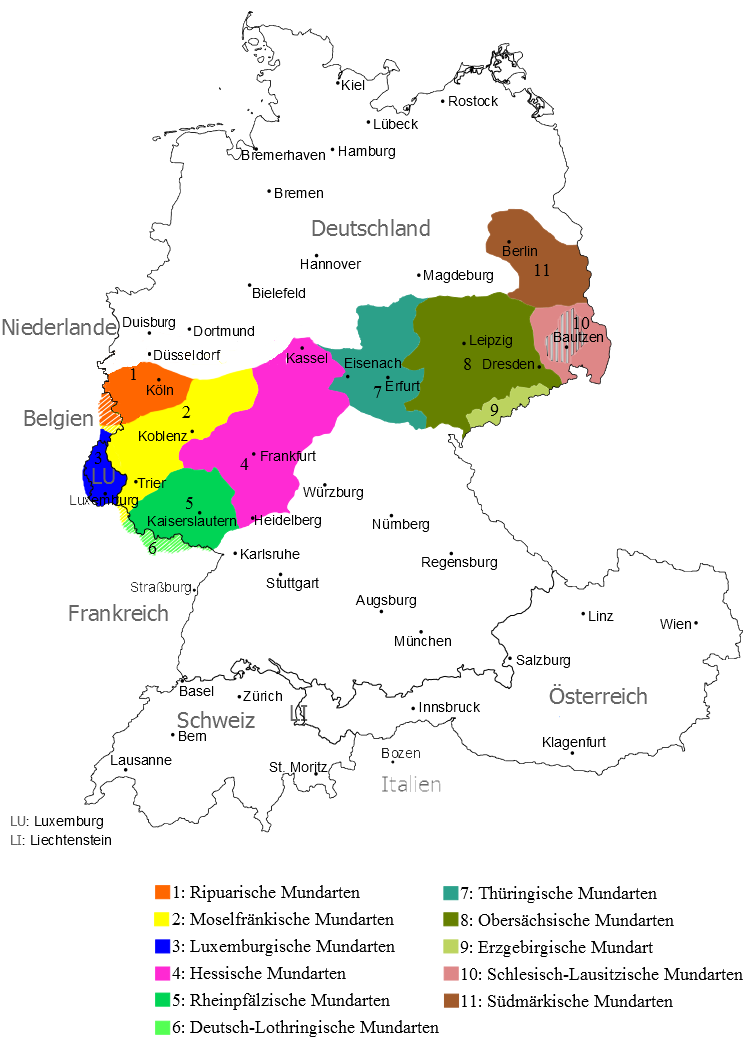
- Central German dialects after 1945 and the expulsions of the Germans Thuringian (7)

Thuringian is an East Central German dialect group spoken in much of the modern German Free State of Thuringia north of the Rennsteig ridge, southwestern Saxony-Anhalt and adjacent territories of Hesse and Bavaria. It is close to Upper Saxon spoken mainly in the state of Saxony, therefore both are also regarded as one Thuringian-Upper Saxon dialect group. Thuringian dialects are among the Central German dialects with the highest number of speakers.

== History ==
Thuringian emerged during the medieval German Ostsiedlung migration from about 1100, when settlers from Franconia (Main Franconia), Bavaria, Saxony, and Flanders settled in the areas east of the Saale River previously inhabited by Polabian Slavs.

== Characteristics ==
The Thuringian dialect is characterized by:

- a rounding of the vowels,
- the weakening of consonants of Standard German (the lenition of the consonants "p," "t," and "k"),
- a marked difference in the pronunciation of the "g" sound (which is most common in the areas of North Thuringia and Saxony-Anhalt areas),
- and a highly-idiosyncratic, melodic intonation of sentences.

The second German consonant shift manifested itself in a manner different from that elsewhere in the areas that spoke High German. In many words, "b" is pronounced as "w" or "f" would be in Standard German. For example, the word aber (but) is pronounced as "aḅer". The Thuringian dialect has advanced beyond the stage of basilect.

Furthermore, its linguistic border to the north coincides with the Uerdingen line, to the west it coincides with the Germerscheim line. Its southern border to East Franconian is demarcated by a number of morphological criteria:

- the shape of the diminutive suffix (-chen vs. -lein)
- the shape of the infinitival suffix (-en vs. -e),
- and the retention of stem forming /n/ (Mann vs. Mo ‘man’).

Its eastern border to Upper Saxon is demarcated by the shape of infinitival suffix (-en vs. -e). Furthermore, Thuringian also requires a specific element to appear, namely enn, comparable to the South Hessian and Bavarian question particle ‘n, but in contrast to these dialects, enn in Thuringian is not restricted to wh-questions. enn necessarily appears in all questions.

== Classification ==
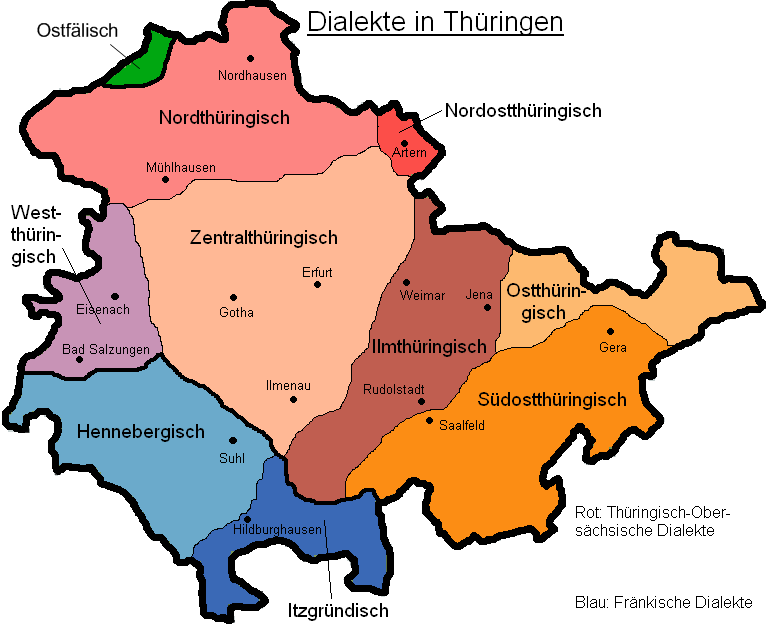
Dialects in Thuringia (including parts of Eastphalian and East Franconian)

Grouping according to German dialectology:

- Ostmitteldeutsch (East Middle German, East Central German)
  - Thüringisch (Thuringian)
    - Zentralthüringisch (Central Thuringian)
      - Westthüringisch (West Thuringian)
      - Ostthüringisch (East Thuringian)
    - Nordthüringisch (North Thuringian)
      - Honsteinisch
      - Sonderhäusisch
      - Eichsfeldisch
      - Südmansfeldisch

Another way to subdivide it is:

- Thüringisch / Thuringian
  - Nordthüringisch / North Thuringian: around Mühlhausen and Nordhausen
    - Eichsfeldisch: in Eichsfeld
  - Nordostthüringisch / North-east Thuringian: spoken around Artern as well as in the adjacent areas of Querfurt, Halle and Merseburg of Saxony-Anhalt
    - Mansfeldisch: in Mansfeld
  - Westthüringisch / West Thuringian: around Bad Salzungen and Eisenach, with transitions into the East Franconian (Henneberg) and (East) Hessian dialect area
  - Zentralthüringisch / Central Thuringian: spoken around the Turingian capital Erfurt, Gotha, and Ilmenau
  - Ilmthüringisch / Ilm Thuringian: around Rudolstadt, Jena, and Weimar
  - Ostthüringisch / East Thuringian: spoken around Eisenberg and Altenburg as well as in the adjacent area of Naumburg, Weissenfels and Zeitz in Saxony-Anhalt
  - Südostthüringisch / South-east Thuringian: around Schleiz, Greiz, Saalfeld and Gera, as well as around Ludwigsstadt in neighbouring Bavaria
