= Upper Saxon German =

East Central Deutsch dialect

Upper Saxon
- Obersächsisch
- Pronunciation: [ɵːb̥oˤˈsɛɡ̊sʃ]
- Native to: Germany
- Region: Saxony
- Native speakers: (2 million cited 1998)
- Language family: Indo-European: Germanic; West Germanic; Elbe Germanic; High German; Central German; East Central German; Upper Saxon

Language codes
- ISO 639-3: sxu
- Glottolog: uppe1465
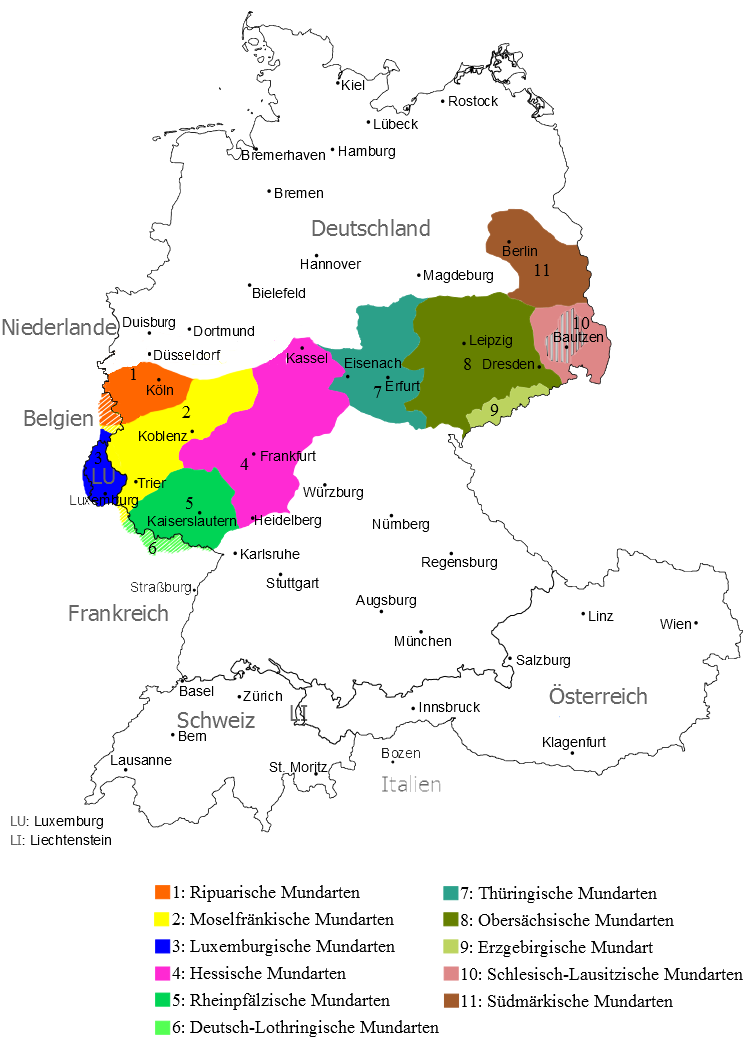
- Central German dialects after 1945 and the expulsions of the Germans Upper Saxon (8)

Upper Saxon (German: Obersächsisch, standard pronunciation: [ˈoːbɐˌzɛksɪʃ], Upper Saxon pronunciation: [ɵːb̥oˤˈsɛɡ̊sʃ]) is an East Central German dialect spoken in much of the modern German state of Saxony and in adjacent parts of southeastern Saxony-Anhalt and eastern Thuringia. As of the early 21st century, it is mostly extinct and a new regiolect (also known as obersächsische Umgangssprache) has emerged instead. Though colloquially called "Saxon" (Sächsisch), it is not to be confused with the Low Saxon dialect group in Northern Germany. Upper Saxon is closely linked to the Thuringian dialect spoken in the adjacent areas to the west.

Standard German has been heavily based on Upper Saxon, especially in its lexicon and grammar. This is due to it being used as the basis for early developments in the standardization of German during the early 1500s, including the translation of the Bible by Martin Luther.

== History ==
Upper Saxon evolved as a new variety in the course of the medieval German Ostsiedlung (eastern colonisation) from about 1100 onwards. Settlers descending from the stem duchies of Saxony, Franconia, and Bavaria, as well as Thuringia and Flanders, moved into the Margravate of Meissen between the Elbe and Saale rivers, formerly populated by Polabian Slavs. As the colonists belonged to different German tribes speaking different dialects, Upper Saxon became an intermediary, koiné dialect (Kolonialdialekt or Ausgleichsdialekt), having less distinct features than the older, more original dialects.

In the Middle Ages, a variety of Upper Saxon called Meißner Kanzleisächsisch developed as the "chancery language" of Saxony. This was the official, literary language of the Margravate of Meissen (respectively the Electorate of Saxony after 1423), replacing Latin as the language of administrators during the period of Renaissance humanism (15th to 16th century). It was less influenced by Upper German features than the Habsburg chancery language, and thus intelligible to speakers of both Upper and Low German dialects. In the context of the Bible translation by Martin Luther, it played a large part in the development of the Early New High German language as a standard variety.

Due to the influence and prestige of the Electorate of Saxony during the Baroque era (17th to 18th century), and especially its role as a focal point of artists and scientists, the language of the Upper Saxon elite (but not of its ordinary people) was considered the exemplary variant of German during that period. The literary theorist Johann Christoph Gottsched (1700–1766), who spent most of his adult life in Leipzig, considered Saxony's upper-class speech as the guiding form of standard German. When Johann Christoph Adelung published his High German dictionary (Grammatisch-kritisches Wörterbuch der hochdeutschen Mundart), he made clear that "High German" to him meant the parlance of educated Upper Saxons. He claimed that the Upper Saxon variety was to the German language what Attic was to Greek and Tuscan to Italian. One motive of the parents of German national poet Johann Wolfgang Goethe (a native of Frankfurt) to send him to study in Leipzig was to adopt a more sophisticated language.

With Saxony's loss of political power after the Seven Years' War (1756–63), its dialect lost prestige as well. In 1783, philosopher Johann Erich Biester, residing in the Prussian capital of Berlin, rated the "unpleasant singsong" and "highly peculiar confusion of b and p, of d and t"—even among upper-class speakers—"very crude".

According to linguist Beat Siebenhaar, Upper Saxon — defined as a cohesive linguistic system with its own, clear rules for pronunciation, word formation and syntax — became largely extinct during the second half of the 19th to early 20th century. This was due to the increased adoption of the standard language among the Saxony populace. Since then, (Upper) Saxon merely refers to a colloquial, regional variety of Standard German and not a dialect in the proper sense.

Spoken by leading communists from the Central German industrial area such as Walter Ulbricht, the Upper Saxon dialect was commonly perceived as the colloquial speech of East Germany by West German citizens and up to today is a subject of numerous stereotypical jokes. The mildly derogatory verb sächseln means to speak with a Saxon accent.

== Features ==
Like many other German languages, Upper Saxon features the unrounding of vowel sounds descended from Middle High German (/ø/, /øː/, /y/, /yː/, and /yə̯/ to /e/, /eː/, /i/, and /iː/). This results in words such as bese for Standard German böse (wicked) and Biehne for Standard German Bühne (stage). In common with other East Central German varieties is the weakening of consonants, resulting in words such as Kardoffeln for Standard German Kartoffeln (potatoes) and Babba for Standard German Papa (dad). Additionally, /ë/ is reduced to /a/, resulting in Standard German Schwester (sister) becoming Schwaster in Upper Saxon.

The most notable distinguishing feature of the dialect is that the letters o and u are pronounced as centralized vowels ([ɞ] and [ɵ], respectively, when short; [ɵː] and [ʉː], respectively, when long). Speakers of other German dialects that do not have these sounds tend to perceive these sounds as being ö [øː] and ü [yː] respectively. For example, they hear [ˈɵːma] 'grandma' as if written Öma (Standard Oma [ˈoːma]). Front rounded vowels are pronounced as non-rounded (ö = [eː], ü = [iː]). Final -er is pronounced [oˤ] (or similarly, depending on the subdialect), which speakers of other German dialects tend to hear as [oː]; e.g. [ˈheːo̯ˤ] 'higher' (Standard [ˈhøːɐ̯] höher) is misheard as if written hä(h)er.

The Upper Saxon varieties outside the Ore Mountains can be easily recognized by the supposed "softening" (lenition) of the voiceless stop consonants /p/, /t/, and /k/. Speakers of other dialects hear these as if they were [b], [d] and [g] respectively. In reality, these are merely non-aspirated versions of the same /p/, /t/ and /k/, a widespread feature among Central German dialects, as opposed to strongly aspirated [pʰ], [tʰ], and [kʰ] in dominant German dialects.

In contrast to neighboring Thuringian, Upper Saxon infinitives end in -en as in Standard German rather than -e.

== Subgroups ==
The accent varies from place to place depending on the grade of the High German consonant shift:

- Meißen dialect, which remained in the former margraviate after the development of the New High German standard variety, spoken from Meißen District and Central Saxony up the Elbe River to Saxon Switzerland including the Dresden metrolect.
- North Upper Saxon dialect with stronger Low German features, spoken in Northern Saxony in and around the city of Leipzig, from Torgau and Eilenburg down to Borna, and in the adjacent territory of Saxony-Anhalt up to the Saale River at Weißenfels in the west.
- Erzgebirgisch, a distinct dialect, is spoken in the villages of the Central Ore Mountains. Until the post-war expulsions it also included the "Northwestern Bohemian" language in the adjacent Sudetenland territories to the south, today part of the Czech Republic. It is also found in Lower Saxony in the Upper Harz, to where miners from the Ore Mountains moved in the 16th century (see Mining in the Upper Harz).

== See also ==
- Sorbian languages
