= East Central German =

Variety of Central German

- East Middle German (German: Ostmitteldeutsch)
- Geographic distribution: Thuringia, Saxony, Berlin, Brandenburg, Silesia
- Linguistic classification: Indo-European: Germanic; West Germanic; High German; Central German; East Central German
- Subdivisions: Thuringian; Upper Saxon; Erzgebirgisch; Lusatian; Silesian; High Prussian; Wymysorys; Alzenau

Language codes
- Glottolog: east2832 East Middle German uppe1400 Central East Middle German
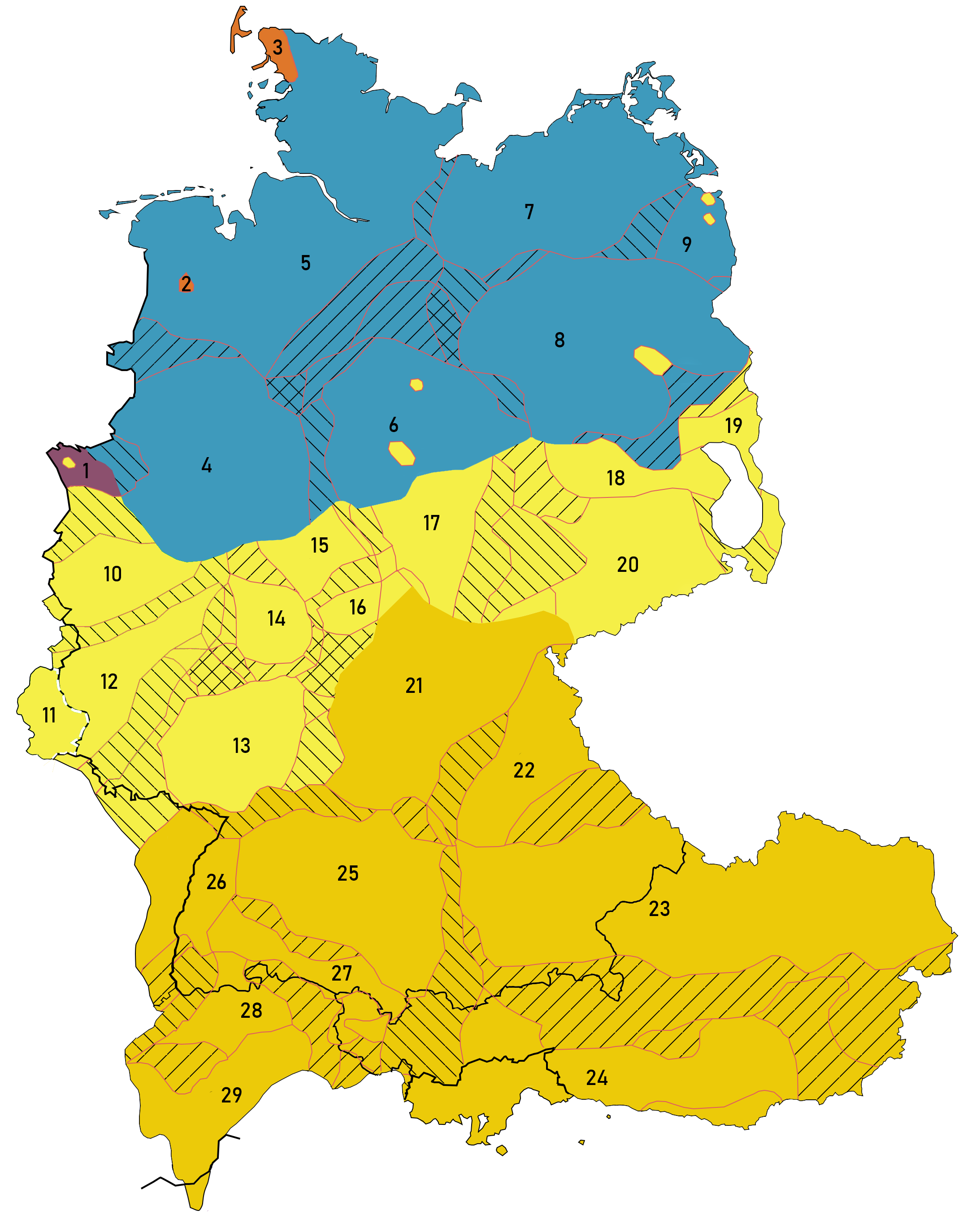
- German dialects after 1945 and the expulsions of the Germans from their eastern homelands Thuringian (17) North Upper Saxon (18) South Märkisch (19) Upper Saxon (20)

East Central German or East Middle German (German: Ostmitteldeutsch) is the eastern Central German language and is part of High German. Present-day Standard German, as a High German variant, has actually developed from a compromise of East Central (especially Upper Saxon, which was promoted by Johann Christoph Gottsched) and East Franconian German. East Central German dialects are mainly spoken in Central Germany and parts of Brandenburg, and they were formerly also spoken in Silesia and Bohemia.

== Dialects ==
East Central German is spoken in large parts of what is today known as the cultural area of Central Germany (Mitteldeutschland).

It comprises according to Glottolog:

- Central East Middle German
  - High Prussian (Hochpreußisch) (nearly extinct)
  - Thuringian (Thüringisch)
  - Upper Saxon (Obersächsisch)
    - Anhaltisch
    - Meißnisch
    - Osterländisch
    - Westlausitzisch
    - Erzgebirgisch
  - Nordobersäschisch-Südmärkisch
- Schlesisch–Wilmesau
  - Silesian (Schlesisch) (nearly extinct)
    - Old Zipser (Altzipserisch)
  - Wymysorys
  - Eastern Yiddish (which is a form of Yiddish besides Western Yiddish)

=== Nordobersächsisch-Südmärkisch ===
The dialect area of Nordobersächsisch-Südmärkisch lies north of Upper-Saxon and north-western of Silesian, in the south it includes parts of Lusatia and in the north, depending on definition, it can include the region around Berlin. It consists of multiple sub-parts, where the switch to High German (from Low German or Sorbian) occurred at different times and under different conditions, including:

- Eastern Low German
  - Märkisch
    - Südmärkisch (lit. South Markish; a form of Low German to which Südmärkisch belonged in the Middle Ages)
- East Middle German
  - Central East Middle German
    - Nordobersächsisch-Südmärkisch (lit. North Upper Saxon–South Markish)
    - Upper Saxon
      - North Upper Saxon
      - South Upper Saxon

== See also ==
- West Central German
