= Rhinelandic =

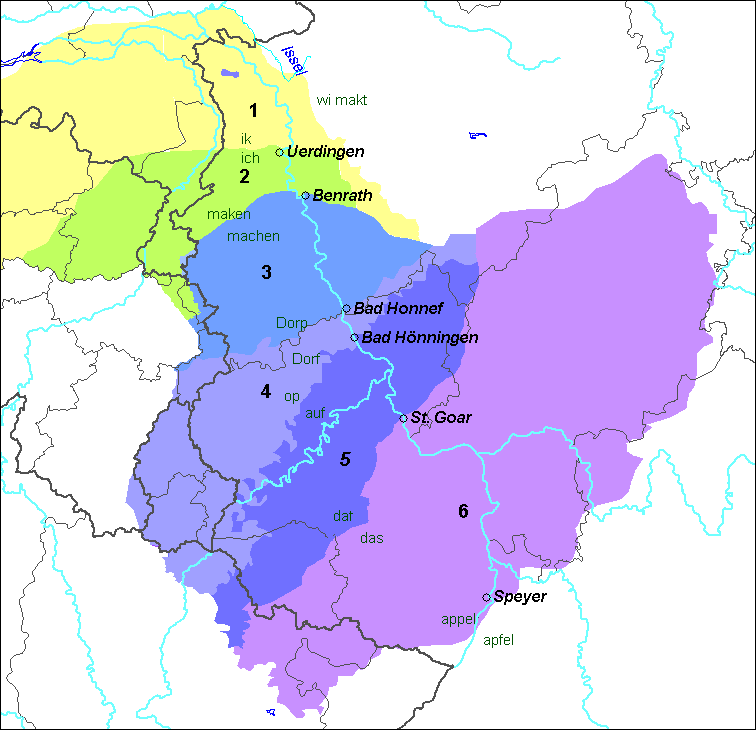
Rhinelandic dialect continuum: Low Franconian (1) incl. Brabantian, Kleverlandish (2) incl. Limburgish West Central German (Central and Rhine Franconian) (3) Ripuarian (4),(5) Moselle Franconian (incl. Luxembourgish) (6) Rhine Franconian

Rhinelandic is a term occasionally used for linguistic varieties of a region on both sides of the Middle and Lower Rhine river in Central West Germany, Belgium, the Netherlands, and Luxembourg, including some varieties of the Limburgish language group, Kleverlandish, Moselle Franconian and Ripuarian. The Local languages of villages or cities are commonly referred to as "the dialects" or "dialect". One of the meanings of Rhinelandic is that of a group of local languages in an area called the Rhineland. Another meaning is that of the regiolect being used by the people approximately of the same area.

== Rhinelandic Local Languages ==
Alternatively, if Rhineland is seen as the territory of the former Prussian Rhine Province (1815/1816–1945), there are 5 dialect areas:

- Kleverländisch
- South Low Franconian
- Ripuarian
- Moselle Franconian
- a small area with a part of Rhine Franconian

One can't speak of a Rhenish dialect area. Its northern areas are also covered by the more modern term of Meuse-Rhenish, which exclusively refers to the Low Franconian varieties mentioned above.

The eastern areas in the North are also said to speak Bergish, a term which has its roots in political history and regional pride rather than linguistic similarities. Likewise, the Eifel inhabitants say, they were speaking Eifelplatt, while linguists rather refer to the Ripuarian varieties of the North, and the Moselle-Franconian ones of the South of the Eifel.

All these local languages and local language groups existed long before Standard German, and developed in parallel since the latter came into existence.

== Rhinelandic Regiolect ==
Also the Regiolect of the Rhineland, geographically roughly coinciding with the former Prussian Rhine Province, is being called Rhinelandic. It is of comparatively recent origin, and derives from Standard German but takes up some lexical and grammatical and phonetic features of the local languages, that Standard German normally does not have. Most of those features are not used in other German regiolects, and are often hardly or not understood in other regiolect areas. Rhenish (Rheinisch) is a regiolect.

== See also ==
- Rhinelandic Rhyming Bible
- Rhenish fan
