= South Low Franconian =

Low Franconian dialect group

- East Low Franconian
- Native to: Belgium, Germany, Netherlands
- Language family: Indo-European: Germanic; West Germanic; Weser–Rhine Germanic; Low Franconian; South Low Franconian

Language codes
- ISO 639-3: –
- Glottolog: limb1263
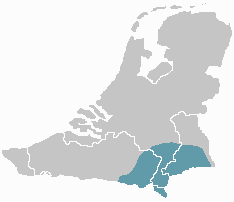
- South Low Franconian dialect area (the northern extent in this map follows the Uerdingen line).

South Low Franconian is a group of transitional dialects between Low Franconian and Ripuarian, part of the so-called Rhenish fan, a much larger transitional area between Low Franconian and Rhine Franconian. Linguists hold different opinions about the classification of South Low Franconian: the consensus view among Dutch and Belgian linguists is that South Low Franconian is a part of Low Franconian, whereas German linguists either agree with its inclusion within Low Franconian or instead position South Low Franconian within Central Franconian, either as part of its Ripuarian branch or as a sister group of it.

In the Netherlands, dialects included in this group (commonly referred to as "Limburgish") have gained recognition as a regional language in the province of Limburg.

== Terminology ==
Usage of the name "South Low Franconian" (German: Südniederfränkisch, Dutch: Zuidnederfrankisch) for this dialect group was originally restricted to German dialectology, while Dutch dialectologists generally employ the terms Limburgish (or Limburgian, Limburgs) or "East Low Franconian" (Oostnederfrankisch). (Note: The Belgian scholar Jan Goossens suggested to extend the scope of "Limburgish" to all South Low Franconian varieties including those spoken in Germany, although this usage has not been adopted by German dialectologists.) The latter is especially used for earlier forms of this dialect group, as documented in the language of the Wachtendonck Psalms, which is generally held to be a predecessor of the modern South Low Franconian varieties of both Limburg provinces. For the last decades, "South Low Franconian" has also been used by Dutch scholars in reference to the entire dialect area (including Germany).

== Distribution ==
In the Low Countries, South Low Franconian varieties are predominantly spoken in Belgian Limburg and Dutch Limburg provinces. However, not all regional dialects of Limburg belong to the South Low Franconian group (especially in the northern part of Dutch Limburg north of Horst where Kleverlandish dialects are spoken, and also in Meijel with its local dialect that can be classified as Brabantian), while Limburgish varieties are also spoken outside of Limburg in small stretches of Brabant (e.g. in Cranendonck). In Germany, the South Low Franconian dialect area stretches from the districts of Heinsberg and Viersen at the Dutch-German border to the Bergisches Land region and includes the cities of Mönchengladbach, Viersen, Düsseldorf, Krefeld, Remscheid, Solingen.

Neighboring dialect groups are Brabantian to the west, Kleverlandish to the north, Westphalian to the east, and Ripuarian to the southeast.

== Status ==
The vitality of local South Low Fraconian dialects in everyday usage contrasts sharply between the three countries where they are spoken. A sociolinguistic study of three varieties spoken in close proximity in Belgium, Germany and the Netherlands at the turn of the century found that dialect usage coupled with a positive language attitude ranked highest in the Netherlands and lowest in Germany. For the Bergish area as the easternmost part of the South Low Fraconian dialect area, Peter Wiesinger already noted in 1970 that many dialects were only retained in the speech of the oldest generation, or even had entirely disappeared.

In the Netherlands, all local dialects in the province of Limburg gained recognition as regional language (streektaal) in 1997. These are for the most part Limburgish (i.e. South Low Franconian) varieties, but also include Kleverlandish and Ripuarian dialects. South Low Fraconian has no special status in Germany. An initiative for official recognition as regional language in Belgium failed in 2009.

== Classification ==
=== South Low Franconian in the West Germanic dialect continuum ===
South Low Franconian is commonly classified as a branch of Low Franconian next to the West Low Franconian dialect groups (including West Flemish, Brabantian, and Hollandic among others). It shares several characteristics with other Low Franconian varieties; for instance, all Low Franconian varieties did not take part in the High German consonant shift, a conservative feature shared with Low German, nor in the North Sea Germanic levelling of plural verb endings (also retained in High German).

Nevertheless, South Low Franconian is set apart from other Low Franconian dialect groups by several points of agreement with High German, especially the Ripuarian dialect group. For this reason, South Low Franconian has been called "Ripuarian–Low Franconian transitional area" (ripuarisch-niederfränkisches Übergangsgebiet) in German dialectology by some scholars such as Theodor Frings and Peter Wiesinger. Based on the historical developments of their vowels, Wiesinger in fact classified the South Low Franconian varieties of Germany as Ripuarian dialects that were mainly distinguished from Ripuarian proper by their consonantism that has not been affected by the High German consonant shift.

=== Internal classification ===
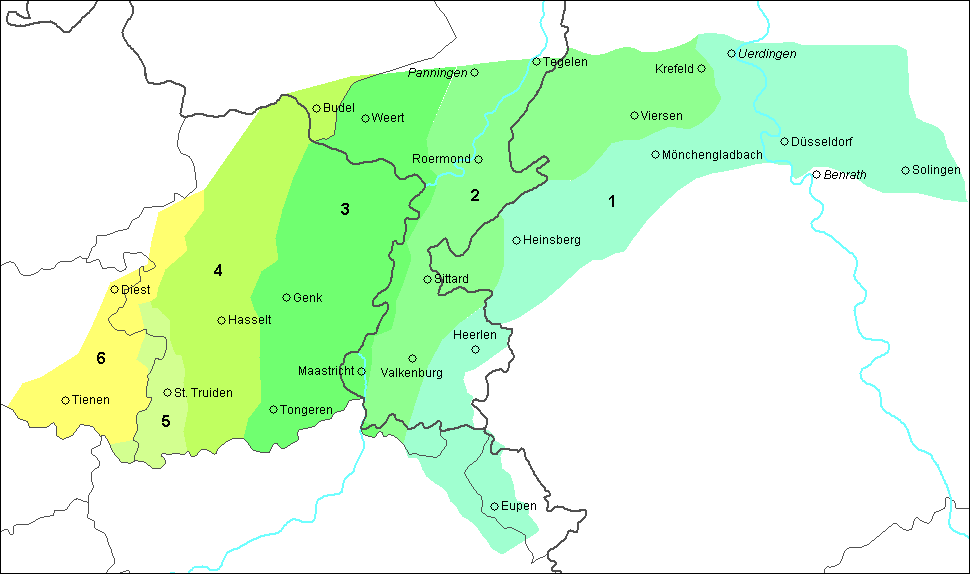
1 = East Limburgish–Ripuarian transitional area 2 = East Limburgish 3 = Central Limburgish (including the C. Limburgish–W. Limburgish transitional area) 4 = West Limburgish 5+6 = West Limburgish–South Brabantian transitional area (the line that divides areas 5 and 6 is the Gete line)

The scope of South Low Franconian is demarcated by the Benrath line to the southeast and the divide between the Germanic and Romance languages to the south. Its western and northern extent is traditionally defined by the arc-shaped Uerdingen line that stretches from the eastern part of Flemish Brabant to Wermelskirchen. Within the South Low Franconian area, Goossens identified the following dialect groups:

- the East Limburgish–Ripuarian transitional area
- East Limburgish
- Central Limburgish
- the Central Limburgish–West Limburgish transitional area
- West Limburgish
- the West Limburgish–South Brabantian transitional area

The first four groups are characterized by the phonemic contrast between /s/ and /ʃ/ as a result of the sound shift *sk- > /ʃ/ (e.g. *skrîƀan > /ʃriːvə/ 'to write') that is also found in High German. In East Limburgish and the East Limburgish–Ripuarian transitional area, *s has further shifted to /ʃ/ before the consonants /p, t, m, n, l, w/. The dialects of the transitional area show many points of agreement with neighboring Ripuarian dialects, such as the form /zɑːɣə/ 'to say' (against /zɛgə/ or /zɛɣə/ in the other South Low Franconian varieties). West Limburgish and the transitional area to the west of it do not have phonemic /ʃ/.

The Central Limburgish–West Limburgish transitional area is characterized by a number of isoglosses that spread from Genk to the south in a fan-like manner. West Limburgish is separated from the West Limburgish–South Brabantian transitional area by the "accent line", i.e. the westermost limit of the area where Franconian tone accent occurs. This transitional area is in turn divided by the "Gete line", a bundle of multiple isoglosses. In the dialects to the west of the Gete line (called Westgetelands or simply Getelands), Brabantian features dominate over Limburgish features; consequently, these dialects are generally considered Brabantian in modern classifications.

The easternmost varieties spoken in the Bergisches Land region east of the Rhine river form a distinct subgroup, viz. the Bergish dialects.

== Characteristics ==
South Low Franconian is the northernmost dialect group in the Rhenish fan. Being located between the Benrath and Uerdingen lines, it generally has not taken part in the High German consonant shift, but at the same time, a few lexical items have /x/ for *k in final position, most iconically ich /ix/ 'I' against ik in West Low Franconian varieties (including Standard Dutch). (Note: This iconic characteristic was even featured on the cover of the book Een eeuw Limburgse dialectologie ("A century of Limburgian dialectology") with the sentence "ich maak" projected onto a map of the area between the Benrath and Uerdingen lines.) However, this single feature is only one of many characteristics of the South Low Franconian varieties, and the role of the Uerdingen line as the major western and northern boundary of South Low Franconian has long been challenged by many scholars.

Another characteristic of South Low Franconian dialects that is easily identified even by non-specialists is the suprasegmental phonological feature of the Franconian tone accent, which also occurs in Central Franconian (= Ripuarian and Moselle Franconian). The extent of the area where pitch accent occurs does not fully overlap with the area defined by the Uerdingen line. In the west, it has a narrower scope and only reaches to the border between West Limburgish and the West Limburgish–South Brabantian transitional area, whereas to the north and northeast, it goes beyond the Uerdingen line and includes the dialects of Venlo, Duisburg and Mülheim. Within the Rhenish pitch accent area, South Low Franconian dialects form a distinct subarea with tone rules that slightly differ from those in Ripuarian and Moselle Franconian, although a few Ripuarian dialects follow the South Low Franconian pattern (e.g. the dialect of Kerkrade) and vice versa (e.g. the dialect of Eupen).

Other distinctive features of South Low Franconian that set it off from other Low Franconian varieties have a more limited scope, especially in the westernmost part:

- A typical conservative feature is the retention of the Proto-West Germanic long high monophthongs *î and *û (e.g. /diːk/ 'dike', /huːs/ 'house' in Maasbracht, Central Limburgish), that is shared with neighboring dialect groups to the north (Kleverlandish), east (Low Saxon) and south (Ripuarian). However, the South Low Franconian dialects to the west of Central Limburgish have taken part in the Brabantian-Hollandic diphthongization (e.g. /daik/ 'dike', /haus/ 'house' in Tongeren, Central Limburgish–West Limburgish transitional area), with the exception of the northernmost part of the West Limburgish area.
- Preservation of the original second person singular pronoun /duː/ (sometimes represented by a generalized form of the earlier accusative form /dix/) goes beyond the Uerdingen line in the transitional northern area and largely overlaps with the northernmost extension of pitch accent. In the west, Central Limburgish is again the westernmost area where /duː/ occurs, plus the eastern half of the West Limburgish–Central Limburgish transitional area. To the north and west, the second person singular pronoun was replaced by the corresponding plural pronoun (cf. Dutch gij, jij).
- The High German split of the Proto-West Germanic diphthongs *ai and *au to *ai/*au and *ê/*ô (depending on the following consonant) extends as far as Central Limburgish and much of the West Limburgish–Central Limburgish transitional area. For example, the Central Limburgish dialect of As reflects *ai as /ei/ in /bein/ 'bone' and /iə/ (< *ê) in /sniə/ 'snow'. Again, this feature goes beyond the Uerdingen line in the northern and northwestern part of the South Low Franconian area.

== See also ==
- Dialect continuum
