= Rhenish fan =

Distinctive differences between neighbouring Rhenish dialects

The subdivision of West Central German into a series of dialects, according to the differing extent of the High German consonant shift, is particularly pronounced. It is known as the Rhenish fan (German: Rheinischer Fächer, Dutch: Rijnlandse waaier) because on the map of dialect boundaries, the lines form a fan shape. Here, no fewer than eight isoglosses, named after places on the Rhine River, run roughly west to east. They partially merge into a simpler system of boundaries in East Central German. The table below lists the isoglosses (bold, in light fields) and the main resulting dialects (italics, in dark fields), arranged from north to south.

== Chart ==
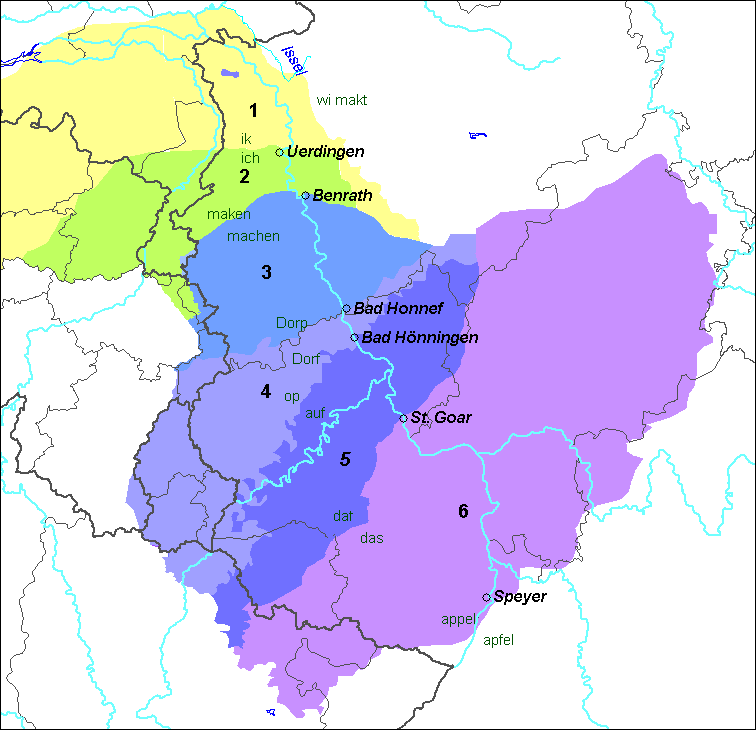
The Rhenish fan: Low Franconian: 1 North Low Franconian 2 South Low Franconian West Central German: 3 Ripuarian Franconian 4 & 5 Mosel Franconian 6 Rhenish Franconian

Dialects and isoglosses of the Rhenish fan (Arranged from north to south: dialects in dark fields, isoglosses in light fields) (Note: I.e., it is arranged like this: northern dialect: Isogloss / northern form / southern form; southern dialect)
North Low Franconian (Kleverlandish, East Bergish) / Low German
| Uerdingen line (Uerdingen) (Uerdinger Linie) | ik/ick | ich |
South Low Franconian (Limburgish)
| Benrath line (Benrather Linie) (Boundary: Low German — Central German) | maken | machen |
Ripuarian Franconian (Cologne, Bonn, Aachen)
| (Dorp/Dorf-Linie or Eifel-Schranke/Eifelschranke) (State border NRW–RP) | Dorp | Dorf |
Northern Moselle Franconian (Luxembourgish, Trier)
| | up | uf |
Southern Moselle Franconian (Koblenz, Saarland)
| Bacharach line (Bacharach) (dat/das-Linie or Hunsrück-Schranke/Hunsrückschranke or Bacharacher Linie) | dat, wat | das, was |
Rhenish Franconian (Pfälzisch, Frankfurt)
| Speyer line (Speyer) (Speyrer Linie) (Boundary: Central German — Upper German) | Appel | Apfel |
| Germersheim line (Germersheim) (Germersheimer Linie) (Boundary: Central German — Upper German) | Pund | Pfund |
Upper German
