= Eupen dialect =

Dialect spoken in Eupen, Belgium

- Öüpener Platt
- Region: Eupen-Malmedy, Belgium
- Language family: Indo-European: Germanic; West Germanic; Low Franconian; South Low Franconian (Limburgish); East Limburgish – Ripuarian transitional area; Eupen dialect
- Writing system: Latin

Language codes
- ISO 639-3: –
- Glottolog: None

Eupen dialect (Öüpener Platt, German: Eupener Platt) is the dialect spoken in the city Eupen.

== Classification ==
The Eupener dialect is part of a dialect continuum between Limburgish and Ripuarian. Klaus-Jürgen Fiacre considers it to be a Low Franconian variety, and therefore closer to the former.

== Geographic distribution ==
Today, it is used less than other similar dialects in adjacent municipalities, like the dialects of Welkenraedt, Gemmenich or Montzen east of Eupen. The younger residents of Eupen tend to speak Standard German instead. West of Eupen, Wallonian dialects of French are spoken.

=== Status ===
As the Eupen dialect is used by the German minority in Belgium, it is considered to be a dialect of German just like Ripuarian in Germany.

== Linguistic features ==
One of the characteristics of the Eupen dialect is diphthongization to [ai, au, ou]; compare Eupen Haint, Aindere, Maunt and lowpe with Dutch Limburgish hand, andere, moond and lòpe.

Nouns are always capitalized, following German conventions.

== Bibliography ==
- Theissen, Siegfried (2013). Neues Wörterbuch der Eupener Mundart. GEV, Grenz-Echo Verlag. ISBN 978-3-86712-078-4.
- Theissen, Siegfried (2015). Neues Wörterbuch der Eupener Mundart : Nachfolgeband. self publishing. ISBN 978-3-86712-078-4.
- Tonnar, August; Evers, Wilhelm; Altenburg, Wilhelm (1970) [1899]. Wörterbuch der Eupener Sprache (reprint ed.). Wiesbaden: M. Sändig Reprint Verlag.
