= Palatine German dialects =

West Franconian dialect of German

Palatine German
- Pälzisch
- Native to: Palatinate; Pennsylvania Dutch Country
- Ethnicity: Palatine
- Native speakers: (undated figure of 400,000)
- Language family: Indo-European: Germanic; West Germanic; Weser-Rhine Germanic; West Central German; Rhine Franconian; Pfälzisch–Lothringisch; Palatine German
- Early forms: Proto-Indo-European: Proto-Germanic; Frankish; Old High Franconian; Old Rhine Franconian
- Dialects: Pennsylvania Dutch
- Writing system: Latin (German alphabet)

Language codes
- ISO 639-3: pfl
- Glottolog: pala1330

Palatine German (Standard German: Pfälzisch [ˈp͡fɛlt͡sɪʃ], endonym: Pälzisch) is a group of Rhine Franconian dialects spoken in the Upper Rhine Valley, roughly in the area between Zweibrücken, Kaiserslautern, Alzey, Worms, Ludwigshafen am Rhein, Mannheim, Odenwald, Heidelberg, Speyer, Landau, Wörth am Rhein and the border to Alsace and Lorraine, in France, but also beyond.

The English term Palatine refers to the Palatinate region (German: Pfalz). Almost all traditional dialects of the Palatinate belong to the Palatine dialect group, but the Palatine speech area also extends to the west and east into neighboring regions (Saarland, Kurpfalz, southern Hesse). The main dialect divisions within Palatine German are Westpfälzisch (also called Hinterpfälzisch) and Vorderpfälzisch (also called Ostpfälzisch).

The Pennsylvania Dutch language is descended primarily from the Palatine German that was spoken by Palatines who immigrated to North America from the 17th to the 19th centuries and maintained their native language. Danube Swabians in Croatia and Serbia also use many elements of Palatine German.

== Characteristics ==
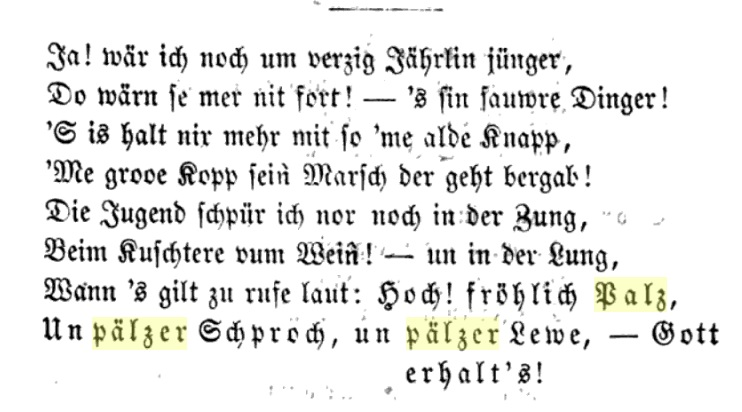
A poem written in a literary form of Palatine, Fraktur script

To the northwest, Palatine German is separated from Moselle Franconian by the das/dat-isogloss (Palatine German uses das or similar forms) and the absence of Rhenish pitch accent. To the southeast, it borders on South Franconian, separated by the Appel/Apfel-line (Palatine German: Appel). Within the greater Rhine Franconian dialect area, the traditional defining isoglosses are the northern fescht/fest-line that separates Palatine German (fescht) from the Hessian dialects (fest), and the southern Haus/Hus-line that separates Palatine German (Haus) from Lorraine Franconian (Hus).

Like other Rhine Franconian dialects, Palatine German has e-apocope (i.e. loss of earlier final -e), n-apocope (i.e. loss of earlier final n in the suffix -en) and /oː/ for earlier long a, e.g. Strooß/Strooße 'street'/'streets' (cf. Standard German Straße/Straßen). The major division of Palatine German into Westpfälzisch and Vorderpfälzisch is based on a bundle of distinguishing features, such as:

- Westpfälzisch lacks the suffix -en in the past participle of strong verbs (e.g. gebroch 'broken', geschripp 'written'). In Vorderpfälzisch, the suffix is retained as -e (with apocope of n, e.g. gebroche, geschriwwe).
- Loss of medial g in Westpfälzisch in words like frooe /froːə/ (cf. Standard German fragen). In Vorderpfälzisch, it is retained as a voiced velar fricative (frooche /froːɣə/).
- Westpfälzisch han/hun '(I) have' against Vorderpfälzisch hap/häp.

== Samples ==
Here are some words in Palatine German with their Standard German equivalents:

Vorderpfälzisch	Westpfälzisch	Standard German	English equivalent
Mais	Mais	Mäuse	mice
Lais	Lais	Läuse	lice
Grumbeea	Grumbeer	Kartoffel	potato
Schnook	Schdechmick	Stechmücke	mosquito
Bääm	Bääm	Bäume	trees
Bää	Bää	Beine	legs
Schdää	Schdää	Stein	stone
soi	sei	sein	his (possessive) / to be
unsa	unser	unsere	ours
net (nit)	net	nicht	not
dowedder/dewedda	degeche	dagegen	against
Fisch (Fusch)	Fisch	Fisch	fish
ebbes	ebbes	etwas	something
Ärwett	Arwett	Arbeit	work
Doa	Dor	Tor	gate
Abbel	Abbel	Apfel	apple
hawwe	hann	haben	have
Haffe	Hawwe	Kochtopf	pot (saucepan)

This sentence is pronounced in Vorderpfälzisch:

Isch habb's'm [habb es em] schunn vazehlt, awwa 'r [er] hat ma 's [es] nit geglaabt.

In Westpfälzisch, it would be the following:

Ich hann's'm schunn verzehlt, awwer er had mer's net geglaabt.

In Standard German, the sentence would read:

Ich habe es ihm schon erzählt, aber er hat es mir nicht geglaubt.

In English, it means:

I have already told [it to] him, but he didn't believe me.

Hasche aa Hunger? (Westpfälzisch)

Haschd ach Hunga? (Vorderpfälzisch)

Hast du auch Hunger? (Standard German)

Are you hungry too? (English)

== Grammar ==
Grammatically, all Palatine dialects do not use the genitive case, which is replaced by the dative, with or without von, and most dialects have no imperfect tense but only the perfect.

== Notable speakers ==
- Helmut Kohl (German Chancellor 1982–1998)

== See also ==
- Lorraine Franconian
- Riograndenser Hunsrückisch
