= Bönnsch dialect =

Ripuarian dialect of Bonn, Germany

Bönnsch
- Region: city of Bonn and bordering areas of Rhein-Sieg district (Germany)
- Native speakers: (undated figure of probably fewer than 50,000 active users) number of people with passive knowledge greater
- Language family: Indo-European: Germanic; West Germanic; High German; Central German; West Central German; Central Franconian; Ripuarian; Bönnsch

Language codes
- ISO 639-3: –
- Glottolog: None

Bönnsch is a Ripuarian dialect of German, which is spoken in Bonn and the bordering municipalities.

Bönnsch is very similar to the more northern Kölsch of Cologne and distinct from the latter only in particular points. One can find a main difference and some other features, which however do not occur among all speakers or are being levelled more and more due to the influence of Standard German and also Kölsch itself (which is more present in culture and broadcasting).

In private life (family, friends, clubs, local pubs etc.), the dialect is still used relatively frequently in the region. However, it has almost vanished as a vernacular in public places. Almost all speakers of Bönnsch use an adapted kind of Standard German when talking to people who do not belong to their private circle of acquaintances (see Rhinelandic regiolect).

== Characteristical monophthongization ==
The main characteristic of Bönnsch in comparison to Kölsch is the absence of word-internal original diphthongs.

Ancient Germanic au and ai are realized [oʊ] and [eɪ] in Kölsch (similar to the vowels in English gold and take). In Bönnsch, they merge with the long vowels [oː] and [eː].

English	Standard German	Kölsch	Bönnsch
"to walk"	laufen [ˈlaʊfn̩]	laufe [ˈlôʊfə]	loofe [ˈloːfə]
"eye"	Auge [ˈaʊɡə]	Auch [oʊx]	Ooch [oːx]
"to be called"	heißen [ˈhaɪsn̩]	heiße [ˈhêɪsə]	heeße [ˈheːsə]
"one"	eins [aɪns]	ein [eɪn]	een [eːn]

Note that these monophthongs do not occur word-finally. Thus both Bönnsch and Kölsch use zwei ("two") and Dau ("push").

In Standard German, ancient Germanic au und ai have been preserved. However, Standard German later merged Germanic ū and ī with these diphthongs, which occurred neither in Bönnsch nor Kölsch. Therefore, some Standard German rhyming couplets do not exist in the Ripuarian dialects. For example, standard heiß ~ weiß vs. Bönnsch heeß ~ wieß (English "hot" and "white"); standard kaufen ~ saufen vs. Bönnsch koofe ~ suffe (English "buy" and "drink").

Contrariwise, Kölsch often contracts the combinations ir and ur into [eː] and [oː]. In this case, Bönnsch preserves two diphthongs which emerged through vocalization of r. Thus one says Vierdel [ˈfɪə̯dəl] instead of Kölsch Veedel ("quarter") and hä wurd [ʋʊə̯t] instead of Kölsch hä wood ("he became").

== Other features ==
Some Bönnsch speakers do not distinguish the grammatical endings -e and -er and pronounce both of them [ə] (as in English antenna). This peculiarity is declining in actual usage, but is still well known as a typical feature of Bönnsch.

As many Rhinelandic language varieties, when compare to Standard German, Bönnsch phonetically distinguishes much less between the phonemes /ç/ and /ʃ/. Contrary to Kölsch, both appear like [ç] in Bönnsch, at least to non-Bönnsch listeners. Whether or not there are still two different phonemes in Bönnsch, which are distinguished at least by natives, is an open question.

The auxiliary verb sinn ("to be") traditionally uses the infinitive form for the 1st person singular of the present tense, thus: ich sinn for "I am". Kölsch uses ich ben, which is closer to Standard German (bin) and therefore has become quite common in Bonn as well.

For historical reasons, the Bönnsch vocabulary has a rural imprint and has preserved some Middle High German words, which have long died out in the urban Kölsch. Moreover, the Bönnsch pronunciation is thought to be softer and its intonation is considered to be (even) more rhythmic than that of Kölsch. However, such characteristics are difficult to measure and may vary greatly among speakers.

Finally, there are different forms for individual words, e.g. Bönnsch att instead of Kölsch allt ("already"), donn instead of dunn ("to do"), ühr doot instead of ehr deit ("you [all] do"), du siss instead of do sühs ("thou seest").

== Examples ==
In German studies, the German dialects are characterized and compared to each other by means of the so-called Wenker sentences. The first three of these forty sentences are rendered in Bönnsch as follows.

- Em Winte fleeje de drüjje Blaade en de Luff eröm. − In winter, the dry leaves are flying around in the air.
- Et hürt jlich op ze schneie, dann wird et Wedde widde besse. − It will soon stop snowing, then the weather is getting better again.
- Donn Kolle en de Ovve, dat de Mellech baal et Koche aanfängk. − Put (pieces of) coal in the oven so that the milk will start boiling soon.

== Bibliography ==
- Herbert Weffer (2000). Von aach bes zwöllef - Ein bönnsches Wörterbuch (in German and Kölsch). Vol. 1 (2nd ed.). Bonn: Hrsg. Bonner Genealogischer Arbeitskreis.
- Herbert Weffer (2000). Bönnsches Wörterbuch (in German and Kölsch). Vol. 2 (1st ed.). Bonn: Hrsg. Westdeutsche Gesellschaft für Familienkunde, Bezirksgruppe Bonn.
