= Bönsch =

Bönsch (also Boensch) is a German language surname. Notable people with the name include:

- Eugen Bönsch (1897–1951), Austro-Hungarian World War I flying ace
- Fred Boensch (1920–2000), American football player
- Hord Boensch (1893–1924), American college football player

== See also ==
- Bönnsch dialect
