= South Guelderish =

West Germanic dialects

South Guelderish (Dutch: Zuid-Gelders [ˌzœytˈxɛldərs]; German: Südgeldersch) is a Dutch dialect area proposed by Jo Daan that encompasses the Veluwezoom National Park, Rijk van Nijmegen, Land van Maas en Waal, the Bommelerwaard, the Tielerwaard, the Betuwe, and Liemers.
