= Wachtendonck Psalms =

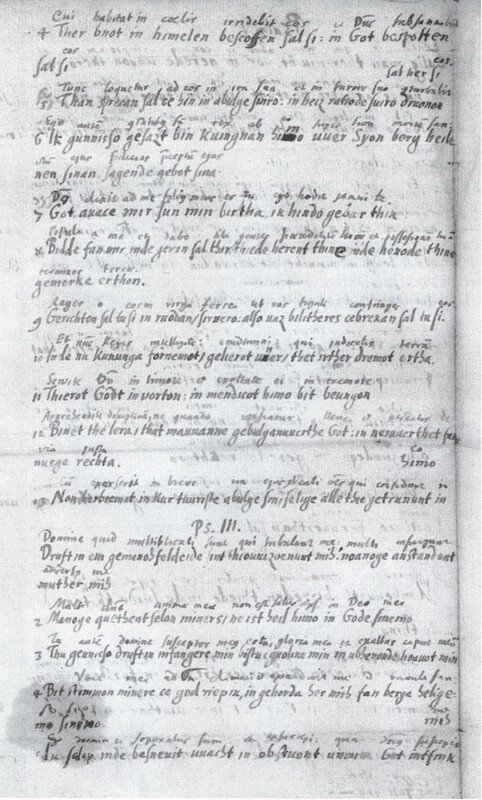
Partial copy of the Wachtendonck Psalms from around 1600 with notes by Justus Lipsius. The original work (from approximately 900, which has been lost) may be considered the oldest Dutch book.

The Wachtendonck Psalms are a collection of Latin psalms, with a translation in an eastern variety of Old Dutch (Old Low Franconian). It contains a number of Old High German elements, because it was probably based on a Middle Franconian original. Very little remains of them. The psalms were named after a manuscript which has not come down to us, but out of which scholars believe the surviving fragments must have been copied. This manuscript was once owned by Liège Canon Arnold Wachtendonck. He was supervisor over Munsterbilzen Abbey, where he found the manuscript.

The surviving fragments are handwritten copies made by the Renaissance scholar Justus Lipsius in the sixteenth century. Lipsius made a number of separate copies of apparently the same material and these versions do not always agree. In addition, scholars conclude that the numerous errors and inconsistencies in the fragments point not only to some carelessness or inattentiveness by the Renaissance scholars but also to errors in the now lost manuscript out of which the material was copied.

The language of the Psalms suggests that they were originally written in the 10th century. A number of editions exist, among others by the 19th-century Dutch philologist Willem Lodewijk van Helten and, more recently, the diplomatic edition by the American historical linguist Robert L. Kyes (1969) and the critical edition by the Dutch philologist Arend Quak (1981). As might be expected from an interlinear translation, the word order of the Old Franconian text very closely follows that of the Latin original.
