= Jan Goossens (linguist) =

Belgian dialectologist (born 1930)

- Born: 19 February 1930 (age 96); Genk, Belgium
- Occupation: Linguist

Academic background
- Education: KU Leuven

Academic work
- Institutions: University of Münster
- Main interests: Dutch and Low Franconian philology

Jan Goossens (born 19 February 1930 in Genk, Belgium) is a Belgian historical linguist and dialectologist. His main interest is the philology and history of Dutch and the Low Franconian and Low Saxon dialects of the Low Countries and Germany.

== Career ==
Goossens studied Germanic philology at the Catholic University of Leuven and received a doctoral degree in 1960. In 1961, he became lecturer at the University of Marburg, in 1965 he became professor in Leuven, and in 1969 he joined University of Münster where he was professor for Dutch philology until his retirement in 1995.

Goossens is a member of the Royal Academy of Dutch Language and Literature. In 1986, he received the Großes Verdienstkreuz of the Federal Republic of Germany. In 2009, Goossens became honorary citizen of his hometown Genk.

== Selected works ==
- Semantische vraagstukken uit de taal van het landbouwbedrijf (1963)
- Strukturelle Sprachgeographie (1969)
- Historische Phonologie des Niederländischen (1974)
- Inleiding tot de Nederlandse dialectologie (1970, 1976²)
- Deutsche Dialektologie (1976)
- Middelnederlandse vocaalsystemen (1980)
- Reynaerts Historie – Reynke de Vos (1983)
- Fränkischer Sprachatlas (1981, 1988, 1994, 2002)
- Fonologische atlas van de Nederlandse dialecten (1998, 2000, 2005)
