= Limburgish =

South/Eastern branch of Low Franconian spoken in and around Limburg

- Limburgan, Limburgian, Limburgic, East Low Franconian, South Low Franconian
- Limbörgs, Limburgs, Lèmburgs
- Pronunciation: [ˈlɪm˦bʏʀ(ə)xs, ˈlɛm˦-]
- Native to: Netherlands: Limburg; Belgium: Limburg; Liège; Germany: North Rhine-Westphalia
- Region: Limburg (Netherlands) Limburg (Belgium)
- Native speakers: 800,000 (2025) unknown number in Germany
- Language family: Indo-European: Germanic; West Germanic; Weser–Rhine Germanic; Low Franconian; Limburgish
- Writing system: Latin

Official status
- Recognised minority language in: Netherlands – Statutory provincial language in Limburg Province (1996, Ratification Act, ECRML, No. 136), effective 1997.
- Regulated by: Veldeke Limburg (unofficial), Raod veur 't Limburgs (unofficial)

Language codes
- ISO 639-1: li
- ISO 639-2: lim
- ISO 639-3: lim
- Glottolog: limb1263 Limburgan
- Linguasphere: 52-ACB-al

Limburgish (Limburgs [ˈlɪm˦bʏʀ(ə)xs] or Lèmburgs [ˈlɛm˦-]; Dutch: Limburgs [ˈlɪmbʏr(ə)xs]; also Limburgian, Limburgic or Limburgan) is the Dutch designation for a group of closely related language varieties spoken in most of Belgian and Dutch Limburg and in the adjacent areas of North Rhine-Westphalia. In German, the term "Limburgish" is uncommon and most of these dialects are included in South Low Franconian.

The Limburgish dialects lack a standardized form and instead comprise multiple varieties, each with its own distinctive features. A characteristic feature of many dialects of Limburgish is the occurrence of a lexical pitch accent (Franconian tone accent), which these dialects adopted from and share with the adjacent Central Franconian dialects of German.

In Belgium and Germany, Limburgish dialects have no formal legal status. In the Netherlands, Limburgish has been officially recognized as a regional language by the Dutch government since 1997, although both the procedure and the argumentation with which this came about have proved controversial.

== Etymology ==
The name Limburgish (and variants of it) derives only indirectly from the now Belgian town of Limbourg (Laeboer in Limburgish, IPA: /ˈlæːbuʁ/), which was the capital of the Duchy of Limburg during the Middle Ages. More directly it is derived from the more modern name of the Province of Limburg (1815–39) in the Kingdom of the Netherlands, which has been split today into a Belgian Limburg and a Dutch Limburg. In the area around the old Duchy of Limburg the main language today is French, but there is also a particular cluster of Limburgish (or Limburgish-like, depending on definitions) dialects. The use of the word Limburgish is first attested at the close of the 19th century.

People from Limburg usually call their language plat, a term also used by speakers of Low Saxon to refer to their respective dialects.

== Definition ==
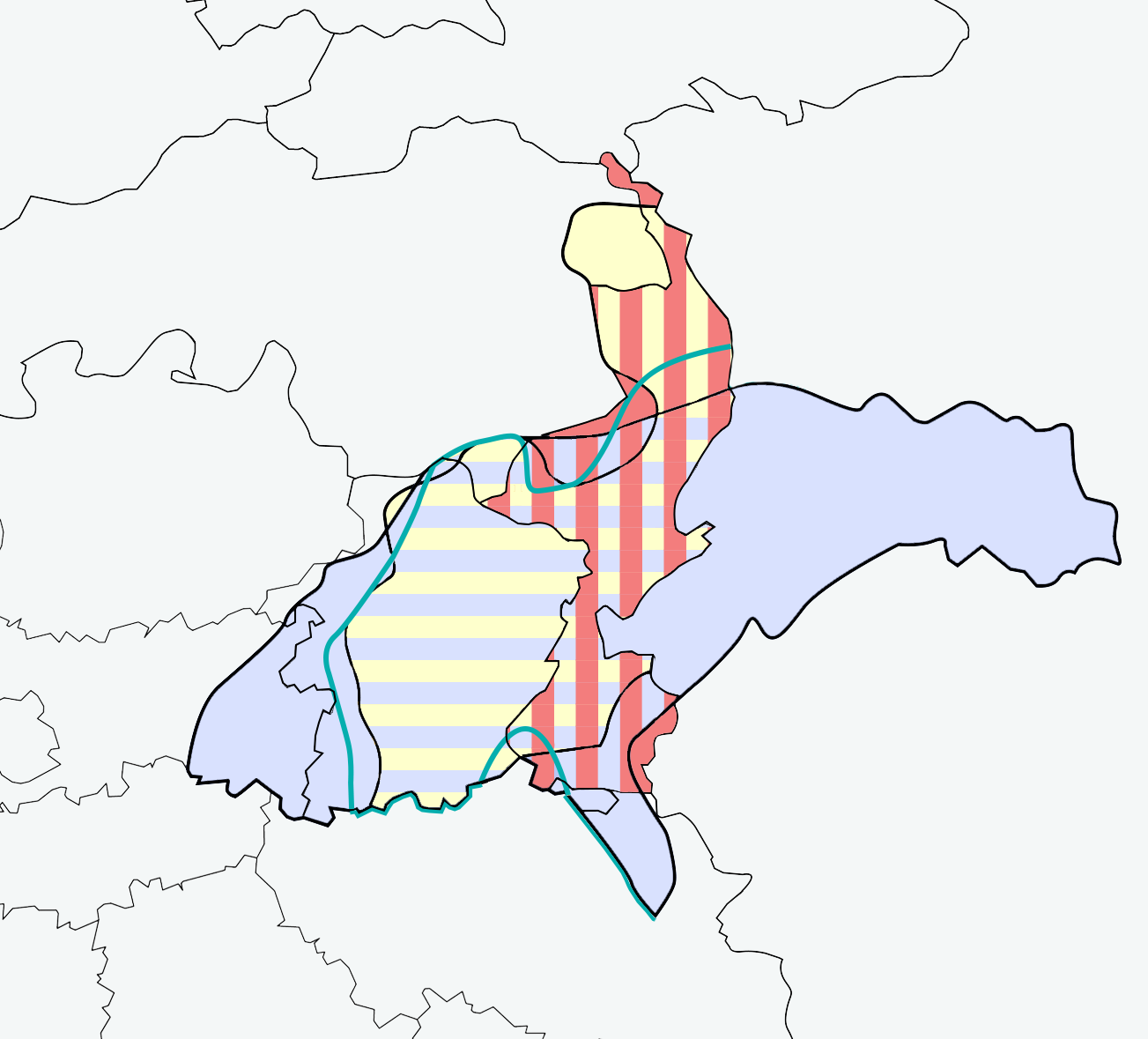
Overlap and Delimitation between East Low Franconian and Various Definitions of “Limburgish”: East Low Franconian including transitional dialects, without internal subdivisions. The "Limburg group" (without internal subdivisions) based on the feature frequency method. The area where local dialects are defined as "Limburgish" by the Dutch state and protected as regional language. Definition of Limburgish based on tonality within the broader Dutch language area.

There are various interpretations of the Limburgish dialect area, and its delineation depends on the definition employed.

In everyday usage in the Netherlands and Belgium, the term “Limburgish” generally refers to the endogenous language varieties spoken in the two Limburg provinces. Within Belgian and Dutch Limburg itself, however, a more nuanced socio-linguistic definition prevails. For most Limburgers, “Limburgish” as such does not exist; instead, speakers primarily identify their individual dialect with their town or region or more generally as plat, the colloquial term for “dialect”. For them, the label “Limburgish” is typically applied to those dialects with which mutual communication is possible without substantial adaptation of one’s own variety. This definition covers most, though not all, dialects spoken within the provinces. For instance, the dialects in the North of Dutch Limburg are not necessarily considered Limburgish, and speakers of the Kerkrade dialect — although the speakers themselves classify their dialect as Limburgish — tend to adjust their speech and choice of words when interacting with speakers of the more none-peripheral Limburgish varieties, due to the relatively divergent character of their dialect.

In administrative law, under the provisions of the European Charter for Regional or Minority Languages, “Limburgish” is defined for the purposes of Dutch legislation as “the regional language which, in various forms, is spoken in the Dutch province of Limburg.”

From a linguistic perspective, “Limburgish” has traditionally denoted the Low Franconian varieties spoken between the Benrath Line (maken/machen) and the Uerdingen Line (ik/ich). The defining characteristic of these dialects, within this definition, is their partial participation in the Second Germanic consonant shift, which spread concentrically from Cologne northwestwards, diminishing in intensity, as part of the so-called Rhenish fan. A more recent linguistic definition, which overlaps with but does not fully coincide with the traditional one, delineates Limburgish dialects in the stricter sense on the basis of the distribution of tonal accent within the southeastern Low Franconian varieties.

Regardless of the exact definition used, the term Limburgish itself is specific to the Netherlands and Belgium, where it used by linguists and laymen alike and is strongly connected to the cultural and regional identity of the inhabitants of both Belgian and Dutch Limburg. This regional identity is notably absent from the speakers of closely related Low Franconian dialects in adjacent parts of Germany, who do not refer to their local dialects as Limburgish. In German linguistic discourse too, the term is uncommon with German linguists instead tending to use Southern Low Franconian (German: Südniederfränkisch), which, depending on the definition used, can refer to the same dialect grouping.

=== Status ===
==== Netherlands ====
In the aftermath of the Netherlands’ inclusion of Low Saxon under the European Charter for Regional or Minority Languages in 1996, the Province of Limburg asked the Veldeke dialect association to investigate to what extent Limburgish could claim the same status. In response, Veldeke established a working group, whose primary task was to examine whether Limburgish met the same criteria on which the earlier recognition of Low Saxon had been based.

The working group did not assess Limburgish separately against the relatively limited requirements of the Charter, but instead compared its linguistic features with those of Frisian and Low Saxon, both of which had already been recognized. On the basis of attestations by three external experts, the group concluded that Limburgish fulfilled the criteria at least as strongly as Low Saxon and would therefore qualify for inclusion under the Charter. The working group emphasized that recognition of Limburgish should not be regarded as an intervention in scientific terminology or linguistic practice, but rather as a public-law recognition of cultural variation and diversity within the Limburgish dialects and of their position in relation to Standard Dutch. Accordingly, the group’s advice explicitly refrained from making claims about the status of Limburgish as a “language” or a “dialect,” instead defining it as “the regional language which, in various forms, is spoken in the Dutch province of Limburg.”

In 2000, the Dutch government acknowledged that it would indeed have been wiser to submit the Province of Limburg’s request for review to the Language Union. As a result, the Committee of Ministers of the Language Union agreed that any future requests of this nature would be referred to the Union. A subsequent request to include Zeelandic as a recognized regional language under the Charter was, as an indirect consequence of this agreement, rejected.

==== Belgium ====
Since 24 December 1990, the French Community of Belgium has recognized all indigenous minority dialects that, alongside French, originated within the territory of Brussels and Wallonia as “indigenous regional languages.” This decree covers both Romance and Germanic varieties, which means that Limburgish dialects, although not explicitly mentioned in the legal text, also fall under this recognition within the region.

In the Flemish Community, where the debate gained momentum following the recognition of Limburgish in the Netherlands, the government sought linguistic advice from, among others, the Dutch Language Union. The request to recognize Limburgish there as well was ultimately rejected in 2000.

== Classification ==
The Limburgish dialects are classified as part of Low Franconian, together with the Hollandic, Brabantian, Zeelandic, Flemish, and Kleverlandish dialects. The varieties of Dutch South and Central Limburg are traditionally regarded as Low Franconian (or specifically East Low Franconian) dialects with a gradual Middle German influence, or alternatively as a group of transitional dialects between Low and Middle Franconian.

In historical linguistics, the Limburgish dialects are included within Old Dutch (more specifically Old East Dutch) and Middle Dutch. Within the latter, Limburgish is grouped together with Flemish, Brabantian, Hollandic, and eastern Dutch dialects. Linguistic features in historical Dutch texts that are considered characteristic of Limburgish are referred to as Limburgisms. This term should not be confused with an alternative definition of Limburgism, in which it denotes interference phenomena between dialect and the Dutch standard language.

The linguistic diversity within the Dutch province of Limburg is considerable, since the varieties spoken in North Limburg share many features with Brabantian and Kleverlandish dialects and differ markedly from those of South and Central Limburg. In Belgian Limburg, with the exception of part of the Voeren region, East Limburgish is not spoken; instead, West and Central Limburgish varieties are found. The dialect group spoken in the central part of the province of Limburg represents the transition toward South Brabantian.

The Limburgish dialects are intersected by various isoglosses, both in east–west and north–south directions, and therefore constitute only a limited linguistic unity. One of the most significant of these isoglosses is the Panningen Line, which roughly separates the western and eastern Limburgish dialects. These Limburgish dialects represent the southeasternmost varieties of the Dutch language area.

Because of the adoption of some features associated with the Second Germanic consonant shift, the Limburgish varieties were sometimes seen as West Central German, and as such, as part of High German. This difference is caused by 19th and early 20th century German linguists defining a High German variety as one that has taken part in any of the first three phases of the High German consonant shift.

The traditional terminology can be confusing as the differences between the historical groupings Old West Franconian and Old East Franconian (which mainly concern certain vowel variations and the presence of Ingvaeonic features) is different from the modern dialectal dichotomy between Western and Eastern Low Franconian, which is based on the presence or absence of High German features in Low Franconian, which did not occur until the advent of the Middle Dutch period.

=== Subdivisions ===
Various taxonomies of the Limburgish dialects exist. The one below is based on R. Belemans, J. Kruijsen, J. Van Keymeulen (1998)

- Truierlands
- Lommels (around Lommel)
- Brabants-Limburgs
  - Noorderkempens
  - Zuiderkempens
  - Getelands
- West-Limburgs (West Limburgish)
  - Dommellands
  - Demerkempens
  - Beringerlands (cp. Beringen)
  - Lonerlands
- Centraal-Limburgs (Central Limburgish)
  - Weertlands
  - Horns
  - Maaskempens
  - Centraal-Maaslands
  - Trichterlands
  - Bilzerlands (cp. Bilzen)
  - Tongerlands (cp. Tongeren)
- Oost-Limburgs (East Limburgish)
  - Noordelijk Oost-Limburgs (Northern East Limburgish)
  - Zuidelijk Oost-Limburgs (Southern East Limburgish)
- Zuid-Gelders Limburgs (around Venlo)
- Noord-Gelders Limburgs or Kleverlands

== History ==
After the third century, the dynamics between the Germanic peoples and the Romans along the lower course of the Rhine began to change. Whereas in earlier centuries relations had primarily consisted of trade with occasional raids, the crises that increasingly beset the Roman Empire led to larger numbers of Germanic groups settling on the left bank of the major rivers. These tribes most likely spoke dialects that had developed from Weser-Rhine Germanic, which by the fifth century had merged into what is known as Old Frankish.

The cultural predominance of the Romans nevertheless remained significant, manifesting itself in a relatively gradual transformation of the linguistic landscape and in the adoption of numerous Latin loanwords, particularly in formerly strongly Romanized areas where these Germanic peoples settled. As a result, compared to all other West Germanic varieties, the Limburgish dialects and those of the adjacent Rhineland contain the greatest number of early Latin loanwords, and for a long time, bilingual Romance–Germanic language islands continued to exist in parts of Limburg. The region around Sint-Truiden and the area between Aachen and Vaals, for instance, were only definitively Germanized after the tenth century. Traces of this linguistic development remain, such as in the village of Cadier en Keer near Maastricht, where Cadier represents the Romance evolution and Keer the Germanic evolution of the original Latin word calidarium (a heated bathhouse).

Beginning in the sixth century, the Second Germanic Sound Shift spread northward from southwestern Germany. This development caused Old Frankish to split into a non-shifted variety (Old Dutch, also known as Old Low Franconian) and several shifted varieties: the dialects of Old High German spoken in and around the Middle Rhine. The later Limburgish dialects trace their origins to the eastern branch of Old Dutch. Some of the earliest known Dutch texts are written in this variety, such as the famous Wachtendonck Psalms of the tenth century.

Both East and West Old Dutch contributed to the formation of Middle Dutch, but after the thirteenth century, features characteristic of Flemish and Brabantine (both western dialects) became dominant in the written record. Although Middle Dutch appears relatively homogeneous in writing, this is not assumed to have been the case in the spoken language. Limburgish constitutes one of the five principal dialect groups of Middle Dutch.

The Middle Dutch Limburgish dialects were marked by features of the Second Germanic Sound Shift, which had spread northwestward from the city of Cologne. A specific example is the presence of the ik–ich isogloss in Middle Dutch varieties of Limburgish, whereas the shift from ik to ich had not yet taken place in Old East Dutch (the direct predecessor of the present-day dialects in central and southern Limburg).

Traditionally, the Battle of Worringen (1288) is seen as a turning point in the linguistic history of the Limburgish dialects. Following this battle, the Limburg region reoriented itself: the old Duchy of Limburg, the County of Dalhem, and what is now Dutch South Limburg — collectively known as the Lands of Overmaas — came under the rule of the Duchy of Brabant. Instead of looking primarily to nearby German cities, the region shifted its economic and cultural orientation westward, toward the flourishing Brabantine cities and, further afield, to Ghent, Bruges, and Ypres in Flanders. With the dominance of the Brabantine dialects (the so-called Brabantine expansion), developments in the opposite direction set in: typically Middle Dutch sound changes — such as final devoicing, assimilation, and vowel reduction — spread west-to-east, counteracting the earlier High German influence. The adoption of Brabantine features occurred earliest and most strongly in the dialects west of the Meuse, notably in present-day Belgian Limburg, Maastricht, and Weert.

When, in the early sixteenth century, the first extensive attempts were made to standardize Dutch, Brabantine provided the main basis. After the fall of Antwerp during the Eighty Years’ War, however, the cultural, political, and economic center of gravity shifted to the Northern Netherlands, especially to the province of Holland. The result was that Hollandic — though still influenced by Brabantine — acquired a dominant role in the formation of the Dutch standard language, particularly in pronunciation. Consequently, the Limburgish dialects have left relatively few traces in Standard Dutch. By contrast, the Dutch standard language has exerted an increasing influence on Limburgish, particularly since the nineteenth century, as the dialects have moved progressively closer to Standard Dutch.

The earliest texts written in a Limburgish dialect date from the nineteenth century. A precursor is the Sermoen euver de Weurd (“Sermon on the Words”), composed in Maastricht dialect in 1729. Pioneers in the documentation of Limburgish dialects included Pieter Willems (1840–1898), professor at Leuven University but born and raised in Maastricht, and Joseph Schrijnen (1869–1938), professor first in Utrecht and later in Nijmegen. Their research was, as was common at the time, conducted primarily through written questionnaires.

In the twentieth century, with the rise of radio and television as new media, marked differences arose in the extent to which dialects were spoken in Belgium, the Netherlands, and Germany. In Belgium, the South Low Franconian dialect lost ground to so-called Verkavelingsvlaams, while in Germany the Rhineland regiolect increasingly took hold. The linguistically Limburgish dialects in Germany are also subject to the influence of the German standard language. Under the influence of Cologne broadcaster WDR, Ripuarian accents have been spreading on the left bank of the Rhine, at the expense of the traditional Limburgish and Kleverlandish dialects.

== Speakers ==
In 2012 it was concluded that dialect use in both Limburg provinces as well as in the adjacent Rhineland has been declining with each generation.

A 2021 study by dialect society Veldeke Limburg found that 67% of the inhabitants of Dutch Limburg reported speaking Limburgish fluently. However, there were marked discrepancies by age group: among the youngest cohort surveyed (18–34 years), only 52% reported fluent command of the dialect. More than half of Limburgers expected that the use of Limburgish dialects would decrease in the future, while only 4% believed it would increase.

Alongside Standard Dutch, approximately 57% of Limburgish parents spoke Limburgish with each other in 2003; the percentage who also spoke Limburgish with their children was somewhat lower. This finding corresponds to earlier studies from the 1990s, which indicated that parents tended to consider Standard Dutch more appropriate for addressing their children. Within the Netherlands, dialect use is relatively highest in Limburg.[29] In areas that experienced strong migration flows from other parts of the country, such as the Limburg mining district, the use of the local dialect has weakened. The urban dialect of Heerlen reflects this most clearly, largely due to the higher socio-economic status of Standard-Dutch-speaking migrants in the first half of the twentieth century. In western South Limburg and Central Limburg, Limburgish continues to be spoken relatively most frequently. While the use of Limburgish dialects as spoken language has consistently declined, written use of Limburgish has increased significantly, a trend attributed to the rise of the internet and a reduction in illiteracy.

In Belgian Limburg, various studies have likewise revealed a correlation between age and the proportion of Limburgers who are dialect speakers. For instance, in Bilzen (located between Hasselt and Maastricht), 42% of the population still reported speaking dialect, though this percentage varied substantially by age. Among those over 55 years of age, 60% spoke dialect; among those aged 25–54, this declined to just over 40%; and in the under-25 group, only 11% spoke the local dialect.

=== Sociolinguistics ===
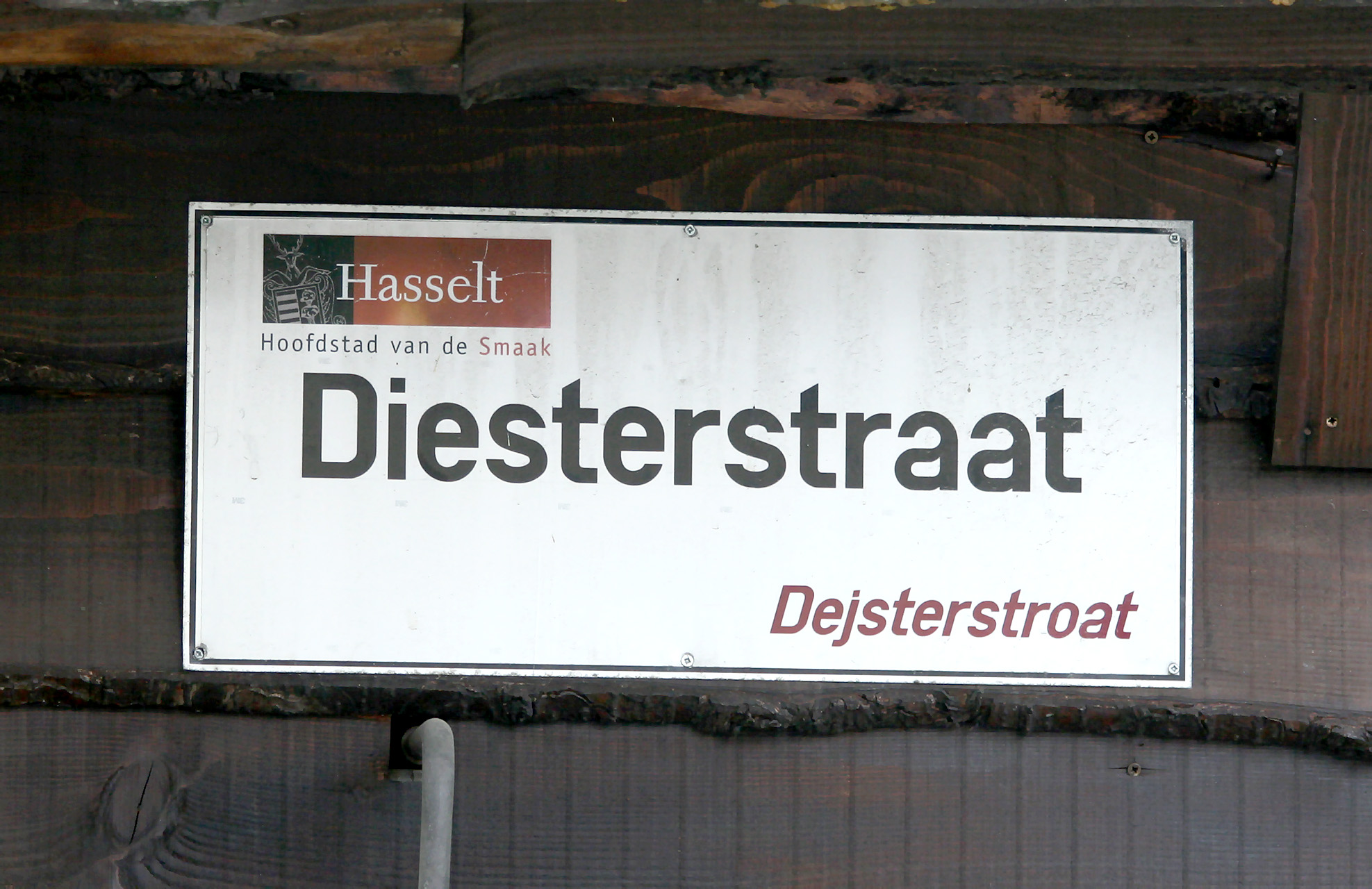
Bilingual signs in Hasselt, Belgium

Until well into the eighteenth century, the Limburgish elite associated the Limburgish dialects with the lower classes and regarded them as subordinate and inferior to written and cultural languages such as Dutch, German, and especially French. In the nineteenth century, appreciation for Limburgish dialects grew in a cultural-historical sense, though their socio-linguistic status remained low. This lower prestige contributed in South Limburg to the emergence of Koelhollands (Limburgish: 'Coal Dutch' a play on both the Dutch word steenkolenengels and the coal mining industry then present in the area): a sociolect formed through the blending of Standard Dutch and Limburgish dialects, as parents believed their children would have better opportunities if they spoke Standard Dutch. In surveys conducted in 1987 and 1997, many speakers of Limburgish dialects nevertheless identified these as their first language.

In Belgian Limburg, the status of Limburgish dialects is clearly demarcated in socio-cultural terms, both positively and negatively. The dialect is the language of informal situations, village life, the workplace, carnival, and folklore, but it is also considered the language of older and less educated people. Within several Limburgish dialects, especially urban ones, class distinctions can also be discerned. Although less pronounced than, for example, in the dialect spoken in The Hague, both the Roermond- and Maastricht dialect exhibit upper and lower class variants. Speakers of upper-class Maastricht-variety, for instance, use significantly more French loanwords.

Within the Dutch dialect renaissance that began in the early 1990s, Limburgish has held a prominent place, particularly through the music of Rowwen Hèze. The band, popular throughout the Netherlands and Belgium, has played a major role in destigmatizing dialect use in the arts, in increasing the visibility of Limburgish among a wider audience, and has developed into an emblem and expression of pride in Limburgish identity.

The degree to which speakers of various Limburgish dialects perceive them as part of a shared “Limburgish” or identify themselves as belonging to a “Limburgish-speaking community” varies considerably. Dialect diversity is traditionally greater among Belgian Limburg dialects than among those of Dutch Limburg, and as a result, Belgian Limburgers generally do not perceive themselves as speaking one and the same language. With the exception of the Maasland region, many Belgian Limburgers do not readily regard their dialects as part of a broader Limburgish construct that also encompasses the varieties of Dutch Limburg.

In Germany, dialect awareness is lowest, and speakers there do not use any overarching term (“Limburgish” or otherwise) for the dialects that could linguistically be seen as Limburgish. By contrast, dialect awareness is relatively high in Dutch Limburg, although even there most people identify the term “Limburgish” primarily with their own local dialect.

The dialects of Dutch Limburg have been converging. The dialectologist Toon Weijnen (1909–2008) demonstrated in 1939 that internal differences between Dutch Limburgish dialects had decreased, possibly as a result of increased mobility. Conversely, since the late nineteenth century, dialects on either side of the national border have been diverging under the influence of Standard German and Standard Dutch. In 1995, it was concluded that dialect speakers from Germany and the Netherlands, unless restricting themselves to very limited topics that could be covered using the older shared vocabulary, could no longer converse across the border without some knowledge of the other standard language.

== Orthography ==
The Limburgish dialects do not constitute a unified language, which means that Limburgish texts are always written in a particular dialect, with spelling conventions often varying from one individual to another. The Limburgish dialect association Veldeke has, however, developed an orthographic system intended for all dialects, with the aim that the same sound be represented in the same way across dialects. This system is known as the Veldeke spelling. The first version was published in 1928, followed by revisions in 1952, 1983, and 2000. Although the spelling system has no official status, it is often described as “officially promoted,” as it is used by both the Raod veur ’t Limburgs and the Veldeke dialect association. The Veldeke spelling is also employed, for example, on bilingual place-name signs in Dutch Limburg. The most recent version of the spelling dates from 2003.

In 1994, the regional journalist Paul Prikken (1946–2013) developed his own standard form, called Algemeen Geschreven Limburgs (“General Written Limburgish”), which he proposed in his dictionary De taal van de Maas and used for his columns in the newspaper De Limburger between 1995 and 2004. This form gained little traction. A proposal to adopt it at the provincial level was rejected. Radboud University, Catholic University of Leuven, Veldeke Limburg, and the Belgian province of Limburg opposed the introduction of a standardized written language, arguing that it would not benefit the great diversity of Limburgish dialects.

== Phonology ==
A Limburgish speaker, recorded in Slovakia

The sound inventory below is based on the variety of West-Limburgs spoken in Montfort (Montfortian dialect).

=== Consonants ===
		Labial	Alveolar	Post- alveolar	Palatal	Velar	Uvular	Glottal
Nasal		m	n		(ɲ)	ŋ		
Plosive / Affricate	voiceless	p	t	t͡ʃ	c	k		ʔ
Plosive / Affricate	voiced	b	d	d͡ʒ	ɟ	ɡ		
Fricative	voiceless	f	s	ʃ		x		h
Fricative	voiced	v	z	ʒ		ɣ	ʁ	
Approximant	median	w			j			
Approximant	lateral		l		(ʎ)			

- /ɡ/ may not show up in the Hasselt dialect, but is common in other Limburgish dialects, e.g. zègke (Dutch: zeggen) "to say".
- /n, l/ are realised as [ɲ, ʎ] before /c, ɟ/.
- /w/ is realized as [β̞] in Belgian Limburgish.
- [ɫ] is a common allophone of /l/, especially in coda position. It is rare in the Montfortian dialect.
- [ç] and [ʝ] are allophones of /x/ and /ɣ/, occurring in a front-vowel environment. This is termed Soft G in Dutch dialectology.
- [ɦ] is an allophone of /h/. In some dialects, it may be the usual realization of /h/.
- In most modern dialects, /r/ is uvular.

Overall, Limburgish dialects tend to have more consonants than Dutch. They also tend to have more vowels. According to Peter Ladefoged, the vowel inventory of the dialect of Weert is perhaps the richest in the world. It has 28 vowels, among which there are 12 long monophthongs (three of which surface as centering diphthongs), 10 short monophthongs and 6 diphthongs.

In most of the Limburgish dialects spoken to the southeast of Panningen—for example those of Roermond, Sittard and Heerlen—[ʃ] appears at the beginning of words in the consonant clusters sp, st, sl, sm, sn and zw. The same sound is realized as [s] elsewhere (e.g. sjtraot/straot, "street"). This is not the case, however, in the dialects of for example Venlo, Weert, Maastricht, Echt, Montfort and Posterholt.

=== Vowels ===
Monophthongs of the Maastrichtian dialect, from Gussenhoven & Aarts (1999:159)

Diphthongs of the Maastrichtian dialect, from Gussenhoven & Aarts (1999:159)

==== Monophthongs ====
Short vowels
	Front		Central	Back
	Unrounded	Rounded	Central	Back
Close	i	y		u
Close-mid	ɪ	ʏ	ə	ʊ
Open-mid	ɛ	œ	ə	ɔ
Open	æ			ɑ

Long vowels
	Front		Central	Back
	Unrounded	Rounded	Central	Back
Close	iː	yː		uː
Close-mid	eː	øː		oː
Open-mid	ɛː	œː œ̃ː		ɔː ɔ̃ː
Open	æː æ̃ː		aː	ɑː ɑ̃ː

- /ə/ only occurs in unstressed syllables.
- /øː œː uː/ are realised as [øə œə uə] before alveolar consonants.

=== Diphthongs ===
The diphthongs /iə ø eɪ æɪ uɪ ɔɪ aɪ ou/ occur, as well as combinations of /uː ɔː ɑː/ + /j/. /aɪ/ only occurs in French loanwords and interjections.

/ou/ is realized as [oə] before alveolar consonants. /eɪ/ can be realized as [eə] or [ejə]. In the dialect of Geleen, /eː/ is realized as [iɛ] and /oː/ as [ɔː]. In many dialects such as that of Maastricht and Sittard, the long vowel /aː/ in Dutch cognates is most of the time realized as [ɒː], as in nao ("after", "to, towards"). The Standard Dutch equivalents are na [naː] and naar [naːr].

In about 50 Belgian Limburgish dialects, the rounded front vowels /y, yː, ø, øː, œ, œː, œy/ are unrounded to /i, iː, ɪ, eː, ɛ ~ æ, ɛː, ɛi/ in most native words. They are retained in French loanwords such as dzjuus /dʒys/.

=== Tone ===
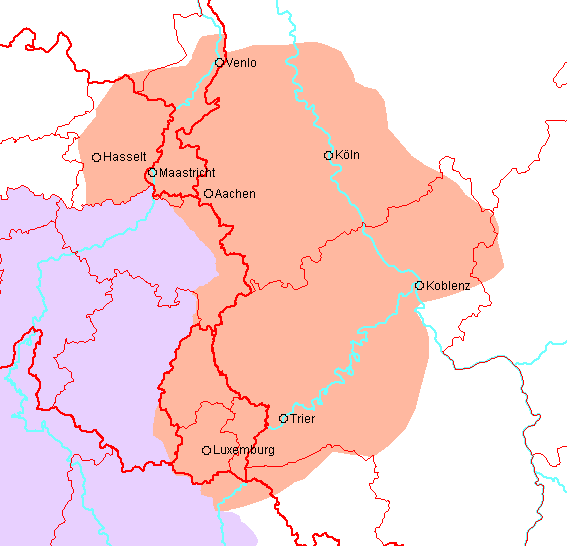
Extent (orange) of the region where a pitch accent was historically used in The Benelux, France and Germany

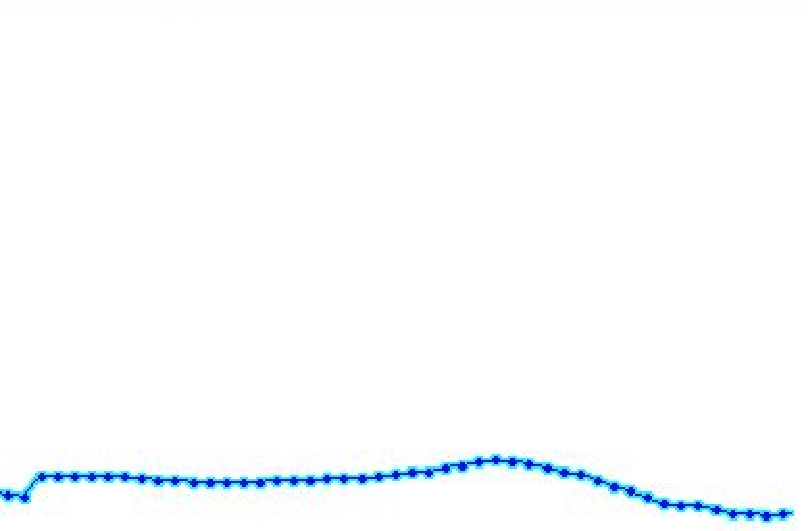
Tone contour in dragging tone

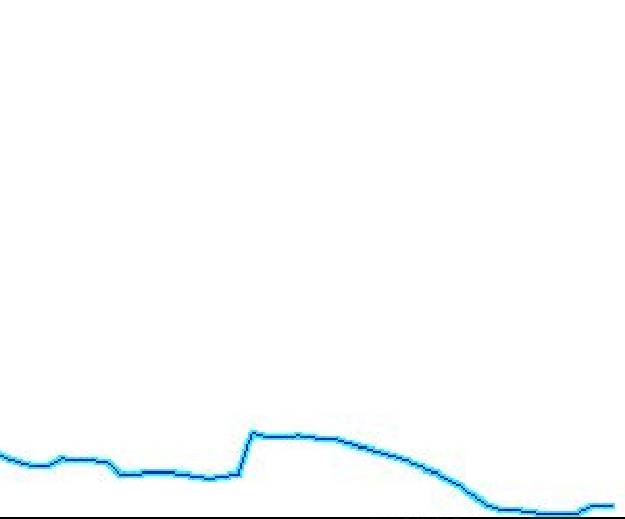
Tone contour in push tone

The pitch accent means having two different accents used in stressed syllables. The difference between these two accents is used for differentiating both various grammatical forms of a single lexeme and minimal tone pairs one from the other.

With specific regards to Limburgish, these two accents are traditionally known as sjtoettoen ("push tone") and sjleiptoen ("dragging tone"). For example, [daːx˦˨˧] daãg with a dragging tone means "day" in Limburgish, while in many Limburgish dialects [daːx˦˨] daàg with a push tone is the plural form, "days" (in addition, [daːx] can also be articulated in a neutral tone as a third possibility. In this case, it means "bye-bye" ["good day"]). In the preceding example, the difference is grammatical, but not lexical. An example of a lexical difference caused only by tone is the word [biː˦˨] biè which is articulated with a push tone and means "bee", which forms a tonal minimal pair with [biː˦˨˧] biẽ, which is articulated with a dragging tone and means "at". This contrastive pitch accent also occurs in Central Franconian dialects spoken to the southeast of Limburgish.

Other Indo-European pitch accent languages that use tone contours to distinguish the meaning of words that are otherwise phonetically identical include Lithuanian, Latvian, Swedish, Norwegian, Standard Slovene (only some speakers), Serbo-Croatian, and Punjabi. This feature is comparable to tone systems as found e.g. in Chinese or many languages of Africa and Central America, although such "classical" tone languages make much more use of tone distinctions when compared to Limburgish.

Historically, pitch accent in Limburgish and Central Franconian developed independently from accent systems in other Indo-European languages. While contrastive accent can be reconstructed for Proto Indo-European, it was completely lost in Proto-Germanic. Its reemergence in Limburgish (and Central Franconian) was phonetically triggered by vowel height, vowel length, and voicing of a following consonant, and became phonemic with sound changes that must have occurred after 1100 CE, such as lengthening of short vowels in open syllables, loss of schwa in final syllables, devoicing of consonants in final position, and merger of vowels that had been distinct before.

==== Particular local features ====
===== Bitonality =====
It has been proved by speech analysis that, in the Belgian Limburgish dialect of Borgloon, the dragging tone itself is bitonal, while it has also been proved that this is not the case in the adjacent Limburgish dialects of Tongeren and Hasselt.

===== Steeper fall =====
Other research has indicated that the push tone has a steeper fall in the eastern dialects of Limburgish (e.g. those of Venlo, Roermond and Maasbracht) than it has in western dialects. In addition, both the phonetic realisation and the syllable-based distribution of the contrasts between push and dragging tone seem to be mora-bound in the eastern dialects only. This has been examined especially by Jörg Peters.

===== Diphthongization =====
Moreover, in some dialects such as that of Sittard and Maastricht, especially the mid and high vowels tend to diphthongize when they have a push tone. So in the dialect of Sittard keize means "to choose" while in the dialect of Maasbracht no diphthongization takes place, so keze means the same here. This difference has been examined in particular by Ben Hermans and Marc van Oostendorp.

Other examples include plural

- [stæɪn˦˨˧] steĩn "stone"
- [stæɪn˦˨] steìn "stones"

and lexical

- [ɡraːf˦˨] "grave"
- [ɡraːf˦˨˧] "hole next to a road"

Verbs distinguish mood with tone:

- [weːʁ˦˨˧ˈkɪ˦˨və˧] "We conquer!"
- [weːʁ˦˨˧ˈkɪ˦˨˧və˧] "May we conquer!"

The difference between push tone and dragging tone may also purely mark grammatical declension without there being any difference in meaning, as in the dialect of Borgloon: gieël ("yellow", with dragging tone) as opposed to en gieël peer ("a yellow pear", with push tone). This tonal shift also occurs when the adjective gets an inflectional ending, as in nen gieëlen appel ("a yellow apple").

In some parts of Limburg, the tonal plural is being replaced with the Dutch forms among the younger generation, so that the plural for daag becomes dage ([daːʝə]).

=== Samples ===
The sample texts are readings of the first sentence of The North Wind and the Sun.

==== Phonetic transcription (Hasselt, West Limburgish) ====
[də ˈnɔːʀdəʀˌβɛntʃ˨ ən də ˈzɔn | βøːʀən ɑn dɪskəˈtɛːʀə | ˈeː˨vəʀ ˈβiə vɔn ɪn ˈtβɛː ət ˈstæʀ˨əkstə βøːʀ || ˈtuːn ˈkum təʀ ˈdʒys ˈei˨mɑnt vʀ̩ˈbɛː˨ | ˈdiː nən ˈdɪkə ˈβæʀmə ˈjɑs ˈɑːn˨ɦaː]

==== Orthographic version (Hasselt, West Limburgish) ====
De naorderwèndj en de zon weuren an disketaere ever wieë von hin twae het sterrekste weur, toên koem ter dzjuus eejmand verbae diê nen dikke, werme jas àànhaa.

==== Phonetic transcription (Maastricht, Central Limburgish) ====
[də ˈnoːʀ˦dəˌβɪnt˦ æn də ˈzɔn ɦɑdən ən ˈdʀœkə dɪsˈkʏsi ˈøː˦vəʀ də ˈvʀɒːx | ˈβeː vaːn ɦynən ˈtβijə də ˈstæʀ˦kstə βɒːʀ | tun ˈʒys iːmɑnt vøːʀˈbɛː˦ kɒːm | deː nən ˈdɪkə ˈβæʀmə ˈjɑs ˈɒːnɦɑt]

==== Orthographic version (Maastricht, Central Limburgish) ====
De noordewind en de zon hadde en drökke discussie euver de vraog wee vaan hunen twieje de sterkste waor, toen zjuus iemand veurbij kaom dee nen dikke, werme jas aonhad.

== Grammar ==
=== Nouns ===
==== Gender ====
Limburgish has three grammatical genders. In some of the Limburgish dialects, den is used before masculine words beginning with b, d, h, t or with a vowel and in many other dialects der is used before all masculine words. In most dialects, the indefinite article is eine(n) for masculine nouns, ein for feminine nouns and ei or 'n for neuter nouns. Without stress, these forms are most of the time realized as ne(n), n and e.

==== Plural ====
For some nouns, Limburgish uses simulfixes (i.e. umlaut) to form the plural:

- broor – breur (brother – brothers)
- sjoon – sjeun (shoe – shoes): note this can also be 'sjoon' with sjtoettoen (pushing tone).

For some nouns, there exists a separate conjugation as well:

- thoos - turrest - tezennest / tehurrest - tozzest - toerrest - tehunnest (my home - your home - his home / her home - our home - their home)

Plural and diminutive nouns based on Umlaut start to prevail east towards Germany. However, towards the west, the phonemic distinction between dragging and pushing tone will stop just before Riemst.

==== Diminutives ====
The diminutive suffix is most often -ke, as in Brabantian, or -je/-sje after a dental consonant. For some nouns an umlaut is also used and in breurke for 'little brother' and sjeunke for 'little shoe'.

=== Adjectives ===
According to their declension, Limburgish adjectives can be grouped into two classes. Adjectives of the first class get the ending -e in their masculine and feminine singular forms and always in plural, but no ending in their neuter singular form. When combined with a masculine noun in singular adjectives may also end on -en, under the same phonological conditions which apply to articles. To this class belong most adjectives ending on a -ch[t], -d, -k, -p, -t or -s preceded by another consonant or with one of the suffixes -eg, -ig and -isch. The other declension class includes most adjectives ending on -f, -g, -j, -l,-m,-n, -ng, -r, -w or -s preceded by a vowel; these adjectives only get the ending -e(n) in their masculine singular form.

When used as a predicate, Limburgish adjectives never get an ending: Dee mins is gek (Maastrichtian: "That person is crazy"). Except when following the neutre pronoun where they sometimes get -t: 't Eint of 't angert ("one or the other", compare Dutch het ene of het andere), though this is dying out.

=== Pronouns ===
==== Personal pronouns ====
	Subject				Object			
	Venlo	Roermond	Weert	Maastricht	Venlo	Roermond	Weert	Maastricht
First person singular	ik	ich		iech	mich			miech
Second person singular	doe		dich	diech	dich			diech
Third person singular masculine	heej	heer	hae	heer	häöm	häöm, dem	heum	häöm
Third person singular feminine	zie, het		zeuj	zie, zij	häör, häöm		heur	häör
Third person singular neutral	het				het			
First person plural	weej	veer	vae	veer	ós			us
Second person plural	geej	geer	gae	geer	óch		uch	uuch
Third person plural	zie		zeuj	die	häör		hun	

==== Possessive pronouns ====
	Singular masculine	Singular feminine	Singular neuter	Plural
First person singular	miene(n)	mien	mie	mien
Second person singular	diene(n)	dien	die	dien
Third person singular masculine	ziene(n)	zien	zie	zien
Third person singular neutral	ziene(n)	zien	zie	zien
Third person singular feminine	häöre(n)	häör	häör	häör
First person plural	ooze(n)	oos (Maastrichtian: eus)	ós (Maastrichtian: us)	oos (Maastrichtian: eus)
Second person plural	eure(n)	eur	eur	eur
Third person plural	häöre(n) (easterly) / hunne(n) (westerly)	häör (easterly) / hun (westerly)	häör (easterly) / hun (westerly)	häör (easterly) / hun (westerly)

In the masculine singular forms of mien, dien, zien and oos, final -n is added under the same phonological conditions which apply to articles and adjectives. Deletion of the final -n in the neuter forms of mien, dien, zien no longer occurs in the dialect of Venlo and is also disappearing in the dialect of Roermond.

==== Demonstrative pronouns ====
The most common demonstrative pronouns in Limburgish are:

Singular masculine	Singular feminine	Singular neuter	Plural	Translation
deze(n)/dizze(n)	dees/dis	dit	dees	this/these
dae(n) (Maastrichtian: dee)	die	det (Venlo, Roermond, Weert), dat (Maastricht)	die	that/those

== Vocabulary ==
The greater part of the vocabulary of the Limburgish dialects represents continuations from Old, Middle, and Modern Dutch, but Limburgish, depending on the specific variety, also displays strong influences from German and/or French.

The Limburgish dialects, particularly those spoken on the left bank of the Rhine, also preserve a relatively large number of old Latin loanwords. The area around Sint-Truiden in Belgian Limburg has retained the highest concentration of Latin and Old Romance loanwords.

In Belgian Limburg and Maastricht, French was spoken by the upper bourgeoisie until well into the twentieth century. In the extreme southeast, along the German border (Heerlen and Kerkrade), Standard German was, for a time, better known than Standard Dutch. With the spread of Standard Dutch through education, many Limburgish words of French or German origin were replaced during the twentieth century by Dutch equivalents. Thus, the characteristically Maastricht terms brazzelèt (“bracelet”) and hospitaol (“hospital”) have been supplanted by ermband and ziekenhoes, while the Roermond word balt (“soon”) has given way to gaw. Conversely, the use of the reflexive pronoun zich was found in a 1994 study to be on the increase.

Limburgish dialect dictionaries often exhibit a discrepancy between the forms recorded and the actual spoken language, since many compilers believe that the dialects of the two Limburgs are rapidly deteriorating under the influence of Standard Dutch. This perspective, frequently expressed in the introductions to such dictionaries, has led to a vocabulary selection that is more closely associated with the speech of older generations.

Vocabulary examples of different Limburgish dialects
Dialect		Meaning	Notes
Sittard-dialect	fixeiere	to fasten, to fix	From French fixer (to fasten, to fix)
	fizzelrae(n)ge	drizzle	Compare German Fisselregen (drizzle)
Maastricht-dialect	keend (sg.), kinder (pl.)	child, children	
	aomzeik	ant	Compare German Ameise and the Aachen-dialect Omeseeck (both meaning "ant")
	klasjenere	to talk, to discuss	From Ripuarian klatschen (to talk), compare German klatschen (to gossip)
Venlo-dialect	dalles	poverty	From Yiddish; dalles, from Hebrew dallūþ (poverty)
	briek	brick	From French brique (brick), compare Middle Dutch bricke (brick, tile)
	intelik	finally	

== See also ==
- Limburgish Wikipedia
- Southeast Limburgish

== Sources ==
- Bakkes, Pierre (2007). Mofers Waordebook. Stichting Mofers Waordebook. ISBN 978-90-9022294-3.
- Belemans, Rob; Keulen, Ronny (2004). Belgisch-Limburgs (in Dutch). Lannoo Uitgeverij. ISBN 978-90-209-5855-3.
- Driessen, Geert (2012): Ontwikkelingen in het gebruik van Fries, streektalen en dialecten in de periode 1995-2011. Nijmegen: ITS.
- Frins, Jean (2005): Syntaktische Besonderheiten im Aachener Dreilãndereck. Eine Übersicht begleitet von einer Analyse aus politisch-gesellschaftlicher Sicht. Groningen: RUG Repro [Undergraduate Thesis, Groningen University] (in German)
- Frins, Jean (2006): Karolingisch-Fränkisch. Die plattdůtsche Volkssprache im Aachener Dreiländereck. Groningen: RUG Repro [Master's Thesis, Groningen University] (in German)
- Grootaers, L.; Grauls, J. (1930). Klankleer van het Hasselt dialect (in Dutch). Leuven: de Vlaamsche Drukkerij.
- Gussenhoven, Carlos; Aarts, Flor (1999). "The dialect of Maastricht" (PDF). Journal of the International Phonetic Association. 29 (2). University of Nijmegen, Centre for Language Studies: 155–166. doi:10.1017/S0025100300006526. S2CID 145782045. Archived from the original (PDF) on 2017-10-11.
  - "Alternate text" (PDF). Archived from the original (PDF) on 2011-06-12.
- Gussenhoven, C.; van der Vliet, P. (1999). "The phonology of tone and intonation in the Dutch dialect of Venlo". Journal of Linguistics. 35: 99–135. doi:10.1017/S0022226798007324. S2CID 18527758.
- Peters, Jörg (2006). "The dialect of Hasselt". Journal of the International Phonetic Association. 36 (1): 117–124. doi:10.1017/S0025100306002428.
- Staelens, X. (1989). Dieksjneèèr van 't (H)essels. Nederlands-Hasselts Woordenboek (in Dutch). Hasselt: de Langeman.
