= West Central German =

Variety of Central German

- Westmitteldeutsch
- Geographic distribution: Rhineland-Palatinate, Saarland, Hesse, North Rhine-Westphalia, German-speaking Community of Belgium, Lorraine, Deitscherei
- Linguistic classification: Indo-European: Germanic; West Germanic; Elbe Germanic; High German; Central German; West Central German
- Subdivisions: Central Franconian; Rhine Franconian

Language codes
- Glottolog: high1287
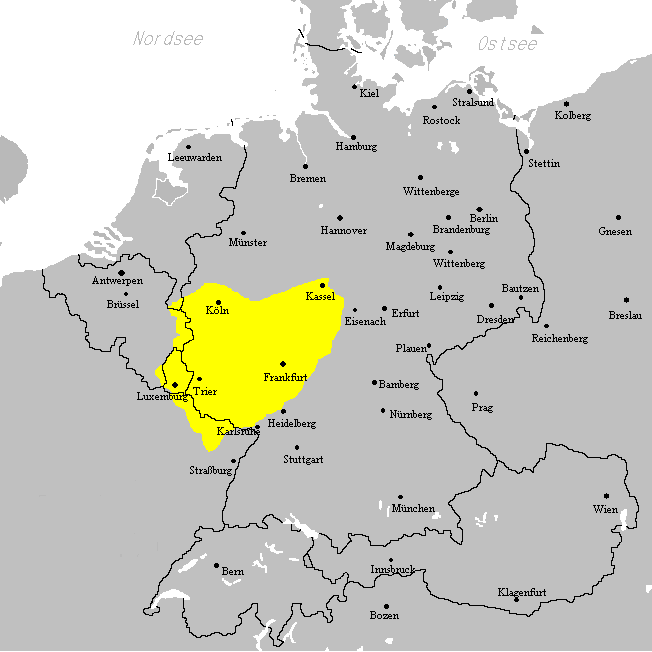
- West Central German–language area

West Central German (German: Westmitteldeutsch) belongs to the Central, High German dialect family of German. It includes the following sub-families:

- Central Franconian (Mittelfränkisch)
  - Ripuarian (Ripuarisch), spoken in North Rhine-Westphalia (including Kölsch) and German-speaking Belgium and a small edge of the south of the Dutch province of Limbourg.
  - Moselle Franconian (Moselfränkisch; French: francique luxembourgeois) in Rhineland-Palatinate, Saarland and France
    - Luxembourgish (Luxemburgisch; Luxembourgish: Lëtzebuergesch; francique luxembourgeois or luxembourgeois) in Luxembourg, Belgium and France
    - Hunsrik (Riograndenser Hunsrückisch), spoken in Brazil and derived from the Hunsrückisch dialect of Moselle Franconian
- Rhine Franconian (Rheinfränkisch; francique rhénan)
  - Palatinate Franconian (Pfälzisch; francique palatin), spoken in Rhineland-Palatinate
    - Lorraine Franconian (Lothringisch; francique lorrain) in the French region of Lorraine
    - Bukovina German (Bukowinadeutsch) in Bukovina (extinct)
    - Pennsylvania German (Pennsylvaniadeutsch) in historical communities in North America, especially Pennsylvania
  - Hessian (Hessisch) in Hesse and the Rhenish Hesse region of Rhineland-Palatinate
    - North Hessian (Nordhessisch)
    - Central Hessian (Mittelhessisch)
    - East Hessian (Osthessisch)
    - South Hessian (Südhessisch)

On the southern and southeastern edges, West Central German varieties border on an area often considered a transitional area between Central German and Upper German, comprising the dialect groups South Franconian German and East Franconian German (popularly called Franconian because dialects of this sub-family are spoken all over Franconia).

West Central German was spoken in several settlements throughout America, for example in the Amana Colonies.

== See also ==
- East Central German
- Limburgish language
- High German consonant shift
