= Central Franconian languages =

Group of West Central German dialects

Central Franconian
- Middle Franconian (Mittelfränkisch)
- Geographic distribution: North Rhine-Westphalia, Rhineland-Palatinate, Saarland, Lorraine, Luxembourg, Liège, Limburg, Transylvania
- Linguistic classification: Indo-European: Germanic; West Germanic; Weser-Rhine Germanic; Central German; West Central German; Central Franconian

Language codes
- Glottolog: midd1319
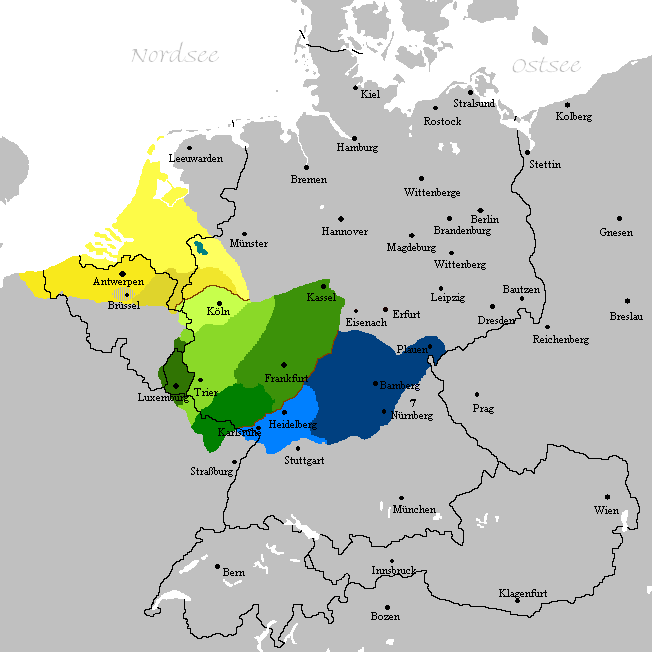
- Central Franconian among the Franconian languages. Ripuarian Moselle Franconian Luxembourgish

Central or Middle Franconian (German: mittelfränkische Dialekte, mittelfränkische Mundarten, mittelfränkische Mundart, Mittelfränkisch) refers to the following continuum of West Central German dialects:

- Ripuarian (spoken in the German state of North Rhine-Westphalia, in eastern Belgium, and the southeastern tip of Dutch Limburg)
- Moselle Franconian (in German Rhineland-Palatinate and Saarland, in eastern Belgium and French Lorraine)
  - Luxembourgish (in Luxembourg and the adjacent areas of Belgium and France)

Luxembourgish is often included within Moselle Franconian, but sometimes regarded as a separate group. The German-speaking Community of Belgium comprises both Ripuarian and Moselle Franconian dialects. The Central Franconian dialects are part of a continuum stretching from the Low Franconian language area in the northwest to the Rhine Franconian dialects in the southeast. Along with Limburgish, Central Franconian has a simple tone system called pitch accent.

The Central Franconian language area is not to be confused with the Bavarian administrative district of Middle Franconia, where East Franconian dialects are spoken.

== Phonology ==
=== Tonal distinctions ===
The Central Franconian dialects are of particular interest to linguists because of the tonal distinctions made between different words, for example (Ripuarian) zɛɪ (tonal accent 1) "sieve" vs. zɛɪ (tonal accent 2) "she". See Pitch-accent language.

=== Word-final /n/ deletion ===
Word-final /n/ deletion (WFnD) is a widespread phonological phenomenon attested, in addition to various dialects of Dutch and German, in a number of other languages, including Cypriot Greek and English. Within the typology of phonological rules, WFnD occurs in Central Franconian (CF) in several distinct forms. In Moselle Franconian, the southern subgroup of Central Franconian, WFnD operates as an allophonic process: the final nasal is realized obligatorily before a word beginning with a vowel or with /d, t, ts, n, h/, and is by obligation deleted in all other environments (e.g., [ʃʀɑɪvən diːɐ] schreiwen dir 'writing to you' versus [ʃʀɑɪvə baːl] 'writing soon'). In the dialects of Ripuarian and in the dialects of the Ripuarian–East Limburgish transition zone, which constitute the northern subgroup of Central Franconian, WFnD is here instead either lexicalized or variable. As a process which is lexicalized, it reflects diachronic developments found in most post-schwa environments, in a number of monosyllabic environments, and in some environments following a long vowel (e.g., /maːkə/, standard Dutch /maːkə(n)/ 'to make'; /aː/ vs. st. Dutch /aːn/ 'on'; /eː/ vs. st. Dutch /eːn/ 'one'). As a variable process, WFnD applies inconsistently in a set of monosyllabic function words following a short vowel (e.g., /vɑ(n)/, st. Dutch /vɑn/ 'of'; /ɪ(n)/, st. Dutch /ɪn/ 'in, into').
