= Rhine Franconian dialects =

Dialect chain of West Central German

Rhenish Franconian
- Rhenish-Franconian, Rhine Franconian, Rhine-Franconian
- Geographic distribution: Rhineland-Palatinate, Saarland, Hesse, Lorraine, Alsace
- Linguistic classification: Indo-European: Germanic; West Germanic; Weser-Rhine Germanic; Central German; West Central German; Rhenish Franconian

Language codes
- Glottolog: rhin1244
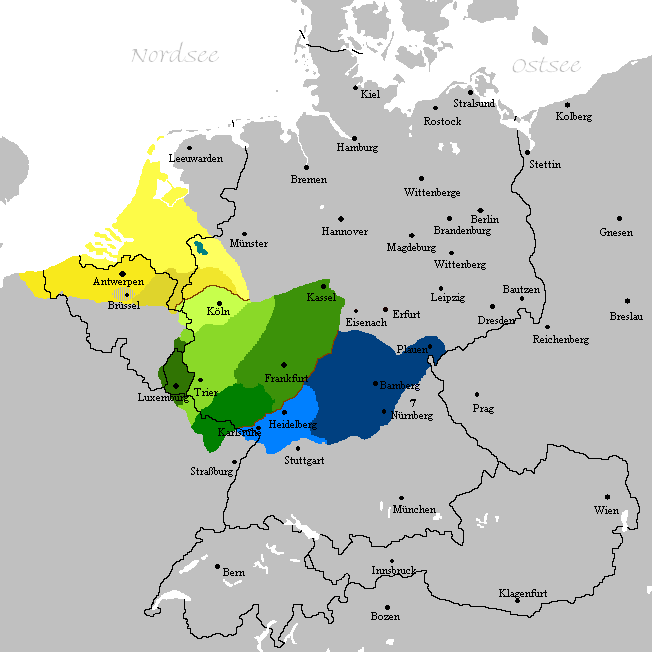
- Rhenish Franconian among the Franconian languages. Hessian Palatine German & Lorraine Franconian

- East Franconian is classified as Vulnerable by the UNESCO Atlas of the World's Languages in Danger

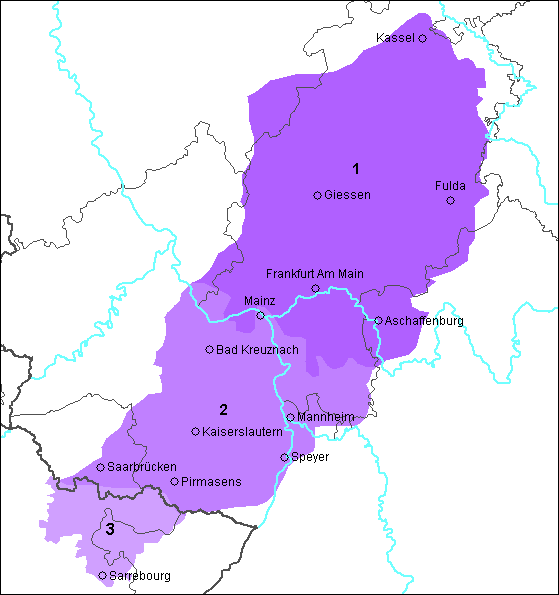
Area where Rhine Franconian is spoken. 1 Hessian, 2 Palatinate German 3 Lorraine Franconian

Rhenish Franconian or Rhine Franconian (German: Rheinfränkisch [ˈʁaɪnfʁɛŋkɪʃ]) is a dialect chain of West Central German. It comprises the varieties of German spoken across the western regions of the states of Saarland, Rhineland-Palatinate, northwest Baden-Württemberg, and Hesse in Germany. It is also spoken in northeast France, in the eastern part of the département of Moselle in the Lorraine region, and in the north-west part of Bas-Rhin in Alsace. To the north, it is bounded by the Sankt Goar line (or das–dat line) which separates it from Moselle Franconian; to the south, it is bounded by the Main line which is also referred to as the Speyer line which separates it from the Upper German dialects.

== Subgroups ==
- Hessisch or Hessian
- Pfälzisch-Lothringisch
  - Pfälzisch or Palatine German
  - Lothringisch or Lorraine Franconian

== See also ==
- Saarland (section Local dialect)
- Moselle Franconian (adjacent language area)

== Bibliography ==
- Hughes, Stephanie. 2005. Bilingualism in North-East France with specific reference to Rhenish Franconian spoken by Moselle Cross-border (or frontier) workers. In Preisler, Bent, et al., eds. The Consequences of Mobility: Linguistic and Sociocultural Contact Zones. Roskilde, Denmark: Roskilde Universitetscenter: Institut for Sprog og Kultur. ISBN 87-7349-651-0.
