= Moselle Franconian language =

West Central German language

Moselle Franconian
- Native to: Germany, France, Luxembourg, Belgium, Romania, Brazil
- Region: North Rhine-Westphalia, Rhineland-Palatinate, Saarland, Lorraine, Liège
- Language family: Indo-European: Germanic; West Germanic; Weser-Rhine Germanic; (High German); Central German; West Central German; Central Franconian; Moselle Franconian
- Early forms: Proto-Indo-European: Proto-Germanic; Frankish; Old High Franconian; Old Central Franconian
- Standard forms: Luxembourgish

Official status
- Official language in: Luxembourg
- Recognised minority language in: French Community of Belgium; Brazil (recognised as Cultural Heritage in the states of Santa Catarina and Rio Grande do Sul)

Language codes
- ISO 639-3: None (mis); Individual codes: ltz – Luxembourgish hrx – Hunsrik
- Glottolog: luxe1241
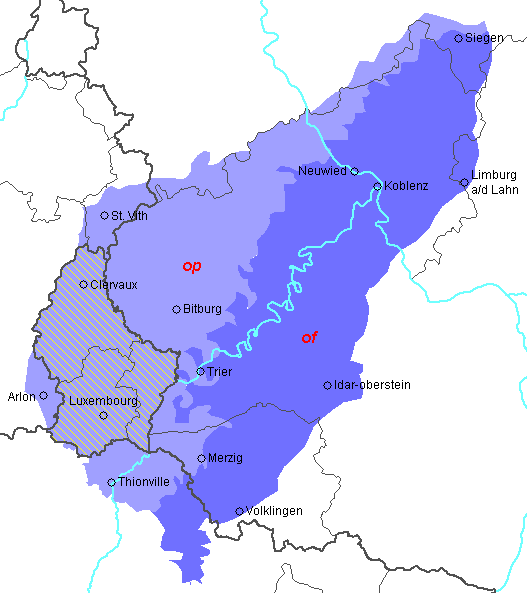
- Area where Moselle Franconian / Luxembourgish is spoken with the isogloss between usage of op and of (Standard German: auf) shown

- Moselle Franconian is classified as Vulnerable by the UNESCO Atlas of the World's Languages in Danger

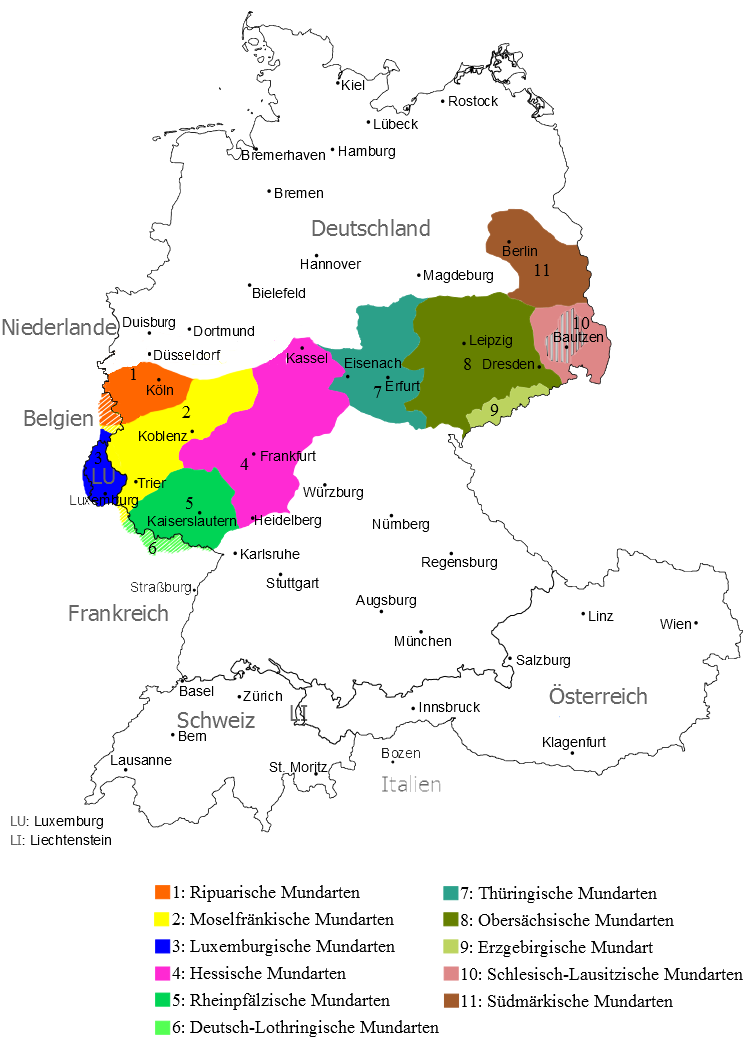
Central German language area after 1945 and the expulsions of the Germans. Moselle Franconian is shown in yellow (Germany) and blue (Luxembourg)

Moselle Franconian (German: Moselfränkisch; Luxembourgish: Muselfränkesch) is a West Central German dialect, part of the Central Franconian languages area, that includes Luxembourgish, although it is seen as a separate language apart from German.

== Overview ==
Moselle Franconian is spoken in the southern Rhineland and along the course of the Moselle, in the Siegerland of North Rhine-Westphalia, throughout western Rhineland-Palatinate and Saarland, Luxembourg, the south of the German-speaking Community of Belgium and in the neighboring French département of Moselle (in Arrondissement of Boulay-Moselle). The Transylvanian Saxon dialect spoken in the Transylvania region of Romania is derived from this dialect as a result of the emigration of numerous "Transylvanian Saxons" between 1100 and 1300, primarily from areas in which the Moselle Franconian dialect was then spoken. Another variety of Moselle Franconian, the Hunsrik, is spoken in some rural areas of southern Brazil, brought by 19th century immigrants from the Hunsrück region in modern Germany.

== Varieties ==
The transition between "dialect" and "separate language" is fluid.

The Linguasphere Register lists five dialects of Moselle Franconian (code 52-ACB-dc) with codes -dca to -dce:

- Trierisch (Rhineland-Palatinate, Luxembourg, northwestern Saarland)
- Eifelisch (Rhineland-Palatinate, East Belgium, Luxembourg, southern North Rhine-Westphalia)
- Untermosellanisch (Rhineland-Palatinate)
- West-Westerwäldisch (Rhineland-Palatinate)
- Siegerländisch (southern North Rhine-Westphalia, northeastern Rhineland-Palatinate)

Also considered part of the Moselle Franconian language are the variants of Lorraine Franconian, Luxembourgish and Transylvanian Saxon dialect.

Some Moselle Franconian dialects have developed into standardized varieties which can be considered separate languages, especially due to the limited intelligibility of some dialects for Standard German speakers:

- Luxembourgish (Lëtzebuergesch)
- Lorraine Franconian
- Transylvanian Saxon dialect
- Hunsrik

Most speakers of Luxembourgish are multilingual, speaking Standard German and French in addition to Luxembourgish.

== See also ==
- Saarland (section Local dialect)
- Rhine Franconian (related neighboring dialect group)
- Meuse-Rhenish
