= Siegerländisch =

German Dialect

Siegerländisch (German: Siegerländisch, locally called Sejerlännr Pladd) is the northeasternmost dialect of the Moselle Franconian Dialect Group. Siegerländisch is spoken in the region around the city of Siegen in Germany. The dialect is also spoken in parts of northern Altenkirchen as well as parts of the Westerwaldkreis. It has strong lexical similarities to the Hessian dialects and to South Westphalian, which are spoken in surrounding regions. It belongs to the West Central German branch of the High German languages. It is bounded on the north by the Benrath line, which separates it from the Westphalian language and thus from Low German, as well as on the east by the Sankt Goar line and on the west by the Eifel and the Ripuarian language.

== Phonological Features ==
The dialect features speaking patterns such as saying dat and wat rather than das and was respectively. This dialect's realisation of the German /r/ phoneme, unlike those of most German dialects, sounds similar to the North American /r/ sound, as it is an approximant articulated with the tip of the tongue.

=== Position within the High German Consonant Shift ===
Siegerländisch has only partially undergone the High German consonant shift.

p → pf - This sound change has not occurred in Siegerländisch. See Standard German Pferd, Topf, and Apfel, which are respectively rendered in Siegerländisch as Päärd, Döbbe, and Abbel.

p → f - This sound change has at least partially occurred in most varieties of Siegerländisch. It can be seen in schlafen, rendered as schloafe, but in the northern Altkreis, Standard German auf is often rendered as op.

t → s - Not entirely complete; 'small' words like das, was, and es consistently retain /t/ in Siegerländisch (hence dat, wat, and et).

t → z - Siegerländisch seems to have fully adopted this sound change. In Siegen, one hears Zitt and zwo for Standard German Zeit and zwei.

tt → tz - Siegerländisch is partially affected by this sound change. Standard German Katze is rendered identically in Siegerländisch, but /tt/ does occasionally occur.

k → ch - As in Standard German, this only occurs intervocalically and in word-final position.

d → t - In Siegerländisch, the voiceless alveolar stop is generally unaspirated, so the distinction between the /t/ and /d/ phonemes is less noticeable.

v/w/f → b - This sound change has occurred in a few words; for example, Standard German Weib is rendered as Wibsmensch. However, most words retain Low German pronunciations of these consonants. For example, Standard German lieber and Trauben are called leewer and Wingtruweln in Siegerländisch, and the imperative Bleib noch hier! is rendered as Bliff noch hee!

=== Rhotic Consonant ===
The Siegerländisch rhotic consonant (/r/ sound) is perhaps the most noticeable phonological feature of the dialect. It is a coronal approximant, occasionally postalveolar but typically retroflex.

=== Voiceless Plosives ===
In contrast with most German dialects, voiceless plosives in Siegerländisch are generally not aspirated. It is thus difficult and occasionally impossible for native speakers to distinguish them from voiced plosives when they directly precede vowels. Only /k/ occasionally retains its aspiration in word-initial position.

=== Lenition of /g/ ===
The consonant /g/ is typically rendered as /x/ ⟨ch⟩ in syllable-final position. For example, Standard German Berg is rendered as Berch.

=== Elision of /n/ ===
The consonant /n/ is often lost in word-final position.

== Examples ==
=== Pronouns ===
I - ich - ech
He - er - hä
She - sie - er/dat
We - wir - mir/mer

=== Time ===
Today - heute - ho
Tomorrow - morgen - morn
Morning - der Morgen - dr Morje

=== Days of the Week ===
Monday - Montag - Månéch
Tuesday - Dienstag - Dersdéch
Wednesday - Mittwoch – Méddwoch/Middwuch
Thursday - Donnerstag - Donnrschdéch
Friday - Freitag - Frijdaach
Saturday - Samstag - Samsdach
Sunday - Sonntag - Sonnéch

=== People ===
Girl - Mädchen – Mäddche
Boy - Junge – Jong
Unraised Child, Brat - ungezogenes Kind, Blag – Bloach, Boachd, Oodochd, Schinnoss (weibl.), Rotzbloach
Dad - Papa - Babbe
Mom - Mama - Mamme
Grandmother - Oma - Omma

== See also ==
- Moselle Franconian
