= Uerdingen line =

Isogloss in German dialectology

Map showing the Uerdingen line

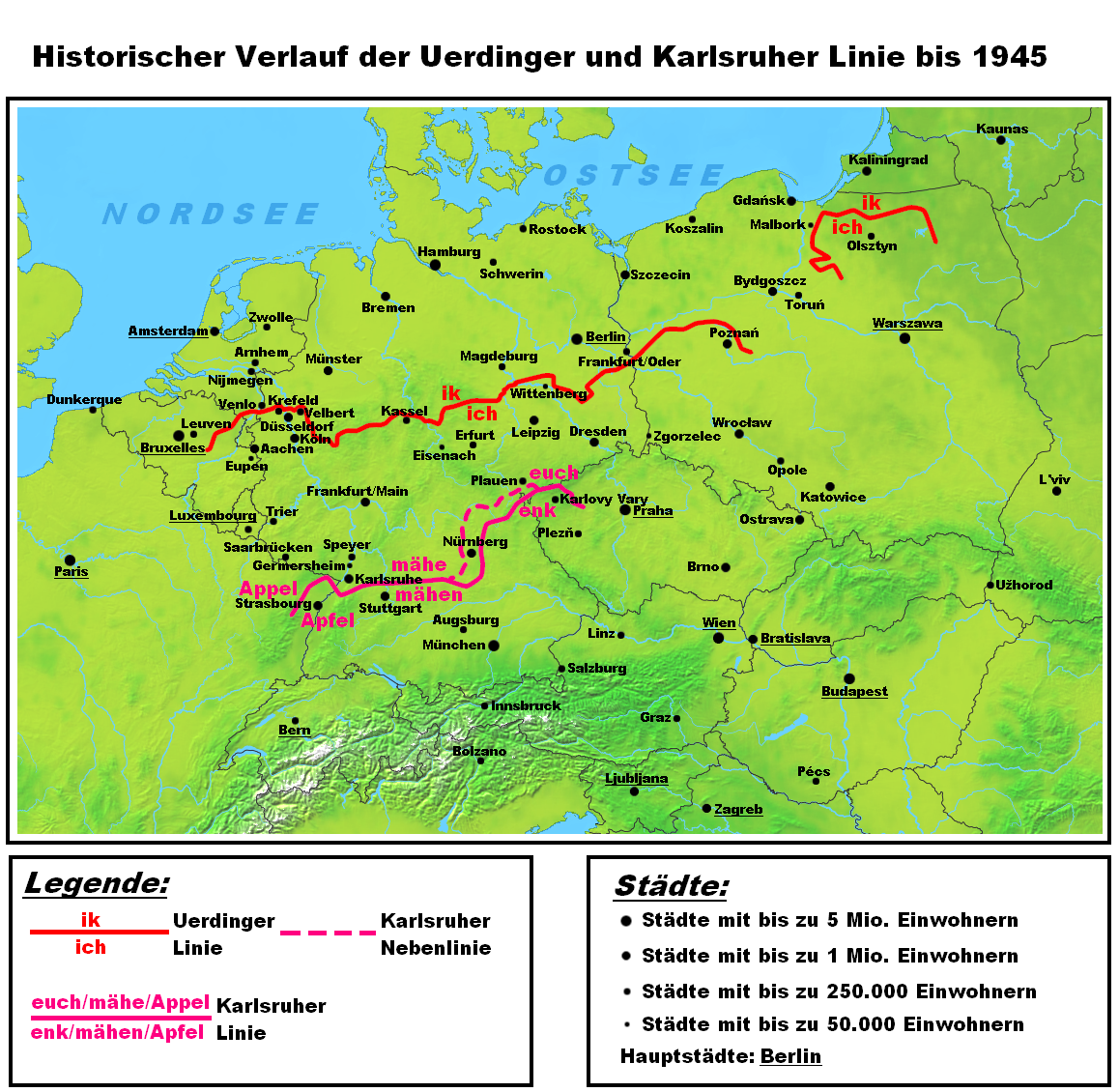
The Uerdingen and the Karlsruhe line. The Karlsruhe line divides the Upper German dialects and the High Franconian dialects.

The Uerdingen Line (German: Ürdinger Linie, Uerdinger Linie, Dutch: Uerdinger linie; named after Uerdingen by Georg Wenker) is the isogloss within West Germanic languages that separates dialects which preserve the -k sound in the first person singular pronoun word "ik" (north of the line) from dialects where the word-final -k has changed to word final -ch in the word "ich" (IPA [ç]) (south of the line). This sound shift is the one that progressed the furthest north among the consonant shifts which characterize High German and Middle German dialects. The line passes through Belgium, the Netherlands, and Germany.

North of the line Low German and Dutch are spoken. South of the line Central German is spoken. In the area between the Uerdingen line and the Benrath line to its south, which includes parts of Belgium and the Netherlands, the Germanic dialect Limburgish is spoken. In eastern Germany, the regional languages have been largely replaced by standard German since the 20th century.

The western end of the Uerdingen line is at Bierbeek, southwest of Leuven, Flemish Brabant, Belgium. From there, it runs in northeastern direction, north of Hasselt and Weert, Netherlands, and then goes straight east. It passes south of Venlo to cross into Germany's Rhineland. It passes through Kempen and Krefeld-Hüls, and crosses the Rhine between Krefeld-Uerdingen and Duisburg-Mündelheim. From there, the isogloss passes south of Mülheim an der Ruhr-Saarn, and Essen-Kettwig, where it turns southeast. It continues past Wuppertal-Elberfeld, Gummersbach and Bergneustadt. Further east, it forms the border of the Sauerland (to its north) and the Siegerland (to its south). It passes north of Kassel, south of Magdeburg and north of Wittenberg. In southern Brandenburg in eastern Germany, the isogloss runs by Halbe, Hermsdorf, Freidorf and Staakow.

== See also ==
- High German consonant shift
- Benrath line
- Speyer line
- Weißwurstäquator
- Joret line
- Sankt Goar line
