= Weißwurstäquator =

Supposed cultural boundary between South and North Germany

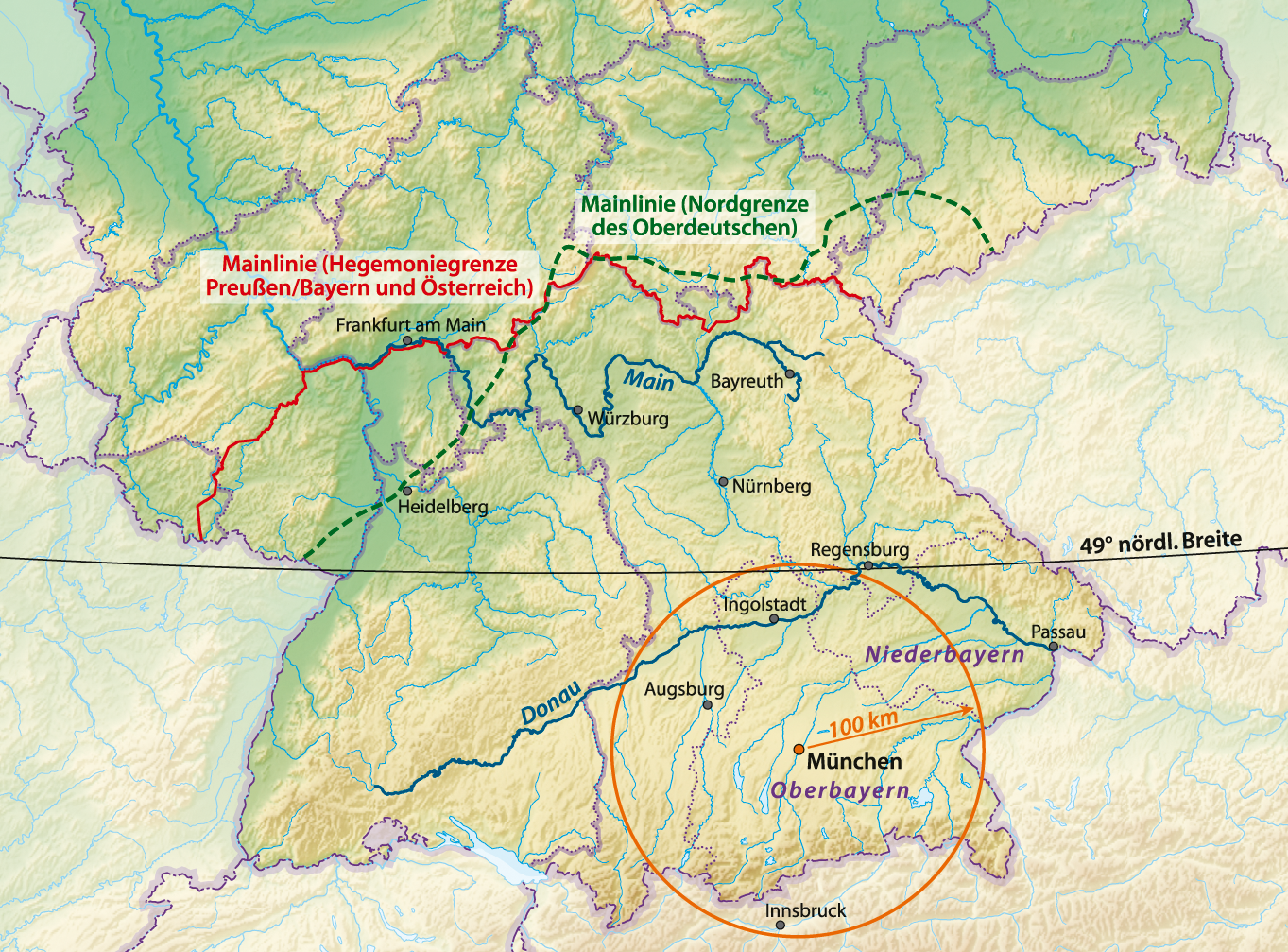
The various definitions of the Weißwurstäquator: 1) The Speyer line (green), 2) the river Main line as the frontier of Prussian hegemony before 1871 (red), 3) the 49° latitude (black).

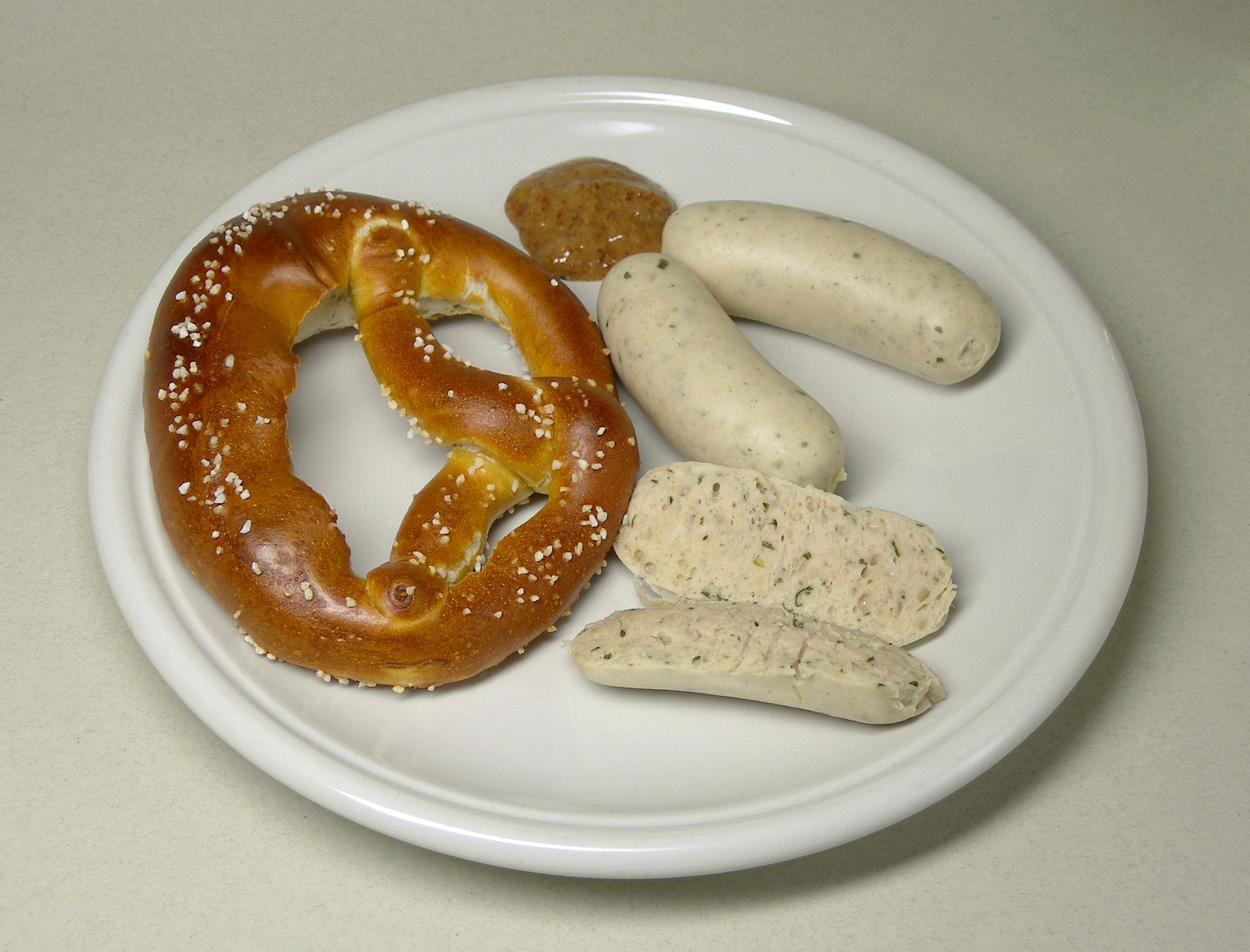
Weißwürste mit Brezn und süßem Senf (white sausages with pretzel and sweet mustard)

"Weißwurstäquator" (German pronunciation: [ˈvaɪsvʊʁst.ɛˌkvaːtoːɐ̯]; lit. 'white sausage equator') is a humorous term describing the supposed cultural boundary separating Southern Germany from the northern parts, especially Bavaria from Central Germany.

It is named for the Weißwurst sausage of Bavaria, and has no precise definition. A popular one is the linguistic boundary known as the Speyer line separating Upper German from Central German dialects, roughly following the Main River; another is a line running further south, more or less along the Danube, or between the Main and the Danube, roughly along the 49th parallel north circle of latitude.

== See also ==
- Röstigraben
- Barassi Line
