= Middle German Chemical Triangle =

Coordinates: 51.3900°N 12.1800°E

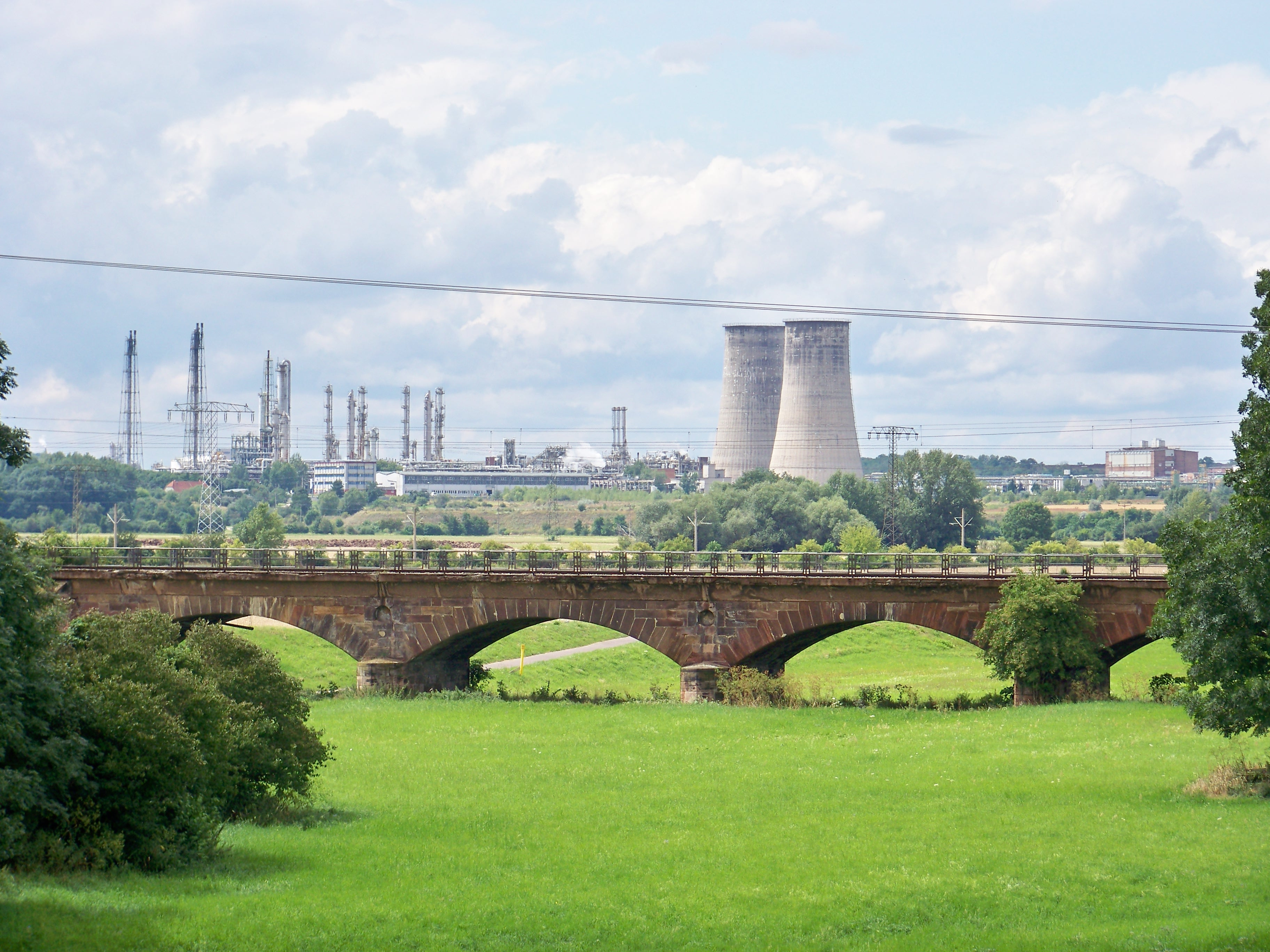
Leuna industrial complex

The Central German Chemical Triangle (German: Mitteldeutsches Chemiedreieck or locally just Chemiedreieck) is the industrial conurbation around the cities and towns of Halle (Saale), Merseburg and Bitterfeld in the North German state of Saxony-Anhalt and Leipzig and Schkeuditz in the Free State of Saxony. Its name is derived from the dominant industries of the region – the chemical and oil refining industries.

It is often referred to as the Leuna-Buna-Bitterfeld Chemical Triangle (Chemiedreieck Leuna-Buna-Bitterfeld) because these places are the oldest and most important in the region. Buna is not a town, but was the name of the first synthetic rubber (butadiene and natrium) which was produced in the Buna factory at Schkopau. Today Dow Chemical produces synthetic rubber in Schkopau which is marketed under the name of BUNA SB.

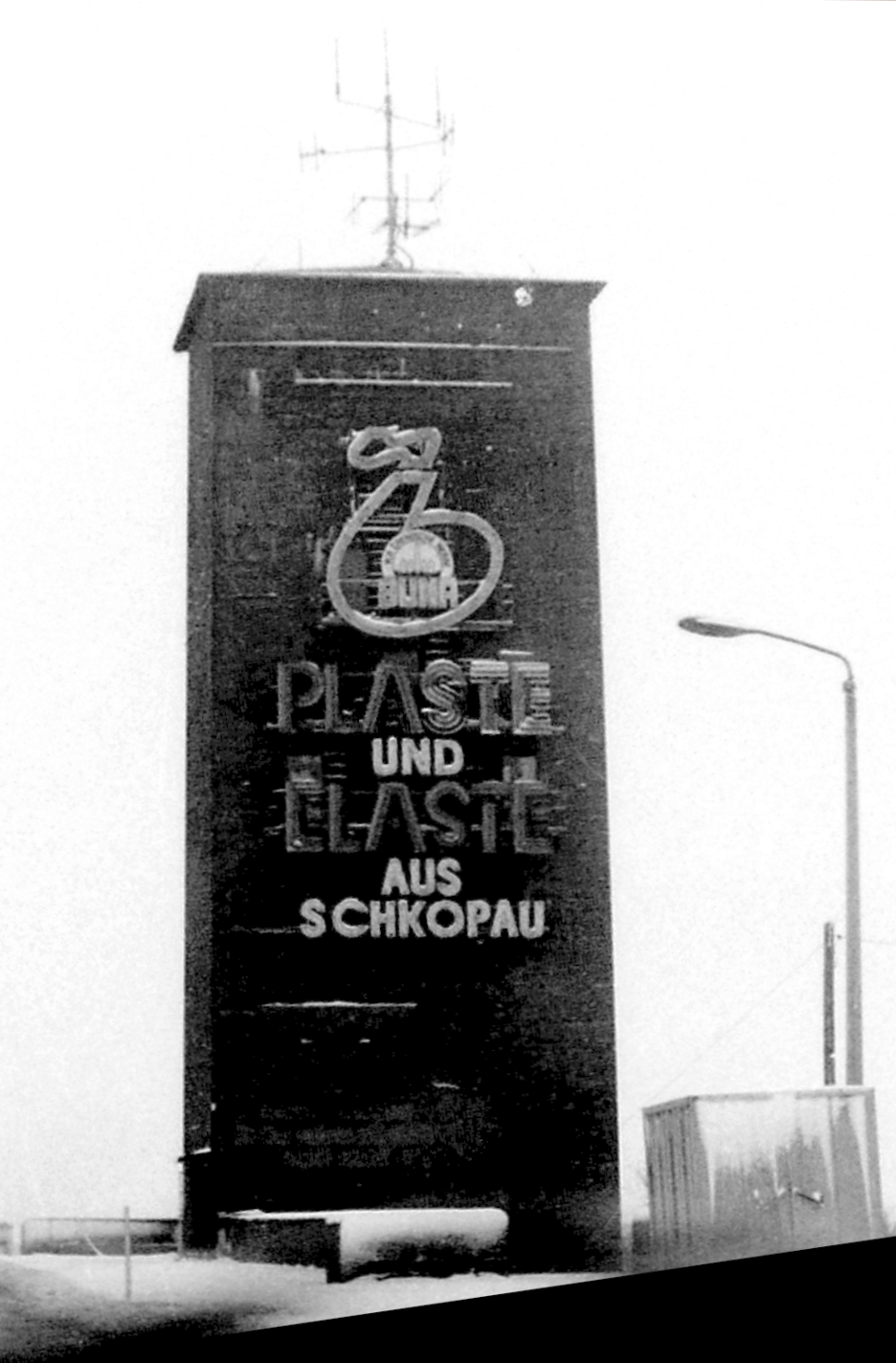
Plaste und Elaste neon sign, 1984

At the end of the 1950s, the advertising slogan Plaste und Elaste aus Schkopau ("Plastic and Elastomer from Schkopau") was introduced, in order to promote the spectrum of products of the Buna Chemical Works. The slogan was used especially on posters and neon lights. The best known light advert was on a tower on the northern abutment of the Elbe bridge at Vockerode on the transit route from Berlin to Hof (nowadays part of the BAB 9 motorway).

== See also ==
- Central Germany (cultural area)
- Central German Metropolitan Region
- Halle chemical workers district
