= Southern Germany =

Region in which Upper German dialects are spoken

Coordinates: 49°N 10°E

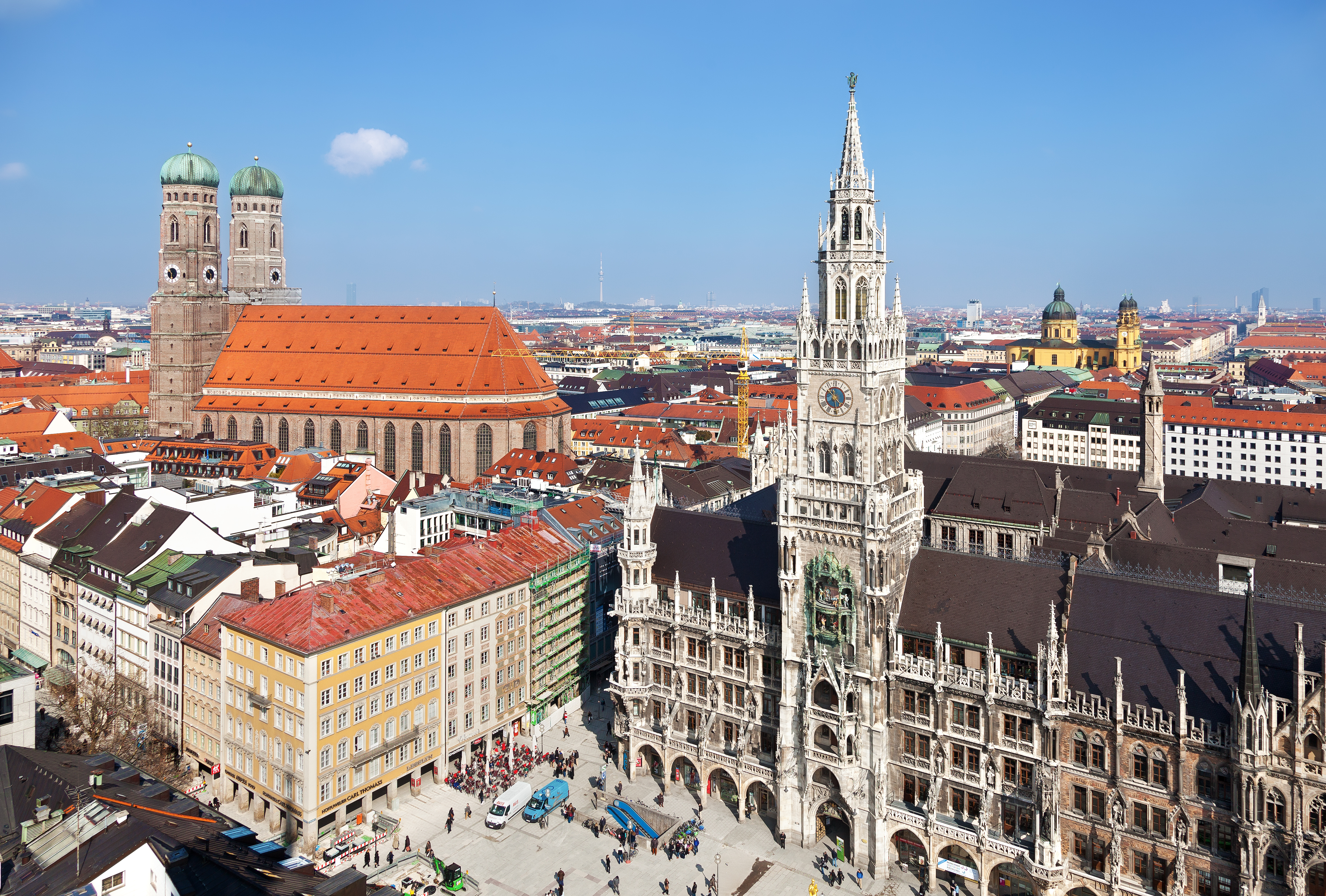
Munich in Bavaria, Germany, the most-populous city in Southern Germany with over 1.5 million residents as of 2024

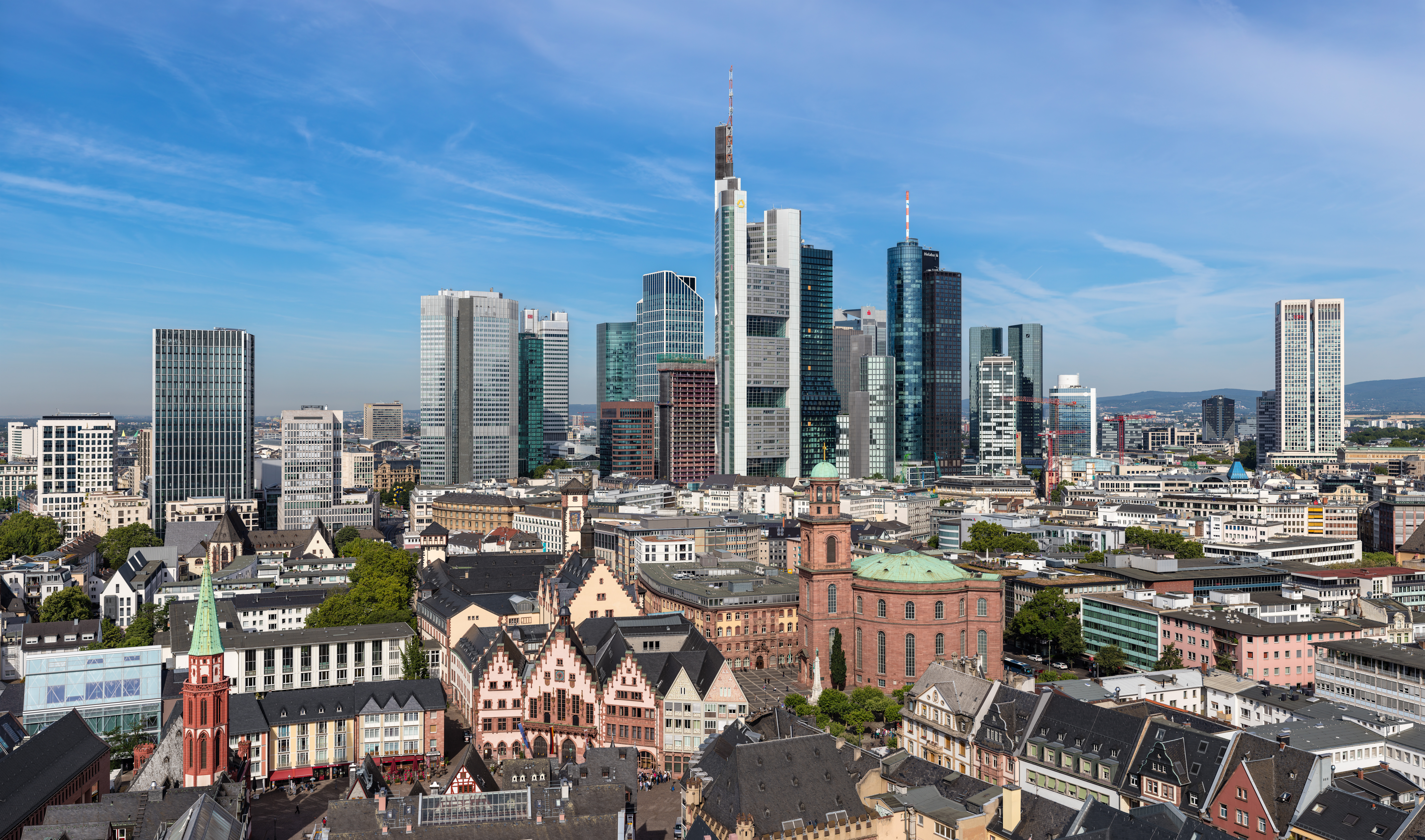
Frankfurt in Hesse, Germany, the second-most populous city in Southern Germany with over 773,000 residents as of 2022

Southern Germany (German: Süddeutschland, [ˈzyːtˌdɔʏtʃlant]) is a region of Germany that includes the areas in which Upper German dialects are spoken, which includes the stem duchies of Bavaria and Swabia in present-day Bavaria, Baden-Württemberg, and the southern portion of Hesse and Rhineland-Palatinate that were part of the Duchy of Franconia.

German-speaking Switzerland, Austria, Liechtenstein, Alsace, and South Tyrol are also historically, culturally, and linguistically associated with the region.

== Boundaries ==
Southern Germany primarily contrasts with Northern Germany and defines the territories of modern Germany that did not form part of the North German Confederation in the 19th century. Between Northern and Southern Germany is the loosely defined area known as Central Germany (Mitteldeutschland), roughly corresponding to the areal of Central German dialects (Franconia, Thuringia, Saxony).

The boundary between the spheres of political influence of Prussia (Northern Germany) and Austria (Southern Germany) within the German Confederation (1815–1866) was known as the "Main line" (Mainlinie, after the river Main), Frankfurt am Main being the seat of the federal assembly. The "Main line" did not follow the course of the River Main upstream of Frankfurt, however, it instead corresponded to the northern border of the Kingdom of Bavaria.

Linguistically, Southern Germany corresponds to the Upper German dialects. Southern Germany is culturally and linguistically more similar to German-speaking Switzerland, Austria, and German-speaking South Tyrol than to Central and Northern Germany. A jocular term referring to a cultural boundary defining Bavarian culture is Weißwurstäquator, i.e. the "equator" dividing Northern Germany from the homeland of the Weißwurst sausage.

== Geography ==
The river Main, flowing westward, through Upper and Lower Franconia and Southern Hesse, through the city of Frankfurt, into the river Rhine at Mainz, is often cited as a natural border between Southern and Middle Germany while the border west of Mainz is, in that respect, less clearly determined. The border between the Palatinate and the Rhineland—roughly a line between Bonn and Bingen, in the mountain ranges (Mittelgebirge) of the Westerwald, the Taunus, and the Eifel, along the Rhine and Mosel rivers—is seen as the cultural border between Southern and Western Germany.

== Population ==
Two of the most populous states of Germany, Baden-Württemberg and Bavaria, are part of Southern Germany. They have a combined population of 23.5 million people. In the broader sense (with Rhineland-Palatinate and the Saarland), Southern Germany includes roughly 30 million people. Thus, about 40% of the German population and almost 30% of all native speakers of the German language live there.

In the 17th and 18th centuries, emigrants from Southern Germany, specifically the Palatinate known as the Pennsylvania Dutch, were among the first settlers of the colonial-era Province of Pennsylvania and other influential population centers in present-day United States.

The region has a Catholic majority, but also a significant Lutheran Protestant population (especially in northern Württemberg and some parts of Baden and Franconia (northern Bavaria)), in contrast to the almost entirely Protestant Northern Germany. Due to the immigration of non-Christians, mainly Turks (see Turks in Germany) during the last decades of the twentieth century, there is also a small number (roughly 250,000, i.e. 2–3% of the population) of Muslims.

=== Major cities ===
Where a city has different names in English and German, the English name is given first.

State capital

Rank	City	Pop. 1950	Pop. 1960	Pop. 1970	Pop. 1980	Pop. 1990	Pop. 2000	Pop. 2010	Area [km^{2}]	Density per km^{2}	Growth [%] (2000– 2010)	surpassed 100,000	State (Bundesland)
1.	Munich / München	831,937	1,101,384	1,311,978	1,298,941	1,229,026	1,210,223	1,353,186	310,69	4,355	11.81	1852	Bavaria
2.	Frankfurt am Main	532,037	675,009	666,179	629,375	644,865	648,550	679,664	248,31	2,737	4.80	1875	Hesse
3.	Stuttgart	496,490	637,366	634,202	580,648	579,988	583,874	606,588	207,35	2,925	3.89	1874	Baden-Württemberg
4.	Nuremberg / Nürnberg	362,459	458,401	478,181	484,405	493,692	488,400	505,664	186,38	2,713	3.53	1881	Bavaria
5.	Mannheim	245,634	311,383	332,378	304,303	310,411	306,729	313,174	144,96	2,160	2.10	1897	Baden-Württemberg
6.	Karlsruhe	198,840	240,450	259,091	271,892	275,061	278,558	294,761	173,46	1,699	5.82	1901	Baden-Württemberg
7.	Wiesbaden	220,741	257,293	250,715	274,464	260,301	270,109	275,976	203,93	1,353	2.17	1905	Hesse
8.	Augsburg	185,183	206,422	213,230	248,346	256,877	254,982	264,708	146,84	1,803	3.81	1909	Bavaria
9.	Freiburg	109,717	141,637	163,568	175,106	191,029	205,102	224,191	153,06	1,465	9.31	1934	Baden-Württemberg
10.	Mainz	88,369	133,089	174,858	187,392	179,486	182,870	199,237	97,74	2,038	8.95	1908	Rhineland-Palatinate
Rank	City	Pop. 1950	Pop. 1960	Pop. 1970	Pop. 1980	Pop. 1990	Pop. 2000	Pop. 2010	Area [km^{2}]	Density per km^{2}	Growth [%] (2000– 2010)	surpassed 100,000	State (Land)

== Characteristics ==
Economically, Southern Germany is the strongest part of Germany, with Baden-Württemberg and Bavaria being the powerhouses of manufacturing, especially in the automobile and machinery industry. Furthermore, it is home to some of the country's most prestigious universities (such as the ones in Heidelberg, Munich, Tübingen, and Würzburg).

Germany's two busiest airports, Frankfurt Airport and Munich Airport are both located in the region. There are also minor international airports across Southern Germany such as Stuttgart Airport, Karlsruhe/Baden-Baden Airport, Nuremberg Airport, and Saarbrücken Airport. Other airports such as Zurich Airport, Strasbourg Airport and EuroAirport Basel-Mulhouse-Freiburg are also frequently used by passengers from the region.

The specific features of the landscape are rolling hills, Mittelgebirge (mid-range mountains). Southern Germany also has a part of the Alps, in the southeast of the region (Allgäu and Bavarian Alps). In the culinary field, both beer and wine are produced in many varieties throughout the region. The regional cuisine consists of stews, sausages, cabbage, noodles, and other pasta dishes as well as a variety of holiday cookies, cakes, and tarts.

== See also ==
- Northern Germany
- Central Germany (geography), Central Germany (cultural area)
- Old states of Germany, New states of Germany
- Weißwurstäquator
- Upper German
- Alemannic dialects
- Austro-Bavarian dialects
- East Franconian German
- South Franconian German
