= Weißwurst =

Traditional Bavarian sausage

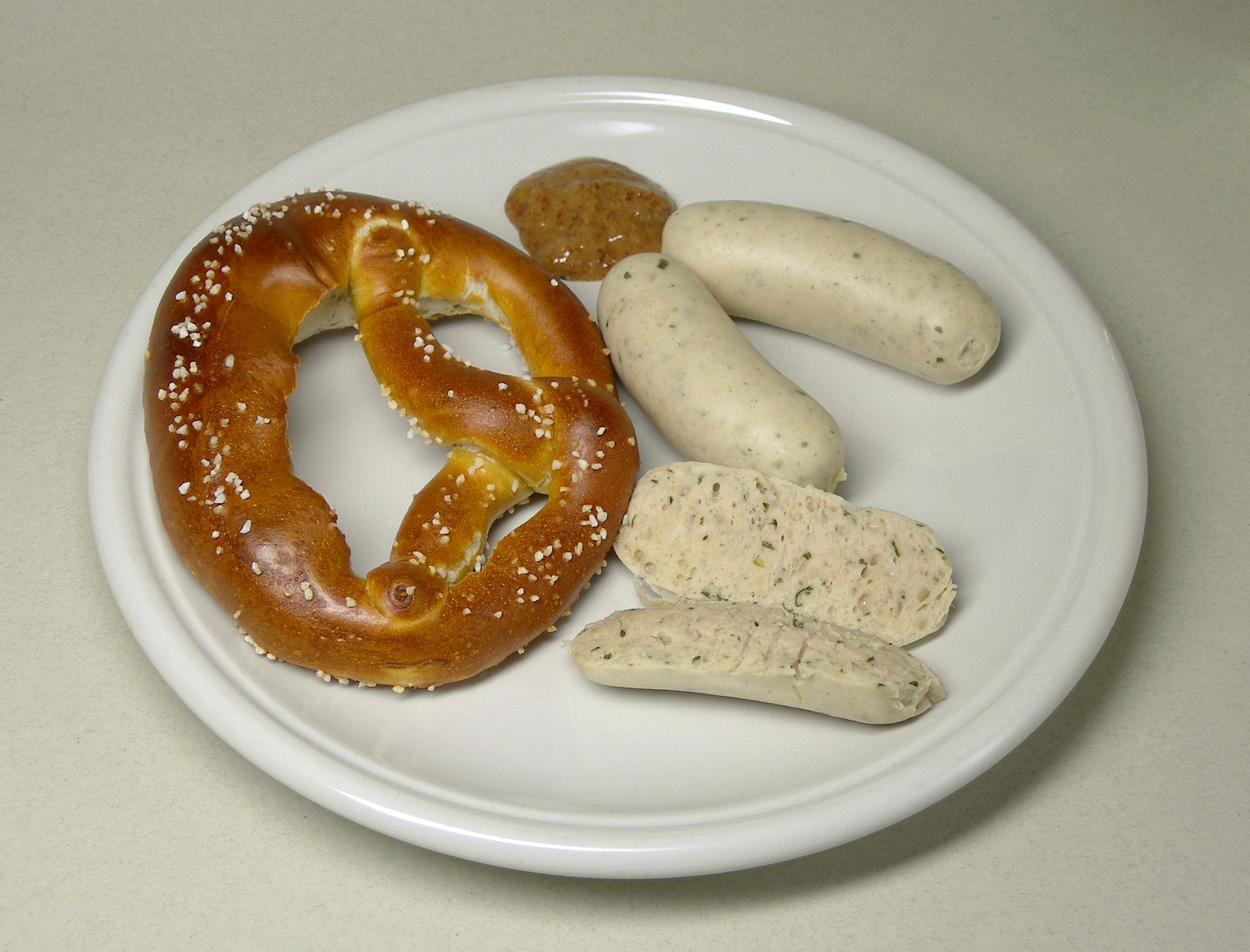
Traditional Weißwurst-meal, served with sweet mustard (Senf) and a soft pretzel

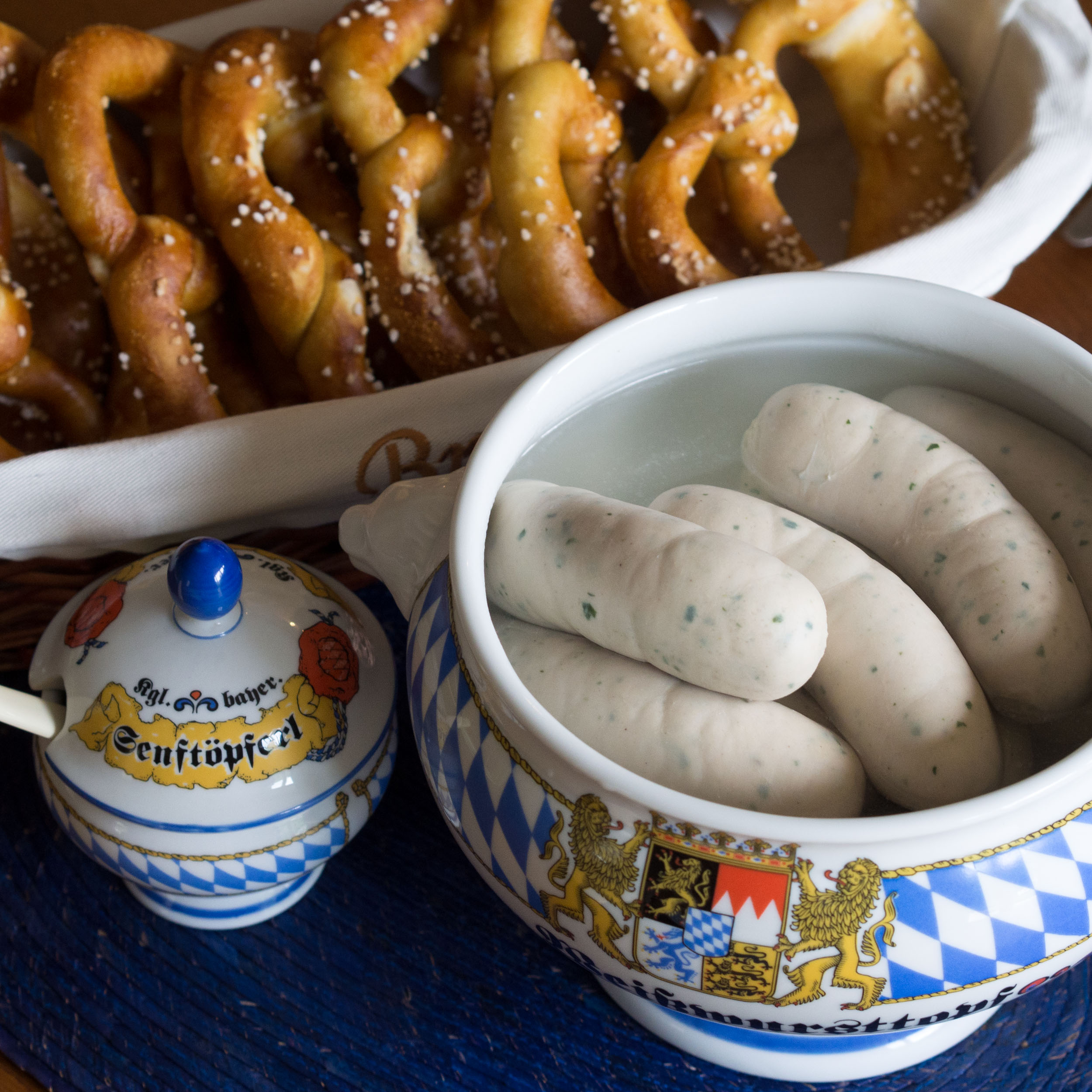
Weißwurst is brought to the table in a large bowl together with the cooking water.

Weißwurst ([ˈvaɪsvʊɐ̯st], literally 'white sausage'; Bavarian: Weißwuascht; plural Weißwürste) is a traditional Bavarian sausage made from minced veal and pork fatback. It is usually flavored with parsley, lemon, mace, onions, ginger and cardamom, although there are some variations. The mixture is stuffed into pork casings and separated into individual sausages measuring about 10 to 12 cm (3 7/8–4 3/4 in) in length and 3–4 cm (1 1/8–1 5/8 in) in diameter. In Poland, a similar kind of sausage, also named 'white sausage' (biała kiełbasa), is made from pork instead and most often served on Easter.

As they are not smoked or otherwise preserved they are very perishable. Weißwürste were traditionally manufactured early in the morning and prepared and eaten as a snack between breakfast and lunch. There is a saying that the sausages should not be allowed to hear the noon chime of the church bells. Even today, most Bavarians never eat Weißwürste after lunchtime (though it is perfectly acceptable to have a lunch consisting of Weißwürste).

The sausages are heated in water, not boiled, until they turn white, as no nitrite is used in Weißwurst preparation.

Weißwürste are brought to the table in a big bowl together with the hot water used for preparation (so they do not cool down too much), then eaten without their skins. Ways of eating Weißwurst include the traditional way, called zuzeln (Bavarian for sucking), in which each end of the sausage is cut or bitten open, after which the meat is sucked out from the skin. Alternatively, the more popular and more discreet ways of consuming it are by cutting the sausage lengthwise and then "rolling out" the meat from the skin with a fork, or also to open it on one end and consume it very much like a banana, ever opening the peel further and dipping the sausage into the mustard.

Weißwurst is commonly served with a Bavarian sweet mustard (Süßer Senf) and accompanied by Brezn (Bavarian pretzel—often spelled Brezeln outside Bavaria) and Weißbier.

Weißwurst, whose consumption traditionally is associated with Bavaria, helped in the coining of a humorous term, Weißwurstäquator (literally, 'white-sausage-equator'), that delineates a cultural boundary separating other linguistic and cultural areas from Southern Germany.

== Biała kiełbasa in Poland ==
Biała kiełbasa is a very similar type of sausage prepared in Poland, but unlike Weißwurst, it is made from pork, especially pork shoulder, neck fat (a cut referred to in Polish as podgardle) and belly. Originating from the Greater Poland region, it has been made as early as the 17th century.

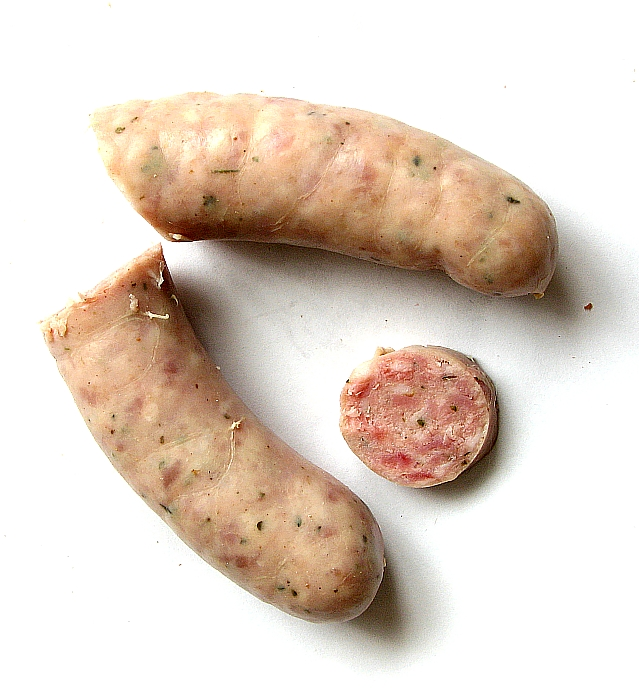
Polish white sausage

Biała kiełbasa is most commonly served during Easter, alongside horseradish or sour cereal soup (żurek). It is also often included in święconka, traditional baskets of food that are taken to churches in order to be blessed with holy water on Holy Saturday, where it is believed to be symbolic of abundance (meat being historically scarce).

To make biała kiełbasa, pork shoulder, neck and belly are ground, sometimes with a small amount of beef. Then, the meat mixture is flavoured, most often with salt, garlic, black pepper and marjoram and encased in pork intestines. The sausages have a short shelf life and need to be cooked or roasted before consumption.

== See also ==
- Bockwurst
- Brühwurst
- List of veal dishes
- White hot
