= Benrath line =

German isogloss line

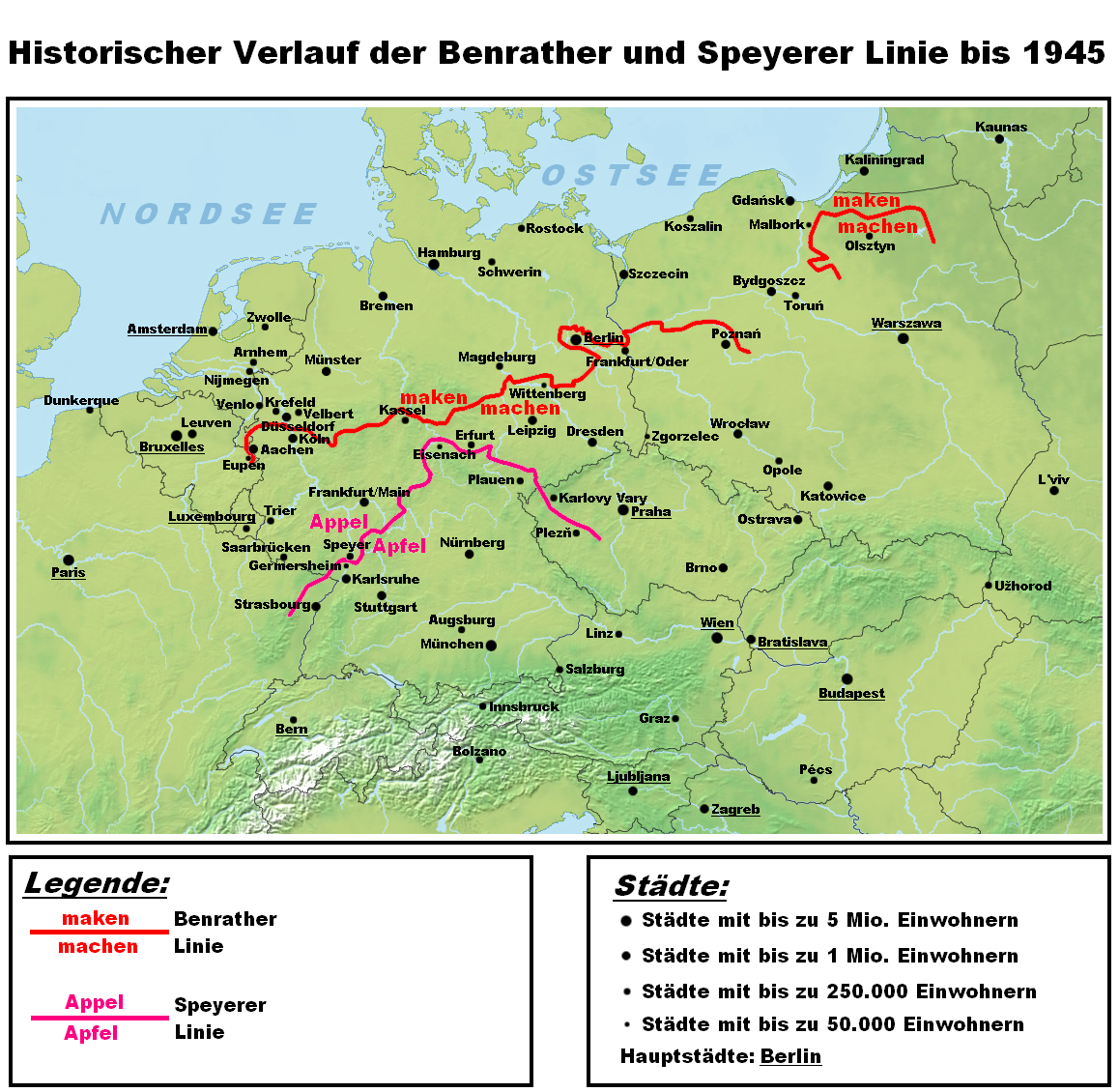
The Benrath (maken–machen) and Speyer line (Appel–Apfel), the main isoglosses of the continental West Germanic languages

In German linguistics, the Benrath line (German: Benrather Linie) is the maken–machen isogloss: dialects north of the line have the original /k/ in maken (to make), while those to the south have the innovative /x/ (machen). The line runs from Aachen in the west via Benrath (south of Düsseldorf) to eastern Germany near Frankfurt an der Oder in the area of Berlin and Dessau and through former East Prussia dividing Low Prussian dialect and High Prussian dialect. It is called Benrath line because Benrath is the place where it crosses the Rhine.

The High German consonant shift (3rd to 9th centuries AD), in which the (northern) Low German dialects for the most part did not participate, affected the southern varieties of the West Germanic dialect continuum. This shift is traditionally seen to distinguish the High German varieties from the other West Germanic languages.

The Benrath line does not mark the northernmost extent of the shift's effects. The Uerdingen line, marking the ik-ich alternation, lies somewhat further north, and a mixture of shifted and unshifted forms occurs in the zone between the two isoglosses. This traditional account of a single shift diffusing geographically from a southern origin point has, however, in more recent times been challenged by scholars like Garry W. Davis, who argue instead that the shift arose independently and in parallel across the various Old High German dialects, driven by shared prosodic pressures, making the assumption of a single directional "south to north" spread unnecessary.

== See also ==
- Speyer line
- Uerdingen line
- Joret line
- Sankt Goar line
