= High German consonant shift =

Series of sound changes affecting some West Germanic languages

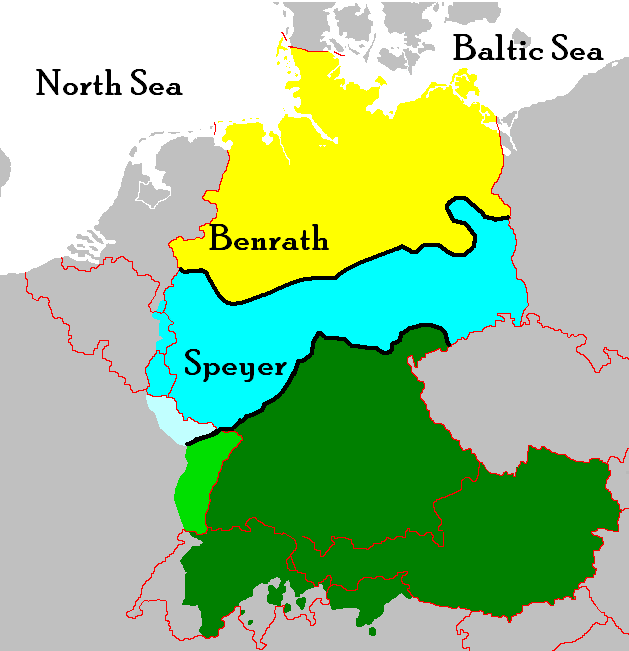
The High German languages are subdivided into Upper German (green) and Central German (cyan), and are distinguished from Low German (yellow) and the Low Franconian languages. The main isoglosses – the Benrath and Speyer lines – are marked in black. This map shows the modern boundaries of the languages after 1945.

In historical linguistics, the High German consonant shift or second Germanic consonant shift is a phonological development (sound change) that took place in the southern parts of the West Germanic dialect continuum. The shift is used to distinguish High German from other continental West Germanic languages, namely Low Franconian (including standard Dutch) and Low German, which experienced no shift. The shift resulted in the affrication or spirantization of the West Germanic voiceless stop consonants /t/, /p/, and /k/, depending on position in a word. A related change, the devoicing of the voiced stopped consonants /d/, /b/ and /ɡ/, was less widespread, and only the devoicing of /d/ is found in most dialects.

There is no consensus on when the High German consonant shift occurred; it probably began between the 3rd and 5th centuries and was complete before the first written examples in Old High German, the earliest recorded stage of High German, were produced in the 8th century. There is also no consensus on where or how the shift proceeded.

The degree of shift varies within High German. Dialects that experienced the most shift are referred to as Upper German, whereas those that only experienced some are referred to as Central German. Different dialects within Upper and Central German also received different levels of shift. West Central German, for example, exhibits what is known as the Rhenish fan, a gradual reduction of which consonants are shifted, as one moves north.

== General description ==
In most accounts, the High German consonant shift consists of two related changes:

1. the Proto-West Germanic voiceless stop consonants /t/, /p/, and /k/ spirantize to /s/, /f/, /x/, or else affricate to /ts/, /pf/, /kx/, depending on their position in the word (Tenuesverschiebung). No shift takes place after a fricative (/sp/, /xt/, /st/, /ft/, etc. all remain unchanged) or in the combination /tr/ (/pr/ and /kr/ are still affected);
2. the pre-Old High German voiced stop consonants /d/, /b/, and /ɡ/ (from Proto-West Germanic /ð/, /β/, and /ɣ/) devoice to the voiceless stop consonants /t/, /p/, and /k/ (Medienverschiebung).

All High German dialects have experienced at least part of the shift of voiceless stops to fricatives/affricates. The shift of voiceless stops to fricatives/affricates has traditionally been used to distinguish different German dialects: Upper German dialects experienced the greatest degree of shift, whereas Central German dialects only experienced a partial shift (other West Germanic languages experienced no shift). Only southern dialects experience the shift of voiced to voiceless stops: the shift of /d/ to /t/ is found in Upper German and in some Central German dialects, while the shift of /b/ to /p/ and /ɡ/ to /k/ is only found consistently in (Old) Bavarian. (Note: The shift of voiceless to voiced stops is reversed in many Upper and Central German dialects by a process of lenition, beginning around 1300 in parts of Bavarian.)

Modern standard German is based mostly on East Central German dialects and thus features many but not all of the shifted forms. In particular, of the Medienverschiebung consonants, only the shift of /d/ to /t/ is found in almost all instances in the modern standard. The shift results in characteristic differences between modern standard German and other Germanic languages, such as:

German Wasser vs. English water, Dutch water, Swedish vatten (German /s/ vs. other Germanic /t/)
German Zunge vs. English tongue, Dutch tong, Swedish tunga (German /ts/ vs. other Germanic /t/)
German Schiff vs. English ship, Dutch schip, Swedish skepp (German /f/ vs. other Germanic /p/)
German Apfel vs. English apple, Dutch appel, Swedish äpple (German /pf/ vs. other Germanic /p/)
German gleich vs. English like, Dutch gelijk, Swedish lik (German /x/ vs. other Germanic /k/)
German Tochter vs. English daughter, Dutch dochter, Swedish dotter (German /t/ vs. other Germanic /d/)

Excluding loanwords from Low German and foreign borrowings (e.g. Park from French parc, a doublet of German Pferch, both from Latin parricus), Modern Standard German has retained unshifted /p t k/ only after a fricative (e.g. Stein, English stone) or in the combination /tr/ (e.g. treu, English true).

Another change, the shift of /þ/ (/θ/) to /d/, is sometimes seen as related to the High German consonant shift. However, it also comes to encompass the other continental West Germanic languages. The relation of this change to the second consonant shift, as well as that of another change, that of initial /x/ to /h/, is disputed. Braune and Reiffenstein discount a connection entirely.

== Detailed description ==
=== Shifts from voiceless stops ===
The result of the shift of the voiceless stops /p t k/ depends on their position in the word. The degree to which the stops are shifted also shows considerable variation between Upper German and Central German dialects. In particular, the shift of /p/ and /k/ in initial position is subject to dialectal variation.

- /t/ shifts

to /t͡s/ initially, in geminates, and after another consonant: (Note: Examples from Schweikle 1996, p. 130.)

Old Saxon tehan : OHG zehan (English ten, modern German zehn)
Old Saxon herta : OHG herza (English heart, modern German Herz)
Old Saxon settian : OHG sezzen (English set, modern German setzen)

to ⟨ȥȥ⟩ after a vowel, simplifying to ⟨ȥ⟩ at the end of a word, as well as frequently after a long vowel: (Note: The examples are from Schweikle 1996, p. 129)

Old Saxon etan : OHG ezzan (English eat, modern German essen)
Old Saxon bîtan : OHG bîzan (English bite, modern German beißen)
Old Saxon ût : OHG ûz (English out, modern German aus)

Both of these shifts affect /t/ in all High German dialects. However, the Central German Middle Franconian dialects show unshifted final /t/ for neuter pronouns (that, thit, it, wat, allet). Beginning in the 13th century, the fricative /ȥ/ merges with /s/ in most German dialects.

- /p/ shifts

to /p͡f/ initially, in geminates, and after another consonant: (Note: Examples from Schweikle 1996, p. 130.)

Old Saxon piper : OHG pfeffar (English pepper, modern German Pfeffer)
Old Saxon helpan : OHG helphan/helfan (English help, modern German helfen) (Note: The simplification of /lpf/ and /rpf/ to /lf/ and /rf/ began in the 9th century.)
Old Saxon skeppian : OHG skephen (English scoop, modern German schöpfen)

to /ff/ after a vowel, simplifying to /f/ at the end of a word, as well as often after a long vowel: (Note: The examples are from Schweikle 1996, p. 129)

Old Saxon piper : pfeffar (English pepper, modern German Pfeffer)
Old Saxon grîpan : OHG grîf(f)an (English gripe, modern German greifen)
Old Saxon skip : OHG scif (English ship, modern German Schiff)

In Central German Middle and most Rhine Franconian dialects, the shift only takes place after a vowel:

Different outcomes of /p/, according to Salmons 2018, p. 123
Old Saxon	(most) Franconian	Rest of OHG
pad	pad	pfad
appel	appel	apful
kamp	kamp	kampf
helpan	helpan/helpfan	helpfan/helfan
opan	of(f)an	of(f)an
up	ûf	ûf

Additionally, some Middle Franconian dialects retain final /p/ in the preposition up.

- /k/ shifts

to /k͡x/ initially, in geminates, and after another consonant: (Note: Examples from Schweikle 1996, p. 130.)

Old Saxon korn : Upper OHG chorn (English corn, modern German Korn)
Old Saxon werk : Upper OHG werch (English work, modern German Werk)
Old Saxon wekkian : OHG wecchan (English awake, modern German wecken)

to /xx/ after a vowel, simplifying to /x/ at the end of a word, as well as often after a long vowel: (Note: The examples are from Schweikle 1996, p. 129)

Old Saxon brekan : OHG brehhan (English break, modern German brechen)
Old Saxon juk : OHG joh (English yoke, modern German Joch)

All dialects shift /k/ to /xx/ after a vowel; only the Upper German Alemannic and Bavarian shift it in other positions:

Different outcomes of /k/, according to Salmons 2018, p. 123
Old Saxon	Central OHG	Far southern OHG
kind	kind	chind
stark	stark	starch
makon	mahhon	mahhon
ik	ih	ih

/p t k/ remained unshifted in all dialects when following the fricative consonants /s/, /f/, and /x/ (examples: OHG spinnan Engl. 'spin', OHG stein Engl. 'stone, OHG naht Engl. 'night'). In addition, /t/ remained unshifted in the combination /tr/ (examples: OHG tretan Engl. 'tread', OHG bittar Engl. 'bitter' [from West Germanic *bitra]).

=== Shifts from voiced consonants ===
In the so-called Medienverschiebung, the voiced consonants /d b ɡ/ devoice to /t p k/. (Note: Prior to this shift, the West Germanic fricatives /ð β ɣ/ had shifted to /d b g/ in all positions except in the Central German Middle Franconian dialect, where /β/ and /ɣ/ remained. In many other German dialects, /ɡ/ and /b/ spirantize word internally; however, this appears to be later development, as shown by their partaking in final devoicing as stop consonants rather than fricatives.) Like the shift to the voiceless stops, the shift to the voiced stops varies by dialect and to some degree by position in the word. In those Upper German dialects that shifted all three stops, there was likely no longer any distinction between voiced and voiceless consonants.

- /d/ > /t/: (Note: Examples from Schweikle 1996, p. 131.)

Old Saxon dor : OHG tor (English door, modern German Tor)
Old Saxon biodan : OHG biotan (no English equivalent, modern German bieten)
Old Saxon biddian : OHG bitten (English bid, modern German bitten)

This shift is found in Upper German and most Central German, but in Rhine Franconian only in geminates and word finally. (Note: In Middle High German, the sequence /nt/ mostly changes to /nd/, as found in modern standard German: Middle High German: binden vs. Old High German: bintan.)

- /b/ > /p/: (Note: Examples from Schweikle 1996, p. 131.)

Old Saxon blōd : Upper OHG pluat (English blood, modern German Blut)
Old Saxon sibbia : OHG sippa (English sib, modern German Sippe)

This change is found most consistently in Bavarian, where it takes place in all positions. In Alemannic, it is consistently found word finally and word initially, but b often occurs word-internally. /bb/ shifts to /pp/ in all dialects except in (Central German) Ripuarian.

- /ɡ/ > /k/: (Note: Examples from Schweikle 1996, p. 131.)

Old Saxon geban : Upper OHG keban/kepan (English give, modern German geben)
Old Saxon hruggi : OHG rucki (English ridge, modern German Rücken)

The change is found in Bavarian and Alemannic, most consistently word-initially, and in Bavarian also word-internally and finally. /ɡɡ/ shifts to /kk/ in all dialects except in (Central German) Ripuarian.

The effects of the Medienverschiebung are most visible in the shift of /d/ to /t/; this is the change with the widest spread and the only one that was not partially reversed in the Old High German period. (Note: The lack of a return of shifted /t/ (=earlier /d/) to /d/ in those dialects that underwent the shift is likely related to the subsequent shift of /þ/ (=/θ) to /d/ throughout the West Germanic area.) On the other hand, while early Bavarian and Alemannic both show a shift of /g b/ to /k p/, by the 9th century in Alemannic reverts to writing ⟨ɡ⟩ and ⟨b⟩ except for the geminated stops /kk/ and /pp/, and in the 10th century, Bavarian also begins to write ⟨ɡ⟩ and ⟨b⟩ more often. By the Middle High German period, Bavarian consistently writes ⟨p⟩ for single /b/ only in word-initial position - the state preserved in modern southern Bavarian dialects. (Note: In modern dialects, the shift is further disguised in northern Bavarian and Alemannic dialects by inner-German lenition, a shift of /t p k/ to /d b ɡ/ that takes place after 1350.)

=== Table of changes ===
Examples of consonant changes resulting from the High German consonant shift, according to Polenz (2020), pp. 44–45 and Schweikle (1996), pp. 129–131
Type of stop	Position	Proto-Germanic/Pre-Old High German Phoneme	Old High German Phoneme	Old High German word	modern standard German equivalent	Old Saxon equivalent	modern English equivalent
Voiceless	After vowels	/t/	/ȥ(ȥ)/ (Note: The precise value of this sound is unknown, but it was distinct from the sound written ⟨s⟩ (Braune & Reiffenstein 2004, pp. 167–168). Although often written as ⟨ʒ⟩ or ⟨ȥ⟩ in modern grammars and textbooks, in original Old High German and Middle High German texts, it was usually written ⟨z⟩ and thus not distinguished from the affricate /ts/ (Braune & Reiffenstein 2004, p. 15)(Paul, Wiehl & Grosse 1998, p. 31).)	eȥȥan	essen	etan	eat
Voiceless	After vowels	/t/	/ȥ(ȥ)/	bîȥan	beißen	bîtan	bite
Voiceless	After vowels	/t/	/ȥ(ȥ)/	waȥ	was	wat	what
Voiceless	After vowels	/p/	/f(f)/	offan	offen	opan	open
Voiceless	After vowels	/p/	/f(f)/	grîfan	greifen	grîpan	gripe
Voiceless	After vowels	/p/	/f(f)/	ûf	auf	ûp	up
Voiceless	After vowels	/k/	/χ(χ)/	mahhôn	machen	makôn	make
Voiceless	After vowels	/k/	/χ(χ)/	brehhan	brechen	brekan	break
Voiceless	After vowels	/k/	/χ(χ)/	ih	ich	ik	I (Old English ic)
Voiceless	Initially, after consonants, and geminated	/t/	/ts/	zunga	Zunge	tunga	tongue
Voiceless	Initially, after consonants, and geminated	/t/	/ts/	herza	Herz	herta	heart
Voiceless	Initially, after consonants, and geminated	/tt/	/ts/	sezzen	setzen	settian	set
Voiceless	Initially, after consonants, and geminated	/p/	/pf/	phad	Pfad	pad	path
Voiceless	Initially, after consonants, and geminated	/p/	/pf/	helphan	helfen	helpan	help
Voiceless	Initially, after consonants, and geminated	/pp/	/pf/	aphul	Apfel	appul	apple
Voiceless	Initially, after consonants, and geminated	/k/	/kχ/	Upper German chorn	Korn	korn	corn
Voiceless	Initially, after consonants, and geminated	/k/	/kχ/	Upper German werch	Werk	werk	work
Voiceless	Initially, after consonants, and geminated	/kk/	/kχ/	Upper German wec(c)hen	wecken	wekkian	Old English weccen
Voiced	All positions	/d/ (Note: The pre-Old High German phonemes /d b ɡ/ are the results of an earlier shift of West Germanic /ð β ɣ/ in all positions (Fulk 2018, p. 134).)	/t/	tohter	Tochter	dohtar	daughter
Voiced	All positions	/d/	/t/	wetar	Wetter	wedar	weather
Voiced	All positions	/d/	/t/	bintan	binden	bindan	bind
Voiced	All positions	/d/	/t/	alt	alt	ald	old
Voiced	All positions	/dd/	/tt/	bitten	bitten	biddian	bid
Voiced	All positions	/b/	/p/	Upper German peran	(ge)bären	beran	bear
Voiced	All positions	/b/	/p/	Upper German sipun	sieben	sibun	seven
Voiced	All positions	/b/	/p/	Upper German lîp	Leib	lîf	life
Voiced	All positions	/bb/	/pp/	sippa	Sippe	sibbia	Old English sib
Voiced	All positions	/ɡ/	/k/	Upper German kast	Gast	gast	guest
Voiced	All positions	/ɡ/	/k/	Upper German stîkan	steigen	stîgan	Old English stîgan
Voiced	All positions	/ɡ/	/k/	Upper German tac	Tag	dag	day
Voiced	All positions	/ɡɡ/	/kk/	rucki	Rücken	hruggi	ridge

== Chronology ==
There is no agreement about the time period in which the High German consonantal shift took place. Its completion is usually dated to just before the earliest attestations of Old High German (8th century CE). The change affects geminate consonants in a different manner than simple consonants, indicating that West Germanic gemination predated it; the gemination is usually dated to the 5th century CE. Additionally, Latin loanwords adopted into the language prior to the 6th century display the shift, whereas those adopted from the 8th century onward do not. The relative chronology of the different changes remains poorly understood. It is usually argued to have begun with /t/, then moved to /p/, then to /k/.

== Geographical distribution ==
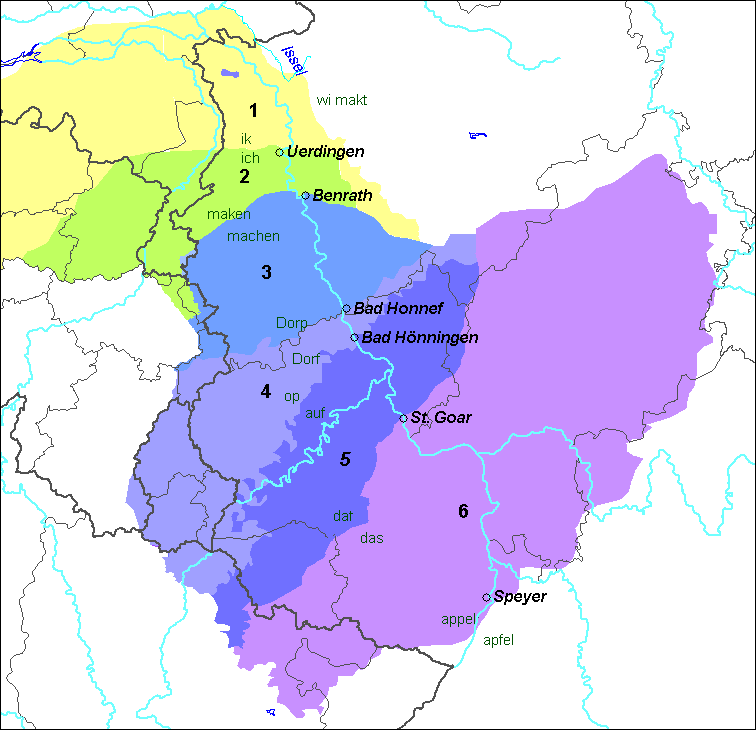
The Rhenish fan: 1 North Low Franconian, 2 South Low Franconian, 3 Ripuarian Franconian, 4 & 5 Moselle Franconian, 6 Rhine Franconian

Although the boundaries of the dialects have shifted since the Old High German period, the degree to which dialects underwent the High German consonant shift continues to form the basis for differentiating the different modern German dialects, and, in particular, for the division between Central German dialects, which have fewer shifted consonants, and Upper German dialects, which have more. The gradually increasing application of the shift from north to south is most extensive in the west. Here, the isoglosses defined by the occurrence of individual shifts are spread out in a fan-like manner, forming the Rheinischer Fächer ('Rhenish fan').

The northern border for the occurrence of the shift of /t/ to /(t)s/ in all positions (except in absolute final position in pronouns like dat, wat and the neuter ending -t) and the shift of /p/ and /k/ to /f/ and /x/ in intervocalic and root-final position is the Benrath line that separates the High German dialects to the south from the Low Saxon and Low Franconian dialects to the north. Further north, the consonant shift is only found with the adverb auch 'also' and a handful of pronouns that have final /k/ shifted to /x/ (ich 'I', dich 'thee', mich 'me') in the South Low Franconian dialect area, whose northern border is the Uerdingen line. (Note: A special case is observed in the dialect of Wermelskirchen, where the Benrath and Uerdingen lines meet. Here, in addition to the South Low Franconian shift of absolute final /k/ to /x/ in ich etc., intervocalic and root-final /p/, /t/ and /k/ undergo a shift only when preceded by a historically short high or mid vowel (e.g. etan > esən 'eat'), and remain unshifted after long vowels, diphthongs and the low vowels /a/ and /aː/, and also in all other positions (e.g. laːtan > lɔːtən 'let'). This phonologically conditioned distribution of shifted and unshifted voiceless stops is highly regular and not the result of lexical diffusion; it even occurs in the conjugation paradigms of strong verbs, e.g. riːtən 'tear' vs. jəresən 'torn'; jriːpən 'seize' vs. jəjrefən 'seized'.)

The shift of /p/ to /f/ after consonants (e.g. helpan > helfen 'help') sets off Moselle Franconian dialects from Ripuarian dialects, which retain unshifted /p/. The shift of /t/ to /s/ in wat, dat > was, das etc. characterizes Rhine Franconian. The shift of root-initial and historically geminated /p/ to /pf/ (Pund > Pfund 'pound', Appel > Apfel 'apple') marks the transition from the West Central German to the Upper German dialects. East Central German is separated from West Central German through having shifted initial p (the "Pund-Fund" line); only far southern East Central German dialects retain initial /pf-/, whereas other East Central German dialects have simplified it to initial /f-/. The shift of root-initial and historically geminated /k/ to /kx/ (and further to /x/, as in Kind > Chind) occurs in the southern part of the Upper German dialect area.

Scope of the High German consonant shift in the major continental West Germanic dialect groups (Schrijver 2014, pp. 97–104)
	-C(-) /t/ > /s/	#C- /t/ > /ts/	-CC- /tt/ > /ts/	-[l/r]C- /tt/ > /ts/	-C# (Note: Only in *wat, *dat etc.) /t/ > /s/	-C(-) /p/ > /f/	#C- /p/ > /pf/	-CC- /pp/ > /pf/	-[l/r]C- /p/ > /pf/ (Note: In most dialects /f/)	-C# (Note: Only in *u(ː)p) /p/ > /f/	-C(-) /k/ > /x/	#C- /k/ > /kx/	-CC- /kk/ > /kx/	-[l/r]C- /k/ > /kx/	-C# (Note: Only in *ik, *dik, *mik, *auk) /k/ > /x/
Low Saxon / North Low Franconian	✗	✗	✗	✗	✗	✗	✗	✗	✗	✗	✗	✗	✗	✗	✗
South Low Franconian	✗	✗	✗	✗	✗	✗	✗	✗	✗	✗	✗	✗	✗	✗	✓
Ripuarian	✓	✓	✓	✓	✗	✓	✗	✗	✗	✗	✓	✗	✗	✗	✓
Moselle Franconian	✓	✓	✓	✓	✗	✓	✗	✗	✓	✗ / ✓ (Note: Only in the southeastern half of the Moselle Franconian area)	✓	✗	✗	✗	✓
Rhine Franconian	✓	✓	✓	✓	✓	✓	✗	✗	✓	✓	✓	✗	✗	✗	✓
East Central German	✓	✓	✓	✓	✓	✓	✓ (Note: /pf/ only in the south, northern and central dialects have /f/)	✗ (Note: A small transitional area in Thuringia has shifted /pf/)	✓	✓	✓	✗	✗	✗	✓
Upper German	✓	✓	✓	✓	✓	✓	✓	✓	✓	✓	✓	✗ / ✓ (Note: Only in the southern part, in Swiss varieties mostly /x/)	✗ / ✓ (Note: Only in the southern part)	✗ / ✓ (Note: Only in the southern part)	✓

== See also ==
- Glottalic theory
- The Tuscan gorgia, a similar evolution differentiating the Tuscan dialects from Standard Italian.

== Sources ==
- Braune, Wilhelm; Reiffenstein, Ingo (2004). Althochdeutsche Grammatik (15 ed.). Niemeyer.
- Davis, Garry W. (2005). "Entstehung und Alter der Hochdeutschen Lautverschiebung in Wermelskirchen". Zeitschrift für Dialektologie und Linguistik. 72 (3): 257–277. JSTOR 40505392.
- Ebert, Robert P.; Reichmann, Oskar; Solms, Hans-Joachim; Wegera, Klaus-Peter (1993). Ebert, Robert P.; Reichmann, Oskar; Solms, Hans-Joachim; Wegera, Klaus-Peter (eds.). Frühneuhochdeutsche Grammatik. de Gruyter. doi:10.1515/9783110920130. ISBN 978-3-484-10672-7.
- Fulk, R.D. (2018). A Comparative Grammar of the Early Germanic Languages. Studies in Germanic Linguistics. Vol. 3. John Benjamins. doi:10.1075/sigl.3. ISBN 978-90-272-6312-4.
- Höder, Steffan (2015) [2013]. "Zweite Lautverschiebung". Wörterbücher zur Sprach- und Kommunikationswissenschaft (WSK) Online.
- Iverson, Gregory K.; Salmons, Joseph C. (2006). "Fundamental Regularities in the Second Consonant Shift". Journal of Germanic Linguistics. 18 (1): 45–70. doi:10.1017/S147054270600002X.
- König, Werner (1994). dtv-Atlas zur deutschen Sprache (10 ed.). Deutscher Taschenbuch Verlag.
- Paul, Hermann; Wiehl, Peter; Grosse, Siegfried (1998). Mittelhochdeutsche Grammatik (24 ed.). Niemeyer.
- Pickl, Simon (2023). "(High) German". Oxford Research Encyclopedia of Linguistics. doi:10.1093/acrefore/9780199384655.013.939. ISBN 978-0-19-938465-5.
- Polenz, Peter von (2020). Geschichte der deutschen Sprache (11 ed.). de Gruyter. doi:10.1515/9783110485660.
- Salmons, Joseph (2018). A History of German: What the Past Reveals about Today's Language (2 ed.). Oxford University Press.
- Schrijver, Peter (2014). Language contact and the origins of the Germanic languages. Routledge.
- Schweikle, Günther (1996). Germanisch-deutsche Sprachgeschichte im Überblick (4 ed.). J. B. Metzler.
- Sonderegger, Stefan (1979). Grundzüge deutscher Sprachgeschichte. Diachronie des Sprachsystems. Vol. 1. de Gruyter. doi:10.1515/9783110842005.
- Young, Christopher; Gloning, Thomas (2004). A History of German Through Texts. Routledge.
