= Central Germany (cultural area) =

Economic and cultural region in Germany

Coordinates: 51°20′N 12°10′E

Central Germany (German: Mitteldeutschland [ˈmɪtl̩ˌdɔʏtʃlant]) is an economic and cultural region in Germany. Its exact borders depend on context, but it is often defined as being a region within the federal states of Saxony, Thuringia and Saxony-Anhalt, or a smaller part of this region, such as the metropolitan area of Leipzig and Halle plus the surrounding counties.

The name dates from the German Empire, when the region was approximately in the centre of the country. Since the German Empire's eastern territories became part of Poland and Russia in the aftermath of World War II, "Central Germany" has been located east of the centre of the country, but the name is still often used in business, media and by the Central German Metropolitan Region. Against this background, the term is not or no longer to be understood as a geographic term.

== History ==
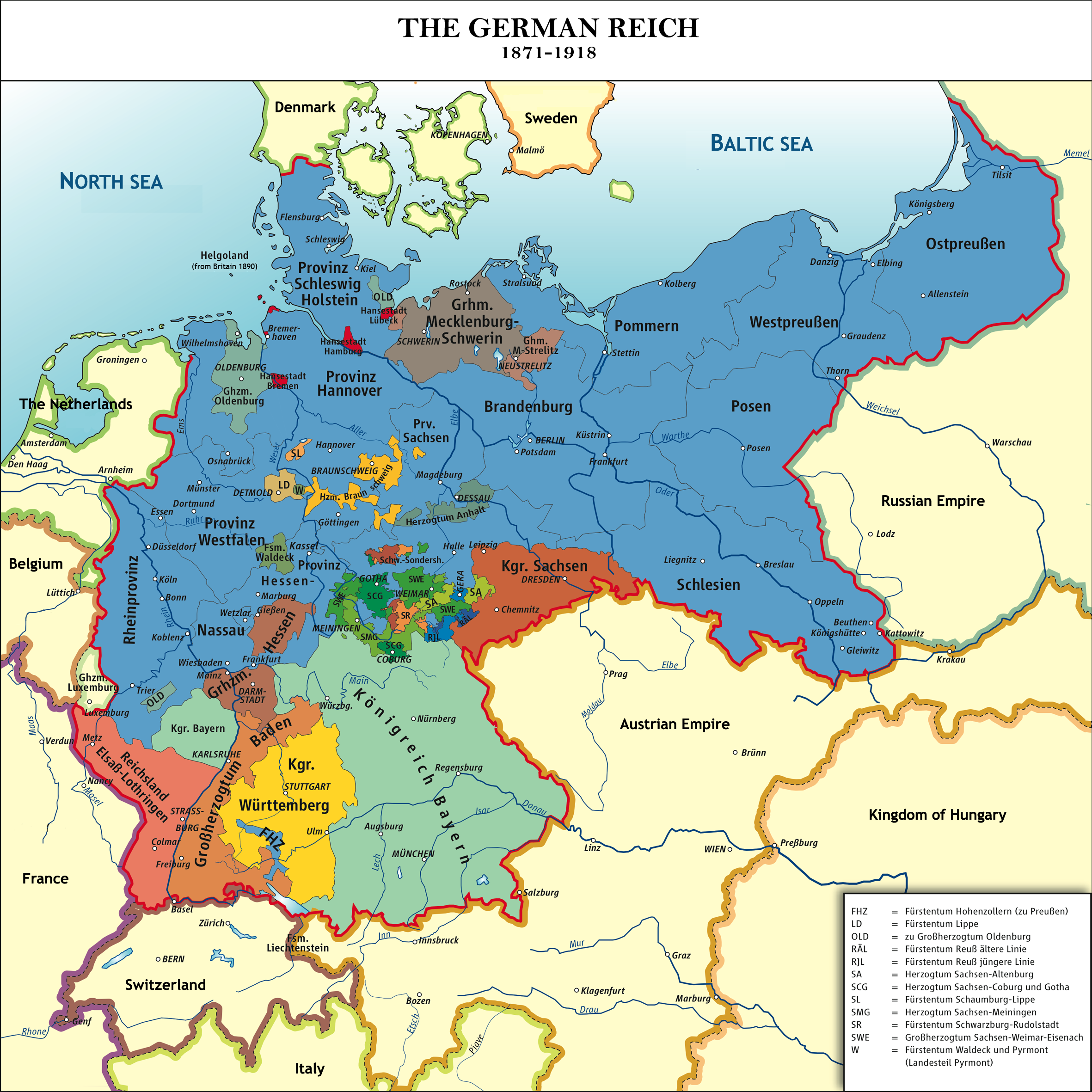
In the German Empire, 1871–1918, Saxony occupied a central position geographically.

Historically also including most of Hesse, parts of Franconia and the south of Lower Saxony, the region is described as an area south of the linguistic Benrath line where Central German dialects were spoken. It ranked for centuries as one of the most advanced areas in Germany, a centre of both the Protestant Reformation and the 19th-century Industrial Revolution. Large parts of the area were once governed by one of the branches of the House of Wettin, with the exception of Anhalt and Reuss and, depending on the geographical definition, the Electorate of Hesse. They, thus, were dynastically in one or the other way linked to the Electorate of Saxony, at that time a major power in the German Empire. Starting from the 19th century, Prussia successively gained control over the northern parts of Central Germany.

=== 19th century until World War II ===
Until World War II, this area was seen as the middle of Germany due to it lying approximately midway between Aachen and Königsberg. The Middle German Chemical Triangle was the central region of the three main German industrial areas between the Ruhr and Upper Silesia. In 1929 the Free State of Prussia and the Holy See agreed in the Prussian Concordat to combine several Catholic dioceses to form the new Middle German Ecclesiastical Province, spreading over eastern Westphalia, northern Hesse, most of Thuringia, today's Saxony-Anhalt and small parts of Saxony. During the Yalta Conference it was suggested as part of the Roosevelt Plan to create a central German state which would have combined roughly the areas formerly covered by the Saxon states of central Germany.

After 1945, when Germany lost its eastern territories, most of middle Germany fell into the Soviet Zone of occupation, becoming Germany's new east, which is why the 1949-founded German Democratic Republic (GDR) is often referred to as East Germany.

For decades until Chancellor Willy Brandt started his Ostpolitik in 1969, official West German usage spoke of "Central Germany" to denote the German Democratic Republic. The term was used by both the Christian Democratic Union and the Social Democratic Party of Germany, and by a large number of West German residents who had been expelled from the eastern provinces, who held a wide range of political views.

=== Post-reunification ===
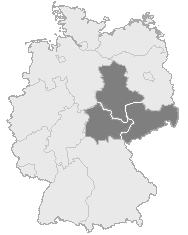
German states of Saxony, Thuringia and Saxony-Anhalt

After the 1990 German reunification, activists (e.g. Aktion Mitteldeutschland e.V.) claimed that the larger Leipzig–Halle area would benefit from asserting an economic identity, separate from the other more rural new states of former East Germany. The use of the term "Central Germany" was meant to underline its location in Central Europe and to recall the industrial glory of the area in former times. Mainly it is used in business and the media.

In 1991, the states of Saxony, Saxony-Anhalt, and Thuringia founded the public regional broadcaster Mitteldeutscher Rundfunk (Middle German Broadcasting), a member of the ARD network. Private companies located in the area of Leipzig, Halle and Dessau often use the term "Central Germany", as do the Evangelical Church in Central Germany and some sports competitions, such as the Mitteldeutsche Meisterschaften (Central German Championships).

The Central German Metropolitan Region comprises a regional development zone in the European METREX network (see below).

Although most methods for determining the geographical center of Germany result in a point in "Central Germany" (for example Niederdorla in western Thuringia), the three-state area also comprises Görlitz, the easternmost town in Germany, which lies on the border with Poland. Arguably, this eastern part, although part of the state of Saxony, is not part of the central German cultural region, as historically, the Lusatia region has its own history and traditions (see i.a. the Lusatian League), being closely linked to Bohemia. The same is true for Magdeburg and the areas surrounding it (i.e. the areas north of Anhalt) as they neither belong to the central German dialect group nor do they have a close cultural connection with the more southern parts, they were traditionally connected to Brandenburg and Prussia.

== Cultural significance ==
Central Germany has played a crucial role in the development of German culture and identity. Already in medieval times, the region laid at the crossroads of two major trade routes in central Europe, the Via Regia and the Via Imperii which intersected at Leipzig, which made the region economically important. The region was the starting point of reformation in Germany and the bible translation by Luther was created here. The language used by Luther in his translation serves as a major source for the written modern standard German. Johann Sebastian Bach was born and worked in the region. Furthermore, the region played an important role during the period of enlightenment. It is the place where Goethe and Schiller spent their most productive years (see: Weimar Classicism). The first European porcelain was invented at Meissen by Johann Friedrich Böttger.

The area has also been one of the regions with the earliest development of industrialisation in Germany and looks back to a long tradition of industry culture. Already in 1839, the Leipzig-Dresden railway was opened, the first long-distance railway in Germany. Saxony became an early home of the German labour movement and social democracy (General German Workers' Association). Karl Marx received his PhD degree from Jena University as the intellectual environment here was more liberal and open than in the Prussia-controlled Rhineland or even Berlin where his ideas had been refused. Germany's first democratic constitution, the Weimar Constitution of 1919, was deliberated and enacted in the city of Weimar. The city had intentionally been chosen as a meeting place at the center ("the heart") of Germany and as a symbol of German culture.

=== UNESCO World Heritage Sites ===
Central Germany is home to several UNESCO World Heritage Sites.

- Medieval city, Collegiate Church and Castle Quedlinburg
- Luthergedenkstätten
- Dessau-Wörlitz Gartenreich (Dessau-Wörlitz Garden Realm)
- Bauhaus (modernist school of architecture and design)
- Naumburg Cathedral
- Wartburg castle
- Classical Weimar
- Ore Mountain Mining Region
- Old Synagoge (Erfurt)
- Nebra sky disk (enlisted in the UNESCO Memory of the World Programme)

== Administrative structure ==
Present central Germany is part of three German federal states: Saxony, Saxony-Anhalt and Thuringia. A large part of the region is part of the Central German Metropolitan Region which comprises a regional development zone in the European METREX network. As of 2014 it includes major cities in Thuringia and Saxony-Anhalt, as well as the "Saxon triangle" of cities that set up the organization in 1994 (Leipzig, Halle, Dresden and Chemnitz-Zwickau).

== Examples of use ==
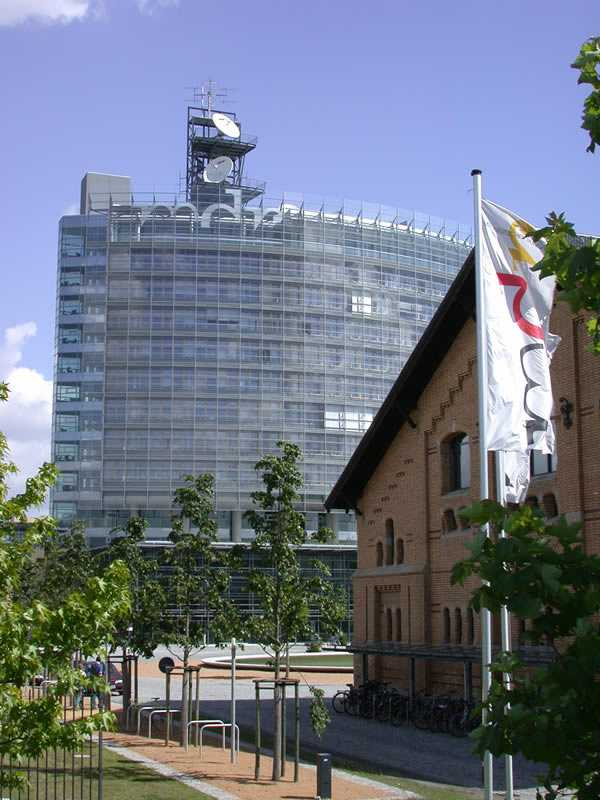
MDR (Mitteldeutscher Rundfunk) headquarters, Leipzig

- Central German Metropolitan Region (seven cities in Saxony, Thuringia and Saxony-Anhalt)
- Mitteldeutscher Rundfunk (Saxony, Thuringia and Saxony-Anhalt)
- Mitteldeutsche Zeitung, Central German Newspaper (Halle/southern Saxony-Anhalt only)
- Mitteldeutsches Chemiedreieck (Halle, Merseburg and Bitterfeld in S.-Anhalt; Leipzig and Schkeuditz in Saxony)
- Evangelical Church in Central Germany (Thuringia, most of Saxony-Anhalt, some of Saxony, some of Brandenburg – see all German Evangelical churches)
- S-Bahn Mitteldeutschland, a rapid transit and regional rail system
- Central German football championship (1902–1933: modern-day Saxony, Thuringia, Saxony-Anhalt with exception of the northern parts; plus Duderstadt, Neustadt bei Coburg and others)
- Mitteldeutscher Basketball Club (Weißenfels in Saxony-Anhalt)
- Chemie Volley Mitteldeutschland, a volleyball club based in Spergau in the district Saalekreis, Saxony-Anhalt, Germany

== See also ==
- East Central German dialects
