= Central German Metropolitan Region =

Coordinates: 51°N 13°E

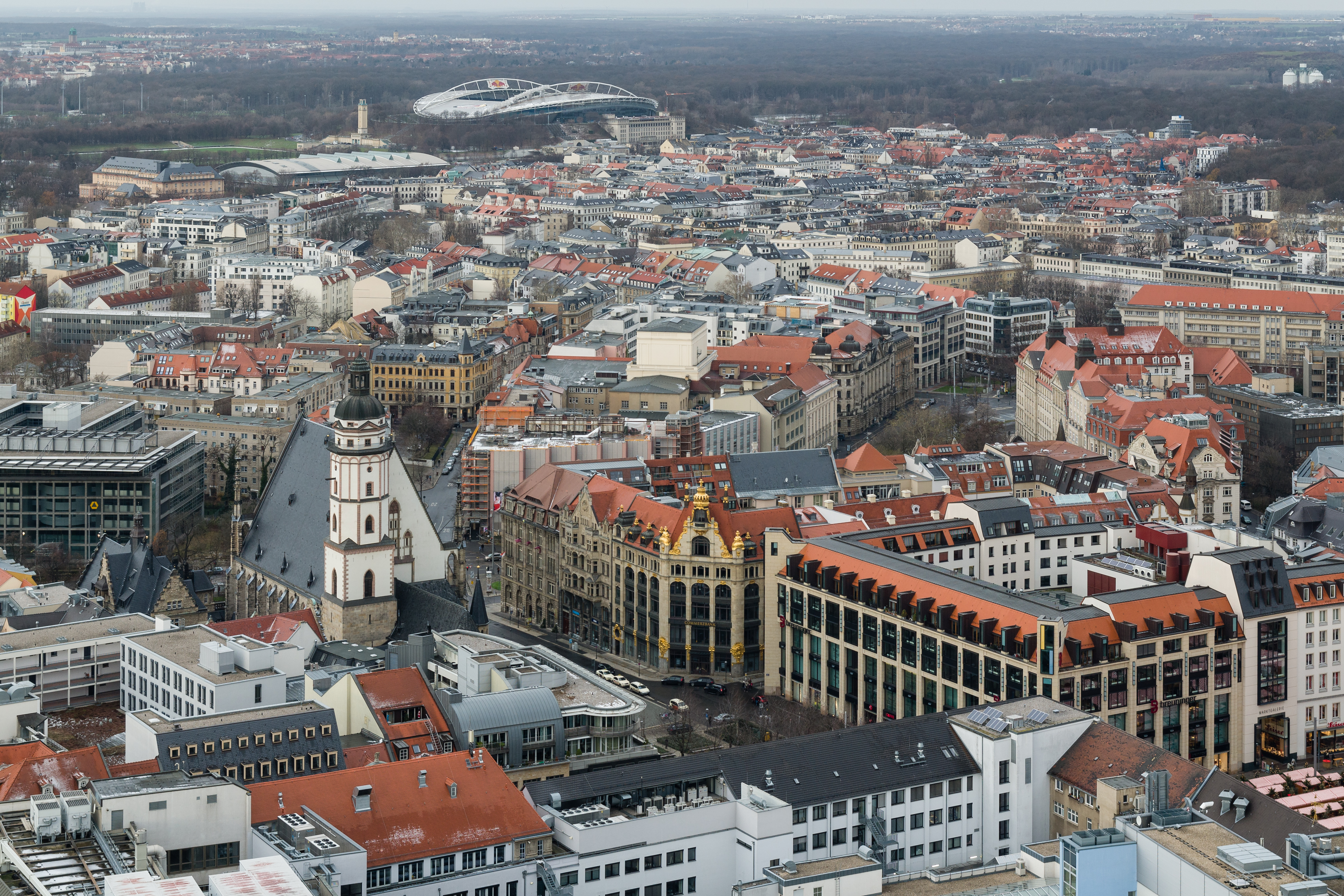
- Leipzig is the largest city in metropolitan area

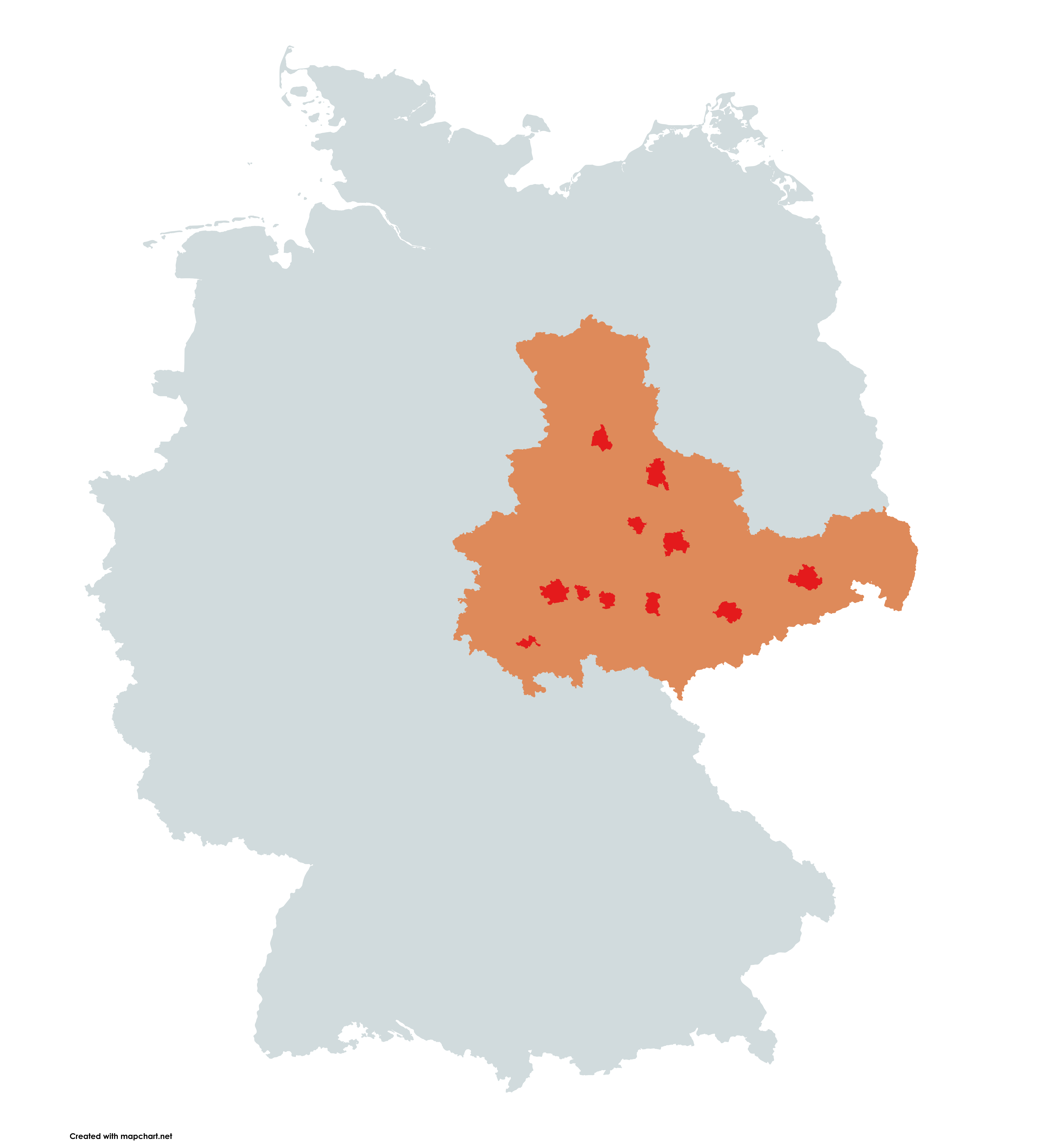
- Location of Central German Metropolitan Region in Germany
- Country: Germany
- States: Saxony; Saxony-Anhalt; Thuringia

Area
  - Metro: 9,718 km^{2} (3,752 sq mi)

Population
  - Metro: 2,411,051
  - Metro density: 248.1/km^{2} (642.6/sq mi)

GDP
  - Metro: €102.532 billion (2021)
- Time zone: UTC+1 (CET)
- Website: www.mitteldeutschland.com/en/page/wirtschaft

The Central German Metropolitan Region (German: Metropolregion Mitteldeutschland) is one of the officially established metropolitan regions in Germany. It is centered on the major cities of Leipzig and Halle, extending over Central German parts of the states of Saxony-Anhalt, Thuringia and Saxony. The Central German metropolitan region is the only one located entirely within the former East Germany.

The "region" is not actually a metropolitan area in the geographic sense of the word as an agglomeration of nearby urban areas, rather it is a registered association, the Europäische Metropolregion Mitteldeutschland e.V. whose membership is composed of towns, cities, municipalities, and companies, colleges and chambers of commerce in the central German geographic area, whose representatives vote upon new members. For example, Jena joined the Metropolitan Region in 2009, while Dresden and Magdeburg left in 2013.

The registered association owns the management company Metropolregion Mitteldeutschland Management GmbH. As such it forms a planning and marketing framework for the region while retaining the legal independence of its members.

== History ==
=== Saxon Triangle (Sachsendreieck) ===
In 1997 the German Ministerial Conference for Regional Development declared the 'Saxon Triangle' (Dresden, Leipzig/Halle, and Chemnitz) as the seventh of 11 metropolitan regions in Germany.

=== Central German Metropolitan Region ===
Out of this initial conference the Initiativkreis Europäische Metropolregionen in Deutschland IKM (Initiative Group for European Metropolitan Regions in Germany) was formed in 2001 which developed the concept of the Central German Metropolitan Region in 2012.

In 2013, Dresden and Magdeburg dropped out of the association and the membership has been focused more on cities and towns around Leipzig and Halle.

== Members ==
The largest of the eight member cities are Leipzig in Saxony and Halle (Saale) in Saxony-Anhalt.

=== Member cities ===
The member cities have changed over time and the current member cities are as follows:

- Leipzig (570,000 inhabitants)
- Chemnitz (245,500)
- Halle (Saale) (236,000)
- Jena (105,000)
- Gera (99,000)
- Zwickau (97,000)
- Dessau-Roßlau (87,000)

Except for Zwickau and Wittenberg, all towns hold the status of an independent city (i.e. municipalities which are also counties). Dresden and Magdeburg are no longer part of the organization. Some surrounding districts have also joined the association.

=== Counties ===
6 districts (German: Landkreis, similar to counties) are also members of the CGMR:

- Altenburger Land, Thuringia (90.650 inhabitants)
- Burgenlandkreis, Saxony-Anhalt (181.968)
- Landkreis Leipzig, Saxony (258.008)
- Landkreis Mansfeld-Südharz, Saxony-Anhalt (138.013)
- Saalekreis, Saxony-Anhalt (185.494)
- Landkreis Wittenberg, Saxony-Anhalt (126.815)

=== Non-governmental partners ===
Apart from these administrative units, the metropolitan region publishes a list of industry partners which are official members of the regions planning framework.

=== Demographics ===
All towns and cities in the so-called metropolitan region suffered population decline after German reunification; however in recent years the populations of Leipzig and Halle have been increasing again. Other urban areas, such as Dessau-Roslau are however still declining.

== Transport ==
The region contains important trade corridors in central Europe, including the routes of several highways of the International E-road network as well as two major German expressways (A9 Munich–Berlin and A14 Dresden–Wismar). Leipzig-Halle is a major railway hub along the Berlin–Palermo railway axis which is part of the Trans-European high-speed rail network. Other railway mainlines connect it with Dresden, Frankfurt, Frankfurt Airport and Prague. Leipzig-Halle Airport serves as the main airport of the region. It is the second largest freight airport in Germany and a hub of DHL's express service.

The metropolitan region association has set up a working group on traffic and mobility, the members of which are delegated from various regional stakeholders, i.e. state ministries, cities, counties and public transport associations.

== Gallery ==
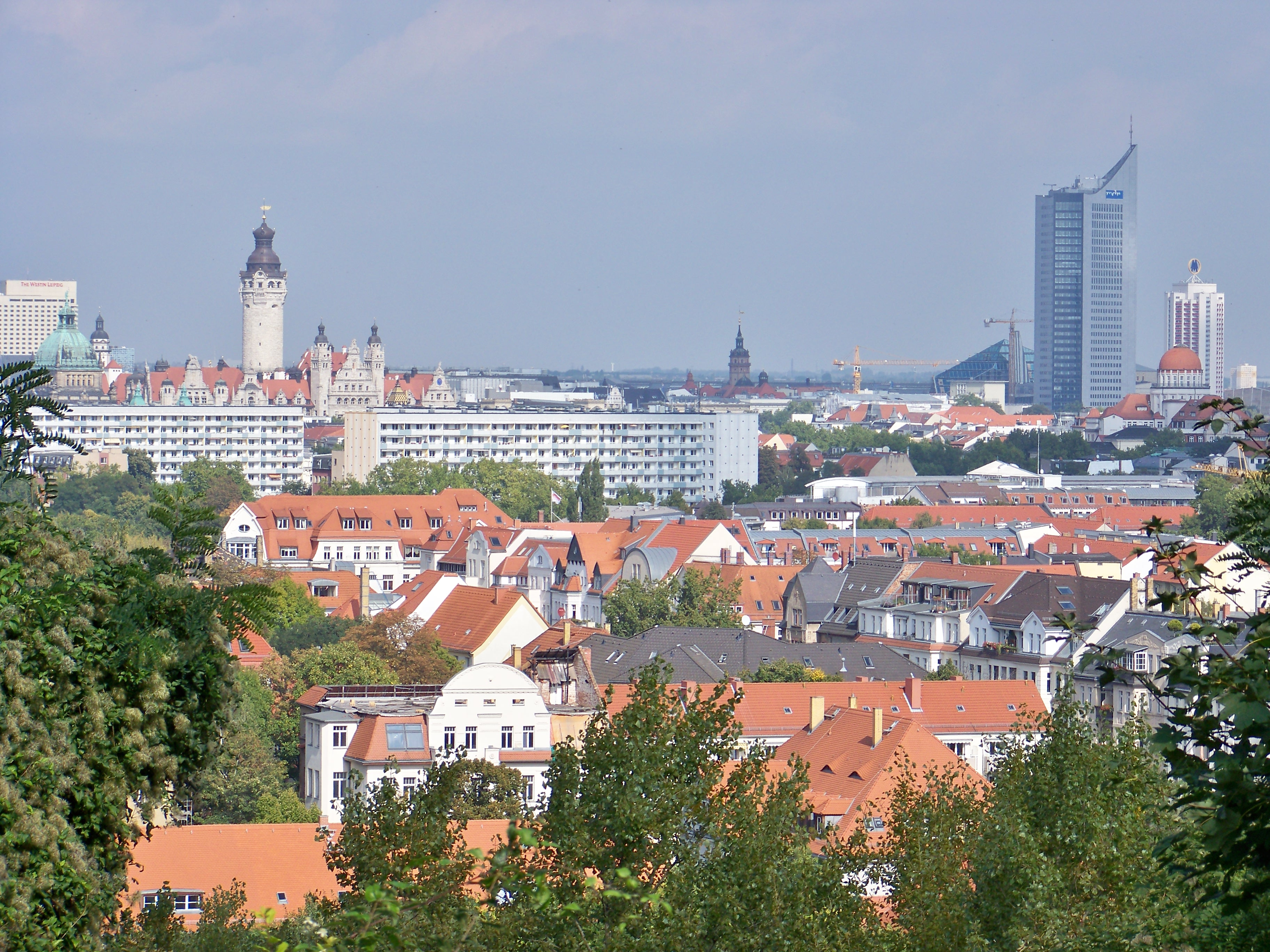
Leipzig is the heart of the Central German Metropolitan Region and is nicknamed "Hypezig".

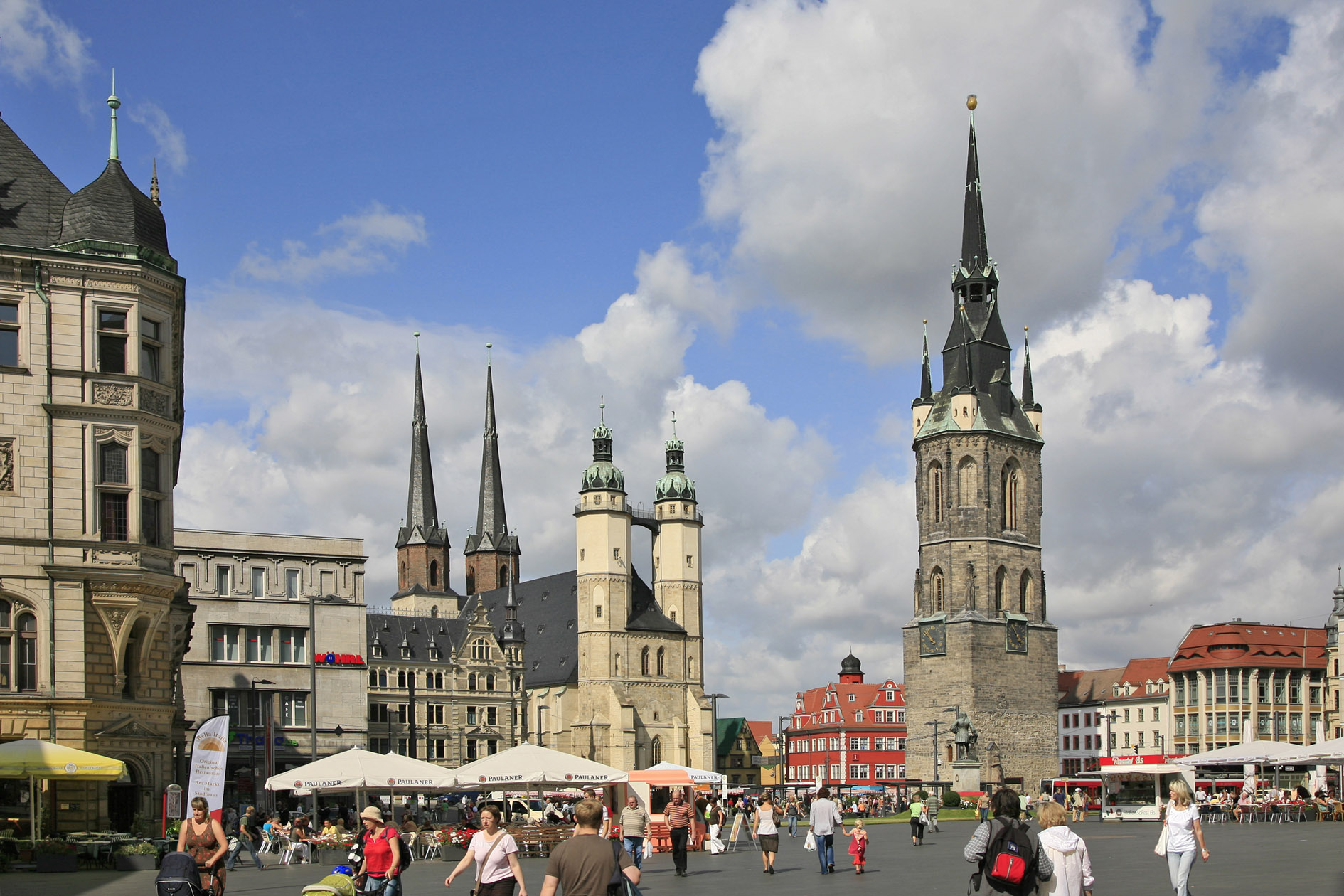
Halle (Saale), biggest city in Saxony-Anhalt and seat of the Martin Luther University of Halle-Wittenberg

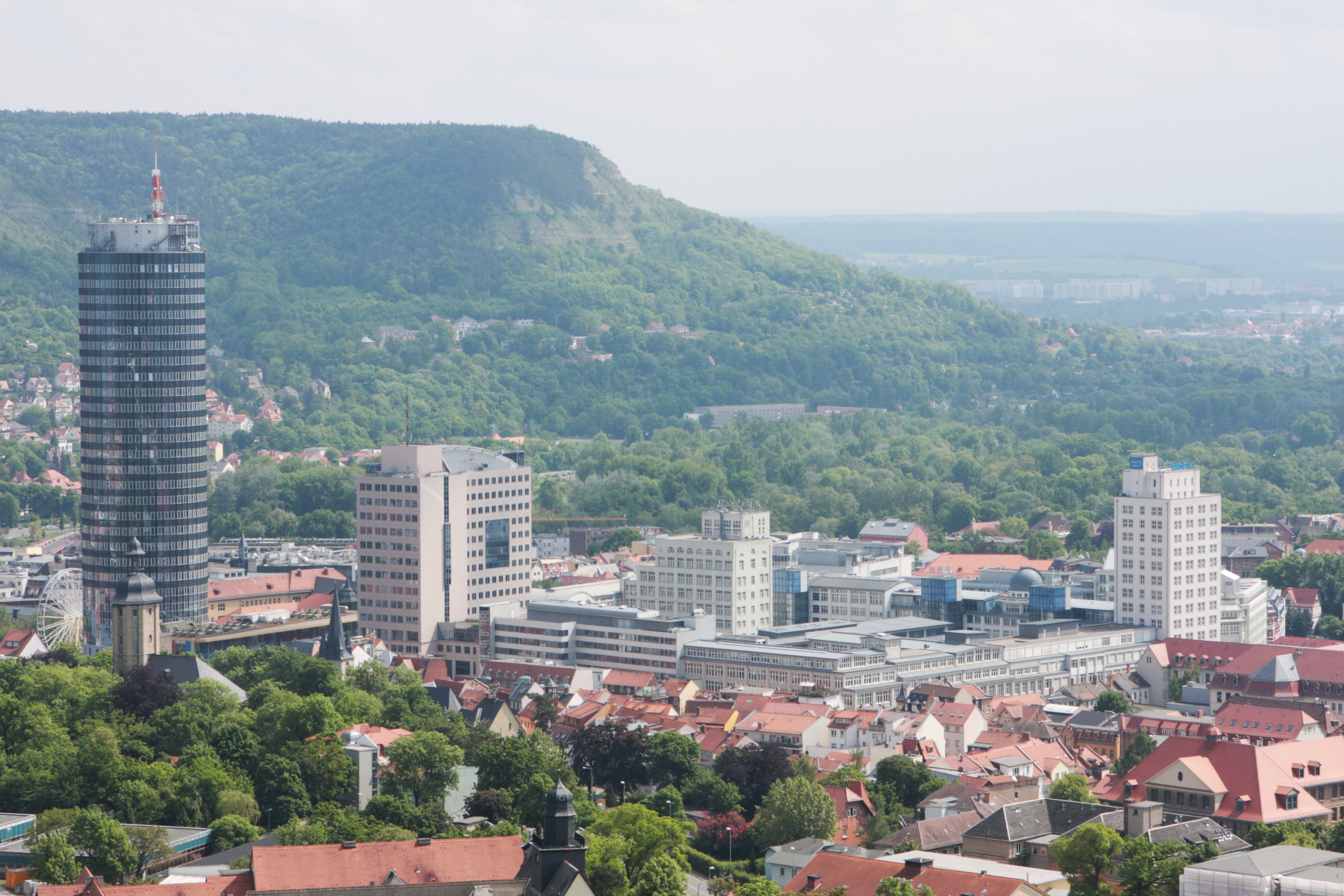
University town of Jena and the second largest city in Thuringia

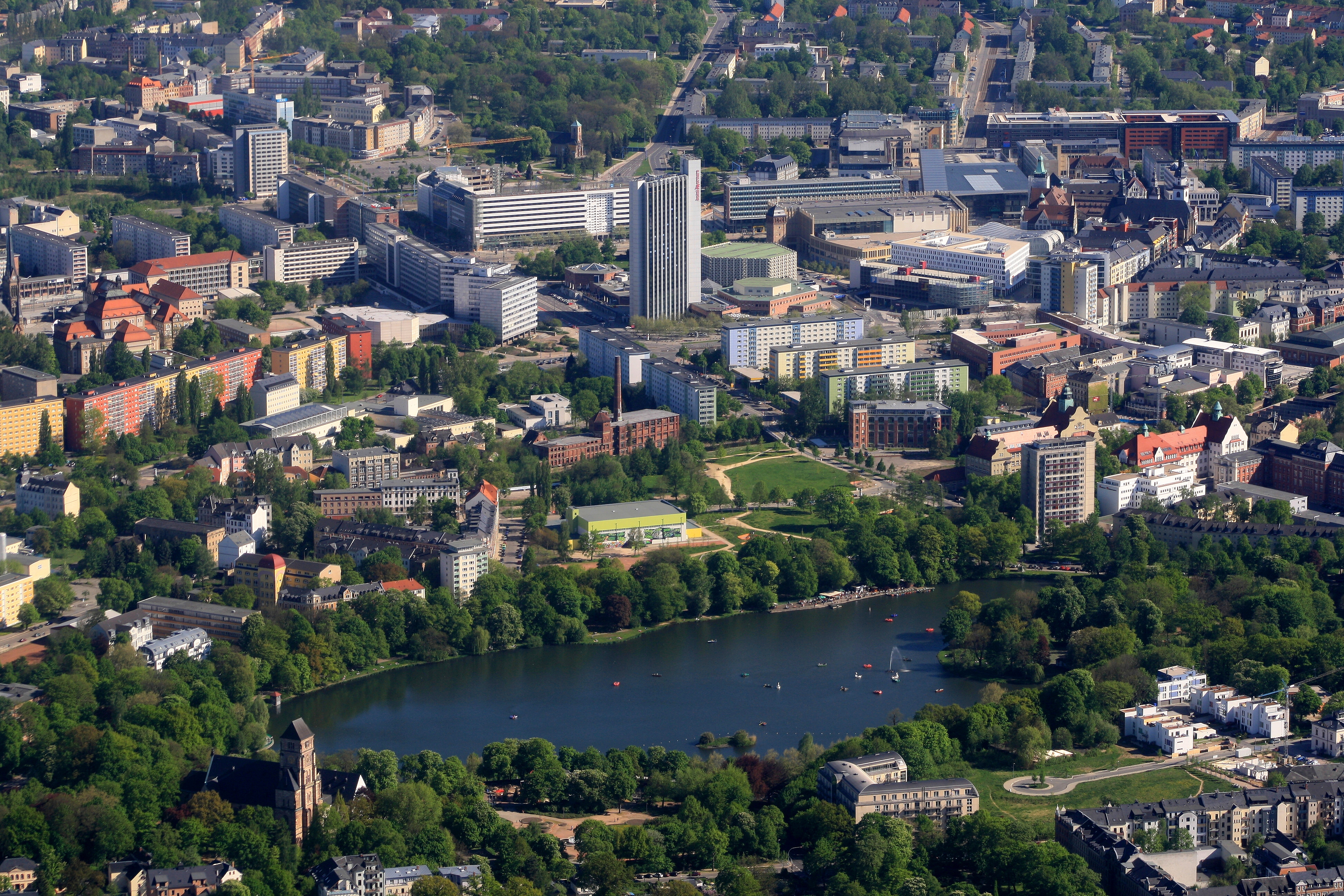
View over Chemnitz. The city is among the top ten German cities in terms of economic growth rate.

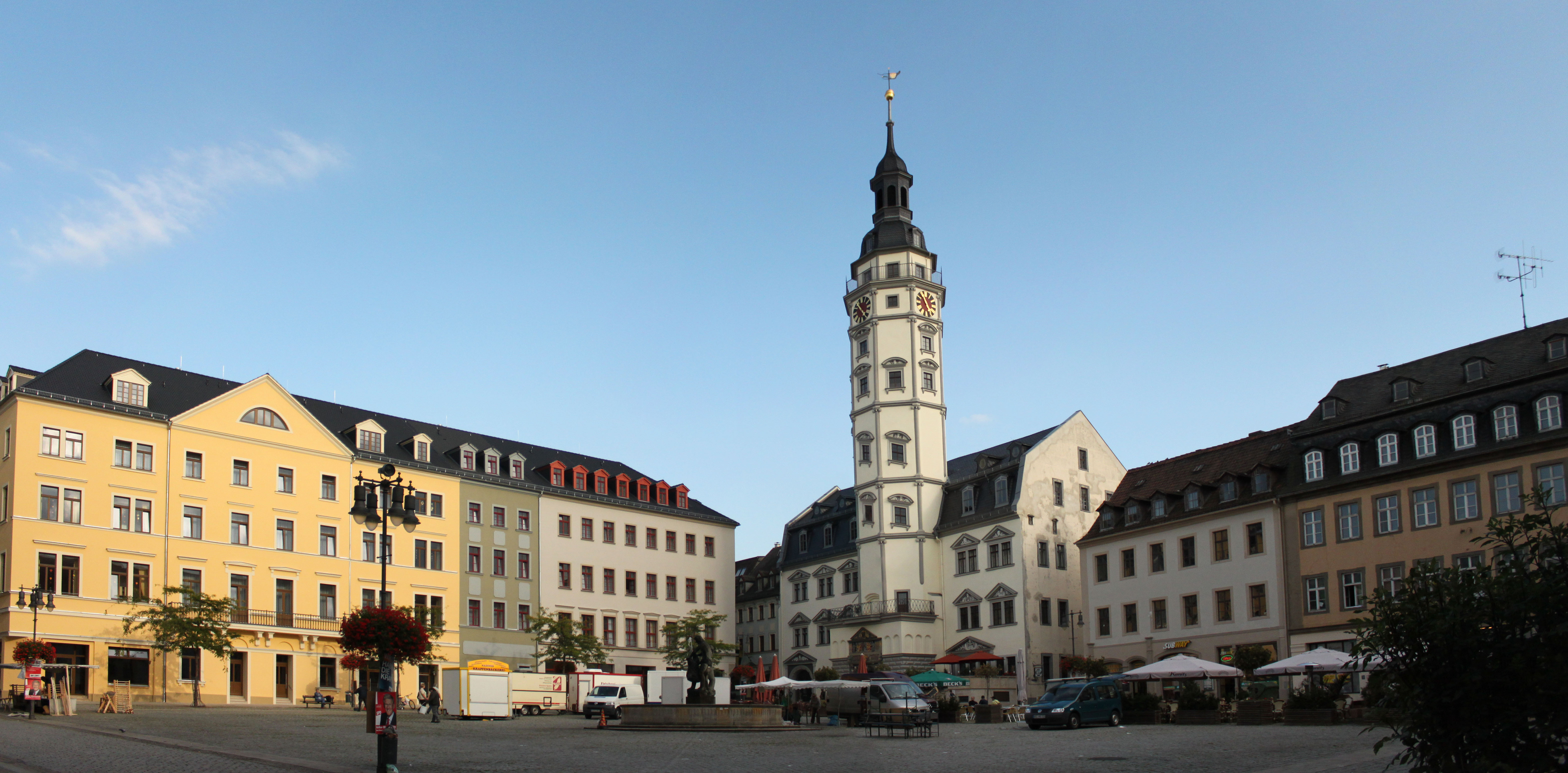
Gera market

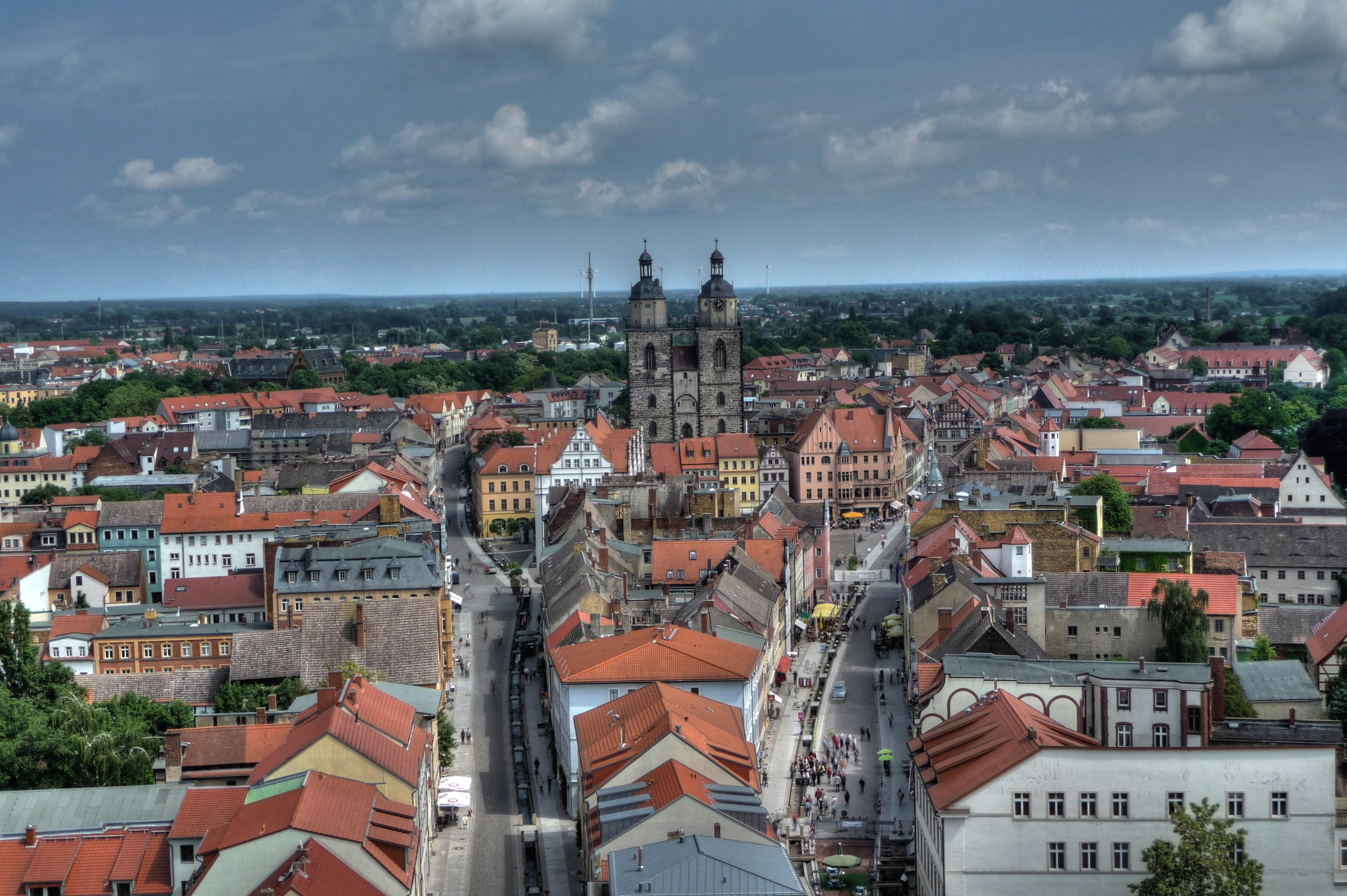
View over downtown Wittenberg in Wittenberg district

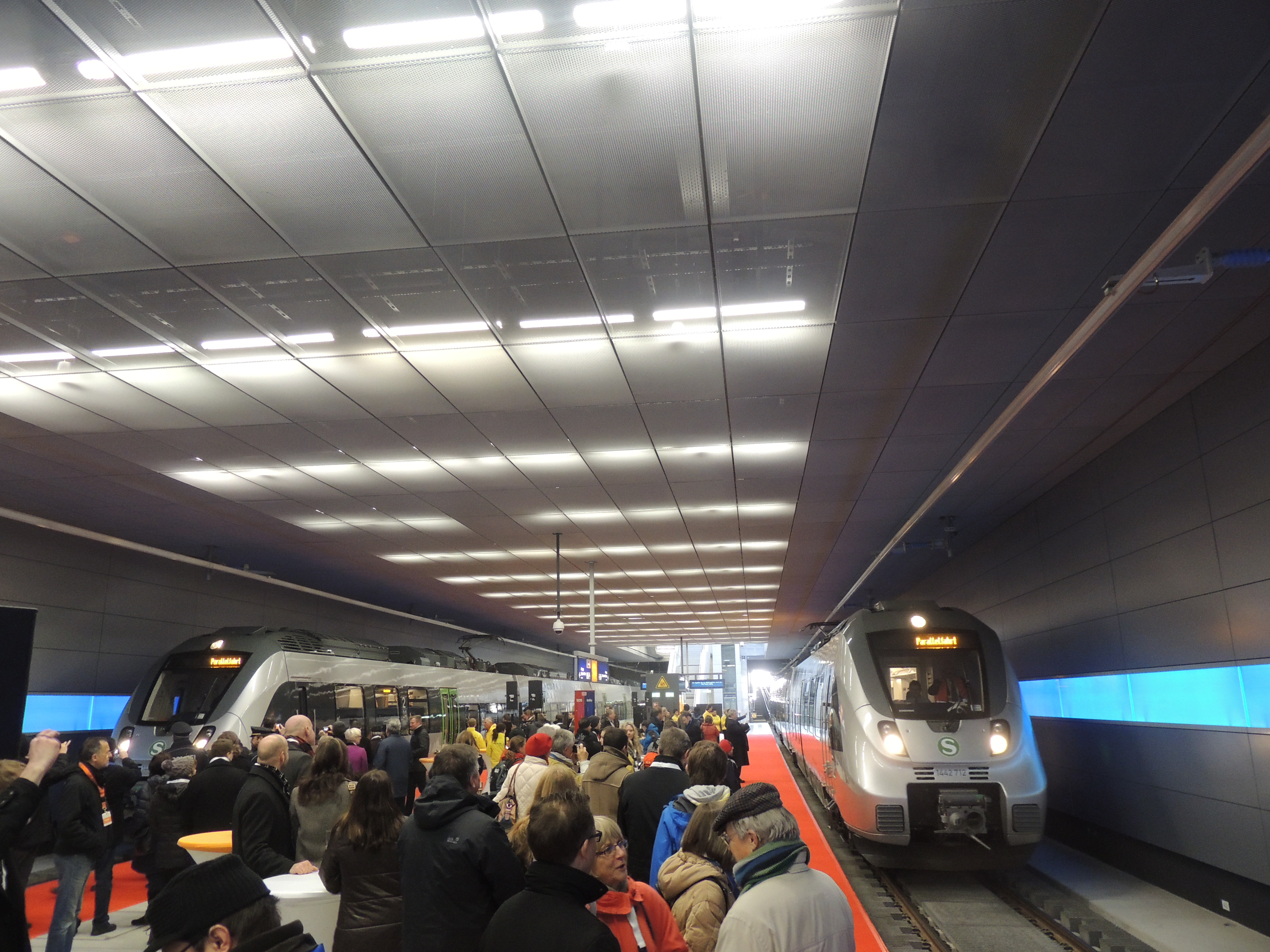
Leipzig City Tunnel forms the centerpiece of an extensive S-Bahn network serving 1.2 million people in the Leipzig/Halle metropolitan area.
