= Sankt Goar line =

German isogloss line

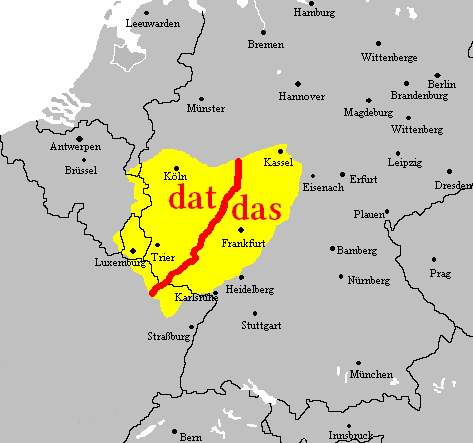
The Sankt Goar line.

In German linguistics, the Sankt Goar line, das–dat line, or was–wat line is an isogloss in Europe in the areas of Belgium, Germany and Luxembourg. It separates the dialects to the north, which have a t in the words dat (English that) and wat (English what), from the dialects to the south (including standard German), which have an s: das, was. The line runs from North-East to South-West and crosses the river Rhine at the town of Sankt Goar.

== See also ==
- High German consonant shift
- Rhenish fan
