= Isogloss =

Geographic boundary of a certain linguistic feature

Isoglosses on the Faroe Islands

An isogloss, also called a heterogloss, is the geographic boundary of a certain linguistic feature, such as the pronunciation of a vowel, the meaning of a word, or the use of some morphological or syntactic feature. Isoglosses are a subject of study in dialectology, in which they demarcate the differences between regional dialects of a language; in areal linguistics, in which they represent the extent of borrowing of features between languages in contact with one another; and in the wave model of historical linguistics, in which they indicate the similarities and differences between members of a language family.

In dialect geography, isogloss may refer either to the area in which a feature predominates or to the boundary line drawn on a map to enclose that area. Isoglosses of different linguistic phenomena rarely coincide completely; by crossing and interweaving they can form intricate patterns on dialect maps, and transition zones are common.

Major dialects are typically demarcated by bundles of isoglosses, such as the Benrath line that distinguishes High German from the other West Germanic languages and the La Spezia–Rimini Line that divides the Northern Italian dialect area from Central and Southern Italian varieties. However, an individual isogloss may or may not be coterminous with a language border. For example, the front-rounding of /y/ cuts across France and Germany, while the /y/ is absent from Italian and Spanish words that are cognates with the /y/-containing French words.

Similar to an isogloss, an isograph is a distinguishing feature of a writing system. Both concepts are also used in historical linguistics.

== Types ==
Depending on the kind of linguistic feature mapped, more specific terms are sometimes used:

- isophone – an isogloss for a phonetic or phonological feature
- isolex – an isogloss for a lexical item
- isomorph – an isogloss for a morphological feature
- isoseme – an isogloss for a particular word meaning

== Methodology ==
Because linguistic variation is often gradual, isoglosses are a cartographic abstraction: they summarize the distribution of a selected feature and may be drawn as approximate lines or treated as marking broader transition zones, depending on how the data are interpreted. Quantitative approaches in dialectology (often grouped under dialectometry) use aggregate comparisons across many features to identify patterns of spatial similarity that may not be captured by any single isogloss.

== Etymology ==
The term isogloss (Ancient Greek ἴσος ísos 'equal, similar' and γλῶσσα glōssa 'tongue, dialect, language') is inspired by the iso- terminology of the natural sciences (such as isotherm and isobar), in which contour lines are used to represent equal values across space. In linguistics, however, an isogloss separates rather than connects points. Consequently, it has been proposed for the term heterogloss (ἕτερος héteros 'other') to be used instead.

== Examples ==
=== Centum–satem isogloss ===
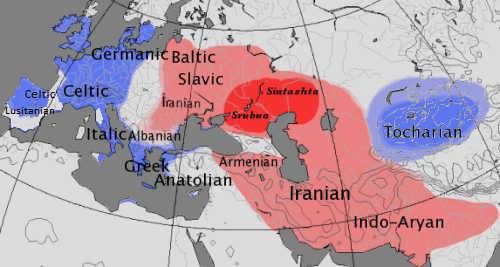
The Centum-Satem isogloss

The centum–satem isogloss of the Indo-European language family relates to the different evolution of the dorsal consonants of Proto-Indo-European (PIE). In the standard reconstruction, three series of dorsals are recognised:

Labiovelars:	*kʷ,	*gʷ,	*gʷʰ
Velars:	*k,	*g,	*gʰ
Palatals:	*ḱ,	*ǵ,	*ǵʰ

In some branches (for example Greek, Italic and Germanic), the palatals merged with the velars: PIE *keup- "tremble (inwardly)" became Latin cupiō "desire" and *ḱm̥tom "hundred" became Latin centum (pronounced [ˈkɛntũː]); but *kʷo- "interrogative pronoun" became quō "how? where?". They are known as centum branches, named after the Latin word for hundred.

In other branches (for example, Balto-Slavic and Indo-Iranian), the labiovelars merged with the velars: PIE *keup- became Vedic Sanskrit kopáyati "shaken" and *kʷo- became Avestan kō "who?"; but *ḱm̥tom became Avestan satəm. They are known as satem branches, after the Avestan word for hundred.

Since the Balto-Slavic family, the Indo-Iranian family, and the other satem families are spoken in adjacent geographic regions, they can be grouped by an isogloss: a geographic line separating satem branches on one side from centum branches on the other.

=== North–Midland isogloss (American English) ===
A major isogloss in American English has been identified as the North–Midland isogloss, which demarcates numerous linguistic features, including the Northern Cities vowel shift: regions north of the line (including Western New York; Cleveland, Ohio; lower Michigan; northern Illinois; and eastern Wisconsin) have the shift, while regions south of the line (including Pennsylvania, central and southern Ohio, and most of Indiana) do not.

=== Northwest Semitic ===
A feature of the ancient Northwest Semitic languages is w becoming y at the beginning of a word. Thus, in Proto-Semitic and subsequent non-Northwest Semitic languages and dialects, the root letters for a word for "child" were w-l-d. However, in the ancient Northwest Semitic languages, the word was y-l-d, with w- > y-.

Similarly, Proto-Semitic ā becomes ō in the Canaanite dialects of Northwest Semitic. Within the Aramaic languages and dialects of Northwest Semitic, the historic ā is preserved. Thus, an ancient Northwest Semitic language whose historic ā became ō can be classed as part of the Canaanite branch of Northwest Semitic.

== Isographs ==
Just as there are distinguishing features of related languages, there are also distinguishing features of related scripts.

For example, a distinguishing feature of the Iron Age Old Hebrew script is that the letters bet, dalet, ayin and resh do not have an open head, but contemporary Aramaic has open-headed forms. Similarly, the bet of Old Hebrew has a distinctive stance (it leans to the right), but the bet of the Aramaic and Phoenician scripts series has a different stance (in both, it leans to the left).

In 2006, Christopher Rollston suggested using the term isograph to designate a feature of the script that distinguishes it from a related script series, such as a feature that distinguishes the script of Old Hebrew from Old Aramaic and Phoenician.

== See also ==
- Areal feature – Linguistic feature arising through language contact rather than common descent
- Dialect – Variant of a language
- Dialectology – Scientific study of linguistic dialect
- Dialect continuum – Geographic range of dialects that vary more strongly at the distant ends
- Cultural boundary – Geographical area associated with a specific cultural orientation
- Language border – Geolinguistic boundary between mutually intelligible speech communities
- Joret line – Isogloss in northern France
- Sprachbund – Languages similar by contact, not origin
- Uerdingen line – Isogloss in German dialectology

== Bibliography ==
- Chambers, J.K.; Trudgill, Peter (28 December 1998). Dialectology. Cambridge Textbooks in Linguistics (2nd ed.). Cambridge University Press. ISBN 0-521-59646-7.
- Kabatek, Johannes (2023). "What is an isogloss?". Energeia. Online Journal for Linguistics, Language Philosophy and History of Linguistics. VIII: 55–81. doi:10.55245/energeia.2023.004.
- Maiden, Martin; Parry, Mair, eds. (1997). The Dialects of Italy. London and New York: Routledge. ISBN 0-415-11104-8.
- Woodard, Roger D. (31 May 2004). The Cambridge Encyclopedia of the World's Ancient Languages. New York: Cambridge University Press. ISBN 0-521-56256-2.
