= Modern Dutch =

Dutch language since around 1500

- Nieuwnederlands
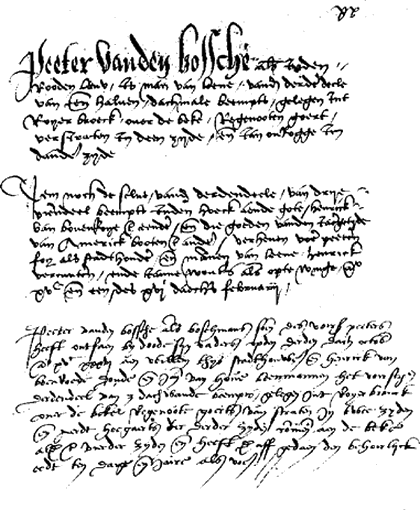
- Examples of Dutch notarial act from 1526 to 1536.
- Region: Low Countries
- Era: 16th century–present
- Language family: Indo-European: Germanic; West Germanic; Istvaeonic; Low Franconian; Modern Dutch
- Early forms: Frankish: Old Dutch; Middle Dutch
- Writing system: Latin

Language codes
- ISO 639-3: –
- Glottolog: None

Modern Dutch (Dutch: Nieuwnederlands [ˌniu̯ˈneː.dər.lɑnts]) is the term for variety of Dutch spoken and written since around the 1500s, this is to distinguish it from the previous phases of the languages, Middle Dutch and Old Dutch. The term Early Modern Dutch has been applied to the Dutch spoken in the 16th and 17th centuries.

== Lexicography ==
The vocabulary of Modern Dutch up to 1920 is best documented in the book on the shelf Woordenboek der Nederlandsche Taal. In short, WNT is a project that began in the 19th century and was only completed in the early 21st century. This dictionary is the largest dictionary in the world. Besides lemmas (word entries) it also contains the sources (first use) of words.

== 16th century ==
Modern Dutch differs from Middle Dutch in its gradual standardization, grammatical simplification, and different sound developments.

In the 16th century, economic and political power shifted forever from the first and second estates to the third estate, the bourgeoisie. This shift and some other socio-political, cultural and religious factors promote the position of the vernacular. Here are some of the factors:

1. Inquisitie en Tachtigjarige Oorlog – the inquisition and the Eighty Years' War caused the emigration of about 10% (175,000 people) of the population of the southern Netherlands. About 115,000 people moved directly north. Others moved to Britain and Germany, or via northern countries. This migration caused significant language mixing. In addition, the cultural and economic center shifted from Brabant (Antwerp) to the Holland (Amsterdam), which would bear full fruit in the coming century.
2. Hervorming – the religious reform is aimed at reaching all levels of society. Northern Germany, Flanders, and Brabant pastors spread the new doctrine in the north. They consider it important for them to be able to read or listen to the Bible in their own language. The first Bible translations showed quite a lot of German influence. The reformation enriched the Dutch language with the words dankoffer, evenbeeld, heiland, huichelen, kruisigen, nederig, ijver, onderrichten, etc., and also contributed to the spread of the pronoun zich in written language.
3. Humanisme – the ideas of humanism also contributed greatly to the new attitude towards everyday language. Hendrik Laurensz Spiegel expressed his position towards the Netherlands in his work Twe-spraack vande Nederduitsche letterkunst, published in 1584. He said, "According to them [the speakers], Dutch is the mother tongue of all languages, but Dutch is neglected. Moreover, they considered Dutch to be too simple. They used Latin, which was considered 'superior' as an example of a language because of its complicated grammar. They also supported a pure Dutch language, where loanwords from French should be eliminated". Their concrete efforts in this regard have fostered national awareness and glorification of the mother tongue.

== 17th century ==
The concern for one's own language that began in the 16th century continued into the 17th century, and this concern was manifested in all areas. Linguistically conscious writers such as Hooft and Vondel spoke freely about the state of the Dutch language. Although deflection in spoken language can already be observed in the late Middle Ages, Hooft, for example, still seems to promote the Latin model. At the same time he attempted to purify the Dutch language from words that he thought sounded too strange. For words like ingenieur, controleur, parlement, conciërge, he suggested as alternative Dutch words such as vernufteling, tegenrolhouder, pleithof, stadhuisavenaar. Other events have encouraged or hindered the standardization of Dutch.

=== Peace of Münster ===
In 1648, the Peace of Münster was concluded. This meant the end of the Eighty Years' War between the Netherlands and the Spanish, but also the separation of the Northern and Southern Netherlands. Therefore, Dutch would later develop in the north. However, it is known that Dutch originated in Brabant (see 16th century migration).

=== Confirmation of status ===
In 1637, the Statenvertaling (also called the Statenbijbel) was written and distributed. This Statenvertaling is said to be very important for the standardization of the Dutch language. Following the Synod of Dordrecht, they wanted to make a new translation of the Bible which should be very closely related to the original text. Various translators from different Dutch-speaking regions were called in to produce a supra-regional translation that everyone could understand. This resulted in the creation of a new standard language (a mixture of all dialects).

=== Spoken language v. Written language ===
Rules were made for written language to promote standardization. On the other hand, regional dialects continue to develop so that standardization does not occur.

=== North v. South ===
Standardization initially increased in the north. On the other hand, in the south, this was slowed down due to the importance of French on the one hand, but also due to the fact that Protestants were related to Dutch and wanted to recruit people to the detriment of Catholics. Where the latter they opposed Protestants to maintain their identity by rejecting the Dutch language.

== 18th–19th century ==
During the 19th century, due to increasing participation in education and increasing (social) mobility, the standard language is becoming increasingly used as a spoken language by the entire nation and is no longer used only by a small elite. This has several consequences:

- The different dialects, which had developed so far over the centuries that they were often unintelligible to each other, began to move in the same direction as each other.
- The national border between the Netherlands and Germany, created by historical coincidence, is slowly becoming a real language border. The dialects there no longer blend together smoothly, where the dialect continuum is broken.
- The pronunciation of standard language changes because people who first come into contact with standard language through education start using it depiction of words as standard pronunciation. For example, around the 1900s, ancient civilized forms of pronunciation such as mèrel, kèrel, and wèreld disappeared, and today there are forms such as seventig and feertig.

== Flanders ==
In Flanders, the development of the position of Dutch did not run parallel. The nobility, the business community and the bourgeoisie used it there for centuries, until after the World War II, French as the leading standard and administrative language is said to have influenced written and spoken Dutch in Flanders. In 1785, the southern Dutch lawyer and politician Jan Baptist Verlooy wrote to Emperor Joseph II in Vienna to expose the weaknesses of the Dutch language. Two years later his most influential work on this subject was published in the Verhandeling op d’onacht der moederlyke tael in de Nederlanden.

The Dutch dialects in Flanders, where the majority of the population is agricultural, often differ markedly, sometimes even over short distances, a testament to the isolation experienced by villages and towns. Only through the Flemish emancipation, the implementation of language laws, secondary and higher education in the Netherlands, the progress of industrialization and the rise of radio and television gradually changed this. Most of the Flemish population can now easily use Standard Dutch as a written and spoken language. Dutch language in Belgium is slightly different from the standard language spoken in the Netherlands. Until recently, this standard form of the language was often called "Schoon Vlaams", and was mainly influenced by Brabant, especially the Antwerp city dialect as in the 16th century, with many more gallicisms and sentence structures influenced by French.

== See also ==
- History of the Dutch language
