= Final-obstruent devoicing =

Phonological process

Final-obstruent devoicing or terminal devoicing is a systematic phonological process occurring in languages such as Catalan, German, Dutch, Quebec French, Breton, Russian, Polish, Lithuanian, Turkish, and Wolof. In such languages, voiced obstruents in final position (at the end of a word) become voiceless before voiceless consonants and in pausa. The process can be written as *C_{[+ obstruent, +voice]} → C_{[-voice]}/__#.

== Languages with final-obstruent devoicing ==
=== Germanic languages ===
Most modern continental West Germanic languages developed final devoicing, the earliest evidence appearing in Old Dutch around the 9th or 10th century.

- Afrikaans
- Central Franconian (Luxembourgish and Ripuarian)
- Dutch, also Old and Middle Dutch
- High German, also Middle High German (Note: In normalised Middle High German as opposed to modern New High German, devoicing is represented in writing, thus Kriemhilt is the shortened form of Kriemhilde.) (Note: However, final-obstruent devoicing does not occur in Austrian German or Swiss Standard German.)
- Gothic (for fricatives)
- Limburgish
- Low German, also Middle Low German
- Old English (for fricatives, inconsistently for /ɣ/)
- West Frisian. In contrast, North Frisian (and some Low German dialects in North Frisia influenced by it) do not have final devoicing.
- East Frisian

In contrast to other continental West Germanic languages, Eastern Yiddish notably does not alter final voiced sounds; this appears to be a later reversal, most probably under Slavic influence. In its earliest recorded example (Yiddish § Written evidence), it has final-obstruent devoicing (טַק tak instead of tag for 'day'.)

North Germanic languages generally lack devoicing. Norwegian and Swedish do not have final devoicing, and Danish does not even have voiced obstruents that could be devoiced. As in Danish, Icelandic stops are voiceless, but it has voiced fricatives which may also occur word-finally.

Gothic (an East Germanic language) also developed final devoicing independently, but only for fricatives.

=== Romance languages ===
Among the Romance languages, word-final devoicing is common in the Gallo-Romance languages, some of which tend to exhibit strong Frankish influence (itself the ancestor of Old Dutch, above).

- Catalan
- Old French and Middle French. Preserved in certain Modern French inflections such as -if vs. -ive, grand when applying liaison [ɡʁɑ̃t] vs. grande [ɡʁɑ̃d(ə)], but now often regularized. However, dialects maintain word-final devoicing:
  - Canadian French
  - some Belgian French speakers
  - Meridional French, influenced by Catalan and Occitan
- Friulian
- Lombard
- Occitan
- Romansh
- Walloon

Notes

- Romance languages south of the La Spezia-Rimini line as well as standard Italian rarely have words with final voiced consonants for different reasons in their phonological histories, but borrowings from other languages that have a voiced final consonant (like weekend) are not devoiced.
- Portuguese merges [s] and [z] in word-final position (nós and noz are homophones) but has a few words ending with voiced stops like sob. However, some dialects add an epenthetic vowel after word-final voiced stops.
- Romanian, which lies geographically between Hungarian and Slavic-speaking areas, does not have it.

=== Slavic languages ===
Most Slavic languages exhibit final devoicing, but notably standard (Štokavian) Serbo-Croatian, Ukrainian and Upper Sorbian do not.

- Belarusian
- Bulgarian (incomplete)
- Czech
- Macedonian (variable)
- Polish
- Russian
- Rusyn
- Serbo-Croatian (Kajkavian dialects)
- Slovak
- Slovene (variable)
- Lower Sorbian

=== Other Indo-European languages ===
- Albanian – certain dialects, notably the dialects of certain areas of the Berat and Korçë counties, towards the southeast of Albania
- Arbëresh
- Breton
- Latgalian
- Lithuanian
- Persian (half-voiced)
- Yaghnobi

=== Non-Indo-European languages ===
- Azerbaijani (half-voiced in Iranian Azerbaijan)
- Buryat
- Georgian (for stops)
- Indonesian (for stops)
- Kalmyk Oirat (for stops)
- Kazakh (for stops)
- Khmer
- Kyrgyz (for stops)
- Korean (nuanced; see Korean phonology)
- Livonian (fully devoiced or half-voiced)
- Lao
- Malaysian (for stops)
- Maltese
- Modern Javanese (for stops)
- Mongolian
- Thai
- Turkish (for stops, partially)
- Turkmen (for stops, partially)
- Uzbek (for stops)

Notes

- Hungarian, a Uralic language which lies geographically between Romanian, Germanic- and Slavic-speaking areas, does not have it.
- Kalmyk, despite featuring terminal devoicing, has epenthetic vowels at the end of most words which are not indicated in the orthography.

=== Creole languages ===
- Tok Pisin

== Examples ==
=== Dutch and Afrikaans ===
In Dutch and Afrikaans, terminal devoicing results in homophones such as hard 'hard' and hart 'heart' as well as differences in consonant sounds between the singular and plural forms of nouns, for example golf–golven (Dutch) and golf–golwe (Afrikaans) for 'wave–waves'.

The history of the devoicing phenomenon within the West Germanic languages is not entirely clear, but the discovery of a runic inscription from the early fifth century suggests that this terminal devoicing originated in Frankish. Of the old West Germanic languages, Old Dutch, a descendant of Frankish, is the earliest to show any kind of devoicing, and final devoicing also occurred in Frankish-influenced Old French.

Amelands, spoken on the Wadden Sea island of Ameland, is the only Dutch dialect that does not feature final-obstruent devoicing.

=== English ===
Standard varieties of English do not have phonological final-obstruent devoicing of the type that neutralizes phonemic contrasts; thus pairs like bad and bat are distinct in all major accents of English. Nevertheless, voiced obstruents are devoiced to some extent in final position in English, especially when phrase-final or when followed by a voiceless consonant (for example, bad cat [bæd̥ kʰæt]). Additionally, the voiced alveolar stop /d/ is regularly devoiced in African-American Vernacular English (AAVE).

Old English had final devoicing of /v/, although the spelling did not distinguish [f] and [v]. It can be inferred from the modern pronunciation of half with a voiceless /f/, from an originally voiced fricative [β] in Proto-Germanic *halbaz (preserved in German halb and Gothic halba). There was also final devoicing of [ɣ] to [x] finally, evidenced by spellings like burh alongside burg.

=== German ===
Final-obstruents devoicing occurs in the varieties from Northern Germany. The German contrast between homorganic obstruents is more properly described as a fortis and lenis opposition than an opposition of voiceless and voiced sounds. Therefore, the term devoicing may be misleading, since voice is only an optional feature of German lenis obstruents. By contrast, the German term for the phenomenon, Auslautverhärtung ('final-sound hardening'), refers to fortition rather than devoicing. However, the German phenomenon is similar to the final devoicing in other languages in that the opposition between two different kinds of obstruents disappears at the ends of words, and in fact at the ends of all syllables, making homophones of such pairs as Rad ('wheel') and Rat ('council, counsel'), both pronounced [ʁaːt]. The German varieties of the north, and many pronunciations of Standard German, involve voice in the distinction between fortis and lenis obstruents however. Final devoicing applies to all plosives, affricates and fricatives, and to loan words as well as native words.

Some examples from Northern German include:

Nouns			Verbs		
Singular	Translation	Plural	Imperative	Translation	Infinitive
Bad [baːt]	bath	Bäder [ˈbɛːdɐ]	red! [ʁeːt]	talk!	reden [ˈʁeːdn̩]
Raub [ʁaʊ̯p]	robbery	Raube [ˈʁaʊ̯bə]	reib! [ʁaɪ̯p]	rub!	reiben [ˈʁaɪ̯bn̩]
Zug [t͡suːk]	train	Züge [ˈt͡syːɡə]	sag! [zaːk]	say!	sagen [ˈzaːɡn̩]
Archiv [ʔaʁˈçiːf]	archive	Archive [ʔaʁˈçiːvə]			
Maus [maʊ̯s]	mouse	Mäuse [ˈmɔʏ̯zə]	lies! [liːs]	read!	lesen [ˈleːzn̩]
Orange [ʔoˈʁaŋʃ]	orange (colour)	Orange [ʔoˈʁaŋʒə]	manage! [ˈmɛnətʃ]	manage!	managen [ˈmɛnədʒən]

=== Russian ===
Final-obstruent devoicing can lead to the neutralization of phonemic contrasts in certain environments. For example, Russian бес ('demon', phonemically /bʲes/) and без ('without', phonemically /bʲez/) are pronounced identically in isolation as [bʲes].

The presence of this process in Russian is also the source of the seemingly variant transliterations of Russian names into -off (Russian: -ов), especially by the French, as well as older English transcriptions.

== Devoicing in compounds ==
In compounds, the behaviour varies between languages:

- In some languages, devoicing is lexicalized, which means that words that are devoiced in isolation retain that final devoicing when they are part of a compound. In English, for example, there is an alternation between voiced and voiceless fricatives in pairs such as the following:
  - thief ([f]) – thieve ([v])
  - bath ([θ]) – bathe ([ð])

The process is not productive in English; however, see Consonant voicing and devoicing.

- In other languages, it is purely phonological, which means that voicing depends solely on position and on assimilation with adjacent consonants; e.g., German.

== See also ==
- Consonant voicing and devoicing
- Lenition

== Sources ==
- Ammon, Ulrich; Bickel, Hans; et al., eds. (2004). Variantenwörterbuch des Deutschen. Berlin, New York: Walter de Gruyter. ISBN 3110165759.
- Brockhaus, Wiebke. (1995). Final Devoicing in the Phonology of German. Max Niemeyer.
- Chow, Daryl; Kharlamov, Viktor (September 2018). "Final devoicing in Singapore English". The Journal of the Acoustical Society of America. 144 (3): 1902. Bibcode:2018ASAJ..144Q1902C. doi:10.1121/1.5068331. S2CID 125369723.
- Dmitrieva, Olga (October 2014). "Final voicing and devoicing in American English". The Journal of the Acoustical Society of America. 136 (4): 2174. Bibcode:2014ASAJ..136.2174D. doi:10.1121/1.4899867.
- Grijzenhout, Janet (2000). "Voicing and devoicing in English, German, and Dutch: Evidence for domain-specific identity constraints".
- Crowley, Terry & Bowern Claire. (2010). An Introduction to Historical Linguistics (Fourth ed.). New York, NY: Oxford University Press. ISBN 0195365542
