= Old Franconian =

Old Franconian may mean:

- Old Frankish language, the Frankish language, an extinct West Germanic language spoken by the Franks
- Old Low Franconian or Old Dutch, the earliest form of Dutch and related languages
- Old High Franconian or Old Franconian, the earliest form of various languages.
