= Leiden Willeram =

Abbey of Egmond
- Location where the Leiden Willeram was produced in the 11th c., projected on a modern map of the Low Countries.
- Coordinates: 52°35′42″N 4°39′37″E

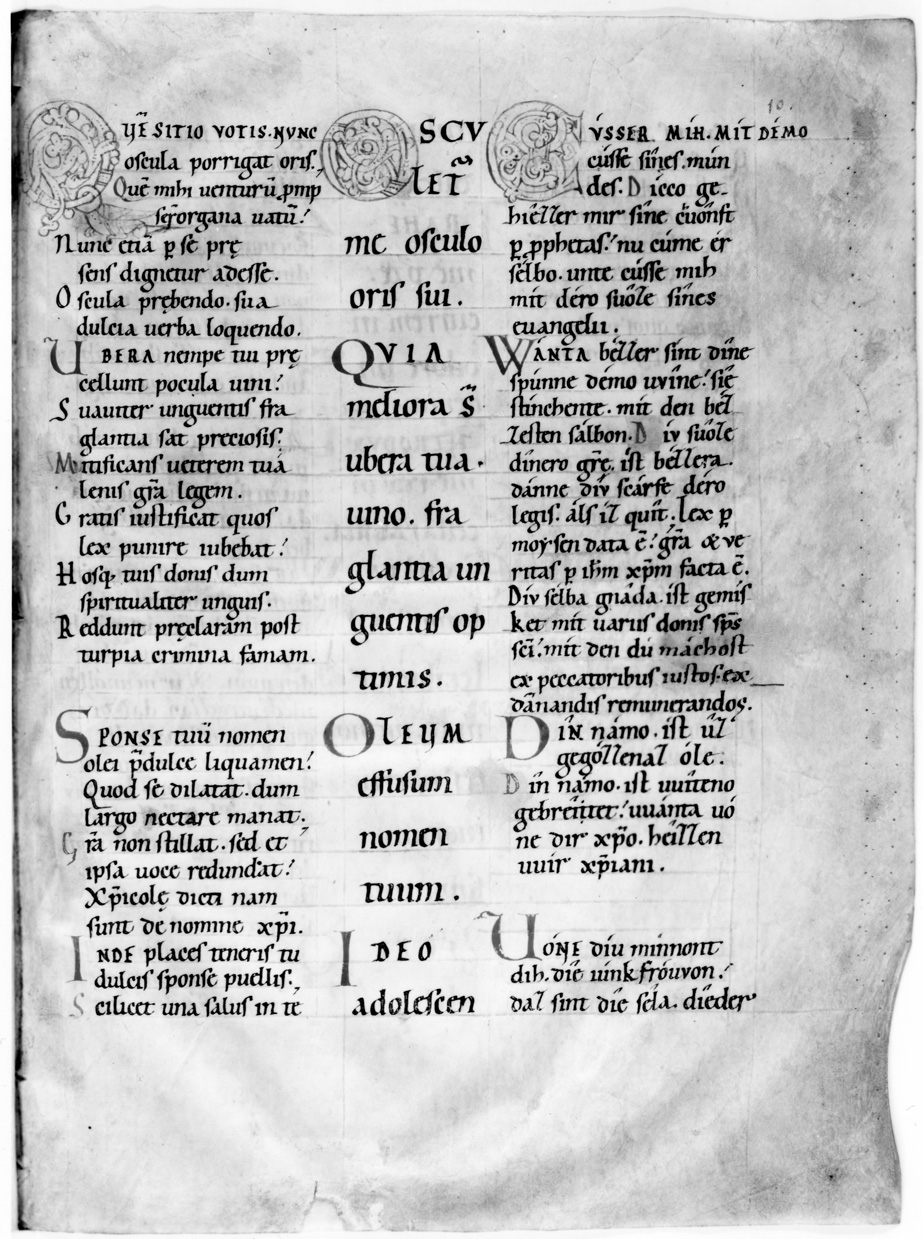

The Leiden Willeram or Egmond Willeram, is a manuscript (UB Leiden, MS BPL 130) containing an Old Dutch version of the Old High German commentary on Song of Solomon by the German abbot Williram of Ebersberg. The translation, since 1597 in the Leiden University Library, was done at the end of the 11th century by a monk of the Abbey of Egmond in the present day Netherlands.

Until recently, based on its orthography and phonology the text of this manuscript was believed by most scholars to be Middle Franconian, that is Old High German, with some Limburgic or otherwise Low Franconian admixtures. But in 1974, the German philologist Willy Sanders proved in his study Der Leidener Willeram that the text actually represents an imperfect attempt by a scribe from the northwestern coastal area of the Low Countries to translate the East Franconian original into his local Old Dutch vernacular. The text contains many Old Dutch words not known in Old High German, as well as mistranslated words caused by the scribe's unfamiliarity with some Old High German words in the original he translated, and a confused orthography heavily influenced by the Old High German original. For instance, the grapheme <z> is used after the High German tradition where it represents Germanic t shifted to /ts/. The Leiden Willeram contains the earliest attestation of 136 Dutch lexemes.

A digital version of the manuscript can be consulted via Leiden University Libraries’ Digital Collections.

== See also ==
- History of Dutch
