= Dietsch =

Dietsch may refer to:

- Dietsch (surname), a surname

== Languages ==
- German (disambiguation)
- Low German (disambiguation)
- Low German
- Middle Dutch
