= History of the Dutch language =

Dutch is a West Germanic language, that originated from the Old Frankish dialects. Countries that have Dutch as an official language are the Netherlands, Belgium, Suriname, Sint Maarten, Curaçao and Aruba.

== Relation to the Germanic languages group ==
Map of the Pre-Roman Iron Age culture(s) associated with Proto-Germanic, ca 500 BC–50 BC. The area south of Scandinavia is the Jastorf culture.

Within the Indo-European language tree, Dutch is grouped within the Germanic languages, which means it shares a common ancestor with languages such as English, German, and Scandinavian languages.

This common, but not direct, ancestor (proto-language) of all contemporary Germanic languages is called Proto-Germanic, commonly assumed to have originated in approximately the mid-1st millennium BC in Iron Age northern Europe. All Germanic languages are united by subjection to the sound shifts of Grimm's law and Verner's law which originated Proto-Germanic. These two laws define the basic differentiating features of Germanic languages that separate them from other Indo-European languages.

There are no known documents in Proto-Germanic, which was unwritten, and virtually all our knowledge of this early language has been obtained by application of the comparative method. All modern Germanic languages (such as English, German, Dutch, etc.) gradually split off from Proto-Germanic, beginning around the Early Middle Ages. As the earliest surviving Germanic writing, there are a few inscriptions in a runic script from Scandinavia dated to c. 200, which represent Proto-Norse spoken in Scandinavia after it had split as a local dialect from common Proto-Germanic.

== West Germanic ==
From the time of their earliest attestation, the Germanic dialects were divided into three groups, West, East, and North Germanic. Their exact relation is difficult to determine from the sparse evidence of runic inscriptions, and they remained mutually intelligible to some degree throughout the Migration Period. This means some individual dialects are difficult to classify. The Western group would have formed as a dialect of Proto-Germanic in the late Jastorf culture (ca. 1st century BC).

During the Early Middle Ages, the West Germanic languages were separated by the insular development of Old English (Anglo-Saxon) and related Old Frisian, the High German consonant shift, and the relatively conservative (in respect to common West Germanic) ancestors of Low Saxon and Old Dutch.

== Frankish language ==
The Frankish language, also Old Frankish was the language of the Franks. Classified as a West Germanic language, it was spoken in areas covering modern France, Germany, and the Low Countries in Merovingian times, preceding the 6th/7th century. The Franks first established themselves in the Netherlands and Flanders before they started to fight their way down south and east. The language had a significant impact on Old French. It evolved into Old Low Franconian in the north and it was replaced by French in the south, Old Frankish is reconstructed from loanwords in Old French, and from Diets (Old Dutch).

The singular direct attestation from Old Frankish is the Bergakker inscription, that was found in 1996 near the Dutch town of Bergakker, near Tiel. It is a 5th-century Elder Futhark inscription on a metal mount for a sword scabbard.

The inscription can be read as

ha?VþV??s : ann : kVsjam :
: logVns :

where V is a non-standard rune, apparently a vowel (variously read as e or u, or as "any vowel").

Several readings have been presented in literature. Quak (2000) for example, reads "Ha(þu)þ[e]was ann k(u)sjam log(u)ns", interpreting it as "[property] of Haþuþewaz. I bestow upon the choosers of the swords".

== Old Dutch ==
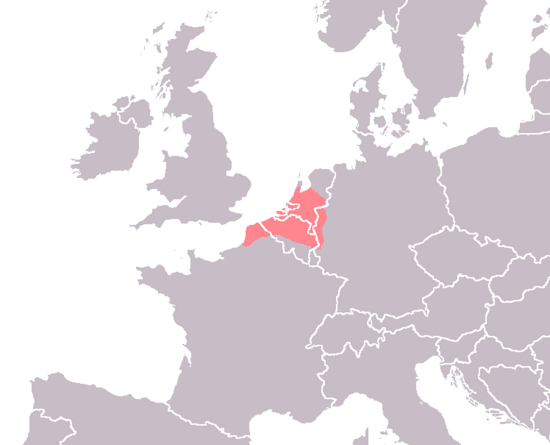
Area in which Old Dutch was spoken.

Old Dutch is the language ancestral to the Low Franconian languages, including Dutch itself. It was spoken between the 6th and 11th centuries, continuing the earlier Old Frankish language. It did not participate in the High German Consonant Shift. In this period a perfect dialect continuum remained between Franconian and Saxon areas, as well as between Low Franconian and Middle or High Franconian.

The present Dutch standard language is derived from Old Dutch dialects spoken in the Low Countries that were first recorded in the Salic law, a Frankish document written around 510. From this document originated the oldest sentence that has been identified as Dutch: "Maltho thi afrio lito" as sentence used to free a serf. Other old segments of Dutch are "Visc flot aftar themo uuatare" ("A fish was swimming in the water") and "Gelobistu in got alamehtigan fadaer" ("Do you believe in God the almighty father"). The latter fragment was written around 900.

Arguably the most famous text containing what is traditionally taken to be Old Dutch is: "Hebban olla vogala nestas hagunnan, hinase hic enda tu, wat unbidan we nu" ("All birds have started making nests, except me and you, what are we waiting for"), dating around the year 1100, written by a Flemish monk in a convent in Rochester, England.

The oldest known single word is wad, attested in the toponym vadam (modern Wadenoijen), meaning a ford (where one wades), in Tacitus's Histories.

The Hebban olla vogala fragment

== Middle Dutch ==

Linguistically speaking, Middle Dutch is a collective name for closely related dialects which were spoken and written between about 1150 and 1550 in the present-day Dutch-speaking region. There was at that time as yet no overarching standard language, but they were all probably mutually intelligible.

In historic literature Diets and Middle Dutch (Middelnederlands) are used interchangeably to describe the ancestor of Modern Dutch. Although almost from the beginning, several Middle Dutch variations emerged, the similarities between the different regional languages were likely much stronger than their differences, especially for written languages and various literary works of that time.

Within Middle Dutch five large groups can be distinguished:

1. Flemish, (sometimes subdivided into West and East Flemish), was spoken in the modern region of West and East Flanders;
2. Brabantian was the language of the area covered by the modern Dutch province of North Brabant and the Belgian provinces of Walloon Brabant, Flemish Brabant and Antwerp as well as the Brussels capital region;
3. Hollandic was mainly used in the present provinces of North and South Holland and parts of Utrecht;
4. Limburgish, spoken by the people in the district of modern Limburg, Belgian Limburg and in the neighbouring regions of Germany (North Rhine-Westphalia);
5. Low Saxon, spoken in the area of the modern provinces of Gelderland, Overijssel, Drenthe and parts of Groningen.

The last two of the Middle Dutch dialects mentioned above could also be considered part of, respectively, Middle High German and Middle Low German, on purely linguistical grounds. The Dutch state border would later intersect these dialect areas and as a result regions west of it would use the Dutch standard language, the reason why they are subsumed under Middle Dutch.

== Standardization and Modern Dutch ==
A process of standardization started in the Middle Ages, especially under the influence of the Burgundian Ducal Court in Dijon (Brussels after 1477). The dialects of Flanders and Brabant were the most influential around this time. The process of standardization became much stronger in the 16th century, mainly based on the urban Brabantic dialect of Antwerp. In 1585 Antwerp fell to the Spanish army: many fled to Holland, influencing the urban dialects of that province. Brabantian, as compared to other main Dutch dialects, had a big influence on the development of Standard Dutch. This was because Brabant was the dominant region in the Netherlands when standardization of the Dutch language started in the 16th century. The first major formation of standard Dutch also took place in Antwerp, where a Brabantian dialect is spoken. The default language being developed around this time had therefore mainly Brabantian influences. The 16th-century Brabantian dialect is rather close to colloquial Dutch. The standard Dutch language has mainly developed from Brabantian and later some Hollandish dialects from post 16th century. The Standard Dutch language has evolved little since the 16th century. In 1637 a further important step was made towards a unified language, when the first major Dutch Bible translation, the Statenvertaling, was published that people from all over the United Provinces could understand. It used elements from various dialects, but the spoken form was mostly based on the urban dialects from the province of Holland. A linguistic saying therefore is that "The Dutch language was born in Flanders, grew up in Brabant and reached maturity in Holland." At the same time a process of standardisation took place in the areas in which High German was spoken. Ultimately, all regions east of the political border of the Netherlands would adopt a single German Hochsprache, breaking the dialect continuum around the 19th century and onward.

Genesis 1:1–3
Dutch from 1637	Contemporary Dutch
Inden beginne schiep Godt den Hemel, ende de Aerde.	In het begin schiep God de hemel en de aarde
De Aerde nu was woest ende ledich, ende duysternisse was op den afgront: ende de Geest Godts sweefde op de Wateren.	De aarde nu was woest en leeg, en duisternis was op de afgrond, en de Geest van God zweefde over de wateren.
Ende Godt seyde: Daer zy Licht: ende daer wert Licht.	En God zei: Laat er licht zijn! En er was licht.

== Development of Germanic sounds ==
Linguistically speaking, Dutch has evolved little since the late 16th century; differences in speech are considered to be negligible, especially when comparing the older form with modern regional accents. Grammar has been somewhat simplified, but a great deal of the grammar lost in contemporary Dutch is preserved in many much-used expressions dating back to or before that time.

=== Vowels ===
Proto-Germanic	Old Dutch	Middle Dutch		Modern Dutch	
		Closed Syllable	Open Syllable	Closed Syllable	Open Syllable
a	ɑ	ɑ	ɑː	ɑ	aː
a	ɛ (i-umlaut)	ɛ	ɛː	ɛ	eː
e	e	ɛ	ɛː	ɛ	eː
i	i	ɪ	eː	ɪ	eː
u	u, o	ɔ	ɔː	ɔ	oː
u	y, ø (i-umlaut)	ʏ	øː	ʏ	øː
ɛː	ɑː	aː		aː	
iː	iː	iː		ɛi & iː (before r)	
eː	ie	iə		i	
eu	io	iə		i	
iu	iu	iə		i	
iu	iu	yː		œy & yː (before r & w)	
uː	uː, yː	yː		œy & yː (before r & w)	
oː	uo	uə		u	
ai	eː	eː		eː	
ai	ei (i-umlaut/irregular)	ei		ɛi	
au	oː	oː		oː	

==== Specific sound changes ====
Proto-Germanic	Old Dutch	Middle Dutch	Modern Dutch
-ɛ:- (before hiatus)	-a:-	-ai̯:-	-ai̯:-
-o:w- / -o:- (before hiatus)	-uo:i- / -uo:w-	-u:i̯- / -ɔu̯-	-ui̯- / -ɔu̯-
-u:- (before hiatus)	-u:-	-yu̯- / -ɔu̯-	-yu̯- / -ɔu̯-
-i:w-	-i:w-	-yu̯- / -ɔu̯-	-yu̯- / -ɔu̯-
-ɛːw-	-ɛːw-	-yu̯- / -ɔu̯-	-yu̯- / -ɔu̯-
-iww-	-iww-	-yu̯- / -ɔu̯-	-yu̯- / -ɔu̯-
-eww-	-eww-	-yu̯- / -ɔu̯-	-yu̯- / -ɔu̯-
-aww-	-aww-	-o:i̯- / -ɔu-	-o:i̯- / -ɔu-
-iuw-	-iuw-	-iu̯-	-iu̯-

=== Consonants ===
Proto Germanic	Old Dutch				Middle & Modern Dutch			
	Initial	Between vowels	Geminated	Word final	Initial	Between vowels	Geminated*	Word final
k	k-	-k-	-kk-	-k	k-	-k-		-k
g ~ ɣ	ɣ-	-ɣ-	-gg-	-x	ɣ-	-ɣ-		-x
h ~ x	h-	-∅- (h syncope)	-xx-	-x	h-	-∅-	-x-	-x
p	p-	-p-	-pp-	-p	p-	-p-		-p
b ~ β	b-	-v-	-bb-	-f	b-	-v-	-b-, -p* (final)	-f
f	f-	-f-	-ff-	-f	v-	-v-	-f-	-f
t	t-	-t-	-tt-	-t	t-	-t-		-t
d ~ ð	d-	-d-	-dd-	-t	d-	-d-, -∅-* (d syncope)	-d-	-t
þ	þ- (> ð)	-þ-	-þþ-	-þ	d-	-d-, -∅-* (d syncope)	-s- / -t-	-t
s	s-	-s-	-ss-	-s	z-	-z-	-s-	-s
-z(-)	–	-r-	-*	-Ø*	–	-r-	–	-r

==== Specific sound changes ====
Proto Germanic	Old Dutch	Modern Dutch
ald/uld – alt/ult	ald/uld/old – alt/ult/olt	ɔu̯d – ɔu̯t
-egi-/-ehi-	-egi-/-ehi-	-ɛi-
ft	ft	xt
xs	xs / ss	s
mb	mb / mm	m
ŋg	ŋg	ŋ
wr-	wr-	vr- (Still spelled wr-)
xl- / xr- / xw-	l- / r- / w-	l- / r- / w-
