= Rhinelandic Rhyming Bible =

The Rhinelandic Rhyming Bible (Dutch: Rijnlandse Rijmbijbel and German: Rheinische Reimbibel), or (erroneously) Central Franconian Rhyming Bible (German: Mittelfränkische Reimbibel), is a verse translation of biblical histories, attested only in a series of fragments, probably of early-twelfth-century date. It was likely composed in north-west Germany in the early 12th century, possibly in Werden Abbey, on the border of Old High German (Old Central Franconian), Old Low German (Old Low Saxon), and Old Dutch (Old Low Franconian).

The recovered fragments come from three different manuscripts written in the three different language variants. They are currently referenced under the letters A, A *, B, B * and C. The fragments complement each other, although there is also a small overlap between the A and B versions. The A fragments can be clearly assigned to a Dutch Low Franconian writer, the B fragments and the C fragment would rather be of German Central Franconian origin, although others also consider the C-fragment to be rather Low Franconian. In total, about 1450 verses were found. The original should have been at least twice as long.

The material contains the early Old Testament, the Gospels, the apocryphal and hagiographical legends relating to early Church history. In its original form the work may have incorporated the Creation to the Last Judgement. The text is a series of homilies, and an important witness to the possible existence of a vernacular sermon tradition at an earlier date than existing manuscript evidence suggests. The text is also an important source for Old Dutch.
