= Alfred Bammesberger =

German emeritus professor and linguist (1938–2025)

- Born: September 25, 1938
- Died: January 7, 2025 (aged 86)
- Known for: Contributions to Indo-Germanic studies, Old German studies, English studies, and Baltic studies; Editor of Historische Sprachforschung/Historical Linguistics

Academic background
- Education: Ludwig-Maximilians-Universität München; University of Freiburg (Habilitation)
- Thesis: (1965)

Academic work
- Era: 20th and 21st centuries
- Discipline: Linguistics
- Sub-discipline: English and Comparative Linguistics, Indo-Germanic studies, Old German studies, Baltic studies
- Institutions: Catholic University of Eichstätt
- Main interests: Historical linguistics

Alfred Bammesberger (25 September 1938 – 7 January 2025) was a German academic who became Professor Emeritus of English and Comparative Linguistics at the Catholic University of Eichstätt.

== Life and career ==
State examination in English and French 1962–1965, Dr. phil. (Ludwig-Maximilians-Universität München in 1965), Habilitation (University of Freiburg in 1970). Professor of English and Comparative Linguistics, Catholic University of Eichstätt from 1980, emeritus 2006. Declined appointments: University of Münster (1979), University of Würzburg (1988), University of Freiburg (1989).

Bammesberger was the author of more than 25 scholarly books and numerous essays on historical linguistics, with a focus on Indo-Germanic studies, Old German studies, English studies, and Baltic studies. From 1985 to 2015, Alfred Bammesberger was editor of the journal Historische Sprachforschung/Historical Linguistics and he was still co-editor of the journal Onomasiology Online (2022). He was an external member of the Polish Academy of Arts and Sciences in Krakow.

Bammesberger died on 7 January 2025, at the age of 86.

== Works (selection) ==
- Deverbative jan-Verba des Altenglischen - Munich, 1965
- Abstraktbildungen in den baltischen Sprachen (= Zeitschrift für vergleichende Sprachforschung auf dem Gebiet der indogermanischen Sprachen. Ergänzungshefte. 22). Vandenhoeck & Ruprecht, Göttingen 1973, ISBN 3-525-26208-6 (Simultaneously abridged: Freiburg, university, Habilitations-Schrift, 1971).
- Beiträge zu einem etymologischen Wörterbuch des Altenglischen [Contributions to an etymological Dictionary of the Old English language] - Heidelberg : Winter, 1979
- Englische Sprachwissenschaft English Linguistics- Munich: Minerva-Publikation, 1981
- An outline of modern Irish grammar - Heidelberg: Winter, 1983
- Twentieth century Irish prose - Heidelberg: Winter, 1984
- A sketch of diachronic English morphology - Regensburg: Pustet, 1984
- Studien zur Laryngaltheorie [Studies on Laryngeal Theory] - Göttingen: Vandenhoeck und Ruprecht, 1984
- Lateinische Sprachwissenschaft Latin Linguistics - Regensburg : Pustet, 1984
- As editor: The etymological dictionary. Questions of conception and design. Friedrich Pustet, Regensburg 1983.
- English etymology. Carl Winter, Heidelberg 1984.
- Problems of old English lexicography - Regensburg: Pustet, 1985
- Linguistic notes on Old English poetic texts - Heidelberg: Winter, 1986
- Der Aufbau des germanischen Verbalsystems - Heidelberg: Winter, 1986
- English linguistics - Heidelberg: Winter, 1989
- Britain 400–600 - Heidelberg: Winter, 1990
- As editor with Gaby Waxenberger: Pforzen und Bergakker. New investigations on runic inscriptions (= Historische Sprachforschung. Ergänzungsheft. 41). Vandenhoeck & Ruprecht, Göttingen 1990, ISBN 3-525-26231-0, (digital copy).
- Old English runes and their continental background - Heidelberg: Winter, 1991
- Akten des VIII. Internationalen Kolloquiums zur Lateinischen Linguistik / International Colloquium on Latin Linguistics (1995: Eichstätt). - Heidelberg: Winter, 1996
- Index to the Journal of Comparative Linguistics, Volumes 1–100 (1851–1987). Vandenhoeck & Ruprecht, Göttingen 1997.
- As editor: Baltic Studies. Tasks and Methods (= Indo-European Library. Dept. 3: Investigations. 19). Winter, Heidelberg 1998, ISBN 3-8253-0726-3.
- Baltistik - Heidelberg: Winter, 1998
- Repetitorium zur englischen Sprachwissenschaft - Heidelberg: Winter, 1999
- Languages in prehistoric Europe - Heidelberg: Winter, 2003
- Das fuþark und seine einzelsprachlichen Weiterentwicklungen - Berlin/Boston: De Gruyter, 2006 (online ressource)

== Literature about A. Bammesberger ==
- Bammesberger, Alfred. In: Wilfried Kürschner (ed.): Linguisten-Handbuch. 2 vols. Narr, Tübingen 1994, ISBN 3-8233-5000-5, vol. 1, p. 31 f. (online).
