= Williram of Ebersberg =

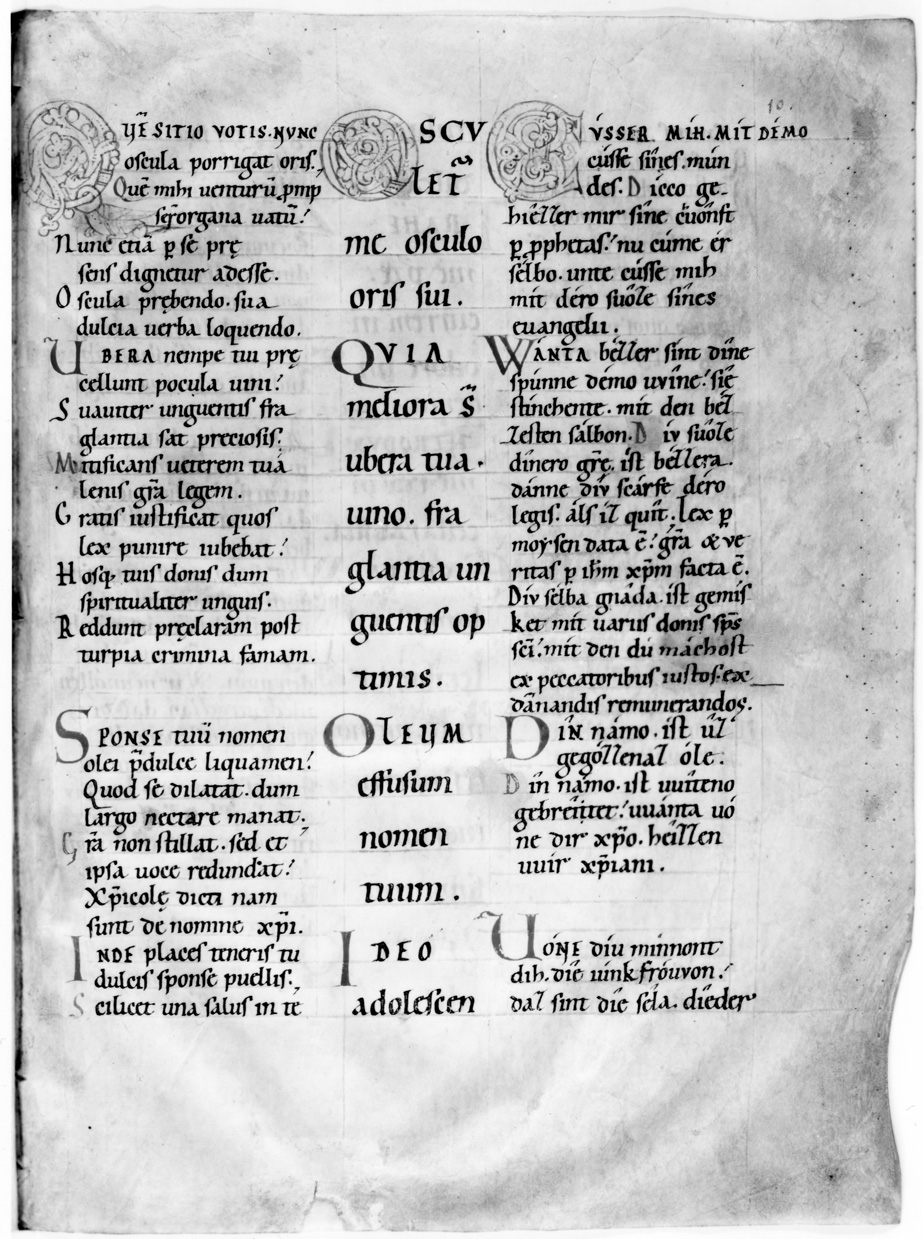
Munich manuscript cgm 10

Williram of Ebersberg (died 3 January 1085) was a Benedictine abbot. He is best known for his Expositio in Cantica Canticorum, a complex commentary of the Song of Songs which includes an Old High German translation and a Latin verse paraphrase.

== Biography ==
Williram came from a noble family in the Rhine area, related, among others, to the archbishop Heribert of Cologne (999–1021), the Würzburg bishop Heinrich (995–1018), and the Eichstätt bishops Heribert (1022–1042) und Gezemann (1042). Ca.1020, he entered the Benedictine monastery Fulda, then in the 1040s became teacher in the Benedictine monastery Michelsberg in Bamberg, together among others with bishop Suidger, the future pope Clemens II. (1046–1047). Williram belonged to the court circle of emperor Henry III (1039–1056). In 1048, he became abbot at the Benedictine monastery of Ebersberg where he remained until his death in 1085. He was a friend of the Benedictine abbot Wilhelm of Hirsau for whom he wrote a new version of the Life of Saint Aurelius, the patron saint of Hirsau.

In the preface to his Expositio which he dedicated to Henry IV, Williram laments that, in Germany, grammar and dialectics are more popular than Biblical studies, praises Lanfranc devoting himself to the deeper study of the Bible and drawing many German scholars to France. The pages of his work are divided into three columns: The first contains a Latin paraphrase in Leonine hexameters of the Vulgate followed for each of the 150 paragraphs of the Song of Songs by a paraphrase of the prose commentary on the right hand side column; the second, the Vulgate text; and the third, an Old High German prose translation followed by a commentary in Latin-German mixed prose exposition. Williram describes his text as supporting the "body" of the Bible text which is marked up with the 'voces' of Christ, the Synagogue and the Church.

Williram is believed also to be the author of the Chronicon Eberspergense, a set of monastic annals included in the Ebersberg cartulary, which he also compiled.

== Transmission ==
Williram's commentary is the Old High German text with the highest number of surviving manuscripts, right up to the print tradition. It is remarkable that two manuscripts are extant which were probably written during his lifetime in the Abbey of Ebersberg. One of these, the codex Bayerische Staatsbibliothek Cgm 10, contains also his Latin poems. About 1100, an Old Dutch adaptation of Williram's commentary was produced.

The editio princeps of the Expositio, based on the Leiden manuscript, was published in 1598 by the librarian of Leiden University Library, Paulus Merula. Merula omitted the prologue, though it was in the Leiden manuscript, so Martin Opitz printed this in his Annolied edition of 1639. It appears that the Annolied and Williram's Expositio had been transmitted together on a number of occasions in the manuscript tradition, including in the manuscript used for Opitz's edition.

== See also ==
- Leiden Willeram
