= Diet =

Diet may refer to:

== Food ==
- Diet (nutrition), the sum of the food consumed by an organism or group
- Dieting, the deliberate selection of food to control body weight or nutrient intake
  - Diet food, foods that aid in creating a diet for weight loss or gain
- Healthy diet, the process of helping to maintain or improve overall health

== Politics ==
- Diet (assembly), a formal deliberative assembly

=== Current ===
- National Diet, Japan's bicameral legislature, in its current form since 1947, composed of the House of Representatives and the House of Councillors
- Landtag, a diet of states and provinces in Germany, Austria, South Tyrol in Italy, and the national parliament of Liechtenstein
- Bundestag (Deutscher Bundestag), the lower house of Germany's Parliament, was established in West Germany in 1949, and all of Germany in 1990
- Riksdag, the unicameral legislature of Sweden

=== Historical ===
- Diet of Finland, the legislative assembly of the Grand Duchy of Finland from 1809 to 1906
- Diet of Hungary, the legislative assembly of the Kingdom of Hungary from 15th century to 1946
- Imperial Diet (Holy Roman Empire), the imperial assembly of the princes of the Holy Roman Empire until 1806
- Federal Convention (German Confederation), or Confederate Diet (German: Bundesversammlung or Bundestag) was the only central institution of the German Confederation (1815–1848 and 1850–1866)
- Reichstag
  - Reichstag (German Empire) (Reichstag), the Diet of the Empire, the legislative assembly of the German Empire, 1871–1917
  - Reichstag (Weimar Republic), (Reichstag), the Diet of the Weimar Republic, from 1919 to 1933
  - Reichstag (Nazi Germany), (Reichstag), the Diet of Nazi Germany, from 1933 to 1945, a purely ceremonial "parliament" in a totalitarian dictatorship without elections

== Television, film, or music ==
- "Diet", an episode of the Adult Swim animated television series, Aqua Teen Hunger Force
- The Diet (cartoon), a Beetle Bailey animated short
- "Diet", a 2020 single by Peakboy

== Other uses ==
- DIET, an open-source middleware for high-performance computing

== See also ==
- List of diets
- Dietsch (disambiguation), distinguishes the southern dialects in the Middle Dutch language
