= Low Franconian =

Language family

- Lower Franconian, Low Frankish; Netherlandic, Netherlandish; Dutch: Nederfrankisch; German: Niederfränkisch
- Geographic distribution: Netherlands, northern Belgium, northern France, western Germany, Suriname, Curaçao, Aruba, Namibia and South Africa
- Linguistic classification: Indo-European: Germanic; West Germanic; Weser–Rhine Germanic; Low Franconian
- Early form: Frankish
- Subdivisions: West or North Low Franconian (including Dutch and Afrikaans); East or South Low Franconian (including Limburgish and Bergish)

Language codes
- Glottolog: macr1270 Macro-Dutch
- Low Franconian-speaking areas in three continents

In historical and comparative linguistics, Low Franconian is a linguistic category used to classify a number of historical and contemporary West Germanic varieties closely related to, and including, the Dutch language. Most dialects and languages included within this category are spoken in the Netherlands, northern Belgium (Flanders), in the Nord department of France, in western Germany (Lower Rhine), as well as in Suriname, South Africa and Namibia.

== Terminology ==
Low Franconian is a purely linguistic category and not used as a term of self-designation among any of the speakers of the Germanic dialects traditionally grouped within it.

Within the field of historical philology, the terminology for the historical phases of Low Franconian is not analogous to the traditional Old High German / Middle High German and Old Low German / Middle Low German dichotomies, with the terms Old Dutch and Middle Dutch commonly being preferred to Old Low Franconian and Middle Low Franconian in most contexts. Due to the category's strong interconnection with the Dutch language and its historical forms, Low Franconian is occasionally used interchangeably with Dutch, though the latter term can have a broader as well as narrower meaning depending on the specific context. English publications alternatively use Netherlandic as a synonym of Low Franconian at its earlier historical stages, thereby signifying the category's close relation to Dutch, without using it as a synonym.

Low Franconian is sometimes, and especially was historically, grouped together with Low Saxon, referred to as Low German. However, this grouping is not based on common linguistic innovations, but rather on the absence of the High German consonant shift. In fact, in nineteenth century literature this grouping could also include English, another West Germanic language that did not undergo the consonant shift.

The term Frankish or Franconian as a modern linguistic category was coined by the German linguist Wilhelm Braune (1850–1926). He divided Franconian which contained both Germanic dialects which had and had not experienced the Second Germanic consonant shift into Low, Middle and High Franconian, with the use of Low signifying that this category did not participate in the sound shift.

The noun from which the gentilic is derived refers to Franconia, the very far territory of the so-named High Franconian German within its own Upper German linguistic group in Northern Bavaria, Germany (among Ripuarian Franconian, Moselle Franconian or Lorraine Franconian-Rhine Franconian, these from north to south of the Central Franconian, already between eastern Belgium or eastern France and western Germany).

== Origins ==
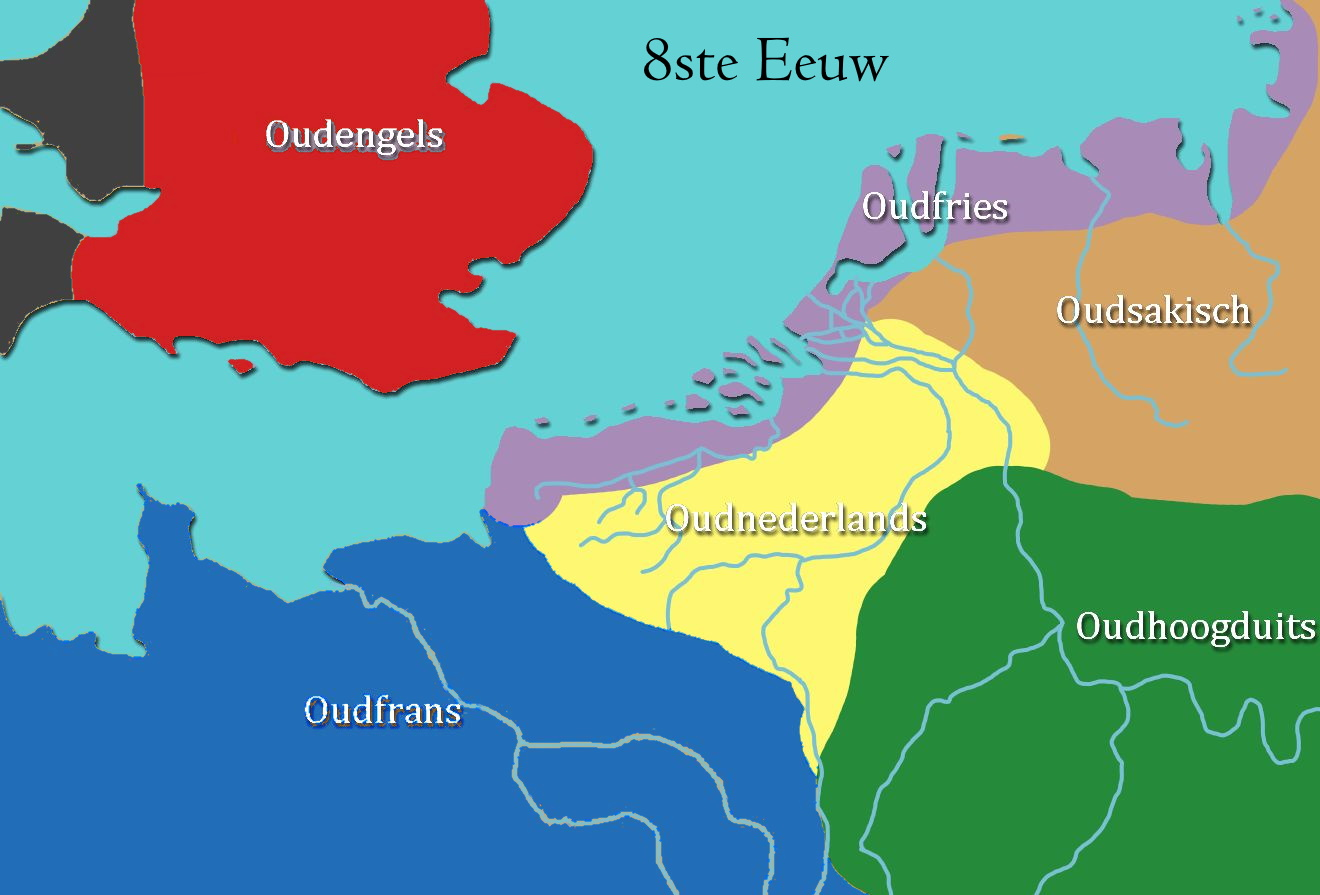
Old Dutch language area according to philologist Peter-Alexander Kerkhof, 2020 (approximate; in reality, there were no clear boundaries between Germanic dialect groups)

Despite the name, the diachronical connection to Old Frankish, the unattested language spoken by the Franks, is unclear for most of the varieties grouped under the broad "Franconian" category, mainly due to the heavy influence of Elbe Germanic/High German features in the Middle and High Franconian varieties following the Migration Period. The dialects of the Low Franconian grouping form an exception to this, with the dialects generally being accepted to be the most direct descendants of Old Frankish. As such, Old Dutch and Middle Dutch, together with loanwords in Old French, are the principal languages used to reconstruct Old Frankish using the comparative method.

Within historical linguistics, Old Low Franconian is synonymous with Old Dutch. Depending on the author, the temporal boundary between Old Dutch and Old Frankish is either defined by the onset of the Second Germanic consonant shift in Eastern Frankish, the assimilation of an unattested coastal dialect showing North Sea Germanic features by West Frankish in the late 9th century, or a combination of both.

In turn, Old Low Franconian is divided into two subgroups: Old West Low Franconian (spoken in Flanders, Brabant and Holland) and Old East Low Franconian (spoken in Limburg and the Rhineland). Old West Low Franconian "is the ancestor ultimately of Dutch".

== Modern classification ==
Low Franconian includes:

- West Low Franconian (Westnederfrankisch; in Germany also referred to as North Low Franconian (Nordniederfränkisch)): north of the Uerdingen line
  - Brabantish (Brabants)
  - West Flemish (West-Vlaams; also spoken in northern France)
  - East Flemish (Oost-Vlaams)
  - Zeelandic (Zeeuws)
  - Hollands-Utrechts
    - Hollandic (Hollands)
  - the dialect of North-Noordholland and the North Sea Coast
  - Kleverlandish
- South Low Franconian (Zuidnederfrankisch, Südniederfränkisch; also: East Low Franconian (Oostnederfrankisch)). In Belgium and the Netherlands commonly referred to as Limburgs (Limburgish), although this term is rarely applied to varieties of this group spoken in Germany.

South Low Franconian occupies a special position among the Low Franconian subgroups, since it shares several linguistic features with Ripuarian dialects spoken to the southeast, such as the conditioned split of the West Germanic diphthongs *ai and *au (e.g. in Roermonds *ai splits to /eː/ and /ɛi/, *au to /oː/ and /ɔu/), which apart from Ripuarian is also found in all other High German dialects, and the characteristic pitch accent, which is exclusively shared with Ripuarian and Moselle Franconian. (Note: Traditionally, the Uerdingen line (separating ik and ich 'I') and the Benrath line (separating maken and machen 'to make') have been considered respectively the northern and southern borders of South Low Franconian. However, both Dutch and German scholars have questioned the classificatory value of the Uerdingen line: in the (north-)west, it is too inclusive, while in the north in Dutch Limburg and in the northeast in the Rhineland, the scope of South Low Franconian extends beyond the Uerdingen line when considering structural features such as the occurrence of pitch accent and the reflexes of West Germanic vowels.)

== Area loss ==
Until the Early Modern Period, all speakers of varieties of Low Franconian used Middle Dutch or Early Modern Dutch as their literary language and Dachsprache. There was a marked change in the 19th century, when the historically Dutch-speaking region of French Flanders underwent a period of Francisation under the auspices of the French government. Similarly, in the Lower Rhine region, local literary Low Franconian varieties were employed in official use until the 17th century, but were subsequently replaced by standard German in most parts, except for Upper Guelders and Cleves (both since 1701 part of Prussia), where standard Dutch prevailed as literary language. Following the incorporation of Upper Guelders and Cleves into the Prussian Rhine Province, there was extensive Germanisation, and Dutch was replaced by German for official use, and its use discouraged in favor of German in the public sphere, leading to a rapid decline in the use of standard Dutch. Vernacular Low Franconian varieties continue to be spoken in the Lower Rhine region to this day, but many speakers have switched to local colloquial forms of German (Umgangssprache) since the second half of the 20th century due to increased mobility and wider access to mass media. In addition, the historically Dutch-speaking Brussels Capital Region is officially bilingual, but now largely francophone.

== See also ==
- Dutch dialects
- Istvaeones
- History of Dutch
- Middle Dutch
