= Leather bag =

Leather bag may refer to:

- a bag made of leather
- Waterskin, a receptacle, normally made of a sheep or goat skin, used to hold water
- Leatherbag, an American rock band

== See also ==
- Birkin bag, an Hermès tote bag
- Kelly bag, an Hermès handbag
- Gladstone bag, a small portmanteau suitcase
