= Frankish language =

West Germanic language spoken by the Franks from the 5th to 10th centuries

Frankish
- Old Franconian
- *Frankisk
- Native to: Francia
- Region: Western Europe
- Era: c. 5th to 9th century, gradually evolved into Old Dutch, dissolved with other West Germanic varieties into Old High German, and influenced as superstrate Old French.
- Language family: Indo-European: Germanic; West Germanic; Frankish
- Writing system: Elder Futhark (not widely used)

Language codes
- ISO 639-3: frk
- Glottolog: fran1264

Frankish (reconstructed Frankish: *Frankisk), also known as Old Franconian or Old Frankish, was the West Germanic language spoken by the Franks between the 4th and 8th centuries.

Between the 5th and 9th centuries, the Frankish spoken by the Salian Franks in the Low Countries evolved into Old Dutch (Old Low Franconian).

The Salian Franks who settled in Gaul were eventually subsumed by the local Gallo-Roman populace, who spoke Proto-Romance dialects, e.g. Old French. However, a number of modern French words and place names, including the country name "France", have a Frankish (i.e. Germanic) origin. France itself is still known by terms meaning "Frankish Realm" in numerous languages, e.g. German (which uses Frankreich).

The Old Frankish language is poorly attested and mostly reconstructed from Frankish loanwords in Old French, and from Old Dutch, as recorded in the 6th to 12th centuries. A notable exception is the Bergakker inscription, which may represent a primary record of 5th-century Frankish.

== Nomenclature ==
Germanic philology and German studies have their origins in the first half of the 19th century when Romanticism and Romantic thought heavily influenced the lexicon of the linguists and philologists of the time, including pivotal figures such as the Brothers Grimm. As a result, many contemporary linguists tried to incorporate their findings in an already existing historical framework of "stem duchies" and Altstämme (lit. "old tribes", i.e. the six Germanic tribes then thought to have formed the "German nation" in the traditional German nationalism of the elites) resulting in a taxonomy which spoke of "Bavarian", "Saxon", "Frisian", "Thuringian", "Swabian" and "Frankish" dialects. While this nomenclature became generally accepted in traditional Germanic philology, it has also been described as "inherently inaccurate" as these ancient ethnic boundaries (as understood in the 19th century) bore little or limited resemblance to the actual or historical linguistic situation of the Germanic languages. Among other problems, this traditional classification of the continental West Germanic dialects can suggest stronger ties between dialects than is linguistically warranted. The Franconian group is a well known example of this, with East Franconian being much more closely related to Bavarian dialects than it is to Dutch, which is traditionally placed in the Low Franconian sub-grouping and with which it was thought to have had a common, tribal origin.

In a modern linguistic context, the language of the early Franks is variously called "Old Frankish" or "Old Franconian" and refers to the language of the Franks prior to the advent of the High German consonant shift, which took place between 600 and 700 CE. After this consonant shift the Frankish dialect diverges, with the dialects which would become modern Dutch not undergoing the consonantal shift, while all others did so to varying degrees. As a result, the distinction between Old Dutch and Old Frankish is largely negligible, with Old Dutch (also called Old Low Franconian) being the term used to distinguish the non-affected variants from the ones affected by the aforementioned Second Germanic consonant shift.

== History ==
=== Origins ===
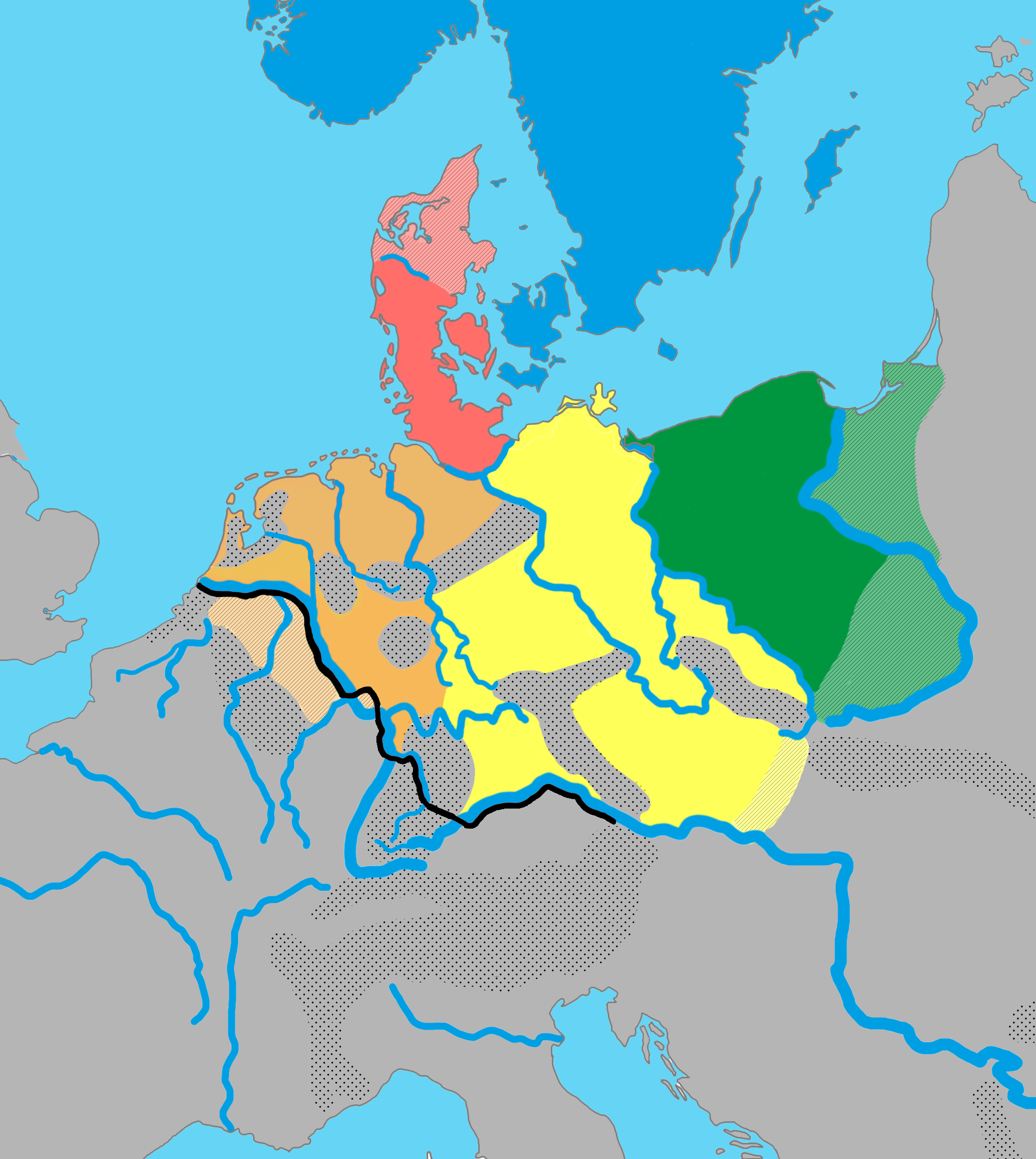
A proposed distribution of five primary Proto-Germanic dialect groups in Europe around the turn of the millennia: North Germanic (→Proto-Norse by 300 AD) North Sea Germanic (Ingvaeonic) Weser-Rhine Germanic (Istvaeonic) Elbe Germanic (Irminonic) East Germanic (→Gothic by 300 AD)

The Germanic languages are traditionally divided into three groups: West, East and North Germanic. Their exact relation is difficult to determine, and they remained mutually intelligible throughout the Migration Period, rendering some individual varieties difficult to classify.

The language spoken by the Franks was part of the West Germanic language group, which had features from Proto-Germanic in the late Jastorf culture (ca. 1st century BC). The West Germanic group is characterized by a number of phonological and morphological innovations not found in North and East Germanic. The West Germanic varieties of the time are generally split into three dialect groups: Ingvaeonic (North Sea Germanic), Istvaeonic (Weser-Rhine Germanic) and Irminonic (Elbe Germanic). While each had its own distinct characteristics, there certainly must have still been a high degree of mutual intelligibility between these dialects. In fact, it is unclear whether the West Germanic continuum of this time period, or indeed Franconian itself, should still be considered a single language or that it should be considered a collection of similar dialects.

In any case, it appears that the Frankish tribes, or the later Franks, fit primarily into the Istvaeonic dialect group, with certain Ingvaeonic influences towards the northwest (still seen in modern Dutch), and more Irminonic (High German) influences towards the southeast.

=== Salian and Ripuarian Franks (210–500) ===
The scholarly consensus concerning the Migration Period is that the Frankish identity emerged during the first half of the 3rd century out of various earlier, smaller Germanic groups, including the Salii, Sicambri, Chamavi, Bructeri, Chatti, Chattuarii, Ampsivarii, Tencteri, Ubii, Batavi, and Tungri. It is speculated that these tribes originally spoke a range of related Istvaeonic dialects in the West Germanic branch of Proto-Germanic. Sometime in the 4th or 5th centuries, it becomes appropriate to speak of Old Franconian rather than an Istvaeonic dialect of Proto-Germanic.

Bergakker inscription

Very little is known about what the language was like during this period. One older runic sentence (dating from around 425–450 AD) is on the sword sheath of Bergakker which is either the singular direct attestation of the Old Franconian language or the earliest attestation of Old Low Franconian (Old Dutch) language. Another early sentence from the early 6th century AD (that is described as the earliest sentence in Old Dutch as well) is found in the Lex Salica. This phrase was used to free a serf:

"Maltho thi afrio lito"
(I say, I free you, half-free.)

These are the earliest sentences yet found of Old Franconian.

The location of the Franks around 475 . "Les Francs rhénans" is the French term for "Ripuarian Franks".

During this early period, the Franks were divided politically and geographically into two groups: the Salian Franks and the Ripuarian Franks. The language (or set of dialects) spoken by the Salian Franks during this period is sometimes referred to as early "Old Low Franconian", and consisted of two groups: "Old West Low Franconian" and "Old East Low Franconian". The language (or set of dialects) spoken by the Ripuarian Franks are referred to just as Old Franconian dialects (or, by some, as Old Frankish dialects).

However, as already stated above, it may be more accurate to think of these dialects not as early Old Franconian but as Istvaeonic dialects in the West Germanic branch of Proto-Germanic.

=== Frankish Empire (500–900) ===
The Frankish conquests between 481 and 814

At around 500 AD the Franks probably spoke a range of related dialects and languages rather than a single uniform dialect or language. The language of both government and the Church was Latin.

== Area ==
=== Austrasia ===
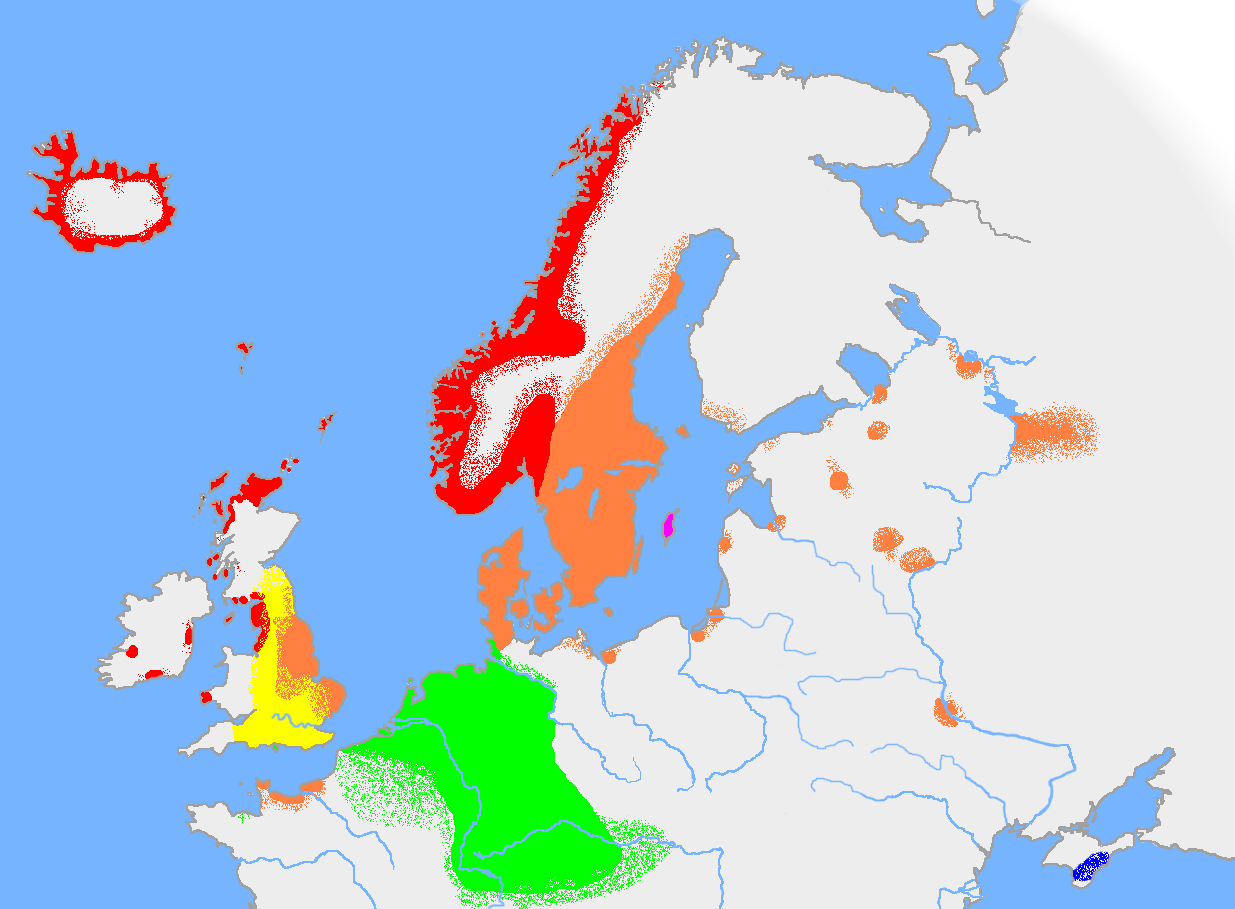
The approximate extent of Germanic languages in the early 10th century.: Old West Norse Old East Norse Old Gutnish Old English (West Germanic) Continental West Germanic languages (Old Frisian, Old Saxon, Old Dutch, Old High German). Crimean Gothic (East Germanic)

During the expansion into France and Germany, many Frankish people remained in the original core Frankish territories in the north (i.e. southern Netherlands, Flanders, a small part of northern France and the adjoining area in Germany centred on Cologne). The Franks united as a single group under Salian Frank leadership around 500 AD. Politically, the Ripuarian Franks existed as a separate group only until about 500 AD, after which they were subsumed into the Salian Franks. The Franks were united, but the various Frankish groups must have continued to live in the same areas, and speak the same dialects, although as a part of the growing Frankish Kingdom.

There must have been a close relationship between the various Franconian dialects. There was also a close relationship between Old Low Franconian (i.e. Old Dutch) and its neighbouring Old Saxon and Old Frisian languages and dialects to the north and northeast, as well as the related Old English (Anglo-Saxon) dialects spoken in southern and eastern Britain.

A widening cultural divide grew between the Franks remaining in the north and the rulers far to the south. Franks continued to reside in their original territories and to speak their original dialects and languages. It is not known what they called their language, but it is possible that they always called it "Diets" (i.e. "the people's language"), or something similar.

Philologists think of Old Dutch and Old West Low Franconian as being the same language. However, sometimes reference is made to a transition from the language spoken by the Salian Franks to Old Dutch. The language spoken by the Salian Franks must have developed significantly during the seven centuries from 200 to 900 AD. At some point the language spoken by the Franks must have become identifiably Dutch. Because Franconian texts are almost non-existent and Old Dutch texts scarce and fragmentary, it is difficult to determine when such a transition occurred, but it is thought to have happened by the end of the 9th century and perhaps earlier. By 900 AD the language spoken was recognisably an early form of Dutch, but that might also have been the case earlier. Old Dutch made the transition to Middle Dutch around 1150. A Dutch-French language boundary came into existence (but this was originally south of where it is today). Even though living in the original territory of the Franks, these Franks seem to have broken with the endonym "Frank" around the 9th century. By this time the Frankish identity had changed from an ethnic identity to a national identity, becoming localized and confined to the modern Franconia in Germany and principally to the French province of Île-de-France.

=== Gaul ===
The Franks expanded south into Gaul. Although the Franks would eventually conquer all of Gaul, speakers of Old Franconian apparently expanded in sufficient numbers only into northern Gaul to have a linguistic effect. For several centuries, northern Gaul was a bilingual territory (Vulgar Latin and Franconian). The language used in writing, in government and by the Church was Latin. Eventually, the Franks who had settled more to the south of this area in northern Gaul started adopting the Vulgar Latin of the local population. This Vulgar Latin language acquired the name of the people who came to speak it (Frankish or Français); north of the French-Dutch language boundary, the language was no longer referred to as "Frankish" (if it ever was referred to as such) but rather came to be referred to as "Diets", i.e. the "people's language". Urban T. Holmes has proposed that a Germanic language continued to be spoken as a second tongue by public officials in western Austrasia and Neustria as late as the 850s, and that it completely disappeared as a spoken language from these regions only during the 10th century.

=== German Franconia ===
The Franks also expanded their rule southeast into parts of Germany. Their language had some influence on local dialects, especially for terms relating to warfare. However, since the language of both the administration and the Church was Latin, this unification did not lead to the development of a supra-regional variety of Franconian nor a standardized German language. At the same time that the Franks were expanding southeast into what is now southern Germany, there were linguistic changes taking place in the region. The High German consonant shift (or second Germanic consonant shift) was a phonological development (sound change) that took place in the southern parts of the West Germanic dialect continuum in several phases, probably beginning between the 3rd and 5th centuries AD, and was almost complete before the earliest written records in the High German language were made in the 9th century. The resulting language, Old High German, can be neatly contrasted with Low Franconian, which for the most part did not experience the shift.

== Franconian languages ==
The set of dialects of the Franks who continued to live in their original territory in the Low Countries eventually developed in three different ways and eventually formed three modern branches of Franconian languages.

- The dialects spoken by the Salian Franks in the Low Countries (Old Dutch, also referred to as Old West Low Franconian) developed into the Dutch language, which itself has a number of distinct dialects. Afrikaans developed from early Modern Dutch's Hollandic dialect spoken in the Cape Colony.
- The Old East Low Franconian dialects are represented today in Limburgish. Old Limburgish continued to develop under heavy Low Rhenish and Dutch influence which gradually made it more mutually intelligible with neighboring varieties. Since the incorporation of Limburg into the Dutch state in the late 16th century, Limburgish has experienced heavy influence from Dutch, to the point where the two are today mutually intelligible to a significant degree. Modern Limburgish is therefore variously classified as either a separate language or a distinct dialect of Dutch, as is the case in Dutch linguistics. In German linguistics, Limburgish is considered a Low Rhenish or Meuse-Rhenish dialect, along with Luxembourgish. Limburgish itself has a number of dialects.
- It is speculated that the dialects originally spoken by the Ripuarian Franks in Germany possibly developed into, or were subsumed under, the German dialects called the Central Franconian dialects (Ripuarian Franconian, Moselle Franconian and Rhenish Franconian). These languages and dialects were later affected by serious language changes (such as the High German consonant shift), which resulted in the emergence of dialects that are now considered German dialects. Today, the Central Franconian dialects are spoken in the core territory of the Ripuarian Franks. Although there may not be definite proof to say that the dialects of the Ripuarian Franks (about which very little is known) developed into the Central Franconian dialects, there are—apart from mere probability—some pieces of evidence, most importantly the development -hs → ss and the loss of n before spirants, which is found throughout Central Franconian but nowhere else in High German. Compare Luxembourgish Uess ("ox"), Dutch os, German Ochse; and (dated) Luxembourgish Gaus ("goose"), Old Dutch gās, German Gans. The language spoken by Charlemagne was probably the dialect that later developed into the Ripuarian Franconian dialect.

The Frankish Empire later extended throughout neighbouring France and Germany. The language of the Franks had some influence on the local languages (especially in France), but never took hold as a standard language because Latin was the international language at the time. However, the language of the Franks did not develop into the lingua franca.

The Franks conquered adjoining territories of Germany (including the territory of the Allemanni). The Frankish legacy survives in these areas, for example, in the names of the city of Frankfurt and the area of Franconia. The Franks brought their language with them from their original territory and, as in France, it must have had an effect on the local dialects and languages. However, it is relatively difficult for linguists today to determine what features of these dialects are due to Frankish influence, because the latter was in large parts obscured, or even overwhelmed, by later developments.

== Influence on Old French and Middle Latin ==
Most French words of Germanic origin came from Frankish often replacing the Latin word which would have been used. It is estimated that modern French took approximately 1000 stem words from Old Franconian. Many of these words were concerned with agriculture (e.g. French: jardin "garden"), war (e.g. French: guerre "war") or social organization (e.g. French: baron "baron"). Old Franconian has introduced the modern French word for the nation, France (Francia), meaning "land of the Franks". The hypothesis by which the name for the Paris region, Île-de-France was also given by the Franks based on the reinterpretation of PG *lutilaz 'small' is phonetically implossible since the ninth-century Pariser Gespräche clearly indicates luzzil glossed paru[um] 'small' as the local pronunciation.

The influence of Franconian on French is decisive for the birth of the early Langue d'oïl compared to the other Romance languages, that appeared later such as Langue d'oc, Romanian, Portuguese and Catalan, Italian, etc., because its influence was greater than the respective influence of Visigothic and Lombardic (both Germanic languages) on the langue d'oc, the Romance languages of Iberia, and Italian. Not all of these loanwords have been retained in modern French. French has also passed on words of Franconian origin to other Romance languages, and to English.

Old Franconian has also left many etyma in the different Northern Langues d'oïls such as Picard, Champenois, Bas-Lorrain and Walloon, more than in Common French, and not always the same ones.

See below a non-exhaustive list of French words of Frankish origin. An asterisk prefixing a term indicates a reconstructed form of the Frankish word. Most Franconian words with the phoneme w changed it to gu when entering Old French and other Romance languages; however, the northern langue d'oïl dialects such as Picard, Northern Norman, Walloon, Burgundian, Champenois and Bas-Lorrain retained the [w] or turned it into [v]. Perhaps the best known example is the Franconian *werra ("war" < Old Northern French werre, compare Old High German werre "quarrel"), which entered modern French as guerre and guerra in Italian, Occitan, Catalan, Spanish and Portuguese. Other examples include "gant" ("gauntlet", from *want) and "garder" ("to guard", from *wardōn). Franconian words starting with s before another consonant developed it into es- (e.g. Franconian skirm and Old French escremie > Old Italian scrimia > Modern French escrime).

Current French word	Old Franconian	Dutch or other Germanic cognates	Latin/Romance
affranchir "to free"	*frank "freeborn; unsubjugated, answering to no one", nasalized variant of *frāki "rash, untamed, impudent"	Du frank "unforced, sincere, frank", vrank "carefree, brazen", Du frank en vrij (idiom) "free as air" Du Frankrijk "France", Du vrek "miser", OHG franko "free man" Norwegian: frekk "rude"	L līberāre
alène "awl" (Sp alesna, It lesina)	*alisna	MDu elsene, else, Du els	L sūbula
alise "whitebeam berry" (OFr alis, alie "whitebeam")	*alísō "alder"	MDu elze, Du els "alder" (vs. G Erle "alder"); Du elsbes "whitebeam", G Else "id."	non-native to the Mediterranean
baron	*baro "freeman", "bare of duties"	MDu baren "to give birth", Du bar "gravely", "bare", OHG baro "freeman", OE beorn "noble"	Germanic cultural import Late, Vulgar, and Medieval Latin *baro
bâtard "bastard" (FrProv bâsco)	*bāst "marriage"	MDu bast "lust, heat, reproductive season", WFris boaste, boask "marriage"	L nothus
bâtir "to build" (OFr bastir "to baste, tie together") bâtiment "building" bastille "fortress" bastion "fortress"	*bastian "to bind with bast string"	MDu besten "to sew up, to connect", OHG bestan "to mend, patch", NHG basteln "to tinker"; MDu best "liaison" (Du gemenebest "commonwealth")	L construere (It costruire)
bière "beer"	*bera	Du bier	L cervisia(celtic)
blanc, blanche "white"	*blank	Du blinken "to shine", blank "white, shining"	L albus
bleu "blue" (OFr blou, bleve)	*blao	MDu blā, blau, blaeuw, Du blauw	L caeruleus "light blue", lividus "dark blue"
bois "wood, forest"	*busk "bush, underbrush"	MDu bosch, busch, Du bos "forest", "bush"	L silva "forest" (OFr selve), L lignum "wood" (OFr lein)
bourg "town/city"	*burg or *burc "fortified settlement"	ODu burg, MDu burcht Got. baurg OHG burg OE burh, OLG burg, ON borg	L urbs "fortified city", Late Latin burgus
broder "to embroider" (OFr brosder, broisder)	*brosdōn, blend of *borst "bristle" and *brordōn "to embroider"	G Borste "boar bristle", Du borstel "bristle"; OS brordōn "to embroider, decorate", brord "needle"	L pingere "to paint; embroider" (Fr peindre "to paint")
broyer "to grind, crush" (OFr brier)	*brekan "to break"	Du breken "to break",	LL tritāre (Occ trissar "to grind", but Fr trier "to sort"), LL pistāre (It pestare "to pound, crush", OFr pester), L machīnare (Dalm maknur "to grind", Rom măcina, It macinare)
brun "brown"	*brūn	MDu brun and Du bruin "brown"	
choquer "to shock"	*skukjan	Du schokken "to shock, to shake"	
choisir "to choose"	*kiosan	MDu kiesen, Du kiezen, keuze	L eligēre (Fr élire "to elect"), VL exeligēre (cf. It scegliere), excolligere (Cat escollir, Sp escoger, Pg escolher)
chouette "barn owl" (OFr çuete, dim. of choë, choue "jackdaw")	*kōwa, kāwa "chough, jackdaw"	MDu couwe "rook", Du kauw, kaauw "chough"	not distinguished in Latin: L būbō "owl", ōtus "eared owl", ulula "screech owl", ulucus likewise "screech owl" (cf. Sp loco "crazy"), noctua "night owl"
cresson "watercress"	*kresso	MDu kersse, korsse, Du kers, dial. kors	L nasturtium, LL berula (but Fr berle "water parsnip")
danser "to dance" (OFr dancier)	*dansōn	OHG dansōn "to drag along, trail"; further to MDu densen, deinsen "to shrink back", Du deinzen "to stir; move away, back up", OHG dinsan "to pull, stretch"	LL ballare (OFr baller, It ballare, Pg bailar)
déchirer "to rip, tear" (OFr escirer)	*skerian "to cut, shear"	MDu scēren, Du scheren "to shave, shear", scheuren "to tear"	VL extractiāre (Prov estraçar, It stracciare), VL exquartiare "to rip into fours" (It squarciare, but Fr écarter "to move apart, distance"), exquintiare "to rip into five" (Cat/Occ esquinçar)
dérober "to steal, reave" (OFr rober, Sp robar)	*rōbon "to steal"	MDu rōven, Du roven "to rob"	VL furicare "to steal" (It frugare)
écang "swingle-dag, tool for beating fibrous stems"	*swank "bat, rod"	MDu swanc "wand, rod", Du (dial. Holland) zwang "rod"	L pistillum (Fr dial. pesselle "swingle-dag")
écran "screen" (OFr escran)	*skrank	MDu schrank "chassis"; G Schrank "cupboard", Schranke "fence"	L obex
écrevisse "crayfish" (OFr crevice)	*krebit	Du kreeft "crayfish, lobster"	L cammārus "crayfish" (cf. Occ chambre, It gambero, Pg camarão)
éperon "spur" (OFr esporon)	*sporo	MDu spōre, Du spoor	L calcar
épier "to watch" Old French espie "male spy",, Modern French espion is from Italian	*spehōn "to spy"	Du spieden, bespieden "to spy", HG spähen "to peer, to peek, to scout",	
escrime "fencing" < Old Italian scrimia < OFr escremie from escremir "fight"	*skirm "to protect"	Du schermen "to fence", scherm "(protective) screen", bescherming "protection", afscherming "shielding"	
étrier "stirrup" (OFr estrieu, estrief)	*stīgarēp, from stīgan "to go up, to mount" and rēp "band"	MDu steegereep, Du stijgreep, stijgen "to rise", steigeren	LL stapia (later ML stapēs), ML saltatorium (cf. MFr saultoir)
flèche "arrow"	*fliukka	Du vliek "arrow feather", MDu vliecke, OS fliuca (MLG fliecke "long arrow")	L sagitta (OFr saete, It saetta, Pg seta)
frais "fresh" (OFr freis, fresche)	*friska "fresh"	Du vers "fresh", fris "cold", German frisch	
franc "free, exempt; straightforward, without hassle" (LL francus "freeborn, freedman"); France "France" (OFr Francia) franchement "frankly"	*frank "freeborn; unsubjugated, answering to no one", nasalized variant of *frāki "rash, untamed, impudent"	MDu vrec "insolent", Du frank "unforced, sincere, frank", vrank "carefree, brazen", Du Frankrijk "France", Du vrek "miser", OHG franko "free man"	L ingenuus "freeborn" L Gallia
frapper "to hit, strike" (OFr fraper)	*hrapan "to jerk, snatch"	Du rapen "gather up, collect", G raffen "to grab"	L ferire (OFr ferir)
frelon "hornet" (OFr furlone, ML fursleone)	*hurslo	MDu horsel, Du horzel	L crābrō (cf. It calabrone)
freux "rook" (OFr frox, fru)	*hrōk	MDu roec, Du roek	not distinguished in Latin
galoper "to gallop"	*wala hlaupan "to run well"	Du wel "good, well" + lopen "to run"	
garder "to guard"	*wardōn	MDu waerden "to defend", OS wardōn	L cavere, servare
gant "gauntlet"	*want	Du want "glove"	
givre "frost (substance)"	*gibara "drool, slobber"	EFris gever, LG Geiber, G Geifer "drool, slobber"	L gelū (cf. Fr gel "frost (event); freezing")
glisser "to slip" (OFr glier)	*glīdan "to glide"	MDu glīden, Du glijden "to glide"; Du glis "skid"; G gleiten, Gleis "track"	ML planare
grappe "bunch (of grapes)" (OFr crape, grape "hook, grape stalk")	*krāppa "hook"	MDu crappe "hook", Du (dial. Holland) krap "krank", G Krapfe "hook", (dial. Franconian) Krape "torture clamp, vice"	L racemus (Prov rasim "bunch", Cat raïm, Sp racimo, but Fr raisin "grape")
gris "grey"	*grîs "grey"	Du grijs "grey"	L cinereus "ash-coloured, grey"
guenchir "to turn aside, avoid"	*wenkjan	Du wenken "to beckon", OS wenkian "to defect, become unfaithful", OHG wenchen "to bend, buckle, warp"	
guérir "to heal, cure" (OFr garir "to defend") guérison "healing" (OFr garrison "healing")	*warjan "to protect, defend"	MDu weeren, Du weren "to protect, defend", Du bewaren "to keep, preserve"	L sānāre (Sard sanare, Sp/Pg sanar, OFr saner), medicāre (Dalm medcuar "to heal")
guerre "war"	*werra "war"	Du war or wirwar "tangle", verwarren "to confuse"	L bellum
guigne "heart cherry" (OFr guisne)	*wīksina	G Weichsel "sour cherry", (dial. Rhine Franconian) Waingsl, (dial. East Franconian) Wassen, Wachsen	non-native to the Mediterranean
haïr "to hate" (OFr hadir "to hate") haine "hatred" (OFr haïne "hatred")	*hatjan	Du haten "to hate", haat "hatred"	L ōdī "to hate", odium "hatred"
hanneton "cockchafer"	*hāno "rooster" + -eto (diminutive suffix) with sense of "beetle, weevil"	Du haan "rooster", leliehaantje "lily beetle", bladhaantje "leaf beetle", G Hahn "rooster", (dial. Rhine Franconian) Hahn "sloe bug, shield bug", Lilienhähnchen "lily beetle"	LL bruchus "chafer" (cf. Fr dial. brgue, beùrgne, brégue), cossus (cf. SwRom coss, OFr cosson "weevil")
haubert "hauberk"	*halsberg "neck-cover"	Du hals "neck" + berg "cover" (cf Du herberg "hostel")	L lorica
héron "heron"	*heigero, variant of *hraigro	MDu heiger "heron", Du reiger "heron"	L ardea
houx "holly"	*hulis	MDu huls, Du hulst	L aquifolium (Sp acebo), later VL acrifolium (Occ grefuèlh, agreu, Cat grèvol, It agrifoglio)
jardin "garden" (VL hortus gardinus "enclosed garden", Ofr jardin, jart)	*gardo "garden"	Du gaard "garden", boomgaard "orchard"; OS gardo "garden"	L hortus
lécher "to lick" (OFr lechier "to live in debauchery")	*leccōn "to lick"	MDu lecken, Du likken "to lick"	L lingere (Sard línghere), lambere (Sp lamer, Pg lamber)
maçon "bricklayer" (OFr masson, machun)	*mattio "mason"	Du metsen "to mason", metselaar "masoner"; OHG mezzo "stonemason", meizan "to beat, cut", G Metz, Steinmetz "mason"	VL murator (Occ murador, Sard muradore, It muratóre)
maint "many" (OFr maint, meint "many")	*menigþa "many"	Du menig "many", menigte "group of people"	
marais "marsh, swamp"	*marisk "marsh"	MDu marasch, meresch, maersc, Du meers "wet grassland", (dial. Holland) mars	L paludem (Occ palun, It palude)
maréchal "marshal" maréchausse "military police"	*marh-skalk "horse-servant"	ODu marscalk "horse-servant" (marchi "mare" + skalk "servant"); MDu marscalc "horse-servant, royal servant" (mare "mare" + skalk "serf"); Du maarschalk "marshal" (merrie "mare" + schalk "comic", schalks "teasingly")	
nord "north"	*Nortgouue (790–793 A.D.) "north" + "frankish district" (Du gouw, Deu Gau, Fri/LSax Go)	Du noord or noorden "north", Du Henegouwen (province of Hainaut)	L septemtrio(nes) / septentrio(nes) "north, north wind, northern regions, (pl.) seven stars near the north pole", boreas "north wind, north", aquilo "stormy wind, north wind, north", aquilonium "northerly regions, north"
osier "osier (basket willow); withy" (OFr osière, ML auseria)	*halster	MDu halster, LG dial. Halster, Hilster "bay willow"	L vīmen "withy" (It vimine "withy", Sp mimbre, vimbre "osier", Pg vimeiro, Cat vímet "withy"), vinculum (It vinco "osier", dial. vinchio, Friul venc)
patte "paw"	*pata "foot sole"	Du poot "paw", Du pets "strike"; LG Pad "sole of the foot"; further to G Patsche "instrument for striking the hand", Patschfuss "web foot", patschen "to dabble", (dial. Bavarian) patzen "to blot, pat, stain"	Vulg L pauta, LL branca "paw" (Sard brànca, It brince, Rom brîncă, Prov branca, Romansh franka, but Fr branche "treelimb"), see also Deu Pranke
poche "pocket"	*poka "pouch"	MDu poke, G dial. Pfoch "pouch, change purse"	L bulga "leather bag" (Fr bouge "bulge"), LL bursa "coin purse" (Fr bourse "money pouch, purse", It bórsa, Sp/Pg bolsa)
riche "rich"	*riki "rich"	MDu rike, Du rijk "kingdom", "rich"	L dives
sale "dirty"	*salo "pale, sallow"	MDu salu, saluwe "discolored, dirty", Du (old) zaluw "tawny"	L succidus (cf. It sudicio, Sp sucio, Pg sujo, Ladin scich, Friul soç)
salle "room"	*sala "hall, room"	ODu zele "house made with sawn beams", Many place names: "Melsele", "Broeksele" (Brussels) etc.	
saule "willow"	*salha "sallow, pussy willow"	OHG salaha, G Salweide "pussy willow", OE sealh	L salix "willow" (OFr sauz, sausse)
saisir "to seize, snatch; bring suit, vest a court" (ML sacīre "to lay claim to, appropriate")	*sakan "to take legal action"	Du zeiken "to nag, to quarrel", zaak "court case", OS sakan "to accuse", OHG sahhan "to strive, quarrel, rebuke", OE sacan "to quarrel, claim by law, accuse";	VL aderigere (OFr aerdre "to seize")
standard "standard" (OFr estandart "standard")	*standhard "stand hard, stand firm"	Du staan (to stand) + hard "hard"	
tamis "sieve" (It tamigio)	*tamisa	MDu temse, teemse, obs. Du teems "sifter"	L crībrum (Fr crible "riddle, sift")
tomber "to fall" (OFr tumer "to somersault")	*tūmōn "to tumble"	Du tuimelen "to tumble", OS/OHG tūmōn "to tumble",	L cadere (obsolete Fr cheoir)
trêve "truce"	*treuwa "loyalty, agreement"	Du trouw "faithfulness, loyalty"	L pausa (Fr pause)
troène "privet" (dialectal truèle, ML trūlla)	*trugil "hard wood; small trough"	OHG trugilboum, harttrugil "dogwood; privet", G Hartriegel "dogwood", dialectally "privet", (dial. Eastern) Trögel, archaic (dial. Swabian) Trügel "small trough, trunk, basin"	L ligustrum
tuyau "pipe, hose" (OFr tuiel, tuel)	*þūta	MDu tūte "nipple; pipe", Du tuit "spout, nozzle", OE þwēot "channel; canal"	L canna "reed; pipe" (It/SwRom/FrProv cana "pipe")

=== Old French ===
Franconian speech habits are also responsible for the replacement of Latin cum ("with") with od ← apud "at", then with avuec ← apud hoc "at it" ≠ Italian, Spanish con) in Old French (Modern French avec), and for the preservation of Latin nominative homo "man" as an impersonal pronoun: cf. homme ← hominem "man (accusative)" and Old French hum, hom, om → modern on, "one" (compare Dutch man "man" and men, "one").

=== Middle English ===
Middle English also adopted many words with Franconian roots from Old French; e.g. random (via Old French randon, Old French verb randir, from *rant "a running"), standard (via Old French estandart, from *standhard "stand firm"), scabbard (via Anglo-French *escauberc, from *skar-berg), grape, stale, march (via Old French marche, from *marka) among others.

== See also ==
- Franconian languages
- History of French
- List of French words of Germanic origin
- List of Portuguese words of Franconian origin
- List of Spanish words of Franconian origin
- Low Franconian languages
- Old High German
