= Low German (disambiguation) =

Low German is a Germanic language spoken mainly in Northern Germany and in Northeastern Netherlands.

- East Low German, a group of dialects spoken in north-eastern Germany and northern Poland
- Mennonite Low German, a language or group of dialects spoken by Mennonites
- Middle Low German, a language spoken from about 1100 to 1600
- Old Low German, a language documented from the 8th until the 12th century
- West Low German, a group of dialects spoken in northwest Germany, The Netherlands, and Denmark
- Low Germanic, term used by the German linguist Theo Vennemann in his controversial classification of the Germanic languages
- Low German (school subject), a school subject taught in Northern Germany

== Other uses ==
- Low German house, a type of German timber-framed farmhouse
- Sometimes used to refer to parts of Northern Germany, as distinct from the highlands in the south of Germany
