= Dietsch (surname) =

Dietsch, Dietsche or Dietschy is a surname of Middle Dutch, Afrikaans and Flemish-Belgian origin, meaning "The (Germanic) peoples". Notable people with the surname include:

- Guillaume Dietsch (born 2001), French footballer
- Mike Dietsch (1942–2014), Canadian politician
- Pierre-Louis Dietsch (1808–1865), French composer
- Waltraud Dietsch (born 1950), German sprinter
