= Bergakker inscription =

Inscription discovered on the scabbard of a 5th-century sword

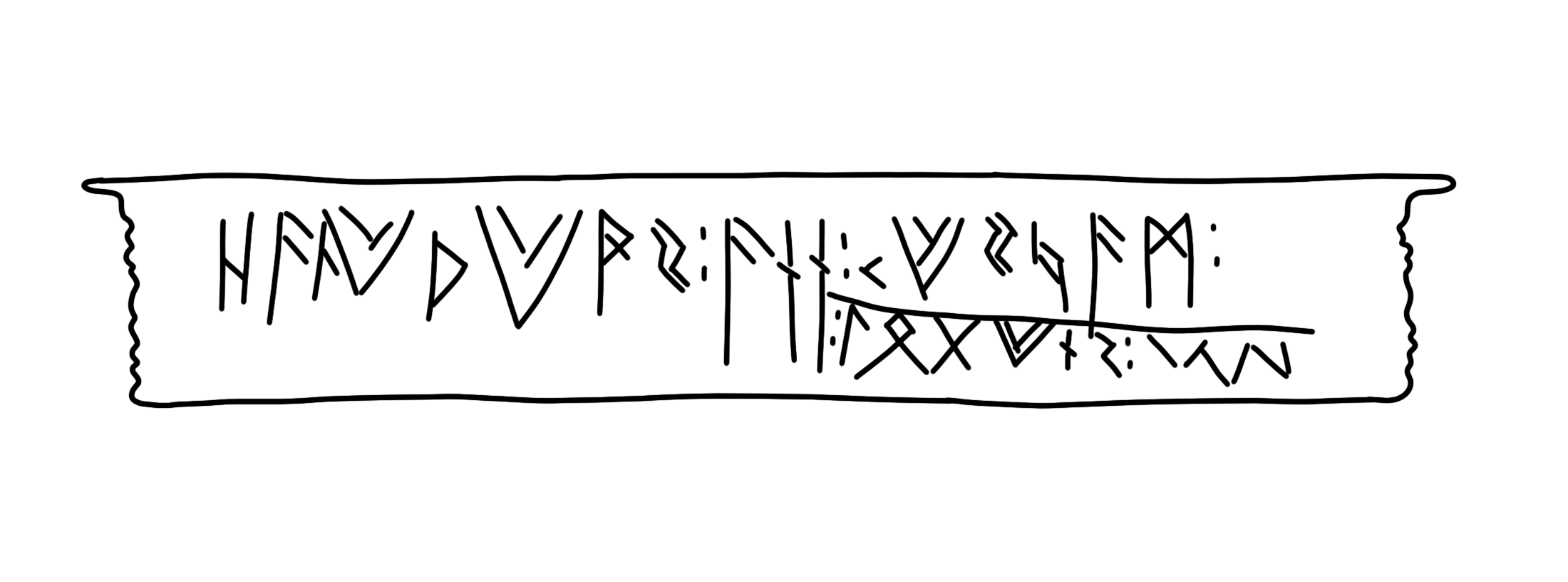
Visual copy of the Elder Futhark runes on the inscription.

The Bergakker inscription is an Elder Futhark inscription discovered on the scabbard of a 5th-century sword. It was found in 1996 in the Dutch town of Bergakker, in the Betuwe, a region once inhabited by the Batavi. There is consensus that the find dates from the period 425-475 and that the inscription is either the singular direct attestation of Frankish (Franconian), or the earliest attestation of Old Dutch (Old Low Franconian).

== Inscription ==
Runic writing at the time was used along the North Sea coast, in Frisia, but there are very few other extant inscriptions from Francia. The inscription can be read as

ᚺᚨ?[V]ᚦ[V]**ᛋ ᛬ ᚨᚾᚾ ᛬ ᚲ[V]ᛋᛃᚨᛗ ᛬
h(a?)þ(V)**s : ann : k(V)sjam :

᛬ ᛚᛟᚷ[V]ᚾᛋ ᛬
: log(V)ns :

where V is a non-standard rune, apparently a vowel (variously read as e or u, or as "any vowel"), and * represents an unknown rune.

Several readings have been presented in literature. There seems to be a consensus that the ann is the past tense of unnan, corresponding to Modern Dutch gunnen, which means "give/bestow/grant". Several authors read the first word as a personal name in the genitive (indicating property), and the last word as meaning "flame, brand", a kenning for swords. The third word is read either as kusjam, meaning "chooser" or "chosen", corresponding to Modern Dutch keuze, or as ke(i)sjam meaning "cut" or "cutter", also referring to swords or sword wielders.

=== Scholarly interpretations ===
Interpreter	Transliteration	Translation	Notes
Quak (2000)	Ha(þu)þ[e]was ann k(u)sjam log(u)ns	"[property] of Haþuþewaz. I bestow upon the choosers of the swords"	
Bosman & Looijenga (1996)	haþeþewas: ann: kesjam: logens:		no interpretation given
Looijenga (1999)	haleþew͡as:ann:kesjam:logens:	possession of H. [Haleþewas = Spear-warrior], he grants the sword-fighters swords	inspected before by Bosman - Looijenga (1996)
Vennemann (1999)	ha.uþu.s : ann : kusjam : loguns : ha[.u]þurs : ann : kusjam : / : loguns	(ich bin) Hathurs (Eigentum) (ich) gewähre Schwertklingen Unterkunft "(I am) Hathur's (property) (I) grant sword-blades accommodation"	
Seebold (1999)	haauþuwas : ann : kusjam :: loguns :	ich gewähre des Kampfes den Wählern des Schwertes "I grant combat to the choosers of the sword"	
Odenstedt (1999)	haleþew͡as : ann : kesjam :/: logens : xx	I (= the sword) like healthy servants (soldiers). I place (inflict) wounds.	
Bammesberger (1999)	haþ?þ?ras : ann : k?s?am log?n? :	ich gewähre [or: er gewährt] dem Haþuþur und seiner Erwählten die Heiratsrune (= Heiratskunde) "I grant [or: he grants] to Haþuþur and his chosen [bride] the wedding-rune"	
Mees (2002)	haþ̣ụþụw͡as : ann : kụsjam : : logụns : Haþuþȳwas. Ann kusjam logūns.	Haþuþyw's. I/He grant(s) a flame (i.e. brand, sword) to the select.	
Grünzweig (2004)	haþuþuw͡as:ann:kusjam:loguns:	H.s (Besitz) [ob Genitiv oder Nominativ bleibe dahin gestellt]; er gewährt (läßt zukommen) den Wählenden (Feinden?) die Flamme (das Schwert?) "H.s (property); he grants the choosers [enemies?] the flame [the sword?]"	

=== Graphemic peculiarities ===
The text features graphemic peculiarities that have led to ongoing scholarly debate. Modern imaging and analysis suggest that the first rune may have been misidentified in earlier publications, complicating the reading of the opening word. The inscription also contains double-lined and unusual runes not found in other Elder Futhark examples, prompting caution in transliteration and highlighting the complexity of the text.

== See also ==
- List of runestones

== Sources ==
- Bammesberger, Alfred. Die Runeninschrift von Bergakker: Versuch einer Deutung, in: Pforzen und Bergakker. Neue Untersuchungen zu Runeninschriften, edited by Alfred Bammesberger in editorial collaboration with Gaby Waxenberger, Göttingen 1999 (= Historische Sprachforschung (Historical Linguistics): Ergänzungsheft 41, edited by Alfred Bammesberger and Günter Neumann), 180–185.
- Bosman, A.V.A.J, & Looijenga, T. A runic inscription from Bergakker (Gelderland), the Netherlands, in: Amsterdamer Beiträge zur älteren Germanistik, 46, 1996, 9–16.
- Grünzweig, Friedrich E. Runeninschriften auf Waffen. Inschriften vom 2. Jahrhundert n. Chr. bis ins Hochmittelalter. Wien 2004 (= Wiener Studien zur Skandinavistik, 11).
- Looijenga, Tineke. The Bergakker Find and its Context, in: Pforzen und Bergakker. Neue Untersuchungen zu Runeninschriften, Göttingen 1999, 141–151.
- Mees, Bernard (2002). "The Bergakker Inscription and the Beginnings of Dutch". In Langbroek, Erika; Quak, Arend; Roeleveld, Annelies; Vermeyden, Paula (eds.). Amsterdamer Beiträge zur älteren Germanistik. Vol. 56. Amsterdam – New York, NY: Rodopi. pp. 23–26. ISBN 90-420-1579-9.
- Odenstedt, Bengt. The Bergakker Inscription: Transliteration, Interpretation, Message: Some Suggestions, in: Pforzen und Bergakker. Neue Untersuchungen zu Runeninschriften, Göttingen 1999, 163–173.
- Quak, Arend, 'Wieder nach Bergakker', in: Amsterdamer Beiträge zur älteren Germanistik, 53, 2000, 33–39.
- Robins, Jenny, 'A Possibly Misidentified Rune and Other Graphemic Peculiarities on the Bergakker Scabbard Mouthpiece', in: Interdisciplinary Journal for Germanic Linguistics and Semiotic Analysis University of California, Berkeley, 81‒112. 2019
- Seebold, Elmar. Die Runeninschrift von Bergakker, in: Pforzen und Bergakker. Neue Untersuchungen zu Runeninschriften, Göttingen 1999, 157–162.
- Vennemann, Theo. Note on the Runic Inscription of the Bergakker Scabbard Mount, in: Pforzen und Bergakker. Neue Untersuchungen zu Runeninschriften, Göttingen 1999, 152–156.
