= Bergakker =

- Hamlet
- Location in the Netherlands Bergakker (Netherlands)
- Coordinates: 51°53′N 5°23′E
- Country: Netherlands
- Province: Gelderland
- Municipality: Tiel

Area
  - Total: 3.51 km^{2} (1.36 sq mi)

Population (2008)
  - Total: 390
  - Density: 110/km^{2} (290/sq mi)
- Time zone: UTC+1 (CET)
  - Summer (DST): UTC+2 (CEST)

Bergakker is a hamlet in the Dutch province of Gelderland. It is a part of the municipality of Tiel, and lies about 2 km west of Tiel.

Bergakker is known for the Bergakker sword sheath, which was found in a field in 1996.

It was first mentioned in 1899 as Bergakker, and means "farmland on a hill". The hamlet consists of about 80 houses.
