= Old Dutch =

Indo-European language

- Old Low Franconian
- *Thiudisc
- Pronunciation: [ˈθiu̯.disk]
- Native to: Holland, Austrasia, Zeeland and Flanders
- Region: The Low Countries
- Era: Gradually developed into Middle Dutch by mid-12th century
- Language family: Indo-European: Germanic; West Germanic; Weser–Rhine Germanic; Old Dutch
- Early forms: Proto-Indo-European: Proto-Germanic; Frankish
- Writing system: Runes, Latin (later)

Language codes
- ISO 639-3: odt
- Glottolog: oldd1237 oldd1238
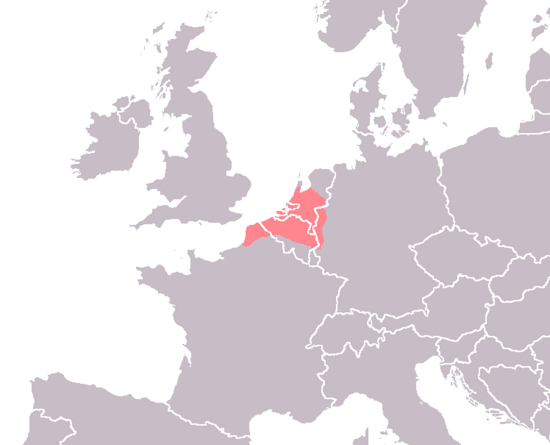
- The areas where the Old Dutch language was spoken

In linguistics, Old Dutch (Modern Dutch: Oudnederlands) or Old Low Franconian (Modern Dutch: Oudnederfrankisch) is the set of dialects that evolved from Frankish spoken in the Low Countries during the Early Middle Ages, from around the 6th to the 12th century. Old Dutch is mostly recorded on fragmentary relics, and words have been reconstructed from Middle Dutch and Old Dutch loanwords in French.

Old Dutch is regarded as the primary stage in the development of a separate Dutch language. It was spoken by the descendants of the Salian Franks who occupied what is now the southern Netherlands, northern Belgium, part of northern France, and parts of the Lower Rhine regions of Germany. It evolved into Middle Dutch around the 12th century. The inhabitants of northern Dutch provinces, including Groningen, Friesland, and the coast of North Holland, spoke Old Frisian, and some in the east (Achterhoek, Overijssel, and Drenthe) instead spoke Old Saxon.

== Terminology ==
Within the field of historical philology, the terminology for the oldest historical phase of the Dutch language traditionally includes both Old Dutch as well as Old Low Franconian. In English linguistic publications, Old Netherlandic is occasionally used in addition to the aforementioned terms.

Old Low Franconian, derives from the linguistic category first devised by the German linguist Wilhelm Braune (1850–1926), who used the term Franconian as a wastebasket taxon for the early West Germanic texts that he could not readily classify as belonging to either Saxon, Alemannic or Bavarian and assumed to derive from the language of the Franks. He subsequently further divided this new grouping into Low, Middle and High Franconian based on the absence or presence of the Second Germanic consonant shift. With the exception of Dutch, modern linguistic research has challenged the direct diachronical connection to Old Frankish for most of the varieties grouped under the broader "Franconian" category. Nevertheless, the traditional terminology of the West Germanic varieties along assumed Late Classical tribal lines, typical of 19th and early 20th century Germanic linguistics, remains common.

Within historical linguistics Old Low Franconian is synonymous with Old Dutch. Depending on the author, the temporal boundary between Old Dutch and Old Frankish is either defined by the onset of the Second Germanic consonant shift in Eastern Frankish, the assimilation of an unattested coastal dialect showing North Sea Germanic-features by West Frankish during the closing of the 9th century, or a combination of both. Some linguists use the terms Old Low Franconian or West Frankish to specifically refer to the (very sparsely attested) varieties of Old Dutch spoken prior to its assimilation of the coastal dialect.

Old Dutch itself is further divided into Old West Dutch and Old East Dutch, with the descendants of Old West Dutch forming the dominant basis of the Middle Dutch literary language and Old East Dutch forming a noticeable substrate within the easternmost Dutch dialects, such as Limburgish.

== Origins and characteristics ==
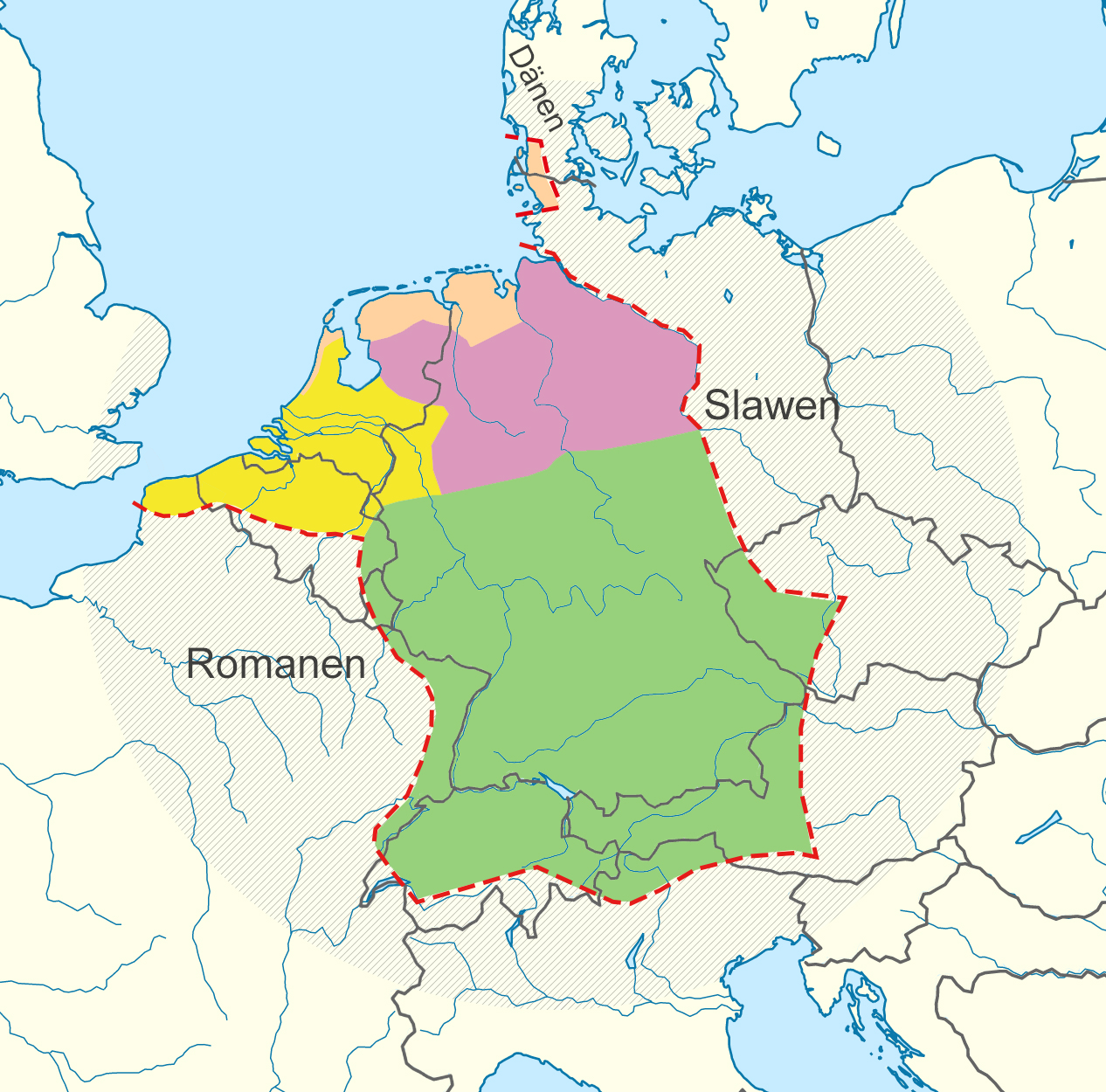
The approximate extent of continental West Germanic languages in the early 10th century: Old Dutch Old High German Old Frisian Old Saxon Line marking the boundaries of the continental West Germanic dialect continuum

Before the advent of Old Dutch or any of the Germanic languages, Germanic dialects were mutually intelligible. The North Sea Germanic languages were spoken in the whole of the coastal parts of the Netherlands and Belgium. Old Frisian was one of these languages, and elements of it survived through the Frisian language, spoken in the province of Friesland in the North of the Netherlands. In the rest of the coastal region, these languages were mostly displaced following the withdrawal to England of the migrating Angles, Saxons and Jutes, who gave rise to Old English.

It was largely replaced by Weser–Rhine Germanic dialects, spoken by the Salian Franks. It spread from northern Belgium and the southern Netherlands to the coast and evolved into Old Dutch. It has, however, a North sea Germanic substrate. Linguists typically date this transition to around the 5th century.

=== Relation with other West Germanic languages ===
==== Central Franconian and Old High German ====
Old Dutch is divided into Old West Low Franconian and Old East Low Franconian (Limburgian); however, these varieties are very closely related, the divergence being that the latter shares more traits with neighboring historical forms of Central Franconian dialects such as Ripuarian and Moselle Franconian. While both forms of Low Franconian were instrumental to the framing of Middle Dutch, Old East Low Franconian did not contribute much to Standard Dutch, which is based on the consolidated dialects of Holland and Brabant.

During the Merovingian period, the Central Franconian dialects were influenced by Old Low Franconian (Old Dutch), resulting in certain linguistic loans which yielded a slight overlap of vocabulary, most of which relates to warfare. In addition is the subsumption of the High German consonant shift, a set of phonological changes beginning around the 5th or 6th century that did not influence Old Dutch but extensively influenced Central Franconian and other Old High German dialects.

==== Old Saxon, Old English and Old Frisian ====
Old English, Old Frisian and (to a lesser degree) Old Saxon share the application of the Ingvaeonic nasal spirant law. Old Dutch was considerably less affected than those other three languages, but a dialect continuum formed/existed between Old Dutch, Old Saxon and Old Frisian. Despite sharing some particular features, a number of disparities separate Old Saxon, Old Frisian, Old English and Old Dutch. One such difference is that Old Dutch used -a as its plural a-stem noun ending, while Old Saxon and Old English employed -as or -os. Much of the grammatical variation between Old Dutch and Old Saxon is similar to that between Old Dutch and Old High German.

It is also found that Old Dutch had lost the dual number for its pronouns, unlike Old English, which used wit to refer to "the two of us". Old Dutch would have used we both to refer to that and to refer to many more people in the "us" group, much like Modern Dutch and English.

=== Relation to Middle Dutch ===
Old Dutch naturally evolved into Middle Dutch with some distinctions that approximate those found in most medieval West Germanic languages. The year 1150 is often cited as the time of the discontinuity, but it actually marks a time of profuse Dutch writing whose language is patently different from Old Dutch.

The most notable difference between Old and Middle Dutch is vowel reduction. Back vowels (a, o) in non-stressed syllables are rather frequent in Old Dutch, but in Middle Dutch, they are reduced to a schwa:

| Old Dutch | Middle Dutch | English |
|---|---|---|
| vogala | vogele | bird (fowl) |
| daga / dago | daghe | days (nominative/genitive) |
| brecan | breken | to break |
| gescrivona | ghescreven | written (past participle) |

The following is a translation of Psalm 55:18, taken from the Wachtendonck Psalms; it shows the evolution of Dutch, from the original Old Dutch, written c. 900, to modern Dutch, but so accurately copies the Latin word order of the original that there is little information that can be garnered on Old Dutch syntax. In Modern Dutch, recasting is necessary to form a coherent sentence.

| Old Dutch | Irlōsin sal an frithe sēla mīna fan thēn thia ginācont mi, wanda under managon he was mit mi. |
| Middle Dutch | Erlosen sal hi in vrede siele mine van dien die genaken mi, want onder menegen hi was met mi. |
| Modern Dutch (with old word order) | Verlossen zal hij in vrede ziel mijn van zij die aanvallen mij, want onder menigen hij was met mij. |
| Modern Dutch (with new word order) | Hij zal mijn ziel verlossen in vrede van hen die mij aanvallen, want onder menigen was hij met mij. |
| English | He will deliver my soul in peace from those who attack me, for, amongst many, he was with me. |

== Surviving texts ==
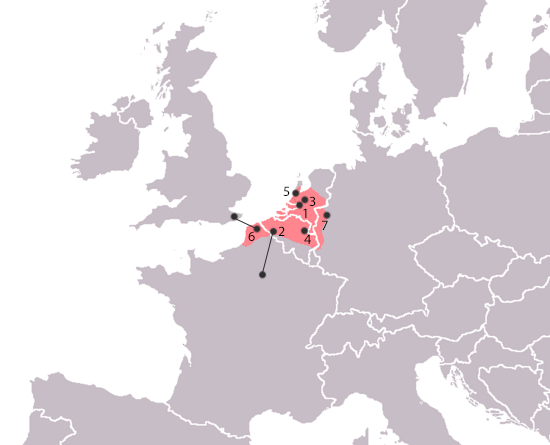
Discoveries of Old Dutch texts.: 1. Bergakker inscription; 2. Doornik (birthplace of Clovis I): Salic law; 3. Utrecht Baptismal Vow; 4. Munsterbilzen: Wachtendonck Psalms; 5. Egmond Willeram; 6. West Flanders: Hebban olla vogala; 7. Werden: Rhinelandic Rhyming Bible

Old Dutch texts are extremely rare and much more limited than for related languages like Old English and Old High German. Most of the earliest texts written in the Netherlands were written in Latin, rather than Old Dutch. Some of the Latin texts, however, contained Old Dutch words interspersed with the Latin text. Also, it is hard to determine whether a text actually was written in Old Dutch, as the Germanic languages spoken at that time were not standardised and were much more similar to one another.

=== Oldest word (108) ===
Several words that are known to have developed in the Netherlands before Old Dutch was spoken have been found, and they are sometimes called Oudnederlands (English: "Old Netherlandic" or "Old Dutch") in a geographic sense. The oldest known example, wad 'mudflat', is already mentioned c. 107–108 AD in Tacitus' Histories (Book 5), in Latinised form as vadam (acc. sg.), as the name of a village, Vada, probably reflecting Early Germanic *wada. The word exclusively referred to the region and ground type that is now known as the Wadden Sea. However, since the word existed long before Old Dutch did (and even before its parent language, Frankish), it cannot be considered part of the vocabulary of Old Dutch but rather of Proto-Germanic.

=== Bergakker inscription (425–450) ===
Haþuþȳwas. Ann kusjam logūns.

The Elder Futhark runes from the 5th-century Bergakker inscription, found in Netherlands.

This sentence has been interpreted as "Haþuþyw's. I/He grant(s) a flame (i.e. brand, sword) to the select". It was discovered on a sword sheath mounting, excavated in 1996 in the Dutch village of Bergakker and is perhaps better described as Frankish than Old Dutch (Frankish was the direct parent language of Old Dutch). The text however, shows the beginning of Old Dutch morphology. The word ann, found in the partially-translated inscription is coined as the oldest Dutch by linguists Nicoline van der Sijs and Tanneke Schoonheim from Genootschap Onze Taal. They attribute that word to the ancestor of the modern Dutch verb root gun, through the addition of the prefix ge-. (An English cognate probably survives in to own (up) in the sense of 'to acknowledge, concede'.) Its modern meaning is roughly "to think someone deserves something, to derive satisfaction from someone else's success", and it is commonly translated as "grant" or "bestow".

=== Salic Law (6th century) ===
Maltho thi afrio lito

Glosses to the Salic law code (the Malberg glosses) contain several Old Dutch words and this full sentence written in the early 6th century, which is likely the earliest in the language. It translates as "I tell you: I am setting you free, serve". The phrase was used to free a serf. A lito (English: half-free) was a form of serf in the feudal system, a half-free farmer, who was connected to the land of the lord for whom he worked but not owned by that lord. In contrast, a slave was fully owned by the lord. The Old Dutch word and the Modern Dutch counterpart laat are both etymologically and in meaning undoubtedly related to the verb root laat (English: 'let go', 'release'), which may indicate the fairly free status of such person in relation to that a slave. The Old Dutch word lito is particularly recognisable in the verb's past tense lieten.

=== Utrecht Baptismal Vow (8th century) ===
End ec forsacho allum dioboles uuercum and uuordum, Thunær ende Uuôden ende Saxnôte ende allum thêm unholdum thê hira genôtas sint.

The Utrecht Baptismal Vow, or Old Saxon Baptismal Vow, is a 9th-century baptismal vow that was found in a monastery library in the German city of Mainz but was written in the Dutch city of Utrecht. The sentence translates as "And I renounce all the deeds and words of the devil, Thunear, Wōden and Saxnōt, and all those fiends that are their companions". It mentions three Germanic pagan gods of the early Saxons which the reader is to forsake: Uuôden ("Woden"), Thunaer and Saxnōt. Scholar Rudolf Simek comments that the vow is of particular interest because it is the sole instance of the god Saxnōt mentioned in a religious context. One of many baptismal vows, it is now archived in the Vatican Codex pal. 577. Sometimes interpreteted as Old Saxon, a number of Dutch scholars have concluded the Baptismal Vow was actually written in the 8th century in Old Dutch. The difficulty in establishing whether the text was written in Old Saxon or Old Franconian is that those languages were very much alike.

=== The Wachtendonck Psalms (10th century) ===
Irlôsin sol an frithe sêla mîna fan thên thia ginâcont mi, wanda under managon he was mit mi

The Wachtendonck Psalms are a collection of Latin psalms, with a translation in an eastern variety of Old Dutch (Old East Low Franconian) which contains a number of Old High German elements. The example sentence above translates as "He will deliver my soul in peace from those who attack me, for, amongst many, he was with me." Probably based on a Central Franconian original, very little remains of the psalms. They were named after a manuscript that has not survived but was the source from which scholars believe the surviving fragments must have been copied. The manuscript was once owned by Canon Arnold Wachtendonck. The surviving fragments are handwritten copies made by the Renaissance scholar Justus Lipsius in the sixteenth century. Lipsius made a number of separate copies of what appeared to be the same material, but the versions do not always agree. In addition, scholars conclude that the numerous errors and inconsistencies in the fragments point not only to some carelessness or inattentiveness by the Renaissance scholars but also to errors in the now-lost manuscript out of which the material was copied. The language of the Psalms suggests that they were originally written in the 10th century.

=== The Leiden Willeram (1100) ===
Thes naghtes an minemo beddo vortheroda ich minen wino. Ich vortheroda hine ande ne vand sin niet.

This example sentence taken from the Leiden Willeram translates as "All night long on my bed I looked for the one my heart loves; I looked for him but did not find him". The manuscript, now in the library of the Leiden University in the Netherlands, contains an Old Dutch translation of an Old High German (East Franconian) commentary on Song of Solomon, written by the German abbot Williram of Ebersberg. The translation was done by a monk of the Abbey of Egmond, and so the manuscript's other name is Egmond Willeram. The text represents an imperfect attempt to translate the original into the local Old Dutch vernacular. The text contains many Old Dutch words as well as mistranslated words since the scribe must have been unfamiliar with some Old High German words in the original. It could nevertheless be regarded as the first book written in Old Dutch. However, since the book never left the abbey, it cannot be regarded as the start of a Dutch literature and did not influence later works.

=== Hebban olla vogala (1100) ===
Hebban olla vogala nestas hagunnan hinase hic enda thu, uuat unbidan uue nu.

Arguably the most famous text containing Old Dutch, the fragment is translated as "All birds have started making nests, except me and you, what are we waiting for?" The text is dated from around 1100 and written by a West Flemish monk in a convent in Rochester, England. For a long time, the sentence was commonly but erroneously considered to be the earliest in Dutch. However, it could be considered the oldest Dutch non-religious poetry. The text is usually considered a West Flemish dialect, but certain Ingvaeonic forms might be expected in any of the coastal dialects of Old English, Old Frisian, Old Saxon or Old Dutch. However, the -n of the third-person plural hebban, which is absent in both Old English and Frisian, identifies the language as Old Dutch (Old High German habent uses a different stem). Hagunnan and hi(c) have a prothetic h, which points also to West Flemish in which the h was frequently dropped or, in the written language, added before vowels (compare abent in the Latin version). However, it has been postulated that the text could equally well be Old English, more specifically Old Kentish.

=== The Rhinelandic Rhyming Bible (12th century) ===
nu saget mir einen kuning other greven, the an uren got wille gelouven, that se sagent, that ist gelogen, thes ist thaz arme volc bedrogen.

Translated as "Mention one king or earl who wants to believe in their god, what they say is a lie, that's how the people are being deceived", this fragment comes from an important source for Old Dutch: the Rhinelandic Rhyming Bible (Dutch: Rijnlandse Rijmbijbel; German: Rheinische Reimbibel). The verse translation of biblical histories is attested only in a series of fragments from different writers. It contains Old Dutch (Low Franconian), Low German (Low Saxon) and High German (Rhine-Franconian) elements. It was likely composed in the northwest of Germany in the early 12th century, possibly in Werden Abbey, near Essen.

== Phonology ==
=== Early sound developments ===
Phonologically, Old Dutch stands in between Old Saxon and Old High German, sharing some innovations with the latter, and others with the former.

Characteristics shared with Old Saxon

- The Old Germanic diphthongs ai and au become the long vowels ē and ō in unstressed syllables. Examples: hēm, slōt. There are, however, several examples that show that a diphthong ei remained in some cases.
- Loss of Proto-Germanic z word-finally in single-syllable words, e.g. thi vs Old High German thir/dir < PG *þiz (dative of the second-person singular pronoun).

Characteristics shared with Old High German

- The West Germanic ō (/oː/) and ē (/eː/, from Proto-Germanic ē^{2}) become diphthongs uo and ie in stressed syllables. Old Dutch fluot versus Old Saxon flōd, Old Dutch hier versus Old Saxon hēr.
- The h-sound in consonant clusters at the beginning of a word disappears around the 9th century while it is retained in the northern languages. Examples include Old Dutch ringis ("ring", genitive), Old High German ring versus Old Saxon and Old English hring, or ros ("steed") versus Old English hros ("horse").
- j is lost when following two consonants, with -jan becoming -en. It is most prominent in ja- and jō-stem nouns and adjectives, and in verbs of the first weak class.

Characteristics not shared with either Old Saxon or Old High German

- Final obstruent devoicing. This later spread to the other Germanic dialects (as well as several Romance languages such as Old French and Old Occitan).
- h disappears between vowels (shared with the Anglo-Frisian languages). Old Dutch thion, Old English þēon versus Old High German dîhan, or Old Dutch (ge)sian, Old English sēon versus Old Saxon and Old High German sehan. (The h in modern German sehen /ˈzeː.ən/ became mute only in later stages of German.)
- The sound combination hs (/xs/) becomes a geminated ss. Example: Old Dutch vusso versus Old Saxon fohs, Old High German fuhs. (A development shared by the Middle Franconian dialects of High German: compare Luxembourgish Fuuss. The Anglo-Frisian languages instead shift hs to ks: compare Old English fox, Old Frisian foks.)

=== Consonants ===
The table below lists the consonantal phonemes of Old Dutch. For descriptions of the sounds and definitions of the terms, follow the links on the headings.

Old Dutch consonant phonemes
| | | Labial | Dental | Alveolar | Palatal | Velar | Glottal |
|---|---|---|---|---|---|---|---|
| Nasal | | m | n | | | | |
| Plosive | voiceless | p | t | | | k | |
| Plosive | voiced | b | d | | | | |
| Fricative | voiceless | f | θ | s | | x | h |
| Fricative | voiced | v | | | | ɣ | |
| Approximant | | | l | | j | w | |
| Trill | | | r | | | | |

Notes:

- /m, p, b/ were bilabial whereas /f, v/ were labiodental.
- /n, t, d, l/ could have been either dental [n̪, t̪, d̪, l̪] or alveolar [n͇, t͇, d͇, l͇]. From the presence of /θ/ in the language it can be inferred that the sibilant /s/ was alveolar and possibly retracted (if so, the realization of the /s-θ/ contrast could have been the same as in modern Icelandic or European Spanish)
  - /n/ had a velar allophone [ŋ] when it occurred before the velars /k, ɣ/.
  - /l/ had a velarised allophone [ɫ] between a back vowel and /t/ or /d/. It might have also been used in other environments, as it is the case in Modern Dutch.
- /θ/ was likely dental [θ̪], but it could have also been alveolar [θ͇], as it is the case in Modern Icelandic.
- /r/ was alveolar, either a trill [r͇] or a tap [ɾ͇].
- Most consonants could be geminated. Notably, geminated /v/ gave [bb], and geminated /ɣ/ probably gave [ɡɡ]. Geminated /h/ resulted in [xx].
- In the course of the Old Dutch period the voiceless spirants /f, θ, s/ gained voiced allophones [v, ð, z] when positioned at the beginning of a syllable. The change is faithfully reflected for [v], the other two allophones continuing to be written as before. In the Wachtendonck Psalms, it is very rare, but much later, it can be seen in the spelling of Dutch toponyms. Thus, the sound change was taking place during the 10th and 11th century. In the same period, /h/ too was voiced to [ɦ] by analogy with the other fricatives.
- /v/ also occurred word-medially as an independent phoneme, developed from Proto-Germanic [β], the fricative allophone of /b/. Thus, at least initially, the approximant /w/ was likely labio-velar as in English, rather than simply bilabial, as in contemporary Southern Dutch (a labiodental pronunciation developed later in the North).
- After /n/, /ɣ/ was realized as a plosive [ɡ].
- Postvocalic /h/ was realized as velar [x].

==== Final-obstruent devoicing ====
Final-obstruent devoicing of Proto-Germanic [β] to [f] occurred across the West Germanic languages, and thus also in Old Dutch. Old Dutch spelling also reveals final devoicing of other consonants, namely:

- [d] > [t]: wort ("word", nominative) versus wordes (genitive)
- [ɣ] > [x]: weh [wex] ("way", accusative) versus wege ("way", dative)

Final devoicing was countered by the syllable-initial voicing of voiceless fricatives, which made [v] and [f] allophones of each other.

Final devoicing appears much earlier in Old Dutch than it does Old Saxon and Old High German. In fact, by judging from the find at Bergakker, it would seem that the language already had inherited this characteristic from Old Frankish whereas Old Saxon and Old High German are known to have maintained word-final voiced obstruents much later (at least 900).

=== Vowels ===
Old Dutch monophthongs
| | Front | | | Back | |
| | unrounded | | rounded | rounded | |
| | short | long | short | short | long |
|---|---|---|---|---|---|
| Close | i | iː | y | u | uː |
| Mid | e | eː | ø | o | oː |
| Open | | | | ɑ | ɑː |

Notes:

- Phonetic realisation of /uː/ differed by area. In most areas, it was probably realised phonetically as central [ʉː] or front [yː] or a diphthong [ʉ̞w ~ ʏw] before a vowel, but it was probably retained as back [uː] or [ʊw] in others (at least in Limburg). While there is no direct evidence for this in Old Dutch, it can be inferred from later developments in Middle Dutch.
- Long vowels were rare in unstressed syllables and occurred mostly because of suffixation or compounding.
- /y/ and /ø/ were originally umlaut allophones of /u/ and /o/ before /i/ or /j/ in the following syllable. They were, however, partly phonemicised when the conditioning sounds were gradually lost over time. Sometimes, the fronting was reverted later. Regardless of phonemic distinction, they were still written as u and o.
- As in northwestern High German, /u/ was lowered to [o] by the end of the Old Dutch period and is no longer distinguished from /o/ (likely [ɔ]) in writing. In western dialects, the two phonemes eventually merge.
- /i/ and /e/ were also similar in articulation, but they did not merge except in some small and frequently used monosyllables (such as bin > ben, 'I am'). They, however, merged consistently when they were later lengthened in open syllables.
- The backness of /ɑ/ and /ɑː/ is unknown, but they were likely fully open (unlike some /ɑ/ variants found in contemporary Randstad Dutch) and not rounded (unlike /ɑː/ in contemporary Limburgish). As the vowels pattern as back in phonology, a back [ɑ, ɑː] or central [ä, äː] pronunciation is likely, with no way of telling if the short variant differed in quality from the long one. Regional variation (as in modern Dutch) cannot be ruled out.
  - /ɑ/ probably had a rounded allophone [ɒ] in one context, i.e. before velarised [ɫ]. It eventually merged with /o/ in this position, as in Low Saxon, but in Dutch, the velar [ɫ] vocalised, creating a diphthong [ɔu] (lowered to [ɑu] in Northern and certain Southern dialects).

In unstressed syllables, only three vowels seem to have been reliably distinguished: open, front and back. In the Wachtendonck Psalms, the e and i merged in unstressed syllables, as did o and u. That led to variants like dagi and dage ("day", dative singular) and tungon and tungun ("tongue", genitive, dative, accusative singular and nominative, dative, accusative plural). The forms with e and o are generally found later on, showing the gradual reduction of the articulatory distinction, eventually merging into a schwa (/ə/). A short phrase from the gospel book of Munsterbilzen Abbey, written around 1130, still shows several unstressed vowels distinguished:

Tesi samanunga was edele unde scona
This community was noble and pure

That was a late monument, however, as the merging of all unstressed short vowels was already well underway by that time. Most likely, the difference was maintained only in spelling traditions, but it had been mostly lost in speech. With the introduction of new scribal traditions in the 12th and 13th century, the practices were abandoned, and unstressed vowels were consistently written as e from that time onward.

Old Dutch diphthongs
| | Front | Back |
|---|---|---|
| Opening | io (ia ie) | uo |
| Height-harmonic | iu | |
| Closing | ei | (ou) |

Notes:

- The /eː/ (*ē²) and /oː/ are diphthongized into /ie/ and /uo/, respectively.
- The closing diphthongs /ei/ and /ou/ occurred systematically only in the southeastern dialects, having merged with /eː/ and /oː/ elsewhere. The other dialects retained only /ei/, in words where earlier /ai/ had been affected by umlaut (which prevented it from becoming /eː/ in many Old Dutch dialects, but not in Old Saxon).
- The situation for the front opening diphthongs is somewhat unclear, but it seems similar to the situation for unstressed short vowels. Words written with io in Old High German are often found written with ia or even ie in Old Dutch. They had likely merged with each other already during the Old Dutch period.
- Similarly /iu/ eventually merged with the other opening diphthongs in some dialects. In the others, it merged with /uː/ in most cases (after having passed through an intermediate stage such as [yu]).
- There also existed 'long' diphthongs /aːu/ and /eːu/, but these were treated as two-syllable sequences of a long vowel followed by a short one, not as proper diphthongs.

== Orthography ==
Old Dutch was spelt using the Latin alphabet.

The length of a vowel was generally not represented in writing probably because the missionaries, who were the ones capable of writing and teaching how to write, tended to base the written language on Latin, which also did not make a distinction in writing: dag "day" (short vowel), thahton "they thought" (long vowel). Later on, the long vowels were sometimes marked with a macron to indicate a long vowel: ā. In some texts long vowels were indicated by simply doubling the vowel in question, as in the placename Heembeke and personal name Oodhelmus (both from charters written in 941 and 797 respectively).

- c is used for [k] when it is followed by u, o or a: cuning [kuniŋk] 'king' (modern koning). In front of i or e, the earlier texts (especially names in Latin deeds and charters) used ch. By the later tenth century, the newer letter k (which was rarely used in Latin) was starting to replace this spelling: kēron [keːron] 'to turn around' (mod. keren).
- It is not exactly clear how c was pronounced before i or e in Old Dutch. In the Latin orthography of the time, c before front vowels stood for an affricate [t͡s]; it is quite likely that early Dutch spelling followed that pronunciation.
- g represented [ɣ] or its allophone [ɡ]: brengan [breŋɡan] 'to bring', seggan [seɡɡan] 'to say', wege [weɣe] 'way' (dative).
- h represents [h] and its allophone [x]: holto [hoɫto] 'wood' (mod. hout), naht [naxt] 'night' (mod. nacht).
- i is used for both the vowels [i] and [iː] and the consonant [j]: ik [ik] 'I' (mod. ik), iār [jaːr] 'year' (mod. jaar).
- qu always represents [kw]: quāmon [kwaːmon] 'they came' (mod. kwamen).
- s represented the consonant [s] and later also [z].
- th is used to indicate [θ]: thāhton [θaːxton] 'they thought' (mod. dachten). Occasionally, dh is used for [ð].
- u represented the vowels [u] and [uː] or the consonant [v]: uusso [vusːo] 'foxes' (genitive plural).
- uu was normally used to represent [w]. It evolved into the separate letter w during the later Middle Ages. See W#History.
- z rarely appears, and when it does, it is pronounced [ts]: quezzodos [kwetsodos] 'you hurt' (past tense, now kwetste).

== Grammar ==
=== Nouns ===
Old Dutch may have preserved at least four of the six cases of Proto-Germanic: nominative, accusative, genitive and dative. A fifth case, the instrumental, could have also existed.

=== The a declension ===
The -s ending in the masculine plural was preserved in the coastal dialects, as can be seen in the Hebban Olla Vogala text where nestas is used instead of nesta. Later on, the -s ending entered Hollandic dialects and became part of the modern standard language.

| | Masculine: dag (day) | | | | Neuter: buok (book) | | | |
| | Singular | | Plural | | Singular | | Plural | |
|---|---|---|---|---|---|---|---|---|
| Nominative, Accusative | dag | – | daga(s) | -a(s) | buok | – | buok | – |
| Genitive | dages / dagis | -es / -is | dago | -o | buokes / buokis | -es / -is | buoko | -o |
| Dative | dage / dagi | -e / -i | dagon | -on | buoke / buoki | -e / -i | buokon | -on |

=== The o declension & weak feminine declension ===
During the Old Dutch period, the distinction between the feminine ō-stems and ōn-stems began to disappear, when endings of one were transferred to the other declension and vice versa, as part of a larger process in which the distinction between the strong and weak inflection was being lost not only in feminine nouns but also in adjectives. The process is shown in a more advanced stage in Middle Dutch.

| | Feminine: ertha (earth) | | | |
| | Singular | | Plural | |
|---|---|---|---|---|
| Nominative, Accusative | ertha | -a | ertha / erthon | -a / -on |
| Genitive | erthon | -on | erthono | -ono |
| Dative | ertho | -o | erthon | -on |

=== The i declension ===
| | Masculine: bruk (breach) | | | | Feminine: gift (gift) | | | |
| | Singular | | Plural | | Singular | | Plural | |
|---|---|---|---|---|---|---|---|---|
| Nominative, Accusative | bruk | – | bruke / bruki | -e / -i | gift | – | gifte / gifti | -e / -i |
| Genitive | brukes / brukis | -es / -is | bruko | -o | gifte / gifti | -e / -i | gifto | -o |
| Dative | bruke / bruki | -e / -i | brukin | -in | gifte / gifti | -e / -i | giftin | -in |

=== The weak masculine and neuter declensions ===
| | Masculine: balko (beam) | | | | Neuter: herta (heart) | | | |
| | Singular | | Plural | | Singular | | Plural | |
|---|---|---|---|---|---|---|---|---|
| Nominative | balko | -o | balkon | -on | herta | -a | herton | -on |
| Accusative | balkon | -on | balkon | -on | herta | -a | herton | -on |
| Genitive | balkin | -in | balkono | -ono | hertin | -in | hertono | -ono |
| Dative | balkin | -in | balkon | -on | hertin | -in | herton | -on |

=== Verbs ===
Old Dutch reflects an intermediate form between Old Saxon and Old High German. Like Old High German, it preserved the three different verb endings in the plural (-on, -et and -unt) while the more northern languages have the same verb ending in all three persons. However, like Old Saxon, it had only two classes of weak verb, with only a few relic verbs of the third weak class, but the third class had still largely been preserved in Old High German.

== See also ==
- Middle Dutch
- Dutch
- Low Franconian languages

== Bibliography ==
- Quak, A.; Van der Horst, J. M. (2002). Inleiding Oudnederlands (in Dutch). Leuven: Leuven University Press.
- Gysseling, Maurits; Pijnenburg, Willy (1980). Corpus van Middelnederlandse teksten (tot en met het jaar 1300): Reeks II (literaire handschriften) (in Dutch). Vol. 1. The Hague: Martinus Nijhoff.
- Gysseling, M. (1970). "Prae-Nederlands, Oudnederlands, Vroegmiddelnederlands". Vierde Colloquium van hoogleraren en lectoren in de neerlandistiek aan buitenlandse universiteiten (in Dutch). Ghent. pp. 78–89.
- Van den Toorn, M. C.; Pijnenburg, W. J. J.; Van Leuvensteijn, J. A.; et al. (1997). Geschiedenis van de Nederlandse taal (in Dutch). Amsterdam: Amsterdam University Press.
- Sanders, Willy (1974). Der Leidener Willeram. Untersuchungen zu Handschrift, Text und Sprachform (in German). Munich: Wilhelm Fink.
