= Heliand =

9th-century Old Saxon poem

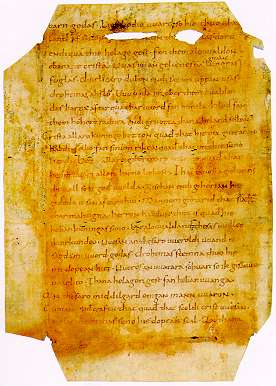
Heliand excerpt from the German Historical Museum

The Heliand (/ˈhɛliənd/) is an epic alliterative verse poem in Old Saxon, written in the first half of the 9th century. The title means "savior" in Old Saxon (cf. German and Dutch Heiland meaning "savior"), and the poem is a Biblical paraphrase that recounts the life of Jesus in the alliterative verse style of a Germanic epic. Heliand is the largest known work of written Old Saxon.

The poem would have been moderately popular since it has survived in only two manuscripts (Cotton MS. & Munich MS.) plus some further fragmentary versions in four other manuscripts. It takes up about 6,000 lines. A praefatio exists, which could have been commissioned by either Louis the Pious (king from 814 to 840) or Louis the German (806–876). This praefatio was first printed by Matthias Flacius in 1562, and while it has no authority in the manuscripts it is generally deemed to be authentic. The first mention of the poem itself in modern times occurred when Franciscus Junius (the younger) transcribed a fragment in 1587. It was not printed until 1705, by the English clergyman George Hickes. The first modern edition of the poem was published in 1830 by Johann Andreas Schmeller.

== Historical context ==
The Heliand was probably written at the request of emperor Louis the Pious around AD 830 to combat Saxon ambivalence toward Christianity. The Saxons were forced to convert to Christianity in the late 8th to early 9th century after 33 years of conflict between the Saxons under Widukind and the Franks under Charlemagne. Around the time that the Heliand was written, there was a revolt of the Saxon stelinga, or lower social castes. Murphy depicts the significant influence the Heliand had over the fate of European society; he writes that the author of the Heliand "created a unique cultural synthesis between Christianity and Germanic warrior society – a synthesis that would plant the seed that would one day blossom in the full-blown culture of knighthood and become the foundation of medieval Europe."

== Manuscripts ==
The 9th-century poem on the Gospel history, to which its first editor, J. A. Schmeller, gave the name of Heliand (the word used in the text for Savior, answering to the Old English hǣlend and the modern German and Dutch Heiland), is, with the fragments of a poem based on the Book of Genesis, all that remains of the poetical literature of the old Saxons, i.e. the Saxons who continued in their original home. It contained when entire about 6000 lines, and portions of it are preserved in two nearly complete manuscripts and four fragments. The Cotton MS. in the British Library, written probably in the second half of the 10th century, is one of the nearly complete manuscripts, ending in the middle of the story of the journey to Emmaus. It is believed to have an organization closer to the original version because it is divided into fitts, or songs. The Munich MS., formerly at Bamberg, begins at line 85, and has many lacunae, but continues the history down to the last verse of St. Luke's Gospel, ending, however, in the middle of a sentence with the last two fitts missing. This manuscript is now retained in Munich at the Bavarian State Library. Because it was produced on calf skin of high quality, it has been preserved in good condition. Neumes above the text in this version reveal that the Heliand may have been sung. A fragment discovered at Prague in 1881 contains lines 958–1006, and another, in the Vatican Library, discovered by K. Zangemeister in 1894, contains lines 1279–1358. Two additional fragments exist that were discovered most recently. The first was discovered in 1979 at a Jesuit High School in Straubing by B. Bischoff and is currently held in Bayerische Staatsbibliothek. It consists of nearly three leaves and contains 157 poetic lines. The final fragment was found in Leipzig in 2006 by T. Doring and H. U. Schmid. This fragment consists of only one leaf that contains 47 lines of poetry, and it is currently kept at Bibliotheca Albertina.

== Authorship and relation to Old Saxon Genesis ==
The poem is based not directly on the New Testament, but on the pseudo-Tatian's Gospel harmony, and it demonstrates the author's acquaintance with the commentaries of Alcuin, Bede, and Rabanus Maurus.

Early scholarship, notably that of Braune, hypothesized that the Heliand was authored by the same hand as the Old Saxon Genesis, but scholarly consensus has shifted away from this view; Sievers had already abandoned the hypothesis when Braune published his study. Large parts of that poem are extant only in an Old English translation, known as Genesis B. The portions that have been preserved in the original language are contained in the same Vatican manuscript that includes the fragment of the Heliand referred to above. In the one language or the other, there are in existence the following three fragments: (I) The passage which appears as lines 235–851 of the Old English verse Genesis in the Caedmon Manuscript (MS Junius 11) (this fragment is known as Genesis B, distinguishing it from the rest of the poem, Genesis A), about the revolt of the angels and the temptation and fall of Adam and Eve. Of this a short part corresponding to lines 790–820 exists also in the original Old Saxon. (2) The story of Cain and Abel, in 124 lines. (3) The account of the destruction of Sodom, in 187 lines. The main source of the Genesis is the Bible, but Eduard Sievers showed that considerable use was made of two Latin poems by Alcimus Avitus, De initio mundi and De peccato originali.

Such external evidence as exists bearing on the origin of the Heliand and the companion poem is contained in a Latin document printed by Flacius Illyricus in 1562. This is in two parts; the one in prose, entitled (perhaps only by Flacius himself) Praefatio ad librum antiquum in lingua Saxonica conscriptum; the other in verse, headed Versus de poeta et Interpreta hujus codicis. The Praefatio begins by stating that the emperor Ludwig the Pious, desirous that his subjects should possess the word of God in their own tongue, commanded a certain Saxon, who was esteemed among his countrymen as an eminent poet, to translate poetically into the German language the Old and New Testaments. The poet willingly obeyed, all the more because he had previously received a divine command to undertake the task. He rendered into verse all the most important parts of the Bible, dividing his work into vitteas, a term which, the writer says, may be rendered by lectiones or sententias. The Praefatio goes on to say that it was reported that the poet, till then knowing nothing of the art of poetry, had been admonished in a dream to turn into verse the precepts of the divine law, which he did with so much skill that his work surpasses in beauty all other German poetry (Ut cuncta Theudisca poemata suo vincat decore). The Versus practically reproduce in outline Bede's account of Caedmon's dream, without mentioning the dream, but describing the poet as a herdsman, and adding that his poems, beginning with the creation, relate the history of the five ages of the world down to the coming of Christ.

== Controversies ==
=== Authorship ===
The suspicion of some earlier scholars that the Praefatio and the Versus might be a modern forgery is refuted by the occurrence of the word vitteas, which is the Old Saxon fihtea, corresponding to the Old English fitt, which means a canto of a poem. It is impossible that a scholar of the 16th century could have been acquainted with this word, and internal evidence shows clearly that both the prose and the verse are of early origin. The Versus, considered in themselves, might very well be supposed to relate to Caedmon; but the mention of the five ages of the world in the concluding lines is obviously due to recollection of the opening of the Heliand (lines 46–47). It is therefore certain that the Versus, as well as the Praefatio, attribute to the author of the Heliand a poetic rendering of the Old Testament. Their testimony, if accepted, confirms the ascription to him of the Genesis fragments, which is further supported by the fact that they occur in the same MS. with a portion of the Heliand. As the Praefatio speaks of the emperor Ludwig in the present tense, the former part of it at least was probably written in his reign, i.e. not later than AD 840. The general opinion of scholars is that the latter part, which represents the poet as having received his vocation in a dream, is by a later hand, and that the sentences in the earlier part which refer to the dream are interpolations by this second author. The date of these additions, and of the Versus, is of no importance, as their statements are not credible.

That the author of the Heliand was, so to speak, another Caedmon – an unlearned man who turned into poetry what was read to him from the sacred writings – is impossible according to some scholars, because in many passages the text of the sources is so closely followed that it is clear that the poet wrote with the Latin books before him. Other historians, however, argue that the possibility that the author may have been illiterate should not be dismissed because the translations seem free compared to line-by-line translations that were made from Tatian's Diatessaron in the second quarter of the 9th century into Old High German. Additionally, the poem also shares much of its structure with Old English, Old Norse, and Old High German alliterative poetry which all included forms of heroic poetry that were available only orally and passed from singer to singer. Repetitions of particular words and phrases as well as irregular beginnings of fits (sentences begin at the middle of a line rather than at the beginning of a line to help with alliteration) that occur in the Heliand seem awkward as written text but make sense when considering the Heliand formerly as a song for after-dinner singing in the mead hall or monastery. There is no reason for rejecting the almost contemporary testimony of the first part of the Free folio that the author of the Heliand had won renown as a poet before he undertook his great task at the emperor's command. It is certainly not impossible that a Christian Saxon, sufficiently educated to read Latin easily, may have chosen to follow the calling of a scop or minstrel instead of entering the priesthood or the cloister; and if such a person existed, it would be natural that he should be selected by the emperor to execute his design. As has been said above, the tone of many portions of the Heliand is that of a man who was no mere imitator of the ancient epic, but who had himself been accustomed to sing of heroic themes.

=== German Christianity ===
Scholars disagree over whether the overall tone of the Heliand lends to the text being an example of a Germanized Christianity or a Christianized Germany. Some historians believe that the German traditions of fighting and enmity are so well pronounced as well as an underlying message of how it is better to be meek than mighty that the text lends more to a Germanized Christianity. Other scholars argue that the message of meekness is so blatant that it renders the text as a stronger representation of a Christianized Germany. This discussion is important because it reveals what culture was more pervasive to the other.

=== Use by Luther ===
Many historians agree that Martin Luther possessed a copy of the Heliand. Luther referenced the Heliand as an example to encourage translation of Gospels into the vernacular. Additionally, Luther also favored wording presented in the Heliand to other versions of the Gospels. For example, many scholars believe that Luther favored the angel's greeting to Mary in the Heliand – "you are dear to your Lord" – because he disliked the notion of referring to a human as "full of grace."

=== Extra-canonical origins ===
Contention exists over whether the Heliand is connected to the Gospel of Thomas. The Gospel of Thomas is a Judaic/Christian version of the Gospels found in 1956 that has been attributed the apostle Thomas. Quispel, a Dutch scholar, argues that the Heliand's author used a primitive Diatessaron, the Gospel harmony written in 160-175 by Tatian and thus has connections to the Gospel of Thomas by this association. Other scholars, such as Krogmann assert that the Heliand shares a poetic style of the Diatessaron but that the author may not actually have relied on this source and therefore the Heliand would have no association to the Gospel of Thomas.

== Sample passages ==
tho sagda he that her scoldi cumin en wiscuning
mari endi mahtig an thesan middelgard
bezton giburdies; quad that it scoldi wesan barn godes,
quad that he thesero weroldes waldan scoldi
gio te ewandaga, erdun endi himiles.
He quad that an them selbon daga, the ina salingna
an thesan middilgard modar gidrogi
so quad he that ostana en scoldi skinan
huit, sulic so wi her ne habdin er
undartuisc erda endi himil odar huerigin
ne sulic barn ne sulic bocan. (VII, 582-92)

Translation:

Then he spoke and said there would come a wise king,
magnificent and mighty, to this middle realm;
he would be of the best birth; he said that he would be the Son of God,
he said that he would rule this world,
earth and sky, always and forevermore.
he said that on the same day on which the mother gave birth to the Blessed One
in this middle realm, in the East,
he said, there would shine forth a brilliant light in the sky,
one such as we never had before
between heaven and earth nor anywhere else,
never such a baby and never such a beacon.

== Editions and translations ==
=== Editions ===
The first complete edition of the Heliand was published by J. A. Schmeller in 1830; the second volume, containing the glossary and grammar, appeared in 1840. The standard edition is that of Eduard Sievers (1877), in which the texts of the Cotton and Munich manuscripts are printed side by side. It is not provided with a glossary, but contains an elaborate and most valuable analysis of the diction, synonymy and syntactical features of the poem.

Other useful editions are those of Moritz Heyne (3rd ed., 1903), Otto Behaghel (1882) and Paul Piper (1897, containing also the Genesis fragments). The fragments of the Heliand and the Genesis contained in the Vatican MS. were edited in 1894 by Karl Zangemeister and Wilhelm Braune under the title Bruchstücke der altsächsischen Bibeldichtung.

James E. Cathey wrote Heliand: Text and Commentary (2002) (Morgantown: West Virginia University Press, ISBN 0-937058-64-5), which includes an edited version of the text in the original language, commentaries in English and a very useful grammar of Old Saxon along with an appended glossary defining all of the vocabulary found in this version.

=== Translations ===
- The Heliand: Translated from the Old Saxon, trans. by Mariana Scott, UNC Studies in the Germanic Languages and Literatures, 52 (Chapel Hill: University of North Carolina Press, 1966), doi:10.5149/9781469658346_Scott
  - Comparative digitization (Saxon alongside English)
  - Heliand in HTML
- The Heliand: The Saxon Gospel, trans. by G. Ronald Murphy (New York: Oxford University Press, 1992)
- An Annotated English Translation of the Old Saxon Heliand: A Ninth-century Biblical Paraphrase in the Germanic Epic Style, trans. by Tonya Kim Dewey (Edwin Mellen Press, 2010), ISBN 0773414827
- In 2012, four translations of the Heliand were published (Uitgeverij TwentseWelle, now Uitgeverij Twentse Media) in four modern Saxon dialects: Tweants (tr. Anne van der Meiden and Dr. Harry Morshuis), Achterhoeks (Henk Krosenbrink and Henk Lettink), Gronings (Sies Woltjer) and Münsterlands (Hannes Demming), along with a critical edition of the Old Saxon text by Timothy Sodmann. In 2022 two translations were added, one in Stellingwerfs and one in Sallands.

== Studies ==
Luther's Heliand: Resurrection of the Old Saxon Epic in Leipzig (2011) by Timothy Blaine Price is a self-published book detailing results of the author's personal research and travels. Perspectives on the Old Saxon Heliand (2010) edited by Valentine A. Pakis contains critical essays and commentaries. G. Ronald Murphy published The Saxon Saviour: The Germanic Transformation of the Gospel in the Ninth-Century Heliand (1989) (New York: Oxford University Press).

== See also ==
- Germanic languages: A language family, the languages of which are spoken in northern and northwestern Europe, and in many places colonized since around 1500
- Germanic peoples: Collective name of a number of tribes and peoples, originating from northern Europe, several of which invaded the Roman Empire in the 5th and 6th centuries
- their Germanic mythology
- Germanic Christianity that came to dominate much of North-Western Europe in the second millennium, i.e. the Germans (in a wide sense), Anglo-Saxons and the Scandinavians
- Beowulf: A prominent epic poem that may have been written around the same time, in the closely related Old English language.
- Muspilli: A similar Biblical poem of debated meaning, written in Old High German.
