= Old Saxon Genesis =

Genesis is an Old Saxon Biblical poem recounting the story of the Book of Genesis, dating to the first half of the 9th century, three fragments of which are preserved in a manuscript in the Vatican Library, Palatinus Latinus 1447. It and the Heliand, a heroic poem based on the New Testament, a fragment of which is also included in the same manuscript, constitute the only major records of Old Saxon poetry. It is also the basis of the Anglo-Saxon poem known as Genesis B, and Eduard Sievers postulated its existence on linguistic evidence before the manuscript was discovered.

== Manuscript, dating and provenance ==
Palatinus Latinus 1447 is a computus and is assembled from several components, the earliest of which have been dated to around 813 and are shown by internal evidence to have been originally produced at the St. Alban's Abbey in Mainz. The Old Saxon material must have been written down later than an astronomical calculation dated to after 836, and the Genesis fragments are in three different hands which have been assigned on palaeographic evidence to the third quarter of the 9th century.

Both Genesis and Heliand appear to be in an artificial literary language, and hence can be placed in the context of a relatively brief period between about 819 and approximately the death of Louis the Pious in 840, when the native Saxon poetic tradition had waned and the Carolingians sought to interest the recently and forcibly converted Saxons in Christian stories. Genesis must be the later of the two, because it alludes to Heliand. Its composition has been located by some scholars at the Abbey of Fulda, a Frankish centre on the edge of Saxon territory, and by others at the Abbey of Werden, in the centre of the Saxon area.

== Hypothetical reconstruction and discovery ==
In 1875, preparatory to publishing an edition of the Heliand, Eduard Sievers argued in a monograph on it and the Anglo-Saxon Genesis that lines 235–851 of the Anglo-Saxon work were originally a separate poem, which he named 'Genesis B' to distinguish it from the remainder, Genesis A, and that this was an Anglo-Saxonised version of a lost Old Saxon poem corresponding to the Genesis poem referred to in the Latin preface to the Heliand. His inference, made on metrical and linguistic grounds, was confirmed in 1894 when Karl Zangemeister, the professor of Classics at the University of Leipzig, found and identified the fragments on a visit to the Vatican Library. Photographs were made and the first edition of the Old Saxon poem, by Zangemeister with Wilhelm Braune and with an introduction by Rudolf Kögel, was completed by the end of the year. Sievers did revise his original hypothesis that the same poet was responsible for both Heliand and Genesis.

== Text, Anglo-Saxon poem and possible sources ==
The manuscript preserves three fragments:

- 1–26: a speech by Adam from after the Fall
- 27–150: a segment concerning Abraham and Sodom
- 151–337: a segment concerning Cain and Abel.

These correspond respectively to lines 790–817a, 151–337, and 27–150 of the Anglo-Saxon Genesis B.

Stylistically, Genesis even more than the Heliand shows that it is the product of a written tradition: although it retains features of Germanic oral heroic poetry such as alliteration and formulaic diction, it is discursive and uses long, connected clauses, and the language shows signs of developing towards the use of particles rather than case endings. Anglo-Saxon poetry had a longer written history beginning with the retaining of oral poetry, and the Anglo-Saxon translator of Genesis B has tightened up the loose connections by using more subordinate clauses. The metre is also less varied than in the Heliand. In some places, Genesis B has been further revised in the manuscript to make it more Anglo-Saxon in syntax, word forms, and (late West Saxon) spelling. Metrically and grammatically, the Anglo-Saxon poem shows few signs of being a translation.

The poem diverges from the story of the Fall as told in the Vulgate. Adam is tempted by a demon in the guise of an angel, not by a "serpent" as in the Bible, and Eve plays a much more active role: Adam is tempted first and refuses, and the tempter tells her to persuade him by telling him the forbidden fruit bestows divine powers; she instead proves it to him by recounting a blissful heavenly vision. Although it has been suggested that the vision derives from a Germanic source—the relationship of the lord to his war-band or comitatus—the likeliest source appears to be Jewish apocryphal texts and the writings of Pope Gregory the Great or other contemporary biblical interpreters, including the Heliand. It also reflects the theological crisis in the Carolingian Empire in the mid-9th century over free will and predestination, focussing on Gottschalk of Orbais. However, the poem also reflects Germanic concepts in the role of Eve as advisor to her husband, in the feud element of the Fall, and in the mention in Genesis B, presumably present in the Old Saxon original and also present in the Heliand, of Satan employing a hæleðhelm or helm of disguise.

== Editions ==
- Karl Friedrich Wilhelm Zangemeister and Wilhelm Braune. Bruchstücke der altsächsischen Bibeldichtung, aus der Bibliotheca palatina. Neue Heidelberger Jahrbücher 4 (1894) 205–94 (with facsimile). Heidelberg: Koester, 1894. OCLC 10626142 (without facsimile) (in German)
- Otto Behaghel. Heliand und Genesis. Altdeutsche Textbibliothek 4. 1903. 9th ed. rev. Burkhard Taeger. Tübingen: Niemeyer, 1984. ISBN 9783484200036 (with Heliand) (in German)
- Alger N. Doane. The Saxon Genesis: An Edition of the West Saxon 'Genesis B' and the Old Saxon Vatican 'Genesis'. Madison, Wisconsin / London: University of Wisconsin, 1991. ISBN 9780299128005 (with Genesis B)
- Ute Schwab with Ludwig Schuba and Hartmut Kugler. Die Bruchstücke der altsächsischen Genesis und ihrer altenglischen Übertragung: Einführung, Textwiedergaben und Übersetzungen, Abbildung der gesamten Überlieferung. Litterae 29. Göppingen: Kümmerle, 1991. ISBN 9783874522168 (with Genesis B and facsimile) (in German)
