= Genesis A =

Old English poem paraphrasing Genesis

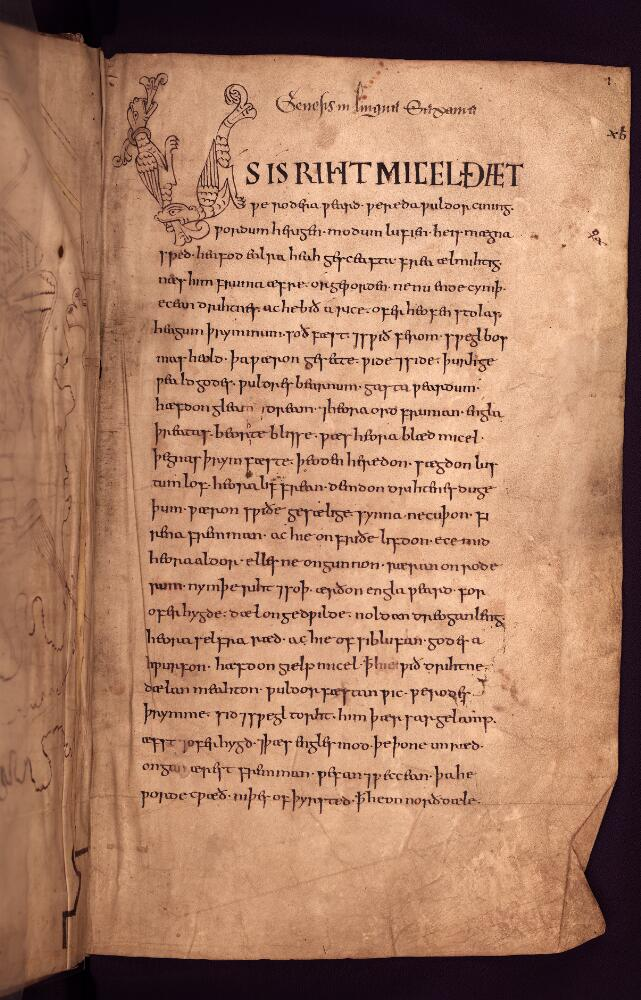
Opening folio of Genesis A in Bodleian Libraries, Junius 11.

Genesis A (or Elder Genesis) is an Old English poetic adaptation of about the first half of the biblical book of Genesis. The poem is fused with a passage known today as Genesis B, translated and interpolated from the Old Saxon Genesis.

Genesis A (and B) survive in the Junius Manuscript, which has been held in the Bodleian Library at the University of Oxford since 1677.

== Lacunae ==
The sole manuscript containing Genesis A is incomplete, with a number of leaves missing. This means that, as we have it today, there are gaps (lacunae) in the poem. Paul G. Remley has estimated the number of missing lines thus:

text	lines
Genesis A	1-168
lacuna	62
Genesis A	169-205
lacuna	no detectable textual loss
Genesis A	206-34
lacuna	70
Genesis B	235-441
lacuna	116
Genesis B	442-851
Genesis A	852-2045
lacuna	no detectable textual loss
Genesis A	2046-381
lacuna	20
Genesis A	2382-418
lacuna	61
Genesis A	2419-512
lacuna	18
Genesis A	2513-99
lucuna	36
Genesis A	2600-806
lacuna	19
Genesis A	2807-2936

The total length of the combined Genesis A and B poems when the Junius Manuscript was complete was therefore around 3339 lines.

== Summary ==
Genesis A begins before Biblical Genesis—not with the creation of the world but with the creation of Heaven and the angels and with Satan's war on Heaven. Then the poet describes the days of creation, culminating with the creation of Adam and a description of the Garden of Eden. After this, the poem scholars call Genesis B resumes the story of Adam in the Garden, while also going back to the war on Heaven Genesis A already discussed. Following the material from Genesis B, the poem is a fairly close translation of the Biblical book of Genesis up to and including the sacrifice of Isaac (Genesis 22.13).

== Textual background ==
Scholars consider the poem in the Junius manuscript of separate authorship than Genesis B, though both are presented concurrently in the Junius Manuscript. Charles Leslie Wrenn even considers Genesis A to be a composite work.

Scholars such as Wrenn once considered the work to be partially written by Cædmon, though as far back as Laurence Michel in 1947 there were critics: he calls the attribution based on "circumstantial evidence" and that any connection "may be laid to the prevalence of well-known pious introductory formulas".

== Editions and translations ==
The editions and translations of Genesis A include:

- Krapp, George Philip, ed. (1931), The Junius Manuscript, The Anglo-Saxon Poetic Records: A Collective Edition, New York: Columbia University Press, ISBN 9780231087650, OCLC 353894. https://web.archive.org/web/20181206091232/http://ota.ox.ac.uk/desc/3009
- Doane, A. N. (ed.), Genesis A: A New Edition (Madison, Wisconsin, 1978)
- Genesis A & B are edited along with digital images of their manuscript pages, and translated, in the Old English Poetry in Facsimile Project eds. Foys, Martin et al. (University of Wisconsin, Madison, 2019-)
- Ophelia Eryn Hostetter's translation

== See also ==
- Genesis B
- Old Saxon Genesis
