= Fitt (poetry) =

In Old Saxon poetry, Old English poetry, and Middle English poetry, the term fit(t) (Old English: fitt, Middle English fit(t)(e), fyt(t)(e), Old Saxon *fittia) was used to denote a section (or canto) of a long narrative poem, and the term (spelled both as fitt and fit) is still used in modern scholarship to refer to these (though in Old and Middle English the term seems actually to have been used more often to mean 'poem, song'). The term appears in the Latin preface to the Old Saxon Heliand in the form vitteas, and its usage in line 709 of Geoffrey Chaucer's tale of "Sir Thopas" has attracted particular commentary, since here the poem's narrator (a fictionalised representation of Geoffrey Chaucer himself) comments explicitly on arriving at a fitt-division in the poem he is reciting.
