= Agathe Lasch =

German philologist

- Education: Heidelberg University
- Known for: Grammar and dictionary of Middle Low German, and linguistics of Berlin and Hamburg dialects
- Scientific career
- Fields: German studies, Linguistics, Philology
- Workplaces: Bryn Mawr College (1910–1916); University of Hamburg (1917–1934)

Agathe Lasch (born 4 July 1879, in Berlin; died 18 August 1942, in Riga) was a German philologist. She was the first female professor of German studies in Germany, and the first female professor at the University of Hamburg. She is a pioneer of the historical study of the Middle Low German language. Lasch was Jewish and was murdered during the Holocaust.

== Life ==
Lasch was born into a family of Jewish merchants in 1879. Like her three sisters, she first trained as a teacher (1898) and then taught at various girls' schools and vocational schools until 1906. In 1906 she received her Abitur from the Kaiserin Augusta Gymnasium in Charlottenburg (Berlin). After this she was able to study German in Halle and then at Heidelberg under the supervision of Wilhelm Braune, and received her doctorate in 1909, despite the fact that as a woman she was not permitted to attend courses in Berlin in 1908. Because of her impressive achievements she was offered a job as Associate Professor at the women's liberal arts college Bryn Mawr in Pennsylvania. Here she produced her Middle Low German grammar around 1914, which is still a standard reference work in Germanic linguistics today. Due to the USA's entry into the First World War, Lasch returned to Germany in 1917 to take up a post as Assistentin in German at Hamburg. Following her habilitation (1919), in 1923 she was the first woman to receive the title of professor at the University of Hamburg, and the first female Germanist to receive this title in all of Germany. In 1926 an extraordinary chair in Low German philology was created for her at Hamburg. There, Lasch continued the study of the linguistic history of Berlin that had begun in her dissertation, and published these in 1928 in her book Berlinisch. In addition, she worked with Conrad Borchling on two large dictionary projects to systematically capture the lexicon of Middle Low German and of the Hamburgisch dialect. In 1928 she was able to publish the first volume of her Middle Low German dictionary (Mittelniederdeutsches Handwörterbuch). The dictionary of Hamburgisch only started to appear in 1956 on the basis of her preparations.

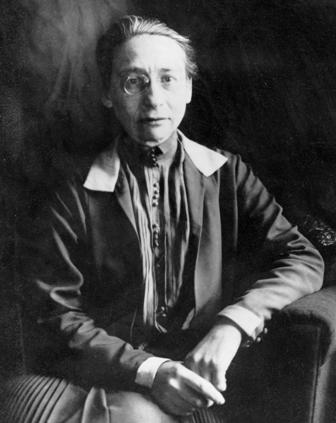
Lasch in the mid-1920s

Researchers from abroad were briefly able to prevent her being dismissed immediately once the Nazi Party came to power, but in 1934 she was nevertheless stripped of her professorship. In 1937 she moved to Berlin to live with her sisters and attempted to continue her research. She was banned from publishing, and was no longer allowed to use public libraries. In addition, on 8 December 1938, Jewish researchers lost their previous special right to use university libraries. Her own library of around 4,000 volumes was seized and confiscated on 9 July 1942. The German government prevented her from taking up job offers at universities abroad (Tartu and later Oslo). On 13 August 1942 she and her sisters were ordered to a concentration camp, and on 15 August she was deported to Riga. She never reached the ghetto, but was murdered on 18 August 1942 in the woods around Šķirotava, shortly after her arrival there.

== Honours and awards ==
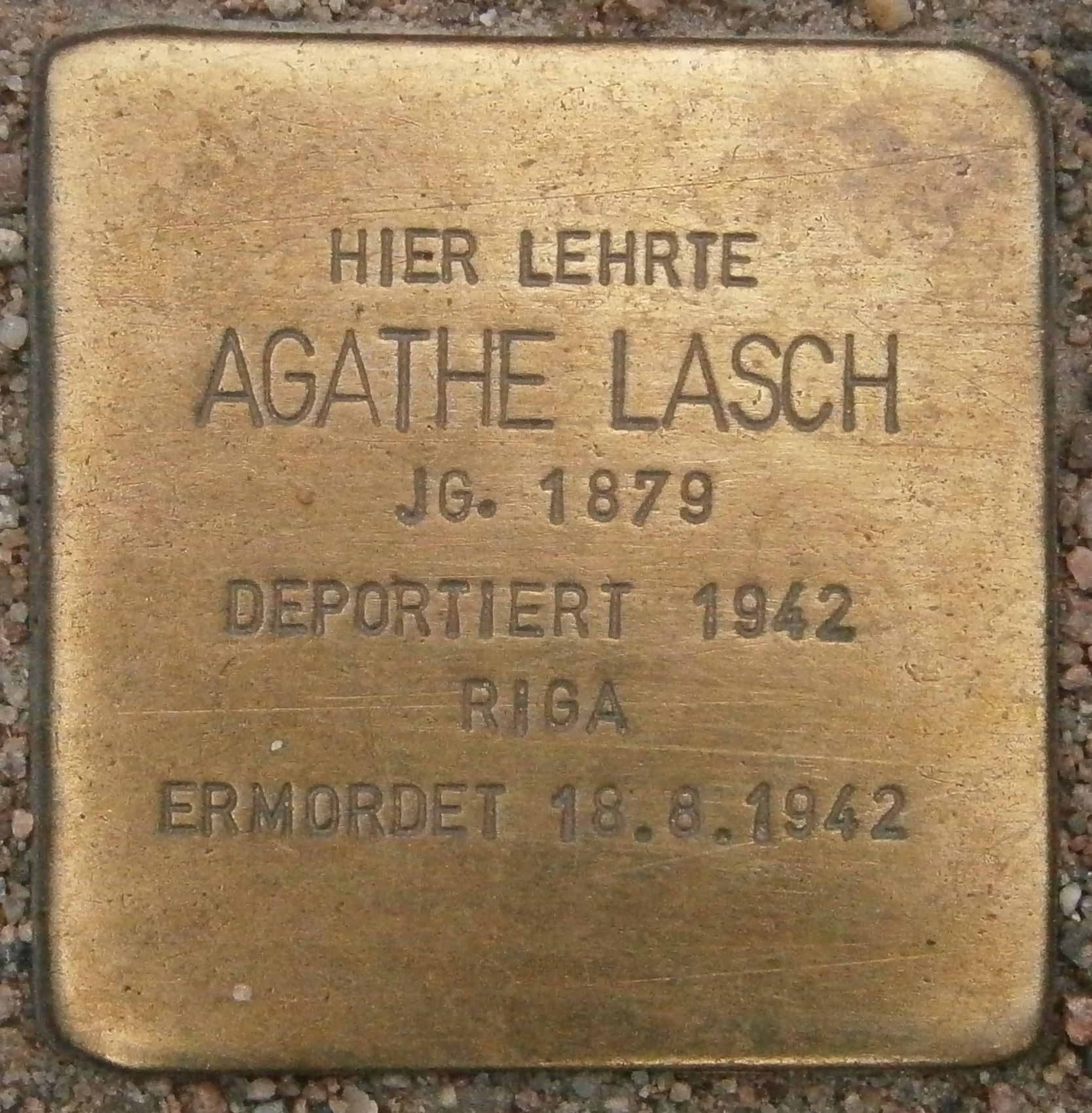
Stolperstein at the University of Hamburg

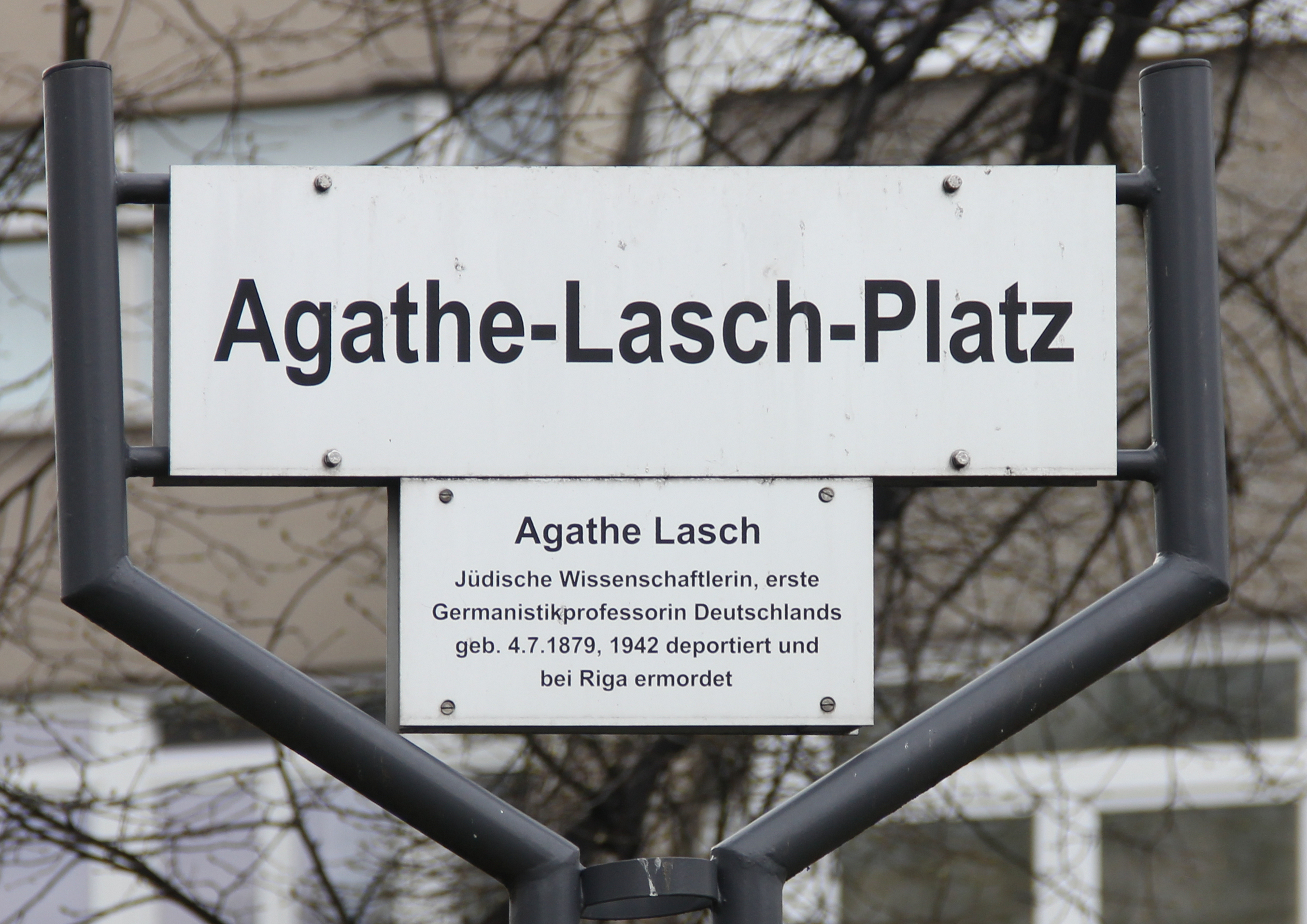
Commemorative plaque in Halensee

In 1970, a street in the Othmarschen quarter of Hamburg was named after her.

Since 1992, the city of Hamburg has offered an Agathe Lasch Prize (€5,000) for exceptional achievements in Low German linguistics.

An auditorium at the University of Hamburg has borne her name since 1999.

In Halensee, Berlin, a city square was named after her in 2004, near to the Kurfürstendamm.

In 2007, on the initiative of the Verein für Hamburgische Geschichte (Hamburg History Association), a Stolperstein (commemorative flagstone) for Agathe Lasch was laid in front of Gustav-Leo-Straße 9, Hamburg. Another Stolperstein can be found in front of the main building of the University of Hamburg, at Edmund-Siemers-Allee 1.

A memorial stone for Agathe Lasch was erected in the Women's Garden at Ohlsdorf Cemetery in Hamburg in 2009 by the Women's Garden Association (Verein Garten der Frauen).

In 2010 another Stolperstein was laid in Schmargendorf, Berlin, in front of Caspar-Theyß-Straße 26, in memory of Agathe Lasch and her sisters Elsbeth and Margarete Lasch.

== Works ==
- (1909) Geschichte der Schriftsprache in Berlin bis zur Mitte des 16. Jahrhunderts (History of written language in Berlin before the middle of the 16th century). Dissertation, University of Berlin.
- Agathe Lasch (1914). Mittelniederdeutsche Grammatik [Middle Low German Grammar] (in German). Halle (Saale): Max Niemeyer. ASIN B00416B8PU. LCCN 15008211. OCLC 3145389. OL 6575768M. Wikidata Q131355367.
- (1919) Der Anteil des Plattdeutschen am niederelbischen Geistesleben im 17. Jahrhundert (The role of Low German in the spiritual life of the Lower Elbe region in the 17th century). Habilitation thesis, University of Hamburg, 1919.
- (1928) Berlinisch. Eine berlinische Sprachgeschichte (Berlinisch: a linguistic history of Berlin)
- (1928-1934) Mittelniederdeutsches Handwörterbuch (Middle Low German dictionary), vols. 1-7
- (2006) Kleines Hamburgisches Wörterbuch (Concise Hamburgisch dictionary), eds. Beate Hennig, Jürgen Meier. Wachholtz Verlag, Hamburg 2006, ISBN 3-529-04650-7.

== Literature ==
- Conrad Borchling: Agathe Lasch zum Gedächtnis. Ansprache auf der Jahresversammlung des Vereins für niederdeutsche Sprachforschung zu Goslar am 28. September 1946. In Niederdeutsche Mitteilungen. Herausgegeben von der Niederdeutschen Arbeitsgemeinschaft zu Lund, vol. 2, 1946, pp. 7–20.
- Matthias Harbeck, Sonja Kobold: Spurensicherung – Provenienzforschung zur Bibliothek von Agathe Lasch. Ein Projekt der Universitätsbibliothek der Humboldt-Universität zu Berlin. In Stefan Alker et al. (eds.): Bibliotheken in der NS-Zeit. Provenienzforschung und Bibliotheksgeschichte. VR Unipress, Göttingen et al. 2008, ISBN 978-3-89971-450-0.
- Christine M. Kaiser, Agathe Lasch (1879–1942): erste Germanistikprofessorin Deutschlands, Teetz et al.: Hentrich & Hentrich / Berlin: Stiftung Neue Synagoge, Centrum Judaicum, 2007, (Jüdische Miniaturen; vol. 63), ISBN 3-938485-56-6.
- Christine M. Kaiser: ‚Ich habe Deutschland immer geliebt...‘ Agathe Lasch (1879-1942). In Joist Grolle, Matthias Schmoock (eds.): Spätes Gedenken. Hamburg 2009, ISBN 978-3-8378-2000-3, pp. 65–98.
- Jürgen Meier (1982). "Lasch, Agathe". Neue Deutsche Biographie (in German). Vol. 13. Berlin: Duncker & Humblot. pp. 645–646. (full text online).
- Lexikon deutsch-jüdischer Autoren. Volume 15. Saur, München 2007, pp. 170–174

== Links ==
- agathe-lasch.de – Website on the life and works of Agathe Lasch
- Explanation of the naming of Agathe-Lasch-Platz by the Charlottenburg-Wilmersdorf local authorities
- Universität Hamburg: Das Hamburgische Wörterbuch of the Institut für Germanistik. 5 vols., Wachholtz Verlag, Neumünster 2006.
- Ingrid Schröder: „… den sprachlichen Beobachtungen geschichtliche Darstellung geben“ – die Germanistikprofessorin Agathe Lasch in: Rainer Nicolaysen: Das Hauptgebäude der Universität Hamburg als Gedächtnisort (PDF; 9,5 MB)
- Inge Stephan, “tear down outdated […] views”. Agathe Lasch, an academic revolutionary, in: Key Documents of German-Jewish History, April 25, 2021, https://dx.doi.org/10.23691/jgo:article-278.en.v1
