= Canto =

Division of a long poem

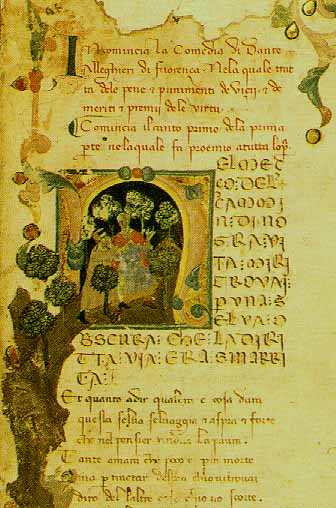
Detail of a 14th-century manuscript of Dante Alighieri's Commedia, a three-part poem (Inferno, Purgatorio, Paradiso) that was divided into 100 cantos.

The canto (Italian pronunciation: [ˈkanto]) is a principal form of division in medieval and modern long poetry.

== Etymology and equivalent terms ==
The word canto is derived from the Italian word for "song" or "singing", which comes from the Latin cantus, "song", from the infinitive verb canere, "to sing". This, in turn, derives from the Proto-Indo-European (PIE) root *kan-, meaning "to sing". The root refers to making sound, chanting, or singing, and is the source of many words (in Indian & European languages) related to vocal music, such as chant, canticle, and incantation.

In Old Saxon poetry, Old English poetry, and Middle English poetry, the term fitt was sometimes used to denote a section of a long narrative poem, and that term is sometimes used in modern scholarship of this material instead of canto.

== Form and use ==
The use of the canto was described in the 1911 edition of the Encyclopædia Britannica as "a convenient division when poetry was more usually sung by the minstrel to his own accompaniment than read". There is no specific format, construction or style for a canto and it is not limited to any one type of poetry.

The typical length of a canto varies greatly from one poem to another. The average canto in the Divine Comedy is 142 lines long, while the average canto in Os Lusíadas is 882 lines long.

== Examples ==
Some famous poems that employ the canto division are Ezra Pound's The Cantos (116 cantos), Dante's Divine Comedy (with 100 cantos), Sri Aurobindo's Savitri (49 cantos), Ludovico Ariosto's Orlando Furioso (46 cantos), Torquato Tasso's Gerusalemme liberata (20 cantos), Byron's Don Juan (17 cantos, the last of which is unfinished) and Camões' Os Lusíadas (10 cantos).

== General references ==
- Dutt, Romesh C. (2004). Ramayana. Kessinger Publishing. p. 208. ISBN 978-1-4191-4387-8.
