= Karl Zangemeister =

German librarian and philologist

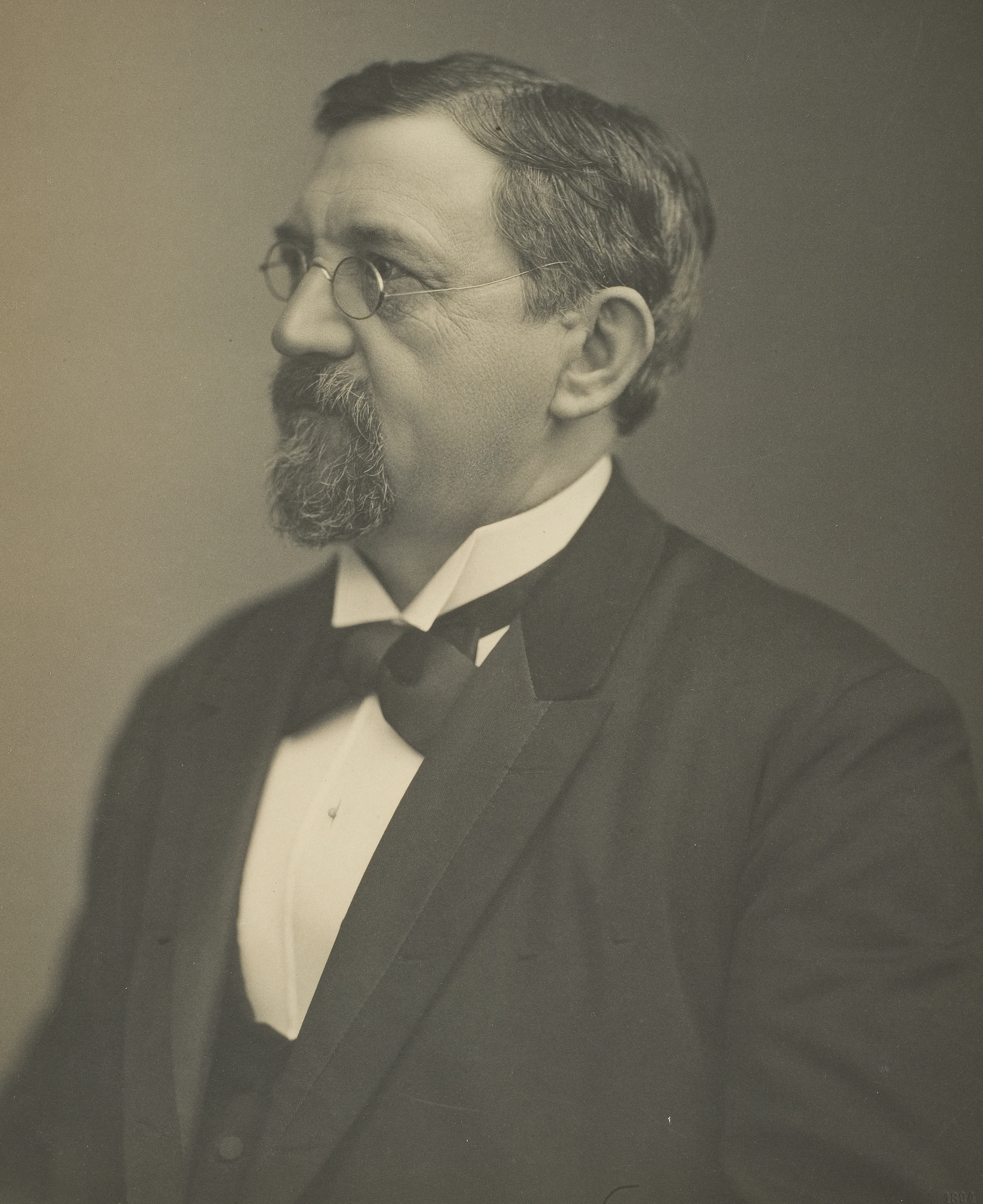
Karl Zangemeister, 1894

Karl Friedrich Wilhelm Zangemeister (28 November 1837, in Hallungen, Saxe-Coburg and Gotha – 8 June 1902, in Heidelberg) was a German librarian and philologist.

== Biography ==
He studied classical philology at the universities of Berlin and Bonn, receiving his doctorate in 1862 with the thesis De Horatii vocibus singularibus dissertatio. Afterwards, he worked on the Corpus Inscriptionum Latinarum project in Italy, and from 1868 to 1873 was a librarian at the Ducal Library in Gotha. In 1873 he relocated to the University of Heidelberg as senior librarian, being named a professor of classical philology in 1875. From 1894 to 1902 he was associated with the Central Directorate of the Königlichen Archäologischen Instituts (Royal Archaeological Institute).

== Selected works ==
- Inscriptiones Pompeianae parietariae et vasorum fictilium (with August Mau, 1871).
- Berichte über die im Auftrage der Kirchenvater commission unternommene Durchforschung der Biblitheken Englands, 1877 – Reports on the undertakings on behalf of the Church Fathers Commission investigation of the libraries of England.
- System des Real-Katalogs der Universitäts-Bibliothek Heidelberg, 1885 – System of Real Catalogs at the University Library in Heidelberg.
- Orosius, Historiarum adversum paganos libri VII; accedit eiusdem, Liber apologeticus, ed. by Karl Zangemeister, Corpus Scriptorum Ecclesiasticorum Latinorum, 5 (Vienna: Teubner, 1882).
- Pauli Orosii historiarum adversum paganos libri VII, ed. by Karl Friedrich Wilhelm Zangemeister, Bibliotheca scriptorum Graecorum et Romanorum Teubneriana (Leipzig: Teubner, 1899).
- Die wappen, helmzierden und standarten der Grossen Heidelberger liederhandschrift (Manesse-codex), 1892 – The coat of arms, crests and standards of the Great Heidelberg Liederhandschrift (Codex Manesse).
- Bruchstücke der altsächsischen Bibeldichtung aus der Bibliotheca Palatina (with Wilhelm Braune, 1894) – Fragments of Old Saxon Bible literature from the Bibliotheca Palatina.
- Theodor Mommsen als Schriftsteller : ein Verzeichnis seiner Schriften (with Emil Jacobs, 1905) – Theodor Mommsen as a writer; a directory of his writings.
