= Edward Lye =

English priest

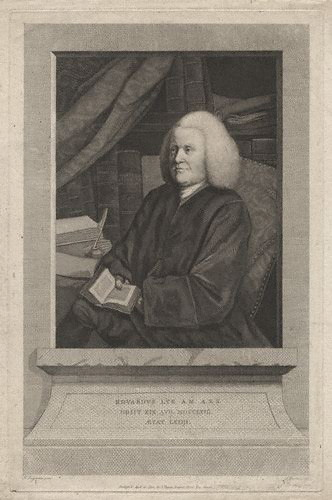
- Engraving of Edward Lye by Thomas Burke (1784), after a portrait by Frances Reynolds.
- Born: 1694; Totnes, Devon
- Died: August 27, 1767; Yardley Hastings
- Education: Hart Hall, Oxford
- Known for: Fellow of the Society of Antiquaries.

Edward Lye (1694–1767) was an 18th-century scholar of Old English and Germanic philology.

His Dictionarium Saxonico et Gothico-Latinum, published posthumously in 1772, was a milestone in the development of Old English lexicography, surpassed only by, and substantially contributing to Joseph Bosworth's Dictionary of the Anglo-Saxon language of 1838.

== Life ==
He was born at Totnes, Devon, the son of Thomas Lye, vicar of Broadhempston and a schoolmaster at Totnes, by his wife Catherine (née Johnson). He was educated at his father's school and at Crewkerne school, Somerset. He went to Hart Hall, Oxford, where he entered 28 March 1713, and graduated B.A. 19 October 1716, M.A. 6 July 1722. He was ordained in 1717, and in 1721 was admitted vicar of Houghton Parva, Northamptonshire.

On 4 January 1750, he was elected Fellow of the Society of Antiquaries. He resigned Houghton Parva about 1750, on being presented by James Compton, 5th Earl of Northampton to the rectory of Yardley Hastings, Northamptonshire. He at this time was supporting his mother and his two sisters. Lye died, aged 73, on 19 August 1767 of gout, from which he had long suffered, at Yardley Hastings, where he was buried with a prominent wall monument. His library was sold in 1773.

== Works ==
He began the study of Anglo-Saxon and related languages. In 1743 he published, with additions, the Etymologicum Anglicanum of Francis Junius from manuscripts in the Bodleian Library. To this work he prefixed an Anglo-Saxon grammar.

In 1750, he edited the Gothic version of the gospels, Sacrorum Evangeliorum Versio Gothica (Oxford) with a Latin translation, notes, and a Gothic grammar. About 1737 Lye began to work on an Anglo-Saxon and Gothic dictionary, which he despaired of publishing; in 1765 he was encouraged by a subscription from Archbishop Thomas Secker, and other subscriptions. About thirty sheets were printed just before Lye's death, and the work was posthumously published in 1772 with additions by his friend Owen Manning as Dictionarium Saxonico et Gothico-Latinum (London). The title pages goes on to say "Accedunt fragmenta Versionis Ulphilanæ, necnon Opuscula quædam Anglo-Saxonica."

== Notes ==
=== Attribution ===
This article incorporates text from a publication now in the public domain: Wroth, Warwick William (1893). "Lye, Edward". In Lee, Sidney (ed.). Dictionary of National Biography. Vol. 34. London: Smith, Elder & Co.
