= Franciscus Junius (the younger) =

Dutch philologist (1591–1677)

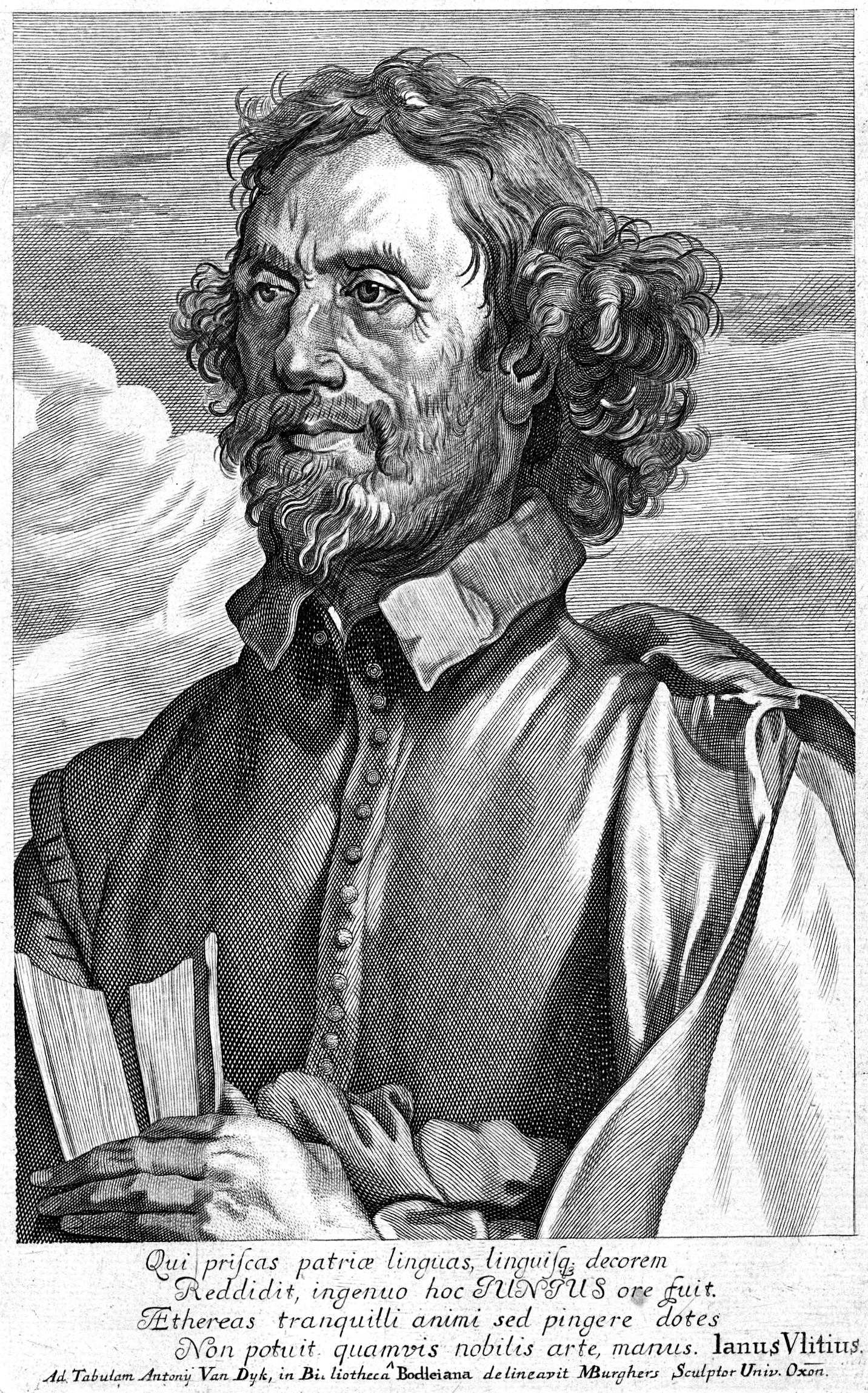
François Junius (Michael Burghers, 1698, after Anthony van Dyck)

Franciscus Junius (29 January 1591–1677), also known as François du Jon, was a pioneer of Germanic philology. As a collector of ancient manuscripts, he published the first modern editions of a number of important texts. In addition, he wrote the first comprehensive overview of ancient writings on the visual arts, which became a cornerstone of classical art theories throughout Europe.

== Life ==
Junius was born in Heidelberg. He was brought up at Leiden, Netherlands, as his father, also called Franciscus Junius, was appointed professor of Hebrew at Leiden University in 1592. In 1602 his parents died, and Junius went to live with his future brother-in-law, the humanist scholar Gerhard Johann Vossius in Dordrecht. His attention was diverted from military to theological studies by the peace of 1609 between Spain and the Netherlands, and he studied theology at Leiden and Middelburg.

In 1617, he became a pastor at Hillegersberg, near Rotterdam. He resigned this position the following year, after he refused to take sides in a theological conflict in the Dutch Reformed Church, centering on faith out of free will as advocated by Jacobus Arminius or faith out of predestination, as defended by Junius' uncle Franciscus Gomarus. After his resignation, Junius elected to travel instead: he visited first France, and then moved to England, where in 1620 he was employed by Thomas Howard, earl of Arundel, as a tutor to his son, and later as librarian. It was for Arundel, an avid collector of Greek and Roman art objects, that Junius wrote his De pictura veterum, a theoretical discussion of classical art and one of the cornerstones of the Neoclassical movement. Published in 1637 in Latin, it was followed by his own translations into English (1638) and Dutch (1641); the latter edition was written with a readership of artists in mind.

Junius remained resident in England for more than twenty years, but upon the revolt against Charles I in 1642, he joined the Earl and his wife to the Low Countries. Soon after his return in Holland, Junius became interested in the history of the Dutch language, an interest that quickly spread to the oldest phases of other Germanic languages. As a result, he published a commentary on an Old High German paraphrase of the Song of Songs, the first edition of a collection of Old English poems, and the first edition, together with an extensive dictionary, of the Gothic Gospels. Upon his death a number of lexicographical works remained unpublished, of which an English etymological dictionary was published posthumously. Samuel Johnson's Dictionary used two main sources for its Teutonic etymologies: Junius's Etymologicum Anglicanum (in a posthumous edition edited by Edward Lye) and Stephen Skinner's Etymologicon Linguæ Anglicanæ.

Junius was the owner of an important piece of Christian literature called the MS Junius 11 codex, also known as the "Cædmon manuscript", or "Junius" codex. Junius was a close acquaintance of John Milton. It has been suggested that similarities between Milton's Paradise Lost and parts of the "Genesis" material in MS Junius 11, are the result of Milton having consulted MS Junius 11 via Junius, though this hypothesis cannot be proven.

The first mention of the Heliand in modern times occurred when Junius found a fragment in 1587.

Junius was the first person to substantially study the Codex Argenteus (or Gothic Bible). He first showed an interest in Gothic in 1654, and engaged in a study of the Codex Argenteus in 1654. Isaac Vossius entrusted the codex to Junius. Vossius had secured the codex from Queen Christina as part of a debt settlement. MS Junius 55 is a transcript Junius made of the full text of the original manuscript. Junius engaged Jan van Vliet in his study of Gothic.

The earliest extant reference to the first foliation of the Nowell Codex (British Library MS Cotton Vitellius A.xv), which contains the poem Beowulf, was made sometime between 1628 and 1650 by Junius.

In 1675, Junius returned to Oxford and died in November 1677 at the house of his nephew Isaac Vossius in Windsor, Berkshire; he was buried there at St George's Chapel. In his life he had amassed a large collection of ancient manuscripts, and in his will he bequeathed these to the Bodleian Library at the University of Oxford. Amongst the works included in this bequest were a major manuscript of Anglo-Saxon poetry, commonly known as the Junius manuscript after him, and the unique manuscript of the Ormulum.

== Works ==
In his later life, Junius devoted himself to the study of the Old Germanic languages. His work, while intrinsically valuable, is particularly important as having aroused interest in a subject that at the time was often neglected.

Major works include:

- 1637, De pictura veterum translated as On the Painting of the Ancients in 1638, and as De Schilder-konst der Oude begrepen in drie boecken in 1641, reprinted 1659.

A second edition of De pictura, enlarged and improved by himself and augmented with an index, was published posthumously by J. G. Graevius in 1694, with a life of Junius included as a preface.

- 1655, Observationes in Willerami Abbatis Francicam paraphrasin Cantici Canticorum

"Notes on Abbot Williram's Frankish paraphrase of the Song of Songs"

- 1655, Annotationes in harmoniam Latino-Francicam quatuor evangelistarum, latine a Tatiano confectam

"Annotations on the Latin-Frankish harmony of the four Gospels, with the Latin of Tatian" (i.e. the Diatessaron)

- 1655, Cædmonis monachi paraphrasis poetica Genesios ac praecipuarum sacrae paginae historiarum, abhinc annos M.LXX. Anglo-Saxonice conscripta, et nunc primum edita

"The poetical paraphrase by the monk Cædmon of Genesis and the other principal pages of sacred history, composed in Anglo-Saxon 1070 years ago, and now edited for the first time".
The first edition of the important poetical codex now designated Bodleian Library MS Junius 11. While it is no longer believed that Cædmon wrote the poems it contains, it is still commonly known as the Cædmon manuscript.

- 1664, Gothicum Glossarium, quo Argentii Codicis Vocabula explicantur

"A glossary of words of the Gothic language as found in the Codex Argenteus"

- 1665, Quatuor Domini Nostri Iesu Christi Evangeliorum Versiones perantiquae duae, Gothica scilicet et Anglo-Saxonica

"The Four Gospels of Our Lord Jesus Christ in two ancient versions, namely the Gothic and the Anglo-Saxon"
The Gothic version is Ulfilas' translation, and was edited by Junius from the Codex Argenteus. The Anglo-Saxon version was edited by Thomas Marshall. Junius' Gothic glossary (above) was included, along with Marshall's notes.

- 1743, Etymologicum anglicanum

"English Etymology"
Published posthumously in an edition by Edward Lye, who included a life of Junius and George Hickes's Anglo-Saxon grammar.

== Notes ==
1. Junius' date of birth has been variously estimated as 1589, 1590, and 1591. The precise date given here was established by Johan Kerling, cited by Rademaker (1998:3). For the original article, see Johan Kerling, 'Franciscus Junius, 17th-century Lexicography and Middle English' in: Lexeter '83 Proceedings, ed. R.R.K. Hartmann, Max Niemeyer Verlag Tübingen 1984, pp. 92–100.
