= Junius manuscript =

Tenth century Anglo-Saxon manuscript

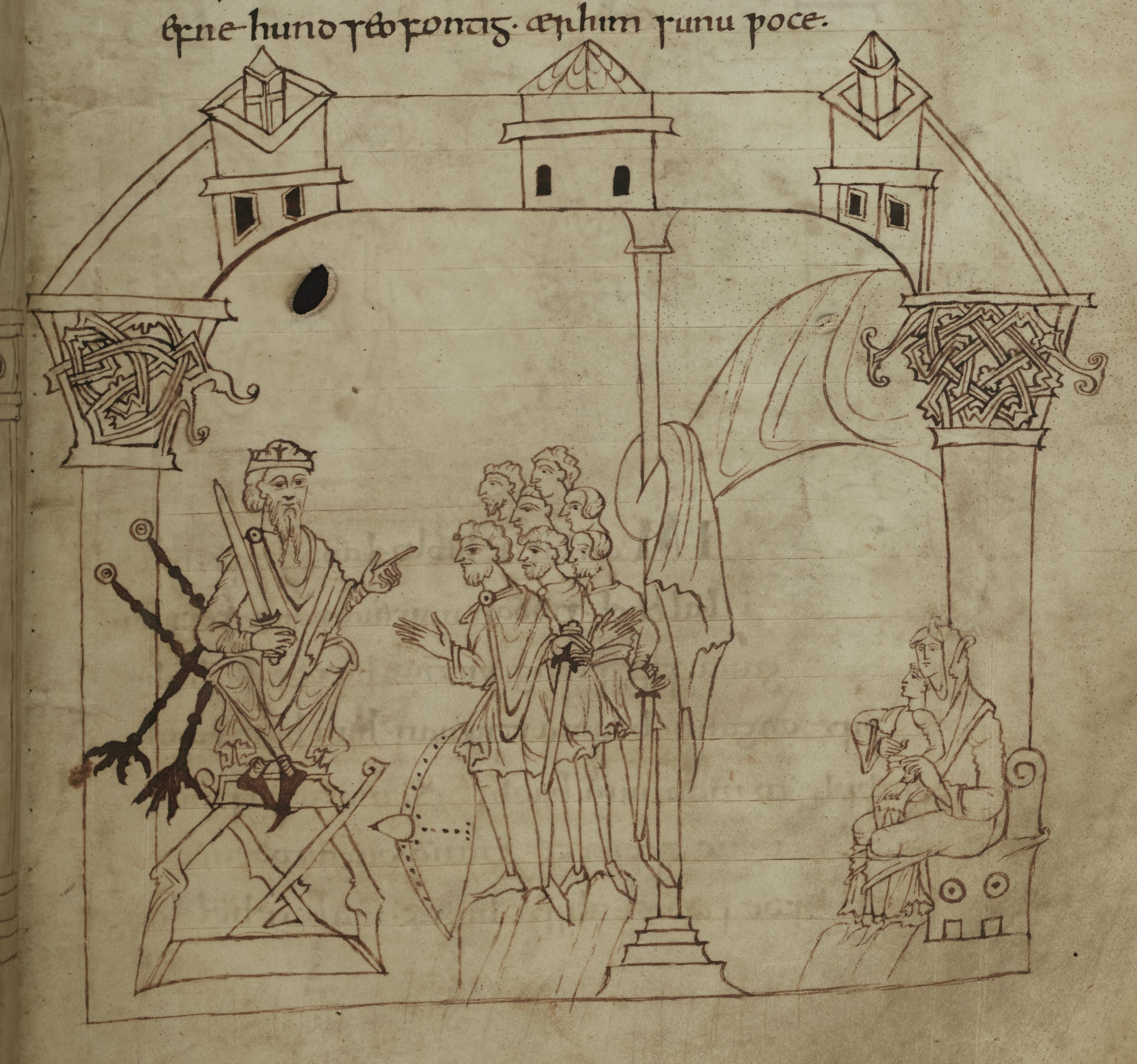
An illustration of patriarch Kenan, from the Junius manuscript.

The Junius manuscript is one of the four major codices of Old English literature. Written in the 10th century, it contains poetry dealing with Biblical subjects in Old English, the vernacular language of Anglo-Saxon England. Modern editors have determined that the manuscript is made of four poems, to which they have given the titles Genesis, Exodus, Daniel, and Christ and Satan. The identity of their author is unknown. For a long time, scholars believed them to be the work of Cædmon, accordingly calling the book the Cædmon manuscript. This theory has been discarded due to the significant differences between the poems.

The manuscript owes its current designation to the Anglo-Dutch scholar Franciscus Junius, who was the first to edit its contents and who bequeathed it to Oxford University. It is kept in the Bodleian Library under shelfmark MS Junius 11. The first edition of its contents appeared in 1655.

== Name and date ==
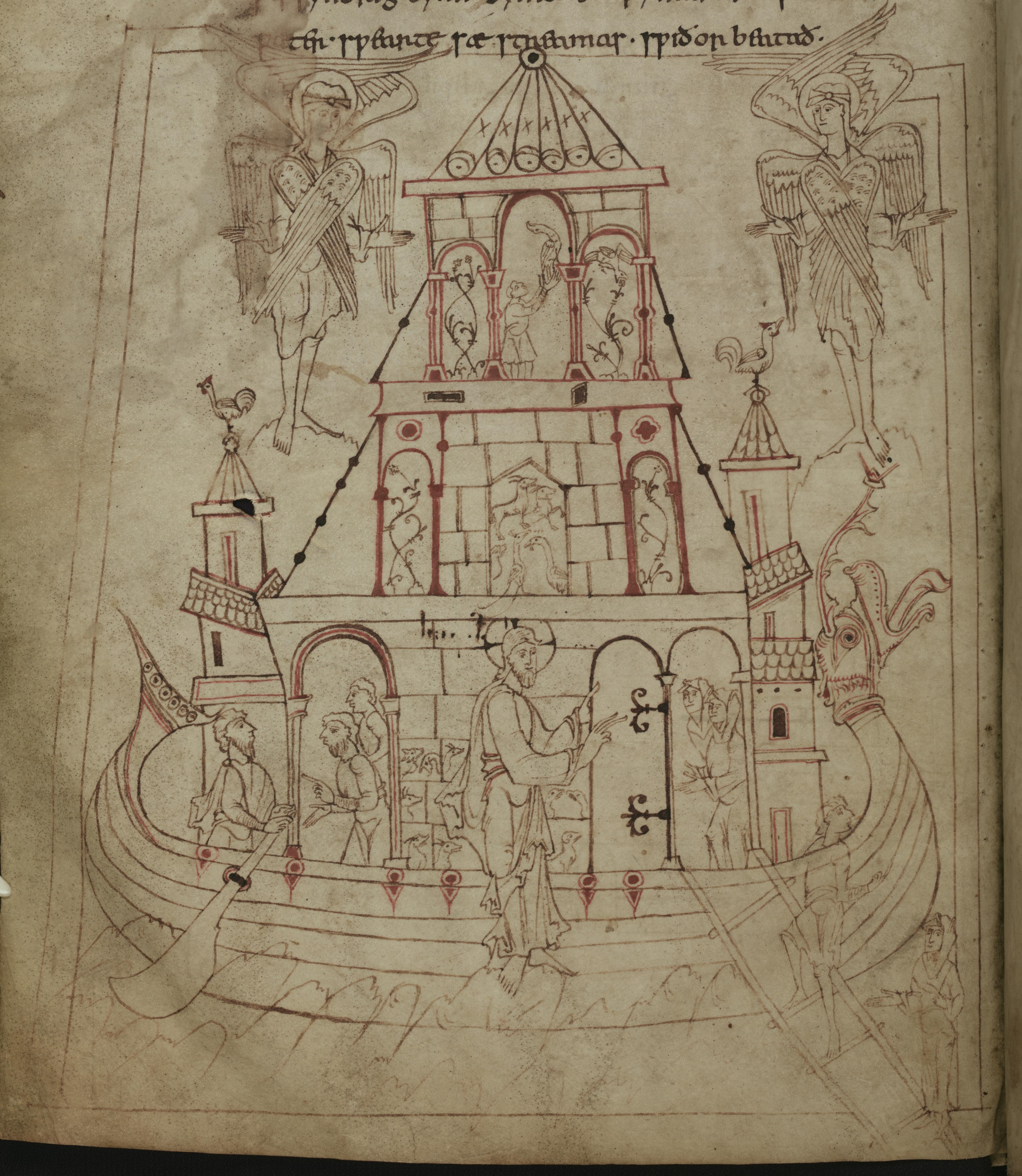
An illustration of a ship from the Cædmon manuscript.

The codex now referred to as the "Junius manuscript" was formerly called the "Cædmon manuscript" after an early theory that the poems it contains were the work of Cædmon; the theory is no longer considered credible, therefore the manuscript it is commonly referred to either by its Bodleian Library shelf mark "MS Junius 11", or more casually as "the Junius manuscript" or "Codex Junius". 'Junius' in these is Franciscus Junius, who published the first edition of its contents in 1655.

It has been established on palaeographical grounds that compilation of the manuscript began c. AD 1000. Recent work has suggested an earlier, narrow window for the likely compilation date to 960–1000 for Liber I and shortly thereafter for Liber II, based on an integrated dating of the text, paleography, and illustrations.

The compilation was in two stages: Liber I contains the poems Genesis, Exodus, and Daniel, and was the work of a single scribe. Liber II contains the poem Christ and Satan. The manuscript contains numerous illustrations that are an example of the Winchester style of drawing, typical of the period and region; it appears that two illustrators worked independently on the manuscript. The first scribe left spaces in the text for other illustrations which were never completed.

== Illustrations ==
The manuscript is partly illustrated with a series of line drawings depicting the events in the text. From spaces left by the scribes, it appears that it was intended that the manuscript be fully illustrated; in the event, the work was left unfinished after only about a third of the artwork had been drawn. This scheme of illustrations, which is unparalleled in other manuscripts of Anglo-Saxon poetry, implies that the manuscript was conceived of as being considerably more important than most vernacular texts; it may have been intended for devotional or didactic use.

== Contents ==
The names themselves of the poems are modern inventions; they are not given titles in the manuscript. As with the majority of Anglo-Saxon writing, the poems are anonymous and their provenance and dating are uncertain.

=== Genesis ===
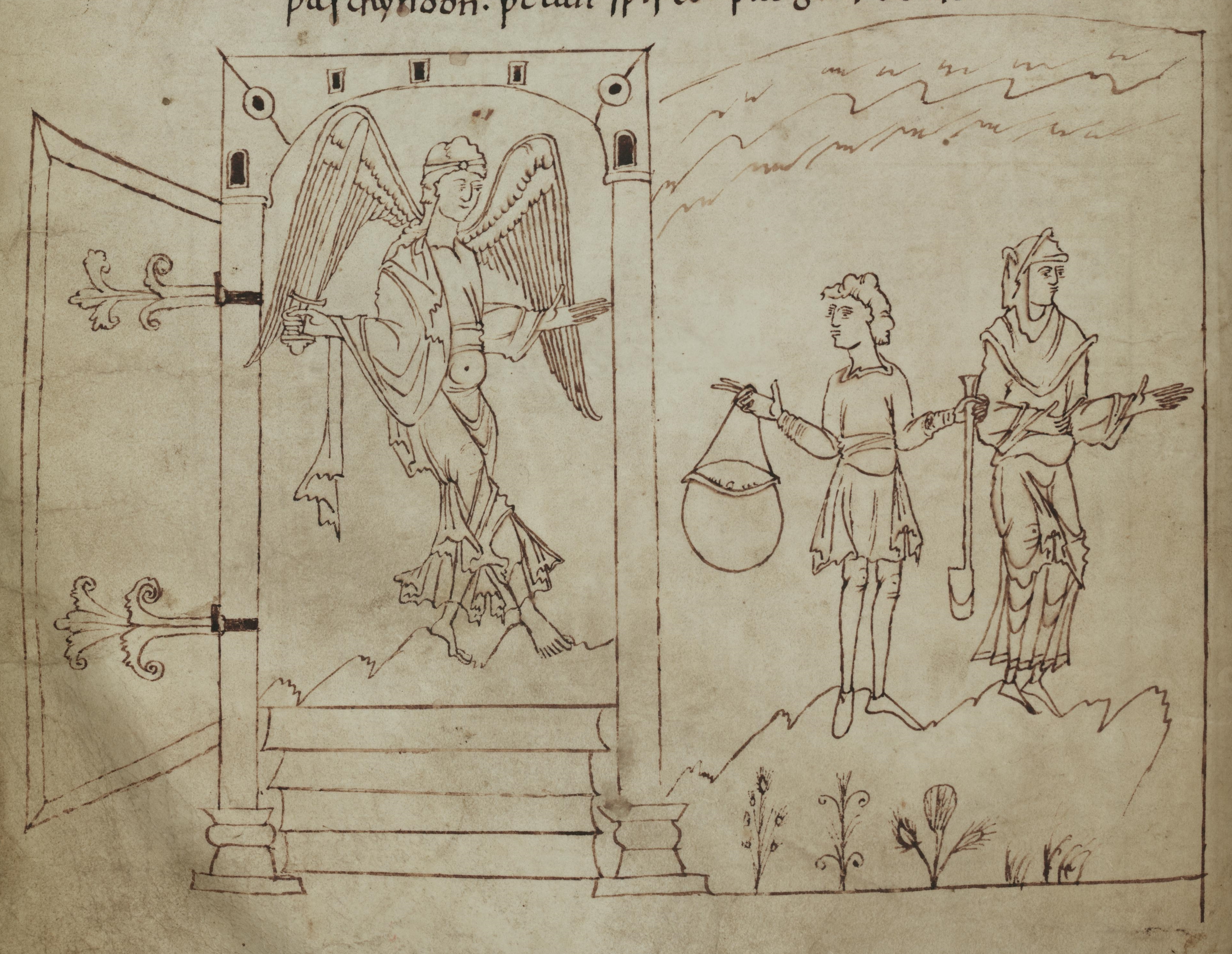
An angel expels Adam and Eve from paradise (p. 46).

Genesis is a paraphrase of the first part of the biblical book of Genesis, from the Creation through to the test of Abraham's faith with the sacrifice of Isaac (Gen. 22).

The work is now recognised as a composite work formed of two originally distinct parts, conventionally referred to as Genesis A and Genesis B; the latter, lines 235–851 of the poem as we have it, appears to have been interpolated from an older poem to produce the current text.

It is Genesis B which has attracted the most critical attention. Its origin is notable in that it appears to be a translation from a ninth-century Old Saxon original; this theory was originally made on metrical grounds, in 1875 by the German scholar Sievers, and then confirmed by the discovery of a fragment of Old Saxon verse that appears to correspond to part of the work in 1894. Thematically and stylistically, it is distinctive: it tells the story of the falls of Satan and Man in an epic style, and has been suggested as an influence for Beowulf, and even, perhaps, for Milton's Paradise Lost.

=== Exodus ===
Exodus is a retelling of the story of the Israelites' Flight from Egypt and the Crossing of the Red Sea.

=== Daniel ===
A short paraphrase of the book of Daniel, dwelling particularly on the story of the Fiery Furnace, deals with the first five chapters of the Book of Daniel.

=== Christ and Satan ===
A three-part poem detailing the Fall of Satan, Christ's harrowing of Hell (from the Apocryphal New Testament Gospel of Nicodemus), and Christ's temptation in the desert.

== Facsimiles ==
- The Cædmon manuscript of Anglo-Saxon Biblical poetry: Junius XI in the Bodleian , ed. by Israel Gollancz (London: Oxford University Press, 1927.)

Digital facsimiles are available online and offline:

- A complete digital facsimile is available through digital Bodleian.

A complete digital facsimile with copious annotations, transcriptions and translations was released on CD format in 2004:

- Muir, Bernard J., ed. (2004), A Digital Facsimile of Oxford, Bodleian Library, MS. Junius 11 (CD-ROM; software by Nick Kennedy), Oxford: Bodleian Library, University of Oxford

== Editions ==
- All of the poems from MS Junius 11 are edited to digital images of their manuscript pages, and translated, in the Old English Poetry in Facsimile project, Martin Foys et al. (eds.). University of Wisconsin-Madison (2019–)

== See also ==
- Anglo-Saxon literature
- Exeter Book
- History of the English Bible
- Nowell Codex
- Old English Bible translations
- Vercelli Book
