= Middle Low German =

Developmental stage of Low German

- Sassisch, Dǖdisch, Nedderlendisch, Ôstersch
- sassesche sprâke (or unnormalised sassche sprake), nedderlendische sprâke (or unnormalised nederlendesche sprake; since the 16th century)
- Region: Northern Central Europe, viz. Northern Germany (roughly the Northern Lowlands), Northeastern Netherlands, Northwestern/North-central (modern) Poland, modern Kaliningrad Oblast, also sporadically in Denmark, Sweden, Norway, Latvia, Estonia (confined to cities)
- Era: 13th to 16th centuries; evolved into Modern Low German; gradually superseded as an official language by High German and (in the far West) Dutch
- Language family: Indo-European: Germanic; West Germanic; North Sea Germanic; Middle Low German
- Early form: Old Saxon
- Dialects: Westphalian; Eastphalian; North Low Saxon, incl. East Frisian—Oldenburgish, Nordalbingian, East Elbian; Brandenburgish
- Writing system: Latin (Fraktur)

Language codes
- ISO 639-3: gml
- Glottolog: midd1318
- Linguasphere: 52-ACB-ca
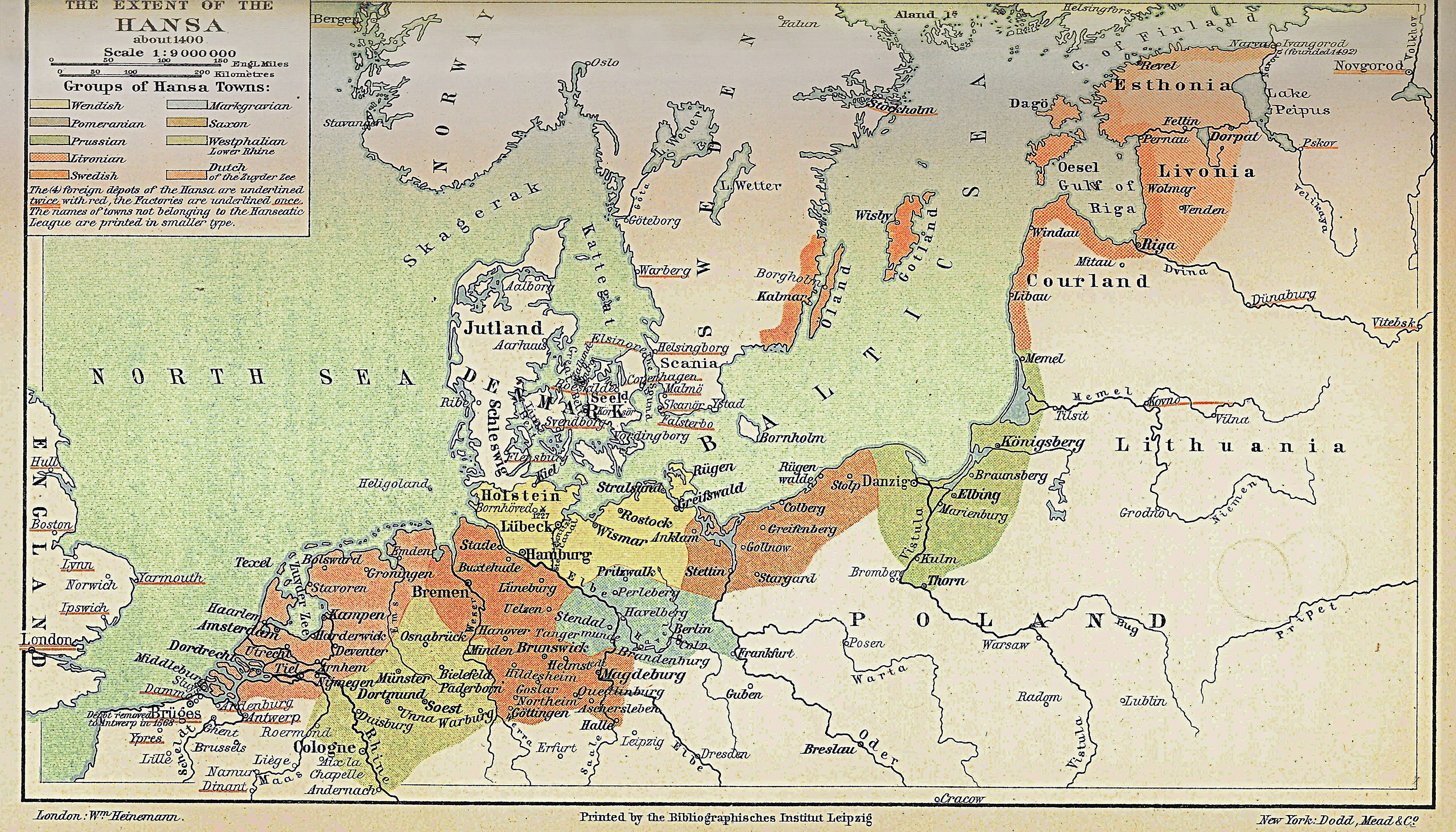
- Northern Europe in 1400, showing the extent of the Hanseatic League

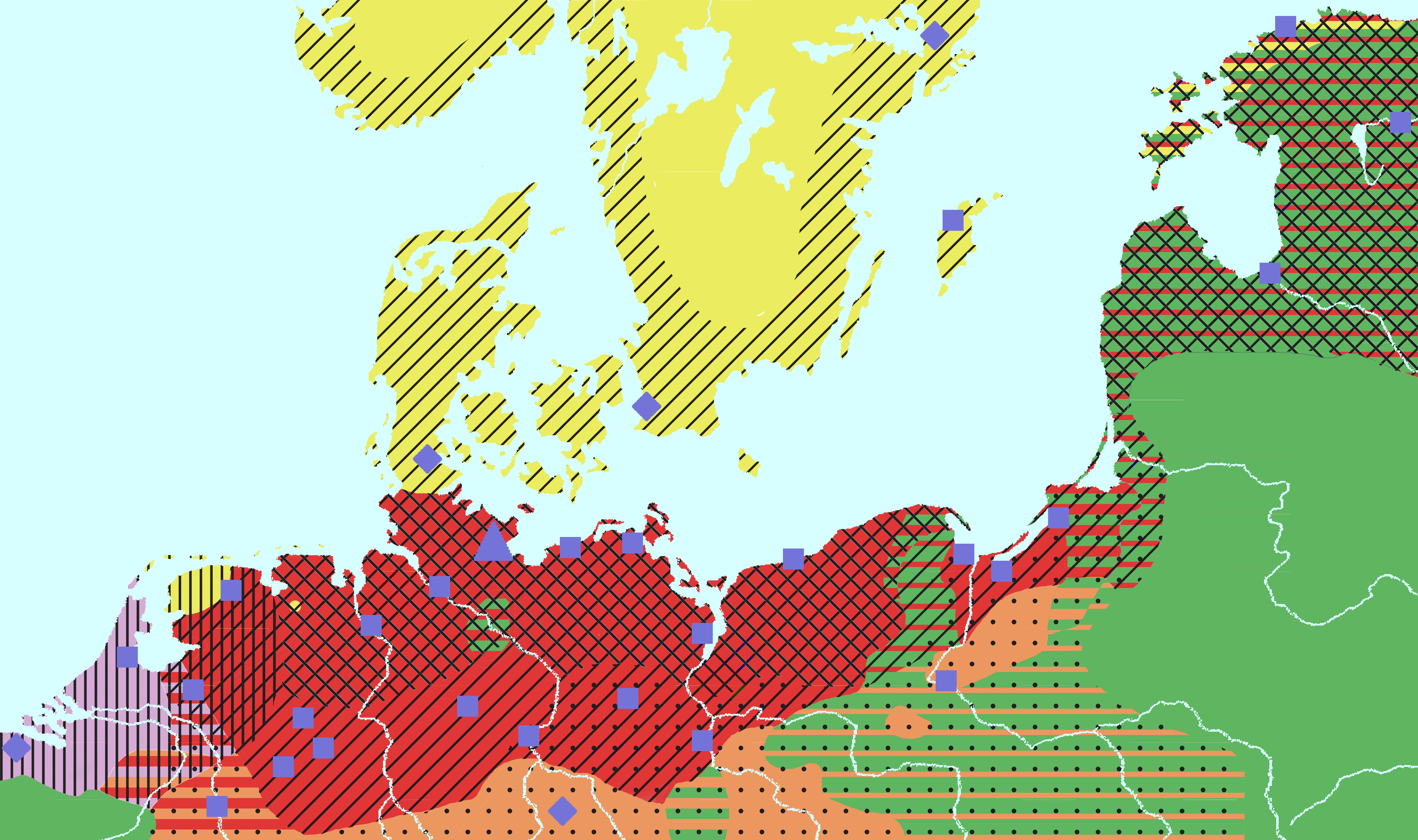
Extent of Middle Low German in red and as literary language (black lines tilted right)

Middle Low German (Note: Low German: Middelsassisk, Middelsassisch, Middelnedderdüüsch or Middelneaderdüütsk,Cd German: Mittelniederdeutsch, Dutch: Middelnederduits), sometimes Middle Low Saxon, is a developmental stage of Low German. It developed from the Old Saxon language in the Middle Ages and has been documented in writing since about 1225–34 (Sachsenspiegel). During the Hanseatic period (from about 1300 to about 1600), Middle Low German was the leading written language in the north of Central Europe and served as a lingua franca in the northern half of Europe. It was used parallel to medieval Latin also for purposes of diplomacy and for deeds.

== Terminology ==
While Middle Low German (MLG) is a scholarly term developed in hindsight, speakers in their time referred to the language mainly as sassisch (Saxon) or de sassische sprâke (the Saxon language). In contrast to Latin as the primary written language, speakers also referred to discourse in Saxon as speaking/writing to dǖde, i.e. 'clearly, intelligibly'. This contains the same root as dǖdisch 'German' (cf., High German: deutsch, Dutch duits (archaically N(i)ederduytsche to mean the contemporary version of the Dutch language) both from Proto-Germanic *þiudiskaz lit. "of the people"; 'popular, vernacular') which could also be used for Low German if the context was clear. Compare also the modern colloquial term Platt(dütsch) (from platt 'plain, simple') denoting Low (or West Central) German dialects in contrast to the written standard.

Another medieval term is ôstersch (lit. 'East-ish') which was at first applied to the Hanseatic cities of the Baltic Sea (the 'East Sea'), their territory being called Ôsterlant ('East-land'), their inhabitants Ôsterlinge ('Eastlings'). This appellation was later expanded to other German Hanseatic cities and it was a general name for Hanseatic merchants in the Netherlands, e.g. in Bruges where they had their komptôr (office; see Kontor).

In the 16th century, the term nedderlendisch (lit. 'Lowland-ish, Netherlandish') gained ground, contrasting Saxon with the German dialects in the uplands to the south. It became dominant in the High German dialects (as ENHG niderländisch, which could also refer to the modern Netherlands), while sassisch remained the most widespread term within MLG. The equivalent of 'Low German' (NHG niederdeutsch) seems to have been introduced later on by High German speakers and at first applied especially to Netherlanders.

Middle Low German is a modern term used with varying degrees of inclusivity. It is distinguished from Middle High German (MHG), spoken to the south, which was later replaced by Early New High German. Though Middle Dutch is today usually excluded from MLG (although very closely related), it is sometimes, especially in older literature, included in MLG, which then encompasses the dialect continuum of all high-medieval Continental Germanic dialects outside MHG, from Flanders in the West to the eastern Baltic.

== Extent ==
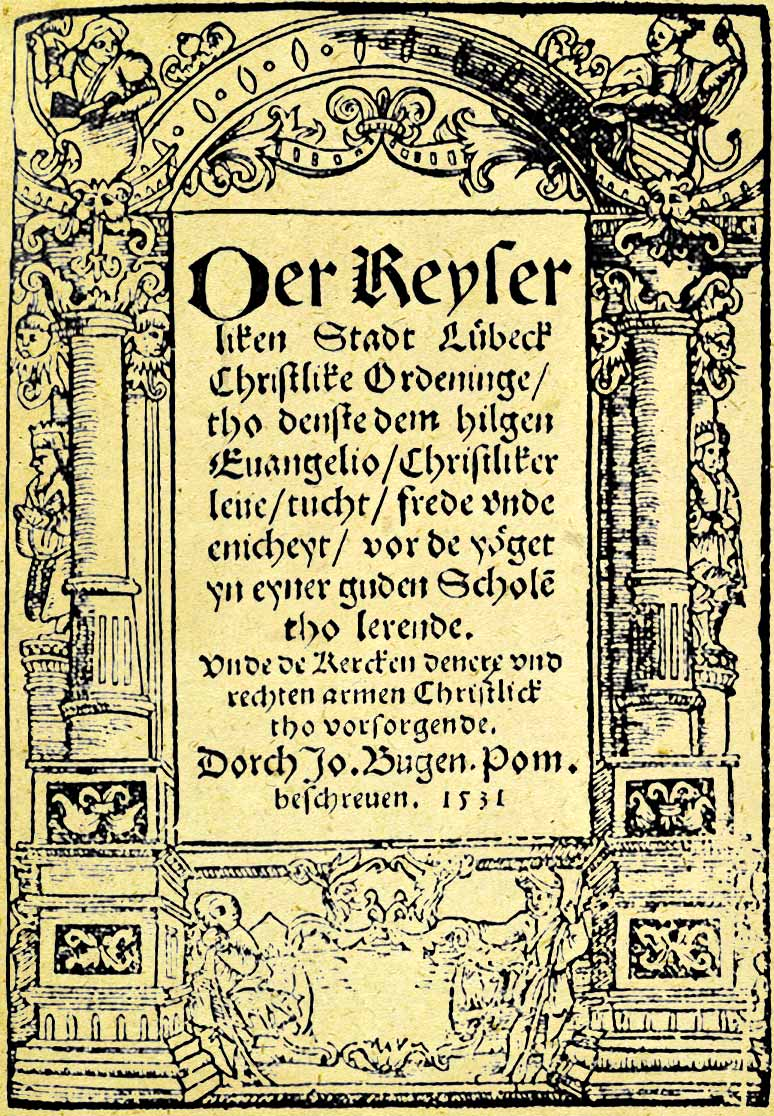
Der Keyserliken Stadt Lübeck Christlike Ordeninge/ tho denste dem hilgen Evangelio/ Christliker leve/ tucht/ frede unde enicheyt/ vor de yöget yn eyner guden Schole[n] tho lerende. Unde de Kercken denere und rechten armen Christlick tho vorsorgende. Dorch Jo. Bugen. Pom. beschreven. 1531. Translates as 'The Imperial City of Lübeck's Christian Ordinance at the service of the Holy Gospel of Christian life, discipline, peace and unity, to teach the youth in a good school, and to provide Christianly for the church servants and the righteous poor. Written by Johannes Bugenhagen the Pomeranian, 1531'.

Middle Low German covered a wider area than the Old Saxon language of the preceding period, due to expansion to the East and, to a lesser degree, to the North. (Note: The following section based on Agathe Lasch (1914).)

In the East, the MLG-speaking area expanded greatly as part of the Ostsiedlung (settlement of the East) in the 12th to 14th century and came to include Mecklenburg, Brandenburg, Pomerania and (Old) Prussia, which were hitherto dominated by Slavic and Baltic tribes. Some pockets of these native peoples persisted for quite some time, e.g. the Wends along the lower Elbe until about 1700 or the Kashubians of Eastern Pomerania up to modern times.

In the North, the Frisian-speaking areas along the North Sea diminished in favour of Saxon, esp. in East Frisia which largely switched to MLG since the mid-14th century. North of the Elbe, MLG advanced slowly into Sleswick, against Danish and North Frisian, although the whole region was ruled by Denmark. MLG exerted a huge influence upon Scandinavia (see § History), even if native speakers of Low German were mostly confined to the cities where they formed colonies of merchants and craftsmen. It was an official language of Old Livonia, whose population consisted mostly of Baltic and Finnic tribes.

In the West, at the Zuiderzee, the forests of the Veluwe and close to the Lower Rhine, MLG bordered on closely related Low Franconian dialects whose written language was mainly Middle Dutch. In earlier times, these were sometimes included in the modern definition of MLG (see § Terminology).

In the South, MLG bordered on High German dialects roughly along the northern borders of Hesse and Thuringia. The language border then ran eastwards across the plain of the middle Elbe until it met the (then more extensive) Sorb-speaking area along the upper Spree that separated it from High German. The border was never a sharp one, rather a continuum. The modern convention is to use the pronunciation of northern maken vs. southern machen ('to make') for determining an exact border. Along the middle Elbe and lower Saale rivers, Low German began to retreat in favour of High German dialects already during Late Medieval times (cf. Wittenberg whose name is Low German but whose inhabitants already spoke mostly/exclusively High German when the Reformation set in).

== History ==
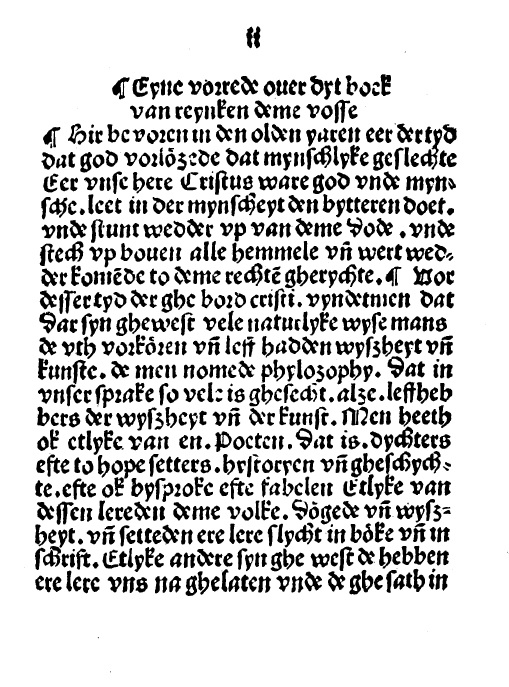
The title of this passage reads Eyne vorrede ouer dyt boek van reynken deme vosse, which translates as 'A prologue about this book of Reynard the Fox'. The typeface is typical for the blackletter used in MLG printing.

Sub-periods of Middle Low German are:

- Early Middle Low German (Standard High German: Frühmittelniederdeutsch): 1200–1350, or 1200–1370
- Classical Middle Low German (klassisches Mittelniederdeutsch): 1350–1500, or 1370–1530
- Late Middle Low German (Spätmittelniederdeutsch): 1500–1600, or 1530–1650

Middle Low German was the lingua franca of the Hanseatic League, spoken all around the North Sea and the Baltic Sea. It used to be thought that the language of Lübeck was dominant enough to become a normative standard (the so-called Lübecker Norm) for an emergent spoken and written standard, but more recent work has established that there is no evidence for this and that Middle Low German was non-standardised.

Middle Low German provided a large number of loanwords to languages spoken around the Baltic Sea as a result of the activities of Hanseatic traders. Its traces can be seen in the Scandinavian, Finnic, and Baltic languages, as well as Standard High German and English. It is considered the largest single source of loanwords in Danish, Estonian, Latvian, Norwegian and Swedish.

Beginning in the 15th century, Middle Low German fell out of favour compared to Early Modern High German, which was first used by elites as a written and, later, a spoken language. Reasons for this loss of prestige include the decline of the Hanseatic League, followed by political heteronomy of northern Germany and the cultural predominance of central and southern Germany during the Protestant Reformation and Luther's translation of the Bible.

== Phonology and orthography ==
The description is based on Lasch (1914) which continues to be the authoritative comprehensive grammar of the language but is not necessarily up-to-date in every detail.

=== Consonants ===
	Labial	Alveolar	Post-alv.	Palatal	Velar	Glottal
Nasal	m	n			[ŋ]	
Stop	p b	t d		[c]	k [ɡ]	
Affricate		(t͡s)				
Fricative	f [v]	s [z]	(ʃ)	[ç] [ʝ]	[x] ɣ	h
Approximant	ʋ	r		j		
Lateral		l				

- Square brackets indicate allophones.
- Round brackets indicate phonemes that do not have phoneme status in the whole language area or are marginal in the phonological system.

It is not rare to find the same word in MLG affected by one of the following phonological processes in one text and unaffected by it in another text because the lack of a written standard, the dialectal variation and ongoing linguistic change during the Middle Low German (MLG) era.

General notes

- Final devoicing: Voiced obstruents in the syllable coda are devoiced, e.g. geven (to give) but gift (gift). The change took place early in MLG but is not always represented in writing. Proclitic words like mid (with) might remain voiced before a vowel because they are perceived as one phonological unit with the following word. Also, as can already be seen in Old Saxon, lenited /b/ is devoiced to [f] before syllabic nasals or liquids, e.g. gaffel (fork) from PG *gabalō.
- Grammatischer Wechsel: Because of sound changes in Proto-Germanic (cf. Verner's law), some words had different sounds in different grammatical forms. In MLG, there were only fossilised remnants of the "grammatischer wechsel" (grammatical change), namely for /s/ and /r/, e.g. kêsen (to choose) but koren ((they) chose), and for /h/ and /ɡ/, e.g. vân < PG *fanhaną (to take hold, to catch) but gevangen < PG *fanganaz (taken hold of, caught).
- Assimilation: A sound becoming more similar to a (usually) neighbouring sound, usually in place or manner of articulation, is very common across all languages. Early MLG did mark assimilation much more often in writing than later periods, e.g. vamme instead of van deme (of the).
- Dissimilation: In MLG, it frequently happened with /l/ vs. /r/ or /l/ vs. /n/, e.g. balbêrer < barbêrer (barber), or knuflôk < kluflôk (garlic). Both forms frequently co-existed. The complete loss of a sound in proximity to an identical sound can also be explained in such a way, e.g. the loss of /l/ in Willem (William) < Wilhelm.
- Metathesis: Some sounds tended to switch their places, especially the "liquids" /l/ and /r/. Both forms may co-exist, e.g. brennen vs. (metathesised) bernen (to burn).
- Gemination: In MLG, geminate consonants, which came into being by assimilation or syncope, were no longer pronounced as such. Instead, geminate spelling marks the preceding vowel as short. Many variants exist, like combinations of voiced and voiceless consonants (e.g. breifve letters, sontdage Sundays). Late MLG tended to use clusters of similar consonants after short as well as long vowels for no apparent reason, e.g. tidth for tîd (time).
- h spellings: A mute h appeared sporadically after consonants already in Old Saxon. Its use greatly increased in MLG, first at the end of a word, when it often marked the preceding vowel as long, but it later appears largely randomly. In very late times, the use of h directly after the vowel is sometimes adopted from Modern High German as a sign of vowel length.

Specific notes on nasals (Indented notes refer to orthography.)

- /m/ had a tendency to shift to /n/ in the coda, e.g. dem > den (the (dat.sg.m.)).
  - Intervocalic /m/ is sometimes spelled mb whether or not it developed from Old Saxon /mb/.
- /n/ assimilated to [ŋ] before velars /k/ and /ɣ/.
- Final /n/ often dropped out in unstressed position before consonants, e.g., hebbe(n) wi (we have), cf. Modern Dutch for a similar process. Similarly, it often dropped from /nɡ/-clusters after unstressed vowels, especially in Westphalian, e.g. jârlix (annually) < jârlings.
- Furthermore, /n/ had been deleted in certain coda positions several centuries earlier (the so-called Ingvaeonic nasal spirant law), but there were many exceptions and restorations through analogy: the shifted form gôs (goose < PG *gans) with an unshifted plural gense (geese) was quite common. Non-shifted forms have been common in the more innovative Eastern dialects.

Specific notes on stops and fricatives

- /b/ as a stop [b] is always word-initially (blôme flower, bloom), at the onset of stressed syllables (barbêrer barber) and (historically) geminated (ebbe ebb, low tide). Its allophones in other cases are word-internal [v] and word-final [f] (e.g. drêven to drive, vs. drêf drive (n.)).
- Voiceless /f/ usually appeared word-initially (e.g. vader father), word-finally (merged with historical /b/, see above), otherwise between short vowels and nasals/liquids (also from historical /b/, e.g. gaffel fork) and in loans (e.g. straffen to tighten, from High German).
  - It was mostly written v in the syllable onset, f(f) in the coda. Exceptions include loans (figûre), some proper names (Frederik), cases like gaffel as mentioned earlier and sporadically before u (where v would be too similar graphically) and before l and r. Sometimes, w is used for v, and ph for f.
  - In MLG (like in other medieval) texts, there is usually no clear graphic distinction between v and u. The distinction between both (consonant value as v, vocalic value as u) is used in modern dictionaries, in grammars and in this article simply for better readability. Thus, in the manuscripts, e.g. auer is aver (but).
- /w/ was originally an approximant [w~ʋ] but seems to have later shifted towards a fricative. Its exact articulation likely differed from dialect to dialect, and many of them merged word-internally with [v], an allophone of /b/.
  - In writing, w for word-internal /w/ was kept strictly separate from [v] at first, but the use of w later also expanded to [v].
  - The clusters /dw-/, /tw-/, /sw-/, /kw-/ were originally often written with v/u (svager brother-in-law) but later mostly shifted to a w-spelling, except for /kw-/, which kept qu from Latin influence.
- The dentals /t/ and /d/ tended to drop out between unstressed vowels, e.g. antwēr (either) instead of antwēder, and in word-final clusters like /-ft/, /-xt/ or /-st/, e.g. often rech next to recht (law, right), schrîf next to schrîft ((he/she) writes).
- Remnants of Old Saxon /θ/ shifted via /ð/ into /d/ in the early MLG era. After /l/ and /n/, it was the case already in late Old Saxon. For /rθ/, word-final /-θ/ and some frequent words like dat (that, the (neut.)), the change also happened very early. The changes happened earliest in Westphalian and latest in North Low Saxon.
- /s/ was voiced intervocalically as [z]. Whether it was voiced word-initially is not fully clear. There seems to have been dialectal variation, with voiceless [s] more likely for Westphalian and voiced [z] more likely for East Elbian dialects.
  - Because of the variation, voiceless /s/ (for example in loans from Romance or Slavic) was often written tz, cz, c etc. for clarity.
- The phonemic status of /ʃ/ is difficult to determine because of the extremely irregular orthography. Its status likely differed between the dialects, with early MLG having /sk/ (Westphalian keeping it until modern times) and no phonemic /ʃ/, and e.g. East Elbian and in general many later dialects had /ʃ/ from earlier /sk/. If there is phonemic /ʃ/, it often replaces /s/ in clusters like /sl-/ and /sn-/.
- Connected with the status of /ʃ/ is the manner of articulation of /s/. Orthographic variants and some modern dialects seem to point to a more retracted, more sh-like pronunciation (perhaps [s̠]), especially if there was no need to distinguish /s/ and /ʃ/. This is consistent with modern Westphalian.
- /t͡s/ is at best a marginal role as a phoneme and appears in loans or develops because of compounding or epenthesis. Note the palatalised /k/ (next point).
  - In writing, it was often marked by copious clustering, e.g. ertzcebischope (archbishop).
- /k/ before front vowels is strongly palatalised in Old Saxon (note the similar situation in the closely related Old English) and at least some of early MLG, as can be seen from spellings like zint for kint (child) and the variation of placename spellings, especially in Nordalbingian and Eastphalian, e.g. Tzellingehusen for modern Kellinghusen. The palatalisation, perhaps as [c] or [t͡ɕ], persisted until the High Middle Ages but was later mostly reversed. Thus, for instance, the old affricate in the Slavic placename Liubici could be reinterpreted as a velar stop, giving the modern name Lübeck. A few words and placenames completely palatalised and shifted their velar into a sibilant (sever beetle, chafer, from PG *kebrô; the city of Celle < Old Saxon Kiellu).
  - Early MLG frequently used c for /k/ (cleyn small), which later became rarer. However, geminate k (after historically short vowels and consonants) continued to be written ck (e.g. klocke bell), more rarely kk or gk.
  - gk otherwise appeared often after nasal (ringk ring, (ice) rink).
  - /ks/ was often written x, especially in the West.
  - /kw/ usually appeared as qu, under Latin influence (quêmen to come).
- Furthermore, after unstressed /ɪ/, /k/ often changed into /ɣ/, e.g. in the frequent derivational suffix -lik (vrüntligen friendly (infl.)) or, with final devoicing, in sich instead of sik (him-/her-/itself, themselves).
  - Sometimes, ch was used for a syllable-final /k/ (ôch also, too). The h can be seen a sign of lengthening of the preceding vowel, not of spirantisation (see "h-spelling" below).
- /ɣ/ was a fricative. Its exact articulation probably differed by dialect. Broadly, there seem to have been dialects that distinguished a voiced palatal [ʝ] and a voiced velar [ɣ], depending on surrounding vowels ([ʝ]: word-initially before front vowels, word-internally after front vowels; [ɣ] in those positions, but with back vowels), and dialects that always used [ʝ] word-initially and word-internally (Eastphalian, Brandenburgian, e.g. word-internally after a back vowel: voyet vogt, reeve). Nevertheless, [ʝ] was kept separate from old /j/. In the coda position, /ɣ/ became a dorsal fricative (palatal [ç] or velar [x], depending on the preceding sound), thus merging with /h/.
  - The spelling gh was at first used almost exclusively before e or word-finally but began to spread to other positions, notably before i. It did not indicate a different pronunciation but was part of an orthographic pattern seen in many other parts of Europe. Furthermore, in early western traditions of MLG, sometimes ch was used for /ɡ/ in all positions, even word-initially.
  - Coda /ɡ/ was mostly spelled ch because it completely merged with historic /h/ (see below).
- After nasals and as a geminate, /ɣ/ appeared as a stop [ɡ], e.g. seggen "to say", penninghe "pennies". In contrast to modern varieties, it remained audible after a nasal. Pronouncing g word-initially as a stop [ɡ] is likely a comparatively recent innovation under High German influence.
  - gg(h) could be used for /ŋɡ/ in older MLG, e.g. Dudiggerode for the town of Düringerode.
- /ɣ/ was frequently dropped between sonorants (except after nasals), e.g. bormêster (burgomaster, mayor) < borgermêster.
- /ɣ/ was often epenthetised between a stressed and an unstressed vowel, e.g. neigen (to sew) < Old Saxon *nāian, or vrûghe (lady, woman) < Old Saxon frūa. In Westphalian, this sound could harden into [g], e.g. eggere (eggs).
- /h/ in the onset was a glottal fricative [h], and it merged with historic /ɣ/ in the coda (see above). Word-final /h/ after consonant or long vowel was frequently dropped, e.g. hôch or hô (high). In a compound or phrase, it often became silent (Willem < Wilhelm William).
  - Onset /h/ was written h, while coda /h/ = [ç~x] was mostly written ch but also g(h) and the like because of its merger with /ɣ/.
- Coda /h/ = [ç~x] frequently dropped between /r/ and /t/, e.g. Engelbert (a first name) with the common component -bert < Old Saxon -ber(a)ht (bright, famous). In unstressed syllables, it could also occur between a vowel and /t/, e.g. nit (not) < Old Saxon niowiht (not a thing).
  - Often, h was used for other purposes than its actual sound value: to mark vowel length (see h-spelling under "General Notes" above), to "strengthen" short words (ghân to go), to mark a vocalic onset (hvnsen our (infl.)) or vowel hiatus (sêhes (of the) lake).

Specific notes on approximants

- /j/ was a palatal approximant and remained separate from [ʝ], the palatal allophone of /ɣ/.
  - It was often spelled g before front vowels and was not confused with gh = [ʝ]. The variant y was sometimes used (yöget youth).
- /r/ was likely an alveolar trill [r] or flap [ɾ], like in most traditional Low German dialects until recently. Post-vocalic /r/ sometimes dropped, especially before /s/.
- /l/ was originally probably velarised, i.e. a "dark l" [ɫ], at least in the coda, judging from its influence on surrounding vowels, but it was never extensively vocalised as Dutch /l/ was. During the MLG era, it seems to have shifted to a "clear l" in many dialects and tended to be dropped in some usually unstressed words, especially in Westphalian, e.g., as(se), instead of alse (as).

=== Vowels ===
Modern renderings of MLG (like this article) often use circumflex or macron to mark vowel length (e.g. â or ā) to help the modern reader, but original MLG texts marked vowel length not by accents but by doubling vowels, by adding a lengthening e or i, by doubling the following consonants (after short vowels) or by adding h after the following consonants.

== Dialects ==
Lasch distinguished the following large dialect groups, emphasising that she based it strictly on the orthography, which may often omit strongly dialectal phenomena in favour of more prestigious/"standard" forms. Nevertheless, the dialect groups broadly correspond with modern ones.

Westphalian (HG: Westfälisch, Dutch: Westfaals): Broadly speaking, the area between the middle Weser and lower Rhine. Main cities: Münster, Paderborn, Dortmund, Bielefeld, Osnabrück. Some Saxon dialects in the modern Netherlands (esp. modern Gelderland and Overijssel) belonged to this group. Dutch influence on them strongly increased since the 15th century.

Some features: In the West, strong influence from Low Franconian orthographic patterns (e.g. e or i as a sign of length, like oi = /oː/). The "breaking" of old short vowels in open syllables and before /r/ was often marked in writing (e.g. karn instead of korn). Old geminated /jj/ and sometimes /ww/ was hardened into [ɡ]; /ft/ frequently shifted to /xt/ (sometimes reversed in writing); /s/ instead of /ʃ/ (sal vs schal). The native present plural verbs was -et but the written norm often impressed -en. Similarly, the participle prefix ge- was usually written, though probably only spoken in the Southwest. Lexically, strong connections with adjacent dialects further north (East Frisian and Oldenburgish), e.g. godensdach ('Wednesday') instead of middeweke. Westphalian was and is often thought to be altogether the most conservative dialect group.

North Low Saxon (HG: Nordniedersächsisch, Dutch: Noord-Nedersaksisch): Spoken in a long stretch of coastal regions from the Zuiderzee in the West to East Prussia in the East. Its orthographic habits come closest to what was traditionally perceived as a MLG standard (the Lübeck standard, nowadays disputed).

Some features: Short /e/ and /i/ in open syllables are stretched into a [ɛː]-like vowel. The personal suffixes -er and -ald appear as -ar and -old. The pronouns mî (1.sg.), dî (2.sg.) and jû (2.pl.) are used for both dative and accusative.

Three subgroups can be distinguished:

(1) East Frisian and Oldenburgish, i.e. the areas west of the lower Weser, in the North including dialects on Frisian substrate. As can be expected, there is much Westphalian, Dutch and Frisian influence (hem next to em 'him'; plurals in -s; vrent next to vrünt 'friend').

(2) Nordalbingian, between the lower Weser and the lower Elbe, and also Holstein on the right bank of the lower Elbe. main towns: Hamburg, Bremen, Lunenburg, Kiel.

(3) East Elbian, including Lübeck and the areas further east, like Mecklenburg, Pomerania, northern Brandenburg (Prignitz, Uckermark, Altmark), Old Prussia, Livonia. Very close to Nordalbingian. While the Eastern dialects are today clearly distinguished from the West by their uniform present plural verb ending in -en (against Western uniform -(e)t), in MLG times, both endings competed against each other in West and East. Main towns: Lübeck, Wismar, Rostock, Stralsund. High German influence was strong in the Teutonic Order, due to the diverse regional origins of its chivalric elite, therefore MLG written culture was neglected early on.

Eastphalian (HG: Ostfälisch): Roughly the area east of the middle Weser, north and partly west of the Harz mountains, reaching the middle Elbe, but leaving out the Altmark region. In the north, the sparsely populated Lunenburg Heath forms something of a natural border. Main cities: Hanover, Hildesheim, Brunswick, Goslar, Göttingen, Magdeburg, Halle (early times). The area within the Elbe's drainage was established by colonisation and is in many ways special. The southern part of this Elbe Eastphalian (HG: Elbostfälisch) area switched to High German already in Late Medieval times.

Some features: Umlaut is more productive, occurring before -ich and -isch (e.g. sessisch 'Saxon, Low German') and shifting also e to i (e.g. stidde for stêde 'place'). Diphthongised short /o/ is rarely marked as such, contrary to other dialects. Before /r/, e and a are frequently interchanged for each other. Unstressed o (as in the suffix -schop) frequently changes into u (-schup). The modal verb for 'shall/should' features /ʃ/, not /s/ (i.e. schal). The past participle's prefix was commonly spoken e- but mostly written ge- under prescriptive influence. The local form ek ('I' (pron. 1.sg.)) competed with "standard" ik; in a similar way the oblique form mik ('me') with "standard" mî. Unusually, there is also a dative pronoun (1.sg. mê). Lexically, close connections with Nordalbingian. Unusual plural menne ('men').

(South) Brandenburgish (HG: (Süd-)Brandenburgisch) and East Anhaltish (HG: Ostanhaltisch): Roughly between the middle Elbe and the middle Oder, and along the middle Havel, bordering old Sorbian territory to the Southeast. Main cities: Berlin, Frankfurt/Oder, Zerbst. A colonial dialect strongly influenced by settlers speaking Low Franconian. Also strongly influenced by High German early on.

Some features: Old long ê and ô were diphthongised into [iə] and [uə], written i and u. Old Germanic coda /n/ is restored, contrary to Ingvaeonic sound changes, e.g. gans 'goose'. Present plural of verbs features the suffix -en. Lack of negative determiner nên ('no' (attr.)), instead: keyn, similar to High German. The past participle retains the prefix ge-. Lack of gaderen ('to gather') and tőgen ('to show'); instead of them, forms close to High German, i.e. samenen and teigen. In East Anhaltish, distinction of dative and accusative pronouns (e.g. mi vs mik, cf. HG mir and mich).

== Literature ==
- Bible translations into German
- The Sachsenspiegel
- Reynke de Vos, a version of Reynard
- Low German Incunable prints in Low German as catalogued in the Gesamtkatalog der Wiegendrucke, including the Low German Ship of Fools, Danse Macabre, and the novel Paris und Vienne
