= Old Saxon =

Germanic language spoken from the 8th to 12th centuries

- Old Low German
- Sahsisk
- Region: Northwest Germany, Northeast Netherlands, Southern Denmark (North Schleswig)
- Ethnicity: Saxons
- Era: 8th–12th centuries; mostly developed into Middle Low German at the end of the 12th century
- Language family: Indo-European: Germanic; West Germanic; North Sea Germanic; Old Saxon
- Writing system: Latin

Language codes
- ISO 639-3: osx
- Glottolog: olds1250
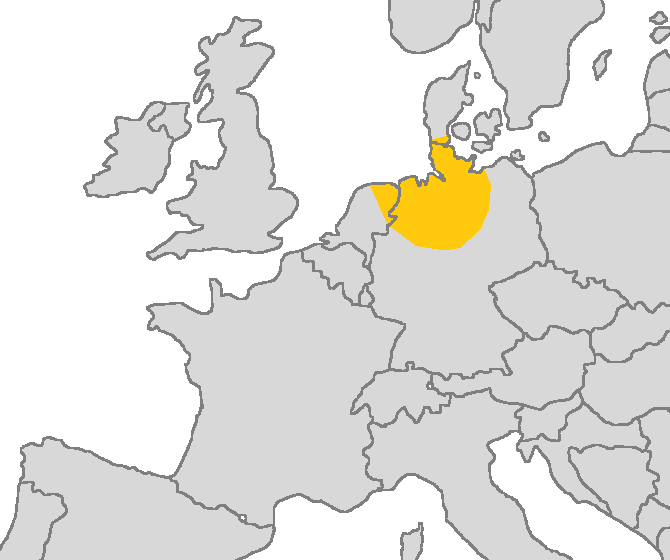
- Area in which Old Saxon was spoken in yellow

Old Saxon (Low German: Ooldsass'sche Spraak), also known as Old Low German (Low German: Ooldneddersche Spraak), was a Germanic language and the earliest recorded form of Low German (spoken nowadays in Northern Germany, the northeastern Netherlands, southern Denmark, the Americas and parts of Eastern Europe). It is a West Germanic language, closely related to the Anglo-Frisian languages. It is documented from the 8th century until the 12th century, when it gradually evolved into Middle Low German. It was spoken throughout modern northwestern Germany, primarily in the coastal regions and in the eastern Netherlands by Saxons, a Germanic tribe that inhabited the region of Saxony. It partially shares the Ingvaeonic nasal spirant law with Anglo-Frisian (Old Frisian, Old English) languages, which sets it apart from Low Franconian and Irminonic languages, such as Dutch, Luxembourgish and German.

The grammar of Old Saxon was fully inflected with five grammatical cases (nominative, accusative, genitive, dative, and instrumental), three grammatical numbers (singular, plural, and dual), and three grammatical genders (masculine, feminine, and neuter). The dual forms occurred in the first and second persons only.

== Characteristics ==
=== Relation with other West Germanic languages ===
In the early Middle Ages, a dialect continuum existed between Old Dutch and Old Saxon, a continuum which has since been interrupted by the simultaneous dissemination of standard languages within each nation and the dissolution of folk dialects. Although they share some features, a number of differences separate Old Saxon, Old English, and Old Dutch. One such difference is the Old Dutch utilization of -a as its plural a-stem noun ending, while Old Saxon and Old English employ -as or -os. However, it seems that Middle Dutch took the Old Saxon a-stem ending from some Middle Low German dialects, as modern Dutch includes the plural ending -s added to certain words. Another difference is the so-called "unified plural": Old Saxon, like Old Frisian and Old English, has one verb form for all three persons in the plural, whereas Old Dutch retained three distinct forms (reduced to two in Middle Dutch).

Old Saxon (or Old Low German) probably evolved primarily from Ingvaeonic dialects in the West Germanic branch of Proto-Germanic in the 5th century. However, Old Saxon, even considered as an Ingvaeonic language, is not a pure Ingvaeonic dialect like Old Frisian and Old English, the latter two sharing some other Ingvaeonic characteristics, which Old Saxon lacked.

=== Relation to Middle Low German ===
Old Saxon naturally evolved into Middle Low German over the course of the 11th and 12th centuries, with a great shift from Latin to Low German writing happening around 1150, so that the development of the language can be traced from that period.

The most striking difference between Middle Low German and Old Saxon is in a feature of speech known as vowel reduction, which took place in most other West Germanic languages and some Scandinavian dialects such as Danish, reducing all unstressed vowels to schwa. Thus, such Old Saxon words like gisprekan ('spoken') or dagō ('days'' – gen. pl.) became gesprēken and dāge.

== Phonology ==
=== Early developments ===
Old Saxon did not participate in the High German consonant shift, and thus preserves stop consonants p, t, k that have been shifted in Old High German to various fricatives and affricates. The Germanic diphthongs ai, au consistently develop into long vowels ē, ō, whereas in Old High German they appear either as ei, ou or ē, ō depending on the following consonant.

Old Saxon, alone of the West Germanic languages except for Frisian, consistently preserves Germanic /j/ after a consonant, e.g. hēliand 'saviour' (Old High German: heilant, Old English: hǣlend, but Gothic: háiljands). Germanic umlaut, when it occurs with short a, is inconsistent, e.g. hebbean or habbian "to have" (Old English: habban). This feature was carried over into the descendant-language of Old Saxon, Middle Low German, where e.g. the adjective krank ('sick, ill') had the comparative forms krenker and kranker. Apart from the e, however, the umlaut is not marked in writing.

=== Consonants ===
The table below lists the consonants of Old Saxon. Phonemes written in parentheses represent allophones and are not independent phonemes.

Old Saxon consonant phonemes
		Labial	Dental	Alveolar	Palatal	Velar	Glottal
Nasal		m	n				
Plosive	voiceless	p	t			k	
Plosive	voiced	b	d				
Fricative		f (v)	θ (ð)	s̺ (z̺)		ɣ (x)	h
Approximant			l		j	w	
Trill			r				

Notes:

- The voiceless spirants /f/, /θ/, and /s/ gain voiced allophones ([v], [ð], and [z]) when between vowels. This change is only faithfully reflected in writing for [v] (represented with letters such as ⟨ƀ⟩ and ⟨u⟩). The other two allophones continued to be written as before.
- Fricatives were devoiced again word-finally. Beginning in the later Old Saxon period, stops became devoiced word-finally as well.
- Most consonants could be geminated. Notably, geminated /v/ gave /bː/, and geminated /ɣ/ probably gave /ɡː/; Geminated /h/ resulted in /xː/.
- Germanic *h is retained as [x] in these positions and thus merges with devoiced /ɣ/.

=== Vowels ===
Old Saxon monophthongs
	Front				Back	
	short	long	short	long	short	long
Close	ɪ	iː	(ʏ)	(yː)	ʊ	uː
Close-mid	(e)	eː		(øː)		oː
Open-mid	ɛ	ɛː	(œ)	(œː)	ɔ	ɔː
Open	(æ)	(æː)			ɑ	ɑː

Notes:

- Long vowels were rare in unstressed syllables and mostly occurred due to suffixation or compounding.

=== Diphthongs ===
Old Saxon diphthongs
	Front	Back
Opening	io (ia ie)	(uo)
Height-harmonic	iu	
Closing	aːi ɛi ɛu	ɑu ɔːi oːi

Notes:

- The closing diphthongs /ei/ and /ou/ sometimes occur in texts (especially in Genesis), probably under the influence of Franconian or High German dialects, where they replace Old Saxon developments /ɛː/ and /ɔː/ (which evolved from Proto-Germanic /ai/ and /au/).
- The situation for the front opening diphthongs is somewhat unclear in some texts. Words written with ⟨io⟩ in the Heliand, the most extensive record of Old Saxon writing, are often found written variably with ⟨ia⟩ or even ⟨ie⟩ in most other texts, notably the later ones. The diphthong eventually merges into /eː/ in almost every Middle Low German dialect except southeastern Eastphalian.
- There also existed 'long' diphthongs /oːu/, /aːu/ and /eːu/. These were, however, treated as two-syllable sequences of a long vowel followed by a short one, not proper diphthongs.

== Grammar ==
=== Morphology ===
Unlike modern English, Old Saxon was an inflected language rich in morphological diversity. It kept five out of the six distinct cases of Proto-Germanic: the nominative, accusative, genitive, dative and (vestigially in the oldest texts) instrumental.

Old Saxon also had three grammatical numbers (singular, and dual, and plural) and three grammatical genders (masculine, feminine, and neuter). The dual forms occurred in the first and second persons only and referred to groups of exactly two.

=== Nouns ===
Old Saxon nouns were inflected in very different ways following their classes. Here are the endings for dag, 'day' an a-stem masculine noun:

dag 'day' m.
Case	Singular	Plural
Nominative, Accusative	dag	dagos
Genitive	dages, -as	dago
Dative	dage, -a	dagum, -un

At the end of the Old Saxon period, distinctions between noun classes began to disappear, and endings from one were often transferred to the other declension, and vice versa. This happened to be a large process, and the most common noun classes started to cause the least represented to disappear. As a result, in Middle Low German, only the former weak n-stem and strong a-stem classes remained. These two noun inflection classes started being added to words not only following the historical belonging of this word, but also following the root of the word.

=== Verbs ===
The Old Saxon verb inflection system reflects an intermediate stage between Old English and Old Dutch, and further Old High German. Unlike Old High German and Old Dutch, but similarly to Old English, it did not preserve the three different verb endings in the plural, all featured as -ad (also -iad or -iod following the different verb inflection classes). Like Old Dutch, it had only two classes of weak verb, with only a few relic verbs of the third weak class (namely four verbs: libbian, seggian, huggian and hebbian).

This table sums up all seven Old Saxon strong verb classes and the three weak verb classes:

		Strong verbs							Weak verbs
Conjugation	Pronoun	'to ride'	'to fly'	'to help'	'to break'	'to speak'	'to travel'	'to wield'	'to deem'	'to declare'	'to say'
Infinitive		rīdan	fliogan	helpan	brekan	sprekan	faran	waldan	dōmian	mahlon	seggian
Present indicative
Present indicative	ik	rīdu	fliugu	hilpu	briku	spriku	faru	waldu	dōmiu	mahlo(n)	seggiu
Present indicative	thū	rīdis	fliugis	hilpis	brikis	sprikis	feris	weldis	dōmis	mahlos	sages
Present indicative	hē/it/siu	rīdid	fliugid	hilpid	brikid	sprikid	ferid	weldid	dōmid	mahlod	saged
Present indicative	wī/gī/sia	rīdad	fliogad	helpad	brekad	sprekad	farad	waldad	dōmiad	mahliod	seggiad
Past indicative
Past indicative	ik	rēd	flōg	halp	brak	sprak	fōr	wēld	dōmda	mahloda	sagda
Past indicative	thū	ridi	flugi	hulpi	brāki	sprāki	fōri	wēldi	dōmdes	mahlodes	sagdes
Past indicative	hē/it/siu	rēd	flōg	halp	brak	sprak	fōr	wēld	dōmda	mahloda	sagda
Past indicative	wī/gī/sia	ridun	flugun	hulpun	brākun	sprākun	fōrun	wēldun	dōmdun	mahlodun	sagdun
Present subjunctive
Present subjunctive	ik	rīde	flioge	helpe	breke	spreke	fare	walde	dōmie	mahlo	seggie
Present subjunctive	thū	rīdes	flioges	helpes	brekes	sprekes	fares	waldes	dōmies	mahlos	seggies
Present subjunctive	hē/it/siu	rīde	flioge	helpe	breke	spreke	fare	walde	dōmie	mahlo	seggie
Present subjunctive	wī/gī/sia	rīden	fliogen	helpen	breken	spreken	faren	walden	dōmien	mahlion	seggien
Past subjunctive
Past subjunctive	ik	ridi	flugi	hulpi	brāki	sprāki	fōri	wēldi	dōmdi	mahlodi	sagdi
Past subjunctive	thū	ridis	flugis	hulpis	brākis	sprākis	fōris	wēldis	dōmdis	mahlodis	sagdis
Past subjunctive	hē/it/siu	ridi	flugi	hulpi	brāki	sprāki	fōri	wēldi	dōmdi	mahlodi	sagdi
Past subjunctive	wī/gī/sia	ridin	flugin	hulpin	brākin	sprākin	fōrin	wēldin	dōmdin	mahlodin	sagdin
Imperative	Singular	rīd	fliog	help	brek	sprek	far	wald	dōmi	mahlo	sage
Imperative	Plural	rīdad	fliogad	helpad	brekad	sprekad	farad	waldad	dōmiad	mahliod	seggiad
Present participle		rīdandi	fliogandi	helpandi	brekandi	sprekandi	farandi	waldandi	dōmiandi	mahlondi	seggiandi
Past participle		(gi)ridan	(gi)flogan	(gi)holpan	(gi)brokan	(gi)sprekan	(gi)faran	(gi)waldan	(gi)dōmid	(gi)mahlod	(gi)sagd

It should be noticed that the third weak verb class includes only four verbs (namely libbian, seggian, huggian and hebbian); it is a remnant of an older and larger class that was kept in Old High German.

=== Syntax ===
Old Saxon syntax is mostly different from that of modern English. Some were simply consequences of the greater level of nominal and verbal inflection – e.g., word order was generally freer. In addition:

- The default word order was verb-second, very close to that of modern Dutch or modern German.
- There was no do-support in questions and negatives.
- Multiple negatives could stack up in a sentence and intensify each other (negative concord), which is not always the case in modern English, modern Dutch, or modern German.
- Sentences with subordinate clauses of the type "when X, Y" (e.g. "When I got home, I ate dinner.") did not use a wh-type conjunction, but rather used a th-type correlative conjunction (e.g. thô X, thô Y in place of "when X, Y"). The wh-type conjunctions were used only as interrogative pronouns and indefinite pronouns.
- Similarly, wh- forms were not used as relative pronouns (as in "the man who saw me" or "the car which I bought"). Instead, an indeclinable word the was used, often in conjunction with the definite article (which was declined for case, number and gender).

== Orthography ==
Old Saxon comes down in a number of different manuscripts whose spelling systems sometimes differ markedly. In this section, only the letters used in normalized versions of the Heliand will be kept, and the sounds modern scholars have traditionally assigned to these letters. Where spelling deviations in other texts may point to significant pronunciation variants, this will be indicated.

In general, the spelling of Old Saxon corresponds quite well to that of the other ancient Germanic languages, such as Old High German or Gothic.

- ⟨c⟩ and ⟨k⟩ were both used for [k]. However, it seems that, as in other West-Germanic dialects, when [k] was followed by ⟨i⟩ or ⟨e⟩, it had the pronunciation /ts/ or /kʲsʲ/. The letters ⟨c⟩ and ⟨x⟩ were preferred for the palatalisations, ⟨k⟩ and even sometimes ⟨ch⟩ being rather used before ⟨u⟩, ⟨o⟩ or ⟨a⟩ for /k/ (kuning for [kʏnɪŋk] 'king', modern köning; crûci for [kryːtsi] ; forsachistu for [forsakistuː]).
- ⟨g⟩ represented [ɣ] or its allophone [ɡ]: brengian [brɛŋɡjan] 'to bring', seggian [sɛɡɡjan] 'to say', wege [wɛɣe] 'way' (dative).
- ⟨g⟩ seems, at least in a few dialects, to have had the pronunciation [j] or [ʝ] at the beginning of a word, only when followed by ⟨i⟩ or ⟨e⟩. Thus we find giār [jaːr] 'year' and even gēr [jeːr] 'year', the latter betraying a strong Old Frisian influence.
- ⟨h⟩ represents [h] and its allophone [x]: holt [hɔlt] 'wood', naht [naxt] 'night' (mod. nacht).
- ⟨i⟩ is used for both the vowels [ɪ] and [iː] and the consonant [j]: ik [ɪk] 'I' (mod. ich, ik), iār [jaːr] 'year'.
- ⟨qu⟩ and ⟨kw⟩ always represent [kw]: quāmun [kwaːmʊn] 'they came'.
- ⟨s⟩ represented [s], and between two vowels also [z].
- ⟨th⟩ is used to indicate [θ]: thōhtun [θoːxtun] 'they thought'. ⟨ð⟩ is used for [ð], occasionally also written ⟨dh⟩.
- ⟨u⟩ represented the vowels [ʊ] and [uː], or the consonant [β] ~ [v], which was denoted sporadically across manuscripts by either ⟨ƀ⟩, ⟨b⟩, ⟨u⟩, ⟨v⟩, or ⟨f⟩'.
- ⟨uu⟩ was normally used to represent [w], predating the letter ⟨w⟩.
- ⟨z⟩ only appeared in a few texts due to Old High German influence.

== Literature ==
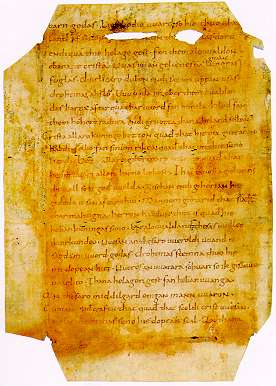
Heliand excerpt from the German Historical Museum in Berlin

Only a few texts survive, predominantly baptismal vows the Saxons were required to perform at the behest of Charlemagne. The only literary texts preserved are Heliand and fragments of the Old Saxon Genesis. There is also:

- Beda homily (Homilie Bedas)
- Credo (Abrenunciatio diaboli et credo) → Old Saxon baptismal vow.
- Essener Heberegister
- Old Saxon Baptismal Vow (German: Sächsisches Taufgelöbnis)
- Penitentiary (altsächsische Beichte, altwestfälische Beichte)
- Trierer Blutsegen ( de.)
- Spurihalz (Wiener Pferdsegen) ( de.)
- Wurmsegen (Wiener Wurmsegen) ( de).
- Psalms commentary (Gernroder Psalmenkommentar)

== Sample text ==
A poetic version of the Lord's Prayer in the form of the traditional Germanic alliterative verse is given in Old Saxon below as it appears in the Heliand.

Line	Original	Modern Low German	Translation
[1600]	Fadar usa // firiho barno,	Vadder van us, de Söhn/ Kinner van de Minschen,	Father our [our Father/Father of us], men's sons [the sons of men],
[1601]	thu bist an them hohon // himila rikea,	Du bist an den hogen himmlischen Riek,	Thou art [You are] in the high heavenly domain [kingdom of the heavens],
[1602]	geuuihid si thin namo // uuordo gehuuilico,	Hiligt wees/sie dien naam in elk Woord,	Hallowed be Thy [Your] name (with) every word,
[1603]	Cuma thin // craftag riki.	Kaam dien mächtig Riek.	May Thy [Your] mighty domain [kingdom] come.
[1604]	UUerða thin uuilleo // oƀar thesa werold alla,	Warr dien Wille över düsse Werld allerwegens,	Worth [May] Thy [Your] will (be done) over all this world,
[1605]	so sama an erðo, // so thar uppa ist	so up de Eerd, as dat it is dor baven	Just the same on earth, as (it) is up there
[1606]	an them hohon // himilo rikea.	in den hogen himmlischen riek	in the high heavenly domain [kingdom of the heavens].
[1607]	Gef us dag gehuuilikes rad, // drohtin the godo,	Giff us elk Dag Raad, Herr de Gode,	Give us every day rede [advice/counsel], (oh) Drighten [Lord] the Good,
[1608]	thina helaga helpa, // endi alat us, heƀenes uuard,	Dine hilige Hölp, un laat us free, Beschermer van de Heven,	(and) Thy [Your] holy help, and deliver [set free/absolve] us, (oh) Heaven's Ward [Lord/Ruler of Heaven],
[1609]	managoro mensculdio, // al so uue oðrum mannum doan.	(van) is männje Schullen	(of our) many crimes, just as we (shall) do (to) other men [people].
[1610]	Ne lat us farledean // leða uuihti	Laat lege/böse Wichten nich us verschünnen	Do not let loath(some) wights forlead [mislead, seduce] us
[1611]	so forð an iro uuilleon, // so uui uuirðige sind,	jümehr Willen to doon, as wi würdig sind,	so forth in [to go on with] their will as we are worthy,
[1612]	ac help us uuiðar allun // uƀilon dadiun.	man hölp us (fechten/twingen?) tegen alle öveln/bösen Daden/Begeevnissen.	but (rather) help us wither [against] all evil deeds.

== See also ==
- Old Saxon Genesis
- Old Saxon Baptismal Vow
- Heliand
- Middle Low German
- Low German
- Ingvaeonic nasal spirant law

== Bibliography ==
=== Sources ===
- "Old Saxon language". Encyclopaedia Britannica. 2024.
- Gallée, Johan Hendrik (1910). Altsächsische Grammatik (in German) (2nd ed.). Halle (Saale): Max Niemeyer Verlag. LCCN 12005859. OCLC 3128438. OL 6541088M. Wikidata Q131582014.
- Lasch, Agathe (1914). Mittelniederdeutsche Grammatik (in German). Halle (Saale): Max Niemeyer Verlag. ASIN B00416B8PU. LCCN 15008211. OCLC 3145389. OL 6575768M. Wikidata Q131355367.

=== General ===
- Euler, Wolfram (2013). Das Westgermanische – von der Herausbildung im 3. bis zur Aufgliederung im 7. Jahrhundert – Analyse und Rekonstruktion (West Germanic – from its Emergence in the 3rd up until its Dissolution in the 7th Century CE – Analyses and Reconstruction). 244 p., in German with English summary, London/Berlin 2013, ISBN 978-3-9812110-7-8.
- Rauch, Irmengard (1992). The Old Saxon Language. New York: Peter Lang Publishing. ISBN 0820418935. LCCN 92020320. OCLC 26052698. OL 1717740M.
- Ringe, Donald R. and Taylor, Ann (2014). The Development of Old English – A Linguistic History of English, vol. II, 632p. ISBN 978-0199207848. Oxford.
- Holthausen, Ferdinand (1923). Altsächsisches Elementarbuch. Ulan Press.

=== Lexicons ===
- Tiefenbach, Heinrich (2010). Altsächsisches Handwörterbuch / A Concise Old Saxon Dictionary. De Gruyter.
- Köbler, Gerhard (2014). Altsächsisches Wörterbuch [Old Saxon Dictionary] (in German) (5th ed.). Gerhard Köbler. Wikidata Q131593991.

=== External history ===
- Ammon, Hermann (1922). Repetitorium der deutschen Sprache. Gotisch, Althochdeutsch, Altsächsisch. Berlin: Walter de Gruÿter. doi:10.1515/9783112431849. ISBN 9783112431832.
- Helfenstein, Jacob (1870). Comparative Grammar of the Teutonic languages. London: Macmillan. OCLC 456068779. OL 7706011W.
- Meidinger, Heinrich (1923). Vergleichendes Etymologisches Wörterbuch Der Gothisch-Teutonischen Mundarten. Ulan Press.
- Robinson, Orrin W. (1992). Old English and its closest relatives. Stanford: Stanford University Press. ISBN 0804714541. LCCN 90024700. OCLC 1150958619. OL 1866584M.
- Schade, Oskar (1923). Altdeutsches Lesebuch. Ulan Press.
