= Wilhelm Braune =

German philologist (1850–1926)

Theodor Wilhelm Braune (20 February 1850 in Großthiemig, Province of Saxony – 10 November 1926 in Heidelberg) was a German philologist and Germanist.

== Biography ==
In 1869 Braune entered the University of Leipzig, where he was approved as an instructor in 1874. In 1877 he was appointed as extraordinary professor at the University of Giessen and became an ordinary professor of German language and literature there in 1880. He later served as a professor at the University of Heidelberg. He is an important representative of the Neogrammarians.

Among his most lasting achievements were his works on the history of the Germanic languages. Editions of his grammars and anthologies of Old High German and Gothic are still in use today. In 1873 he also founded, together with Hermann Paul, the Germanic studies journal Beiträge zur Geschichte der deutschen Sprache und Literatur often referred to among scholars as Pauls und Braunes Beiträge (or PBB) and which remains one of the leading journals in Germanic philology to this day.

He was the recipient of a Festschrift on the occasion of his 70th birthday, entitled Aufsätze zur Sprach- und Literaturgeschichte. Wilhelm Braune zum 20. Februar 1920 dargebracht von Freunden und Schülern (Dortmund: Ruhfus, 1920).

== Publications ==
- Althochdeutsches Lesebuch (“Old High German reader”), compiled and provided with a dictionary by Wilhelm Braune (Halle: Niemeyer, 1875; 5th ed., 1902 (google-US); 6th ed., 1907 (google-US); 17th ed. by Ernst Ebbinghaus, Tübingen: Niemeyer, 1994).
- Althochdeutsche Grammatik. Laut- und Formenlehre, von Wilhelm Braune. Halle: Niemeyer, 1886. 15th ed. by Ingo Reiffenstein. Tübingen: Niemeyer, 2004.
- Gotische Grammatik mit Lesestücken und Wörterverzeichnis von Wilhelm Braune. Halle: Niemeyer, 1880. 18th ed. by Ernst Ebbinghaus. Tübingen: Niemeyer, 1973.
