= West-Veluws dialect =

Dialect of Veluws

West-Veluws
- North Veluws
- Native to: Netherlands
- Region: Gelderland
- Language family: Indo-European: Germanic; West Germanic; North Sea Germanic; Low Franconian / Low German, more specifically Dutch Low Saxon; Veluws; West-Veluws

Language codes
- ISO 639-3: –
- Glottolog: nort2630
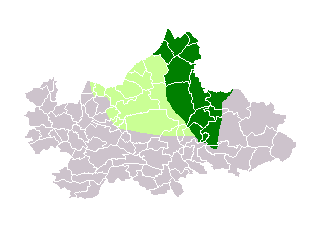
- Map of the dialects of Veluws, including West-Veluws (light green)

West-Veluws is a Low Franconian dialect of the Dutch province of Gelderland. It is spoken in several Veluwe municipalities and villages including: Nunspeet, Putten, Ermelo (Armelo), Harderwijk (Harderwiek), Uddel, Nijkerk (Niekark), Appel, Scherpenzeel (Schaarpezeel), the municipality of Barneveld (Barreveld) and some villages of the municipality of Ede.

West-Veluws is also spoken in the Utrecht village of Bunschoten (Bunsjoten) and originally in Leusden and Amersfoort as well, but here the dialect has almost died out. The border between West-Veluwe in the northeast and Utrecht and South Gelderland in the southwest is very frayed: even the dialects of, for instance, Soest, Eemnes, Huizen and Laren still have Lowlands Saxon characteristics. In the articles Goois, Eemlands and Geldersevalleis these transitional dialects are discussed in more detail.

== Speakers ==
West-Veluws is mainly spoken by older people, the Low Saxon dialect is not very popular among the youth. This is true, incidentally, of many other areas in the Netherlands where dialects are largely being exchanged for Standard Dutch. The majority of the Veluwe youth today speak Standard Dutch, but there are still young people who speak the dialect from home, but often with more of a Dutch influence than their parents and grandparents. There is also a small number of second language speakers. In general, West-Veluws is fairly easy to understand for people whose mother tongue is Standard Dutch; the further north or east one goes, the more difficult it becomes for a speaker of Standard Dutch. On the whole, within the West-Veluwe language area, more dialect is spoken in the northern places than in the southern ones.

After the Second World War, Nijkerk developed into a commuter town for Amersfoort, an almost dialect-free city, so that the dialect-speaking community is strongly outnumbered. In fact, this situation applies to the entire border region of Utrecht and Gelderland, except for Bunschoten-Spakenburg. Places like Elburg and Oldebroek, on the other hand, lie deeper in the Lower Saxon language area, adjacent to the Salland and East Veluwe language area, where the dialect has a much larger place.

== Dictionary of the dialects of Gelderland ==
The last part called Veluwe. De wereld. van het Woordenboek van de Gelderse dialecten (WGD) was published on 7 November 2008. This dictionary series includes words from West Veluwe, East Veluwe, Urkers and dialects from surrounding areas. A version for the river area of Gelderland is also available. In October 2005, the first volume Veluwe. Het huis van Harrie Scholtmeijer appeared and in November 2006, the second part Veluwe. De mens uit.

Earlier, registration of local dialects has taken place on a small scale, for example in Putten, Nijkerk, Scherpenzeel, Bunschoten, Nunspeet and a book for the entire North-West Veluwe.

== Spelling ==
Until recently, there was no standardised spelling for the Veluws dialect. However, the IJsselacademie has developed a spelling for the Overijssel and Veluwe dialects that is largely consistent with Standard Dutch and the other Low Saxon language varieties. Often people still use their own spelling, one of the reasons being that many people are unaware of the existence of the IJsselacademy spelling.

== Features ==
A characteristic of Western Veluws is that it is a kind of transition area between Lowlands Saxon and Standard Dutch; the more northerly a place is situated, the smaller the Standard Dutch influence and the greater the Lower Saxon influence usually becomes. Veluws is usually considered Lower Saxon, since in terms of vocabulary and grammar it is more in line with Lower Saxon than with Standard Dutch, therefore it is originally a real Lower Saxon dialect. West-Veluws has different words and pronunciations per village, so in Nijkerk they say brocht and verlore/veleure, in Putten and Bunschoten brocht and verleuren and in Nunspeet bröch and verleuren (brachten (brought) and verloren (lost) in Standard Dutch).

== Sounds ==
In West-Veluws, the vowel phenomena are strongly influenced by Dutch, more specifically the Hollandic dialects of the seventeenth century. West-Veluws shares this influence with Oost-Veluws, Sallaans, Stellingwarfs and Drèents, where these languages contrast with the more conservative Tweants and Achterhooks. However, the Dutch influence in West-Veluws is more far-reaching. Characteristic of West Veluws is the Dutch ou, which in other dialects is pronounced as ol (e.g. houwen instead of holden); in the border region with Oost-Veluws (e.g. in Nunspeet), these forms are sometimes both used, as well as houwen (to keep/hold), zollen (would). The Dutch ui is almost always pronounced as uu (so muus, huus etc.), however, there are a few exceptions such as: fluit(e), buis(e), spuit(e).

=== Examples ===
West-Veluws	Drèents	Standard Dutch	English
he-j	hej	heb je	have you
houwen	holden	houden	hold
ies	ies	ijs	ice
laand	laand	land	land
oek	ok	ook	also
spoek	spoek	spook	ghost
tied	tied	tijd	time
woenen	wonen	wonen	live
zuunig	zunig	zuinig	frugal

== Dialect comparison ==
Puttens	Nunspeets	Standard Dutch	English
bietje(n)	bietjen	beetje	bit
beteund	betuun	schaars, beperkt	scarce
bonk (Note: Da's een bonk um.)	bonke (Note: Je kunnen m'n een bonke wies maken.)	groot stuk	large part
breekbonen	breekbonen	sperziebonen	green beans
deern, deretje(n)	deerne, deerntjen	meisje	girl
duuf	duve, doeve	duif	dove
eerpel, erepel	eerpel, erepel	aardappel	potato
eerdbees	eerdbeze	aardbei	strawberry
frommes, vrouw, wief	frommes, vrouw, wief	vrouw	woman
frullie	vrouwluui	vrouwen	women
gedien	gedien	gordijn	curtain
glaozekleed	glaozekleed	vitrage	net curtain
hen	hem	hebben	have
kous	hoze, kouse	kous	sock
iezig (Note: Iezig mooi.)	iezig, iezelig	heel, erg	very
keis, kees	keze	kaas	cheese
kiender(s)	kienders	kinderen	children
krang	krang	binnenstebuiten	inside out
kuum	kuum, teumig	bedeesd, rustig	shy, quiet
leed, kwaod, hellig	leed, kwaod, hellig	kwaad, boos	angry, upset
leer	ledder (Elspeet: lere)	ladder	ladder
luui	luui	lui	lazy
platte peters	platte peters	tuinbonen	broad beans
mins	meens	mens	human
mirreg > smirregs/smirreges/smirges	mirreg > snaomes/snaomiddes/smirregs	middag	afternoon
moekerig weer	moekerig weer	broeierig weer	sultry weather
op huus opan	op huus an	naar huis toe	towards home
overstuur	overstuur	bedorven (eten)	spoilt (food)
vao(de)r en moe(de)r (Note: Children's language: poeta and taat.)	vaor en moor	vader en moeder	father and mother
schaal sjaal (Note: Een schaal um de nek.)	sjaal	sjaal, das	scarf, tie
schaol (Note: Steenenkamer et al. 'sjaol'.)	schaole	schaal	scale
schand (Note: Steenenkamer et al. 'sjaand' or 'sjand'.)	schaande	schande	shame
school (Note: Steenenkamer et al. 'sjool'.)	schoele	school	school
sneeg (Note: Sneeg wief = beautiful woman.)	snejig	flink, vlot, gewiekst	brisk, quick, cunning
strabant	strabant	pittig, vrijpostig	feisty, brash
sukelao	sukelao	chocolade	chocolate
de hof, de tuun	de tune, de hof	de tuin	the garden
tunekrupertje, klein jantje(n)	tunekrupertjen	winterkoninkje	wren
uui (also called look something old-fashioned)	ui (also called look something old-fashioned)	ui	onion
vulling	vullen	veulen	foal
wulie	woelie	wij	we
zog	motte	zeug	sow

=== Other dialects ===
Other dialects	Location	Standard Dutch	English
oot(jen)	Bunschoten, Nijkerk, formerly also Putten	oma	grandma
kiekkast(e) (Note: Usually "tv" or "tillevisie".)	entire (West-)Veluwe	televisie	television

Noten

== Grammar ==
In verbs, West-Veluws uses the Dutch suffix -en instead of the original Low Saxon -t, the West-Veluws variant having been blown over from (North) Hollandic with the Hollandic expansion. In Oost-Veluws, for example, one says wie denkt (we think) and wie heurt (we hear), while West-Veluws uses wie/wulie denken and wie/wulie heuren; this phenomenon also occurs in Stellingwarfs. There are also some differences between them, for example Nunspeets has more Oost-Veluws characteristics. For example, 'cheese' in Putten is keis or kees and in Nunspeet keze (or: kêeze) which is the same as in East Veluwe.
