= Low Saxon =

Group of Low German dialects

- Native to: Germany, Netherlands, Southern Denmark
- Speakers: Native: 300,000 (2016); L2: 2.2 million
- Language family: Indo-European: Germanic; West Germanic; North Sea Germanic; Low German; Low Saxon

Language codes
- ISO 639-2: nds for Low German
- ISO 639-3: Variously: nds – (partial) wep – Westphalian frs – Eastern Frisian gos – Gronings stl – Stellingwerfs drt – Drents twd – Twents act – Achterhoeks sdz – Sallands vel – Veluws
- Glottolog: west2357
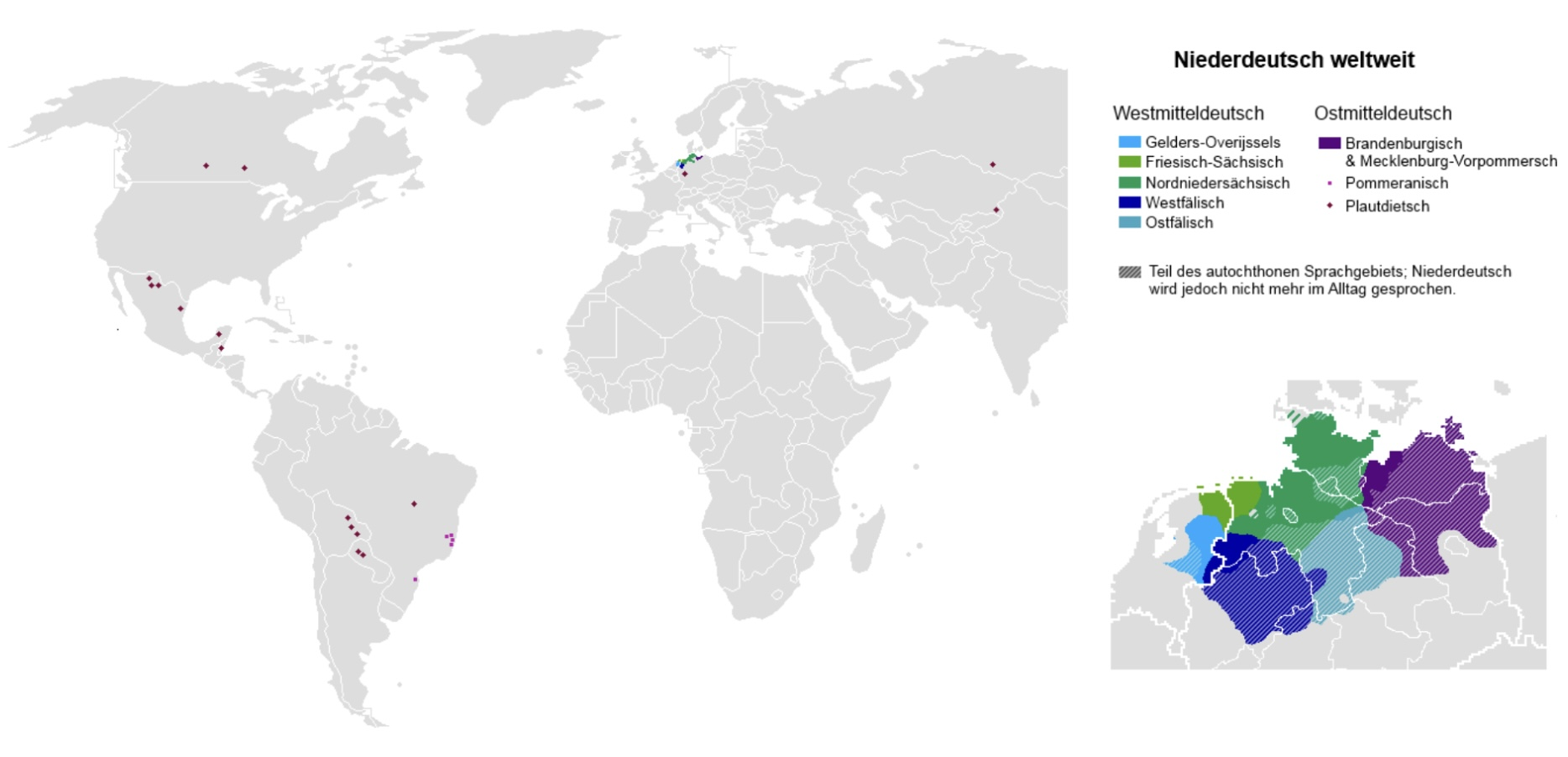
- Low German dialects around the world

Low Saxon (German: Niedersächsisch, Dutch: Nedersaksisch), also known as West Low German (German: Westniederdeutsch), is a group of Low German dialects spoken in parts of the Netherlands, northwestern Germany and southern Denmark (in North Schleswig by parts of the German-speaking minority). It is one of two dialect groups, the other being East Low German.

== Extent ==
The language area comprises the North German states of Lower Saxony, North Rhine-Westphalia (the Westphalian part), Bremen, Hamburg, Schleswig-Holstein and Saxony-Anhalt (the northwestern areas around Magdeburg) as well as the northeast of the Netherlands (i.e. Dutch Low Saxon, spoken in Groningen, Drenthe, Overijssel, northern Gelderland and Urk) and the Schleswigsch dialect spoken by the North Schleswig Germans in the southernmost part of Denmark.

In the south the Benrath line and Uerdingen line isoglosses form the border with the area where West Central German variants of High German are spoken.

== List of dialects ==
=== Germany ===
- Westphalian, including the region around Münster and the Osnabrück region of Lower Saxony
- Eastphalian, spoken in southeastern Lower Saxony (Hanover, Braunschweig, Göttingen) and in the Magdeburg Börde region
- Northern Low Saxon
  - East Frisian Low Saxon in East Frisia
  - Dithmarsisch
  - Schleswig[i]sch
  - Holsteinisch
  - Nordhannoversch
  - Emsländisch
  - Oldenburgisch in the Oldenburg region

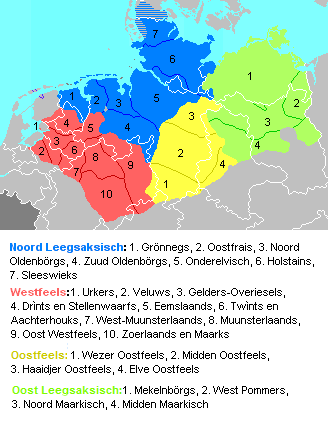
Low Saxon dialects in Europe

=== Netherlands ===
While Dutch is a Low Franconian language, the Dutch Low Saxon varieties form a dialect continuum with Westphalian. They consist of:

- West Low German, divided into:
  - Gronings
  - Drents
  - Stellingwerfs
  - Sallands
  - West-Overijssels
  - Twents
  - Achterhoeks
  - Veluws
  - Urkers

=== Denmark ===
- West Low German
  - Northern Low Saxon
    - Schleswigsch dialect spoken in former South Jutland County (the northern part of the former Duchy of Schleswig) around Aabenraa (Apenrade)

== Situation in the Netherlands ==
A 2005 study found that there were approximately 1.8 million "daily speakers" of Low Saxon in the Netherlands. 53% spoke Low Saxon or Low Saxon and Dutch at home and 71% could speak it. According to another study the percentage of speakers among parents dropped from 34% in 1995 to 15% in 2011. The percentage of speakers among their children dropped from 8% to 2% in the same period.

== Sources ==
- Bloemhoff, Henk (2005). Taaltelling Nedersaksisch. Een enquête naar het gebruik en de beheersing van het Nedersaksisch in Nederland [Lower Saxon Language Census. A survey of the use and proficiency of Low Saxon in the Netherlands] (PDF). Nedersaksisch Instituut (Report) (in Dutch). Groningen: Rijksuniversiteit te Groningen. ISBN 90-6466-1324. LCCN 2006364430. OCLC 230137295. OL 31709135M. Archived from the original (PDF) on 25 November 2024.
