= Oost-Veluws dialect =

Dialect of Veluws

Oost-Veluws
- East Veluws
- Native to: Netherlands
- Region: Gelderland
- Language family: Indo-European: Germanic; West Germanic; North Sea Germanic; Low Franconian / Low German, more specifically Dutch Low Saxon; Veluws; Oost-Veluws

Language codes
- ISO 639-3: –
- Glottolog: east2294
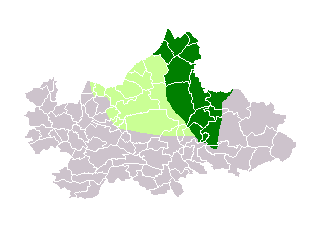
- Map of the dialects of Veluws, including Oost-Veluws (dark green)

Oost-Veluws (also known as East Veluws) is a Low Saxon dialect of the Dutch province of Gelderland. The dialect is endangered as there are few native speakers left.

== Delimitation of Oost-Veluws ==
Oost-Veluws is spoken in places such as the municipalities Elburg en Oldebroek, Epe, Vaassen, Apeldoorn en Dieren. The villages Elspeet, Uddel en Kootwijk in the middle of the Veluwe belong to West-Veluws.

The delimitation to Sallands is problematic to the point that some linguists prefer to make a division between Veluws (consisting of the West, South and Center of Veluwe) and Sallands (consisting of a small part in the North and the East of Veluwe, Salland).

== Differences to other dialect groups ==
=== Differences to West-Veluws ===
Most villages of the area called Veluwe lie on its borders, that is, not in the middle of this sandy woodland. The actual Veluwe is a very sparsely populated area that was rather inaccessible in earlier days. Therefore, it is not surprising that two very important isoglosses have come to lie within the Veluwe.

The first isogloss is the border between old and olt on the Eastern side and the vocalization of l as in oud or out in the West. The retaining of ol is typical for Low German, while its replacement by ou is characteristic for Low Frankish.

The second isogloss pertains to the plural inflection of verbs. In most West Low German dialects, the plural inflection for all person forms is t: wiele warkt, ule warkt, zie warkt - 'we work, you work, they work'. West-Veluws has a unified plural inflection as well, but on -en as in Dutch. But in the South and East of the Veluwe, -t is restricted to the second and third person plural, while the first person takes -en. In the variety of Apeldoorn, for example, it is wiele warken, ule warkt, zie warkt.

There are also some lexical differences. For example, Oost-Veluws has ledder 'ladder', while in West-Veluws the form leer is used which is probably a loan from 17th century Hollandic. This process during which characteristics of Hollandic were adopted in places at the shore of the Zuiderzee, while the IJssel region retained the Low German forms holds also for the two isoglosses cited above.

=== Differences to Achterhoeks ===
But the intensive influence of Hollandic can be observed in Oost-Veluws as well as can be seen when comparing it to Achterhoeks dialect which lies in the East of the Veluwe. E.g. Achterhoeks good, beer, while Dutch and Veluws goed, bier. Germanic long ô as in *grônaz green becomes uu, thus gruun, in comparison to Achterhoeks greun. Here, Oost-Veluws patterns with Sallaans.

Dutch ui usually corresponds to Oost-Veluws uu, while (eastern) Achterhoeks has oe. In all of Sallaans and western Achterhoeks (as in Zutphens), lexical diffusion takes place, and words like huus/huis 'house' and moes/muis 'mouse' can both be heard.
