= 1614 Low German Bible =

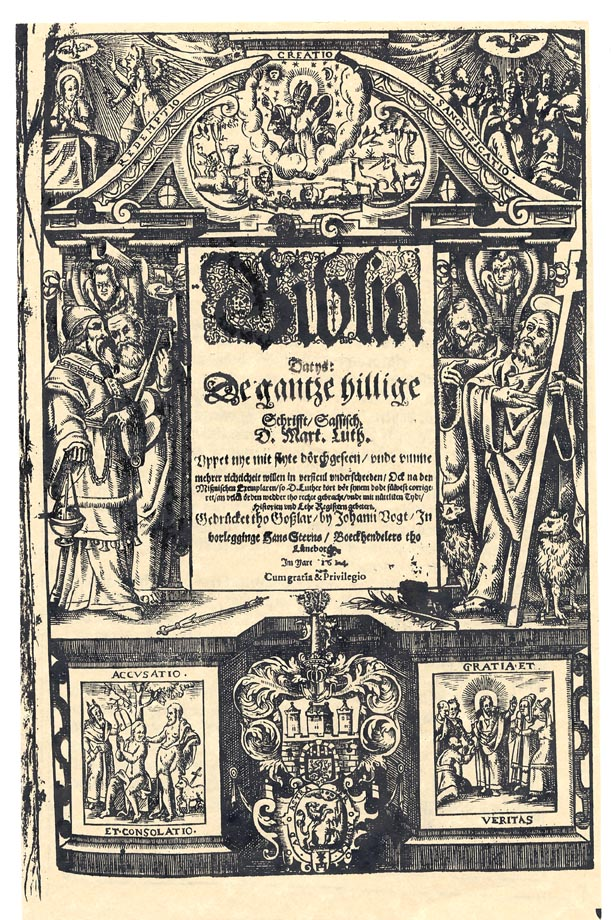
1614 Low German Bible

The 1614 Low German Bible (Note: title: "Biblia Dat ys: De gantze hillige Schrifft, Sassisch D. Mart. Luth. Uppet nye mit flyte dörchgeseen [...]") is a rare, illustrated folio edition in Low German of Martin Luther's High German translation of the Bible. Illustrations in the bible are woodcuts from the Hans Stern publishing family in early Lüneburg, Germany.

== History ==
=== Bible ===
The bible's history was shaped primarily by: Martin Luther (Bible translator), Johannes Bugenhagen (scholar and pastor), Duke Augustus of Saxony, Hans Stern (bookbinder and publisher) and Johann Vogt (Bible printer).

Martin Luther (1483–1546) was the first one to translate the Bible into German from the original languages in which it was written. Before Luther, any German translations of the Bible had been made mainly from Latin. Luther came to believe that salvation came by grace through faith in Christ as taught in the Bible, and he wanted to bring the Bible to the German people. Martin Luther was born in 1483 at Eisleben in Saxony. Luther began working on his translation in 1522 at Eisenach in Saxony. Martin Luther's six-part translation of the Bible was first published in 1534. At this time, Saxony was one of many separate states making up the land of Germany. Variant dialects of two basic languages were spoken in Germany: High German in the highlands to the south and Low German in the lowlands to the north. Luther translated the Bible into a dialect of High German that was spoken in Saxony. As each part of his High German translation was published, a Low German translation was soon prepared and published by his associates, among whom was Johannes Bugenhagen. Martin Luther's last translation of the Bible was made in 1545. The 1614 Low German Bible is a rare, illustrated Luther Bible.

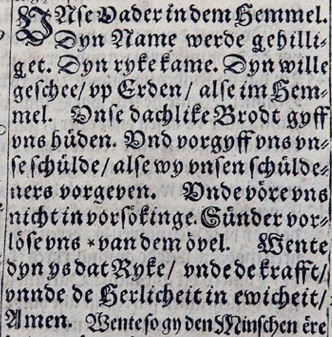
Lord's Prayer in 1614 Bible

Johannes Bugenhagen (1485–1558) was a scholar and was pastor to Martin Luther at St. Mary's church in Wittenberg. Johannes Bugenhagen has also been called second Apostle of the North. Among his major accomplishments was organization of Lutheran churches in north Germany and Scandinavia. Johannes Bugenhagen was one of Martin Luther's associates assisting in Bible translation. Additionally he made a Low German translation of each part of Luther's Bible. Johannes Bugenhagen was always a pastor at heart, and because of his love for music, his seal carries a harp.

The name and coat of arms of Duke Augustus of Saxony (1526–1586) are engraved on the front parchment cover of the 1614 Bible. Augustus came to the throne in Saxony eight years after Luther's last 1545 Bible translation. Soon afterwards this last 1545 Bible translation became authorized as a standard in Saxony. Augustus married Anna, daughter of Christian III, King of Denmark and Norway. This marriage allied Saxony not only to a royal house of Scandinavia, but also to the north state of Schleswig-Holstein which was ruled by Anna's uncle, Adolf (reign 1544–86). The coat of arms of Adolf, Duke of Schleswig-Holstein also appears in the 1614 Bible on the back cover.

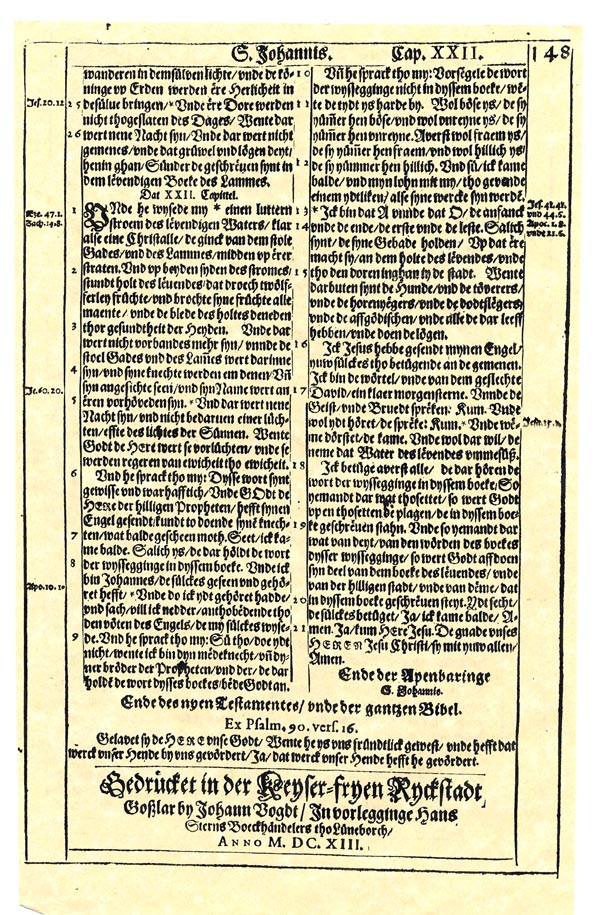
A page in Book of Revelation in 1614 Bible

In the last years of Augustus' life, Hans Stern was a bookbinder in Lüneburg, a city in Lower Saxony where Low German was spoken. Hans Stern became a bookseller, and later, a book publisher. His first book as a publisher was the Low German Bible, with Johann Vogt in Goslar as printer. In his letter of dedication after the title page, Hans Stern wrote that he wanted to print the Low German language in a Bible with "a beautiful clear type, good paper, elegant illustrations, very useful tables, concordances and summaries, and other features put in the finest and most careful order." Hans Stern began printing Low German bibles, but after 1621 he only printed High German bibles, for by that time Low German was disappearing as a written language. Hans Stern's family in Lüneburg today carries the oldest family-owned printing house in the world, and the original woodcut blocks for illustrations in his 1614 Bible have been on display in the Lüneburg Library.

=== Language ===
Low German, also called Low Saxon, is a language that has been spoken mainly in the lowlands (plains and coastal areas) of northern Germany (including Pomerania, West Prussia and East Prussia), northeastern Netherlands and some parts of Denmark. High German has traditionally been a language of the more mountainous areas of Germany south of the Uerdingen line, Switzerland and Austria. Variant dialects are still characteristic to the Low German language. Low German has a history as a language. Many words in Danish, Swedish and Norwegian are also of Low Saxon origin. Low Saxon first appears in writing in the 8th century. It flourished mostly in the 13th, 14th and 15th centuries. After Martin Luther's translation of the Bible in 1534, Low German began disappearing as a written language as High German became more standard in schools. The 1614 Low German Bible has a place in the history of Low German literature.

== Access ==
There are seven known copies of the Bible today. They are displayed in: British Library, Royal Danish Library, Stuttgart Library, Lüneburg Archives, Newberry Library, and Boerne Library.

== See also ==
- Luther Bible
- Low German
- Johannes Bugenhagen

== Literature ==
- Edmonds, Bettie. "The 1614 Low German Bible." Available from Boerne Public Library. Based on research by Marie and Helene Norsieck, Henriette Pierson, and Kenneth Hovey, Associate Professor of English, University of Texas at San Antonio.
