= Drèents dialects =

Westphalian dialects of Drenthe, Netherlands

Drents
- Dreins
- Drèents
- Native to: Netherlands
- Region: Drenthe and a strip of Overijssel just south of Drenthe
- Native speakers: 255,000 (2009)
- Language family: Indo-European: Germanic; West Germanic; North Sea Germanic; Low German; Low Saxon; Westphalian; Drents
- Writing system: Latin

Official status
- Official language in: Netherlands (as part of Low Saxon)
- Regulated by: Provincial States of Drenthe (spelling)

Language codes
- ISO 639-3: drt
- Glottolog: dren1238
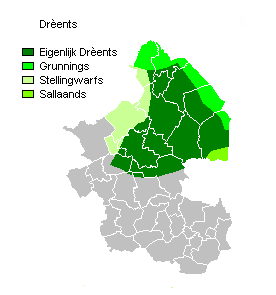
- Map showing the provinces of Drenthe (most of the area in green tones) and Overijssel (mostly grey; with small regions in dark green south of Drenthe)

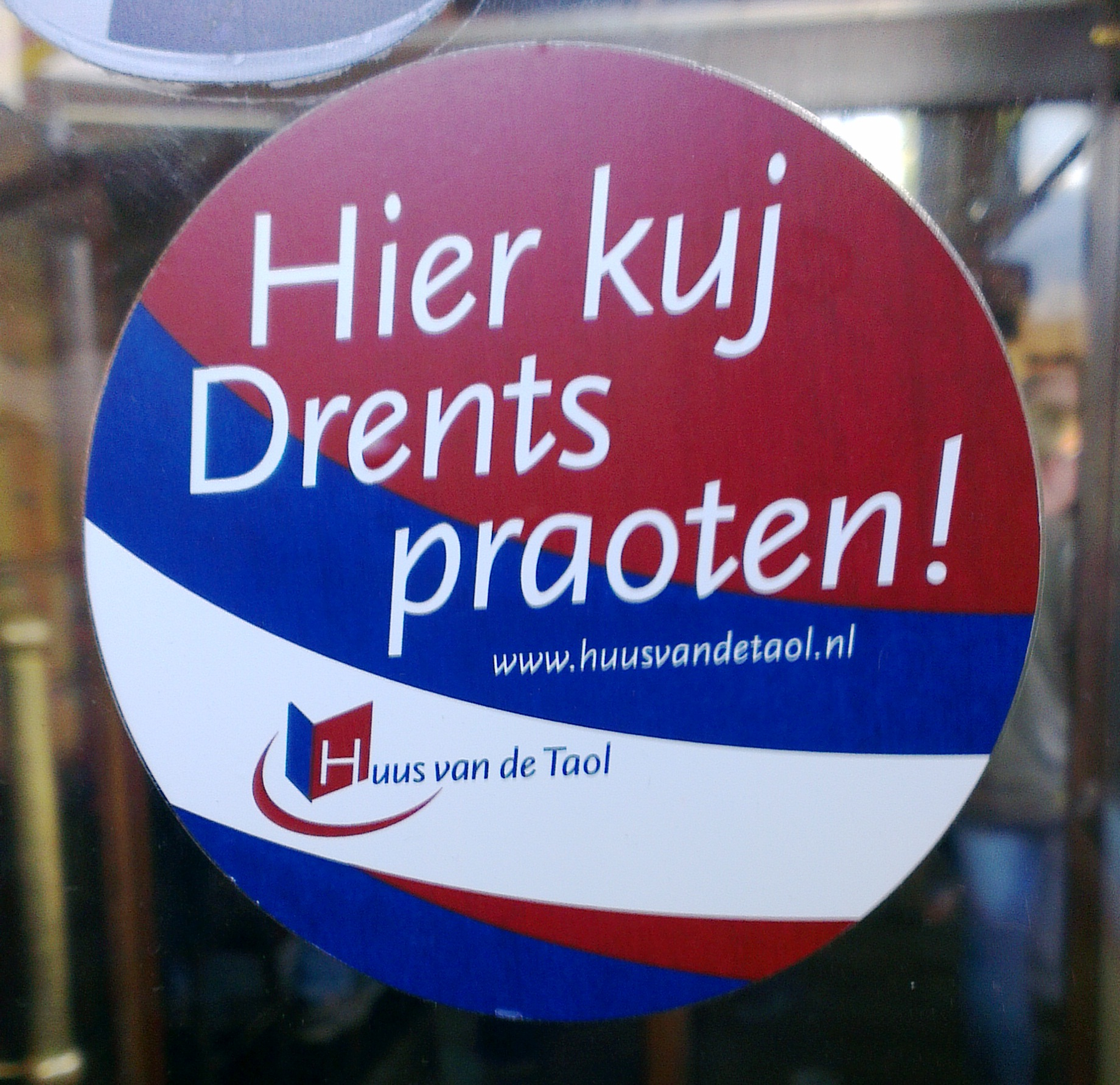
"Here you may speak Drents," sign at a business in Schoonebeek

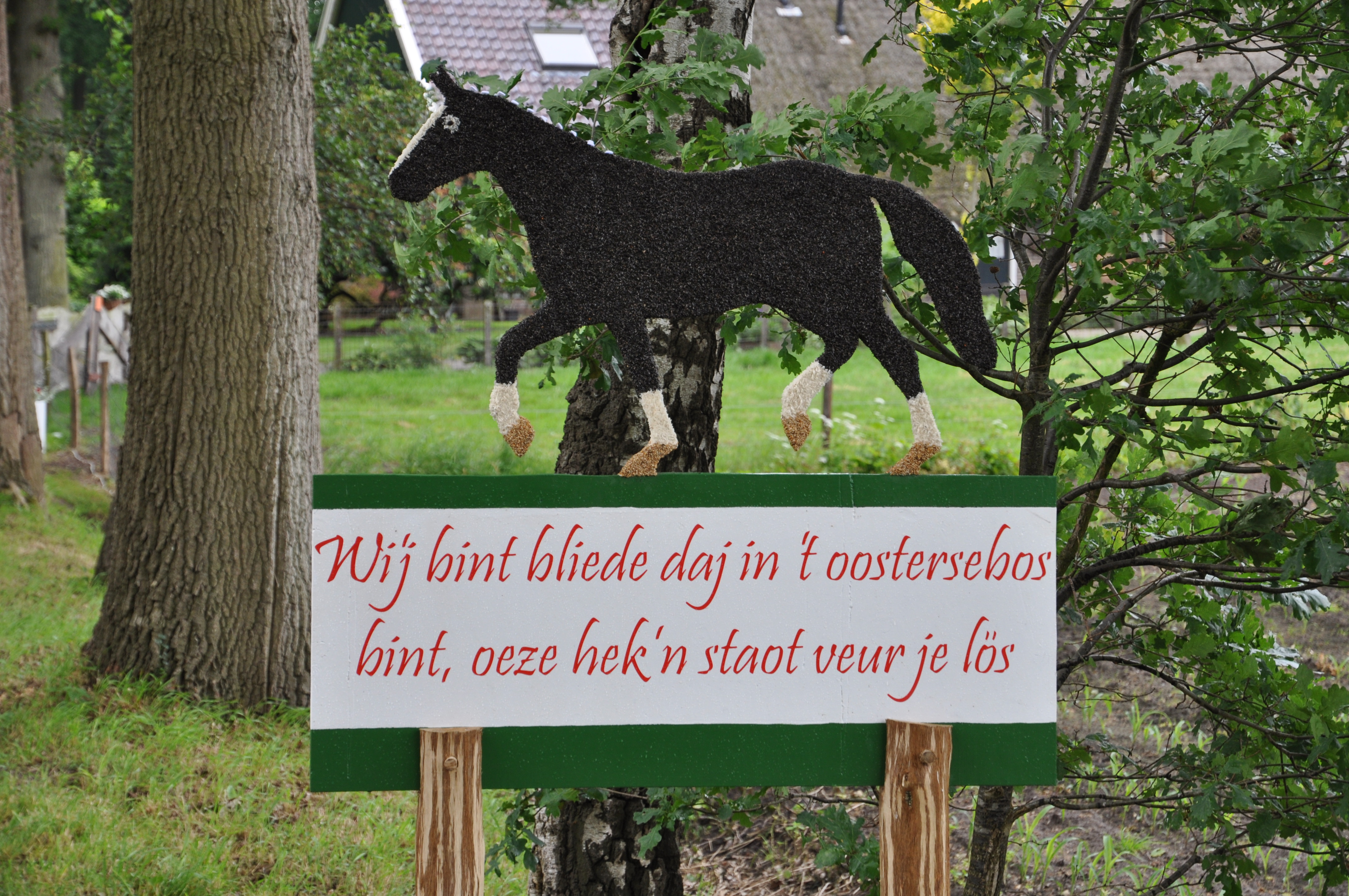
Sign in Drents at Oosterse Bos: Wi'j bint bliede daj in 't oostersebos bint, oeze hek'n staot veur je lös (lit. 'We are glad that you are in the Oostersebos, our gates are open for you', Standard Dutch Wij zijn blij dat je in het Oostersebos bent, onze hekken staan voor je los.)

Drèents (also Dreins, Dreints, Drents, Drints; Dutch: Drents) is a collective term for Westphalian dialects spoken in Drenthe, a province of the Netherlands. They are spoken by about half of the population of the province.

== Phonology ==
=== Consonants ===
		Labial	Alveolar	Retroflex	Dorsal	Glottal
Stop	voiceless	p	t	ʈ	k	
Stop	voiced	b	d	ɖ	ɡ	
Fricative	voiceless	f	s	ʂ	χ	
Fricative	voiced	v	z	ʐ		ɦ
Nasal		m	n	ɳ	ŋ	
Trill			r			
Approximant		ʋ	l	ɭ	j	

== Dialects of Drèents ==
The dialects from the north and the east (see below: 'Noordenvelds' and 'Veenkoloniaals') are somehow more related to Gronings (a Northern Low Saxon dialect), the dialects from the south-west are 'Stellingwerfs', and the dialects in a few villages along the southern border with the Grafschaft Bentheim (Germany) are considered to be Sallaans (because they have an umlaut in the diminutives).

The Stichting Drentse Taol (Drèents Language Foundation) distinguishes seven main variants of Drèents within the province, based on the research done by G.H. Kocks, the main editor of the Woordenboek der Drentse Dialecten (Dictionary of the Drèents Dialects):

- Noordenvelds
- Veenkeloniaols
- Zuudoost-Zaand-Drèents
- Zuudoost-Veen-Drèents
- Midden-Drèents
- Zuudwest-Noord-Drèents (Also see Stellingwarfs)
- Zuudwest-Zuud-Drèents

It also can be divided into Midden-Drents and Zuid-Drents.

== Examples of usage ==
Emmen dialect:	We moet'n nie zo haast'n.
Standard Dutch:	Wij hoeven ons niet zo te haasten.
English:	We do not have to hurry.

Northern Drenthe:	ien	twei	dreei	vier	vief	zes	zeum	aacht	neegn	tien
Southwest Drenthe:	iene	tweie	dreie	veere	vieve	zesse	zeum	achte	neegn	tiene
Standard Dutch:	een	twee	drie	vier	vijf	zes	zeven	acht	negen	tien
English:	one	two	three	four	five	six	seven	eight	nine	ten

Drenthe:	Ie kunt wel geliek hebb'n.
Standard Dutch:	U kunt gelijk hebben.
English:	You can be right.
