= Low German =

West Germanic language

- Low Saxon
- Plattdütsch, Plattdüütsch, Plattdütsk, Plattdüütsk, Plattduitsk (South-Westphalian), Plattduitsch (Eastphalian), Plattdietsch (Low Prussian); Neddersassisch; Nedderdüütsch
- Native to: Northern and western Germany; Eastern Netherlands; Southern Denmark
- Ethnicity: Dutch; Germans; Frisians; Russian Mennonites; Historically Saxons
- Native speakers: (Estimated 4.35–7.15 million (Note: 2.2–5 million in northern Germany and 2.15 million in eastern Netherlands); Up to 10 million second-language speakers cited 2001)
- Language family: Indo-European: Germanic; West Germanic; North Sea Germanic; Low German
- Early forms: Old Saxon: Middle Low German
- Dialects: Low Saxon; East Low German
- Writing system: Latin

Official status
- Recognised minority language in: Netherlands Germany: Schleswig-Holstein; Hamburg; Lower Saxony; Saxony-Anhalt; Mecklenburg-Vorpommern; Brandenburg; Bolivia (70,000) Paraguay (30,000) Brazil (8,000)

Language codes
- ISO 639-2: nds
- ISO 639-3: nds (Dutch varieties and Westphalian have separate codes)
- Glottolog: lowg1239 Low German
- Linguasphere: 52-ACB
- Post-1945 Low German language area in Europe. In almost all parts, High German has replaced Low German as the majority language and language used in daily life.

Low German (Note: "Low German" is known by the following other names in other languages. It is known in the Low German of Germany as Plattdütsch, Plattdüütsch, Plattdütsk, Plattdüütsk, Plattduitsk (South-Westphalian), Plattduitsch (Eastphalian), Plattdietsch (Low Prussian), or Neddersassisch, or Nedderdüütsch; in the Low Saxon of the Netherlands as Nedersaksisch; in (Standard) High German as Plattdeutsch, Niedersächsisch, Niederdeutsch (in a stricter sense) or Platt, pronounced [plat] (which can also mean dialect and refer to non-Low German varieties); in Dutch as Saksisch, Nedersaksisch, Platduits, Nederduits [ˈneːdərdœyts] (in a stricter sense); in Danish as Plattysk; plus, other dialectal variants exist.) is a West Germanic language spoken mainly in Northern Germany and the northeastern Netherlands. The dialect of Plautdietsch is also spoken in the Russian Mennonite diaspora worldwide. "Low" refers to the altitude of the areas where it is typically spoken.

Low German is most closely related to Frisian and English, with which it forms the North Sea Germanic group of the West Germanic languages. Like Dutch, it has historically been spoken north of the Benrath and Uerdingen isoglosses, while forms of High German (of which Standard German is a standardized example) have historically been spoken south of those lines. Like Frisian, English, Dutch and the North Germanic languages, Low German has not undergone the High German consonant shift, as opposed to Standard High German, which is based on High German dialects. Low German evolved from Old Saxon (Old Low German), which is most closely related to Old Frisian and Old English (Anglo-Saxon).

The Low German dialects spoken in the Netherlands are mostly referred to as Low Saxon, those spoken in northwestern Germany (Lower Saxony, Westphalia, Schleswig-Holstein, Hamburg, Bremen, and Saxony-Anhalt west of the Elbe) as either Low German or Low Saxon, and those spoken in northeastern Germany (Mecklenburg-Western Pomerania, Brandenburg, and Saxony-Anhalt east of the Elbe) mostly as Low German, not being part of Low Saxon. This is because northwestern Germany and the northeastern Netherlands were the area of settlement of the Saxons (Old Saxony), while Low German spread to northeastern Germany through eastward migration of Low German speakers into areas with an originally Slavic-speaking population. This area is known as Germania Slavica, where the former Slavic influence is still visible in the names of settlements and physiogeographical features.

It has been estimated that Low German has approximately 2–5 million speakers in Germany, primarily Northern Germany (ranging from well to very well), and 2.15 million in the Netherlands (ranging from reasonable to very well).

== Geographical extent ==
=== Inside Europe ===
==== Germany ====
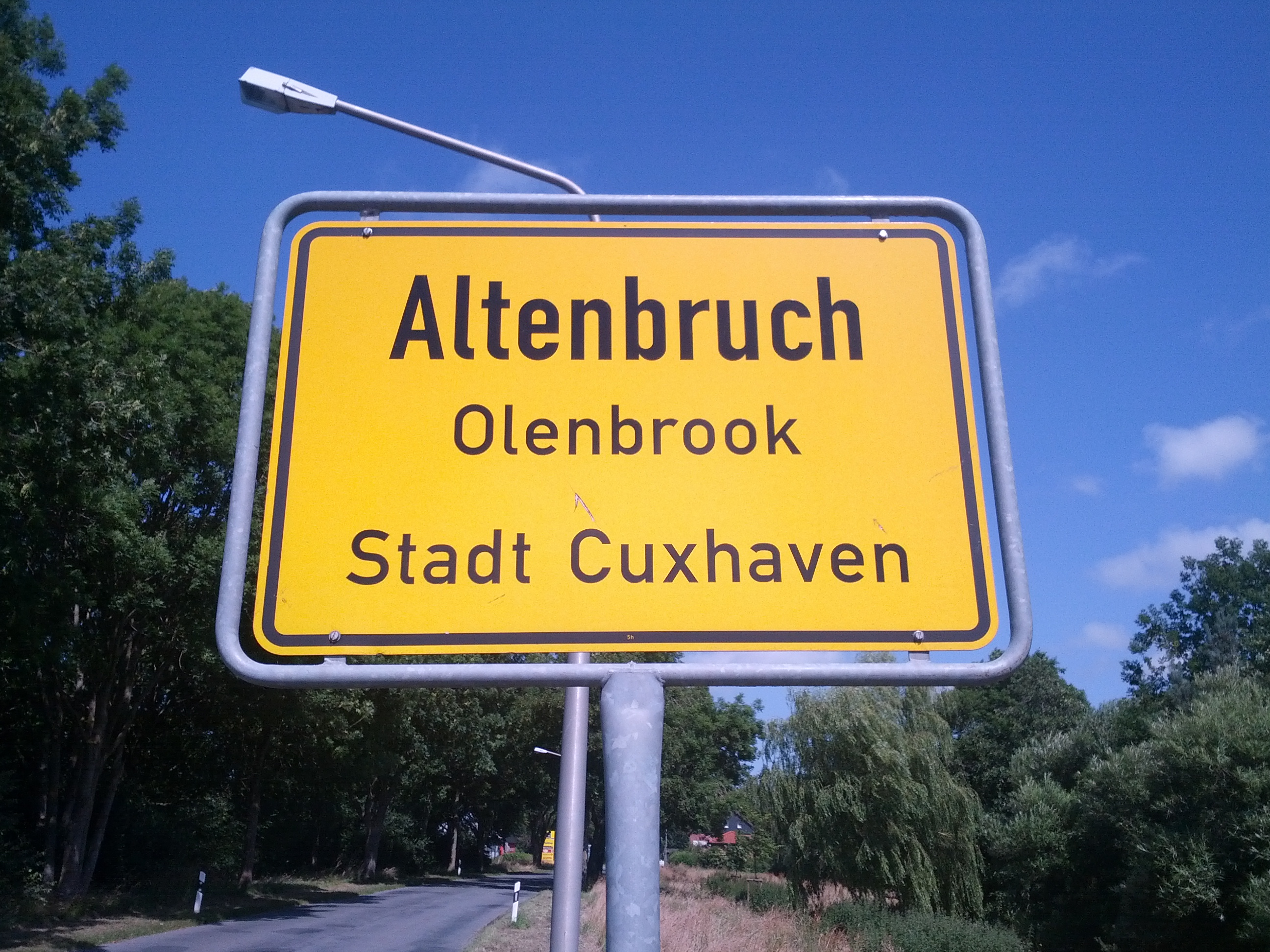
City limit sign in Lower Saxony showing that Low German is closer to English for Altenbruch (meaning 'old bog/swamp'), an incorporated village of Cuxhaven. The name in Low German is Olenbrook.

It has been estimated that Low German has approximately two to five million speakers (depending on the definition of 'native speaker') in Germany, primarily in Northern Germany.

Variants of Low German are spoken in most parts of Northern Germany, for instance in the states of Lower Saxony, North Rhine-Westphalia, Hamburg, Bremen, Schleswig-Holstein, Mecklenburg-Vorpommern, Saxony-Anhalt, and Brandenburg. Small portions of northern Hesse and northern Thuringia are traditionally Low Saxon-speaking too. Historically, Low German was also spoken in formerly German parts of Poland (e.g., Pomerania and Silesia), as well as in East Prussia and the Baltic provinces (modern Estonia and Latvia). The Baltic Germans spoke a distinct Low German dialect, which has influenced the vocabulary and phonetics of both Estonian and Latvian. The historical sprachraum of Low German also included contemporary northern Poland, East Prussia (the modern Kaliningrad Oblast of Russia), a part of western Lithuania, and the German communities in Estonia and Latvia, most notably their Hanseatic cities. German speakers in this area fled the Red Army or were forcibly expelled after the border changes at the end of World War II.

The language was also formerly spoken in the outer areas of what is now the city-state of Berlin, but in the course of urbanisation and national centralisation in that city, the language has vanished (the Berlin dialect itself is a northern outpost of High German, though it has some Low German features).

Today, there are still speakers outside Germany to be found in the coastal areas of present-day Poland (minority of ethnic German East Pomeranian speakers who were not expelled from Pomerania, as well as the regions around Braniewo). In the Southern Jutland region of Denmark there may still be some Low German speakers in some German minority communities, but the Low German dialects of Denmark can be considered moribund at this time.

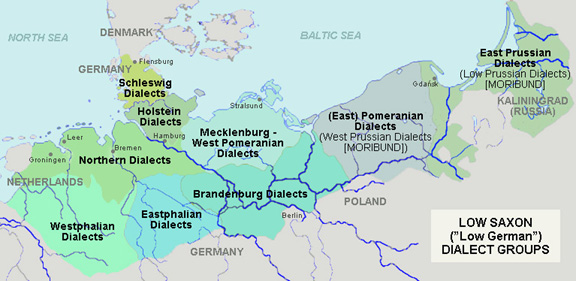
Low German-speaking area before the expulsion of almost all Low German- and German-speakers from east of the Oder–Neisse line in 1945. Low German-speaking provinces of Germany east of the Oder, before 1945, were Pomerania with its capital Stettin (now Szczecin, Poland), where east of the Oder East Pomeranian dialects were spoken, and East Prussia with its capital Königsberg (now Kaliningrad, Russia), where Low Prussian dialects were spoken. Danzig (now Gdańsk, Poland) was also a Low German-speaking city before 1945, and its former dialect Danzig German is also classified as Low Prussian.

Self-reported Low German speakers
State	'Well' or 'very well'		'Very well' only	
State	% of pop.	Numbers	% of pop.	Numbers
Schleswig-Holstein	24.5%	694,085	16.5%	467,445
North Rhine-Westphalia	11.8%	2,103,940	5.2%	927,160
Lower Saxony	15.4%	1,218,756	4.7%	371,958
Hamburg	9.5%	169,860	3.2%	57,216
Bremen	17.6%	116,336	9.9%	65,439
Brandenburg	2.8%	70,000	2.6%	65,000
Mecklenburg-Vorpommern	20.7%	339,273	5.9%	96,701
Saxony-Anhalt	11.8%	275,058	2.2%	51,282
Entire Low German dialect area	15.7%	4,987,308	6.2%	2,197,205

==== The Netherlands ====
Dialects of Low German are spoken in the northeastern area of the Netherlands (Dutch Low Saxon) by approximately 1.6 million speakers. These dialects are written with an unstandardized orthography based on Standard Dutch orthography. The position of the language is, according to UNESCO, vulnerable. Between 1995 and 2011 the numbers of parent speakers dropped from 34% in 1995 to 15% in 2011. Numbers of child speakers dropped from 8% to 2% in the same period. According to a 2005 study 53% speak Low Saxon or Low Saxon and Dutch at home and 71% could speak it in the researched area, resulting in a speaker total of 1.6 million who use the language at home and 2.15 million in total being able to speak the language. Another source puts the total number of speakers is at 1.7 million. There are speakers in the Dutch north and eastern provinces of Groningen, Drenthe, Stellingwerf (part of Friesland), Overijssel, Gelderland, Utrecht and Flevoland, in several dialect groups per province.

=== Outside Europe and the Mennonites ===
There are also immigrant communities where Low German is spoken in the Western hemisphere, including Canada, the United States, Mexico, Belize, Venezuela, Bolivia, Argentina, Brazil, Paraguay and Uruguay. In some of these countries, the language is part of the Mennonite religion and culture. There are Mennonite communities in Ontario, Saskatchewan, Alberta, British Columbia, Manitoba, Kansas and Minnesota which use Low German in their religious services and communities. These Mennonites are descended from primarily Dutch settlers that had initially settled in the Vistula delta region of Prussia in the 16th and 17th centuries before moving to newly acquired Russian territories in Ukraine in the late 18th and early 19th centuries, and then to the Americas in the 19th and early 20th centuries. The types of Low German spoken in these communities and in the Midwest region of the United States have diverged since emigration. The survival of the language is tenuous in many places, and has died out in many places where assimilation has occurred. Members and friends of the Historical Society of North German Settlements in western New York (Bergholz, New York), a community of Lutherans who trace their immigration from Pomerania in the 1840s, hold quarterly "Plattdeutsch lunch" events, where remaining speakers of the language gather to share and preserve the dialect. Mennonite colonies in Paraguay, Belize, and Chihuahua, Mexico, have made Low German a "co-official language" of the community.

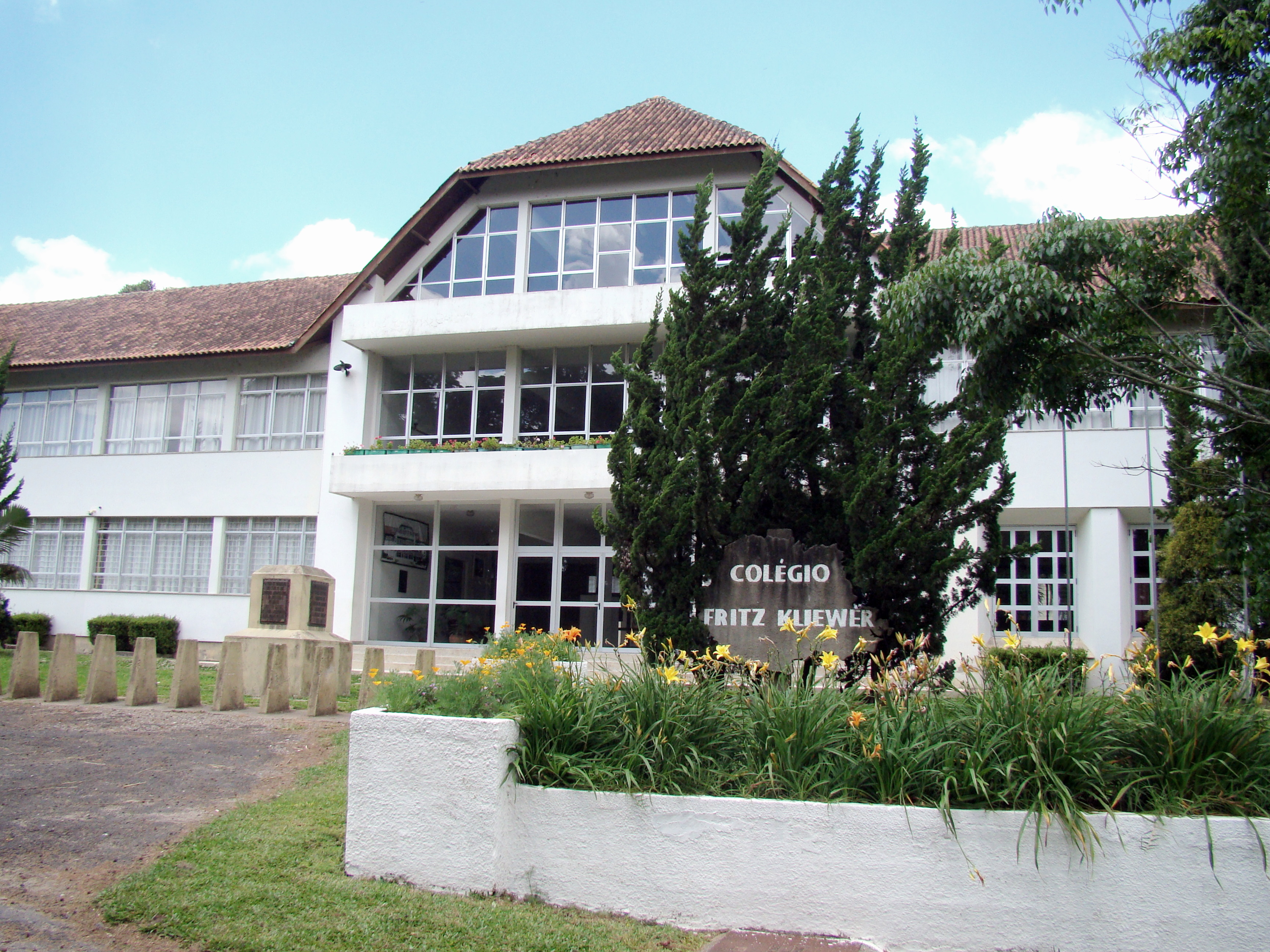
A public school in Witmarsum Colony (Paraná, Southern Brazil) teaches in the Portuguese language and in Plautdietsch.

East Pomeranian is also spoken in parts of southern and southeastern Brazil, in the latter especially in the state of Espírito Santo, being official in five municipalities, and spoken among its ethnically European migrants elsewhere, primarily in the states of Rio de Janeiro and Rondônia. East Pomeranian-speaking regions of Southern Brazil are often assimilated into the general German Brazilian population and culture, for example celebrating the Oktoberfest, and there can even be a language shift from it to Riograndenser Hunsrückisch in some areas. In Espírito Santo, nevertheless, Pomeranian Brazilians are more often proud of their language, and particular religious traditions and culture, and not uncommonly inheriting the nationalism of their ancestors, being more likely to accept marriages of its members with Brazilians of origins other than a Germanic Central European one than to assimilate with Brazilians of Swiss, Austrian, Czech, and non-East Pomeranian-speaking German and Prussian heritage – that were much more numerous immigrants to both Brazilian regions (and whose language almost faded out in the latter, due to assimilation and internal migration), by themselves less numerous than the Italian ones (with only Venetian communities in areas of highly Venetian presence conserving Talian, and other Italian languages and dialects fading out elsewhere).

Speakers of low German outside Europe

Approximate distribution of native speakers of German or a German variety outside Europe (according to Ethnologue 2016 unless referenced otherwise) Numbers of speakers should not be summed up per country, as they most likely overlap considerably. Table includes varieties with disputed statuses as separate language.
	Standard German	Hunsrik/Hunsrückisch	Low German & Plautdietsch	Pennsylvania Dutch	Hutterite
Argentina	400,000	—N/a	4,000	—N/a	—N/a
Australia	79,000	—N/a	—N/a	—N/a	—N/a
Belize	—N/a	—N/a	9,360	—N/a	—N/a
Bolivia	160,000	—N/a	60,000	—N/a	—N/a
Brazil	1,500,000	3,000,000	8,000	—N/a	—N/a
Canada	430,000	—N/a	80,000	15,000	23,200
Chile	35,000	—N/a	—N/a	—N/a	—N/a
Ireland	40,000	—N/a	—N/a	—N/a	—N/a
Israel	200,000	—N/a	—N/a	—N/a	—N/a
Kazakhstan	30,400	—N/a	100,000	—N/a	—N/a
Mexico	—N/a	—N/a	40,000	—N/a	—N/a
Namibia	22,500	—N/a	—N/a	—N/a	—N/a
New Zealand	36,000	—N/a	—N/a	—N/a	—N/a
Paraguay	166,000	—N/a	40,000	—N/a	—N/a
Peru	2,000	—N/a	5,000	—N/a	—N/a
Russia	—N/a	—N/a	—N/a	—N/a	—N/a
South Africa	12,000	—N/a	—N/a	—N/a	—N/a
Uruguay	28,000	—N/a	2,000	—N/a	—N/a
United Kingdom	55,000	—N/a	—N/a	—N/a	—N/a
United States	1,104,354	—N/a	12,000	118,000	10,800
Sum	4,599,392	3,000,000	362,360	133,000	34,000

== Nomenclature ==
The language grouping of Low German is referred to, in the language itself as well as in its umbrella languages of German and Dutch, in several different ways, ranging from official names such as Niederdeutsch and Nederduits to more general characterisations such as "dialect". The proliferation of names or characterisations is due in part to the grouping stretching mainly across two different countries and to it being a collection of varieties rather than a standardised language.

There are different uses of the term "Low German":

- A specific name of any West Germanic varieties that neither have taken part in the High German consonant shift nor classify as Low Franconian or Anglo-Frisian; this is the scope discussed in this article.
- A broader term for the closely related, continental West Germanic languages unaffected by the High German consonant shift, nor classifying as Anglo-Frisian, and thus including Low Franconian varieties.

In Germany, native speakers of Low German call their language Platt, Plattdütsch, Plattdüütsch, Plattdütsk, Plattdüütsk, Plattduitsk (South-Westphalian), Plattduitsch (Eastphalian), Plattdietsch (Low Prussian), or Nedderdüütsch. In the Netherlands, native speakers refer to their language as dialect, plat, Nedersaksisch, or the name of their village, town or district.

Officially, Low German is called niederdeutsche Sprache or plattdeutsche Sprache (Nether or Low German language), Niederdeutsch or Plattdeutsch (Nether or Low German) in High German by the German authorities, nedderdüütsche Spraak (Nether or Low German language), Nedderdüütsch or Plattdüütsch (Nether or Low German) in Low German by the German authorities and Nedersaksisch (Nether or Low Saxon) by the Dutch authorities. Plattdeutsch, Niederdeutsch and Platduits, Nedersaksisch are seen in linguistic texts from the German and Dutch linguistic communities respectively.

In Danish it is called plattysk, nedertysk or, rarely, lavtysk. Mennonite Low German is called Plautdietsch.

"Low" refers to the flat plains and coastal area of the northern European lowlands, contrasted with the mountainous areas of central and southern Germany, Switzerland, and Austria, where High German (Highland German) is spoken. (Note: cf. the definition of high in the Oxford English Dictionary (Concise Edition): "[…] situated far above ground, sea level, etc; upper, inland, as […] High German".)

The colloquial term Platt denotes both Low German dialects and any non-standard Western variety of German; this use is chiefly found in northern and western Germany and is not considered to be linguistically correct.

The ISO 639-2 language code for Low German has been nds (Niedersächsisch or Nedersaksisch, Neddersassisch) since May 2000.

== Classification ==
Low German is a part of the continental West Germanic dialect continuum. To the West, it blends into the Low Franconian languages, including Dutch. A distinguishing feature between the Low Franconian varieties and Low German varieties is the plural of the verbs. Low German varieties have a common verbal plural ending, whereas Low Franconian varieties have a different form for the second person plural. This is complicated in that in most Low Franconian varieties, including standard Dutch, the original second-person plural form has replaced the singular. Some dialects, including again standard Dutch, innovated a new second-person plural form in the last few centuries, using the other plural forms as the source.

To the South, Low German blends into the High German dialects of Central German that have been affected by the High German consonant shift. The division is usually drawn at the Benrath line that traces the maken – machen isogloss.

To the East, it abuts the Kashubian language (the only remnant of the Pomeranian language) and, since the expulsion of nearly all Germans from the Polish part of Pomerania following the Second World War, also by the Polish language. East Pomeranian and Central Pomeranian are dialects of Low German.

To the North and Northwest, it abuts the Danish and the Frisian languages. In Germany, Low German has replaced the Danish and Frisian languages in many regions. Saterland Frisian is the only remnant of East Frisian language and is surrounded by Low German, as are the few remaining North Frisian varieties, and the Low German dialects of those regions have influences from Frisian substrates.

Most linguists classify the dialects of Low German together with English and Frisian as the North Sea Germanic or Ingvaeonic languages. However, most exclude Low German from the group often called Anglo-Frisian languages because some distinctive features of that group of languages are only partially preserved in Low German, for instance the Ingvaeonic nasal spirant law (some dialects have us, os for "us" whereas others have uns, ons), and because other distinctive features almost do not occur in Low German at all, for instance the palatalization and assibilation of /k/ (compare palatalized forms such as English cheese, Frisian tsiis to non-palatalized forms such as Low German Kees or Kaise, Dutch kaas, German Käse but Low German Sever/Sebber while German Käfer) Because Old Saxon came under strong Old High German and Old Low Franconian influence early on and therefore lost many Ingvaeonic features that were to be found much more extensively in earlier language states.

=== Language or dialect ===
The question of whether today's Low German should be considered a separate language or a dialect of German or even Dutch has been a point of contention. Although Low German is mostly regarded as an independent language, linguistics offers no simple, generally accepted criterion to decide the question.

Scholarly arguments have been put forward for classifying Low German as a German dialect. As stated above, the arguments are not linguistic but rather sociopolitical and revolve mainly around the fact that Low German has no official standard form or use in sophisticated media. The situation of Low German may thus be considered a "pseudo-dialectized abstand language" ("scheindialektisierte Abstandsprache"). In contrast, Old Saxon and Middle Low German are generally considered separate languages in their own right. Since Low German has strongly declined since the 18th century, the perceived similarities with High German or Dutch may often be direct adaptations from the dominating standard language, resulting in a growing inability by speakers to speak correctly what was once Low German proper.

Others have argued for the independence of today's Low German dialects, taken as continuous outflow of the Old Saxon and Middle Low German tradition. Glottolog classifies six varieties of Low German as distinct languages based on a low degree of mutual intelligibility. Eastern Low German and Plautdietsch are classified as part of Greater East Low German, while Eastphalian, Westphalic, and the North Low Saxon languages, German Northern Low Saxon and Gronings, are classified as part of West Low German.

=== Legal status ===
Low German has been recognized by the Netherlands and by Germany (since 1999) as a regional language according to the European Charter for Regional or Minority Languages. Within the official terminology defined in the charter, this status would not be available to a dialect of an official language (as per article 1a), and hence not to Low German in Germany if it were considered a dialect of German. Advocates of the promotion of Low German have expressed considerable hope that this political development will at once lend legitimacy to their claim that Low German is a separate language, and help mitigate the functional limits of the language that may still be cited as objective criteria for a mere dialect (such as the virtually complete absence from legal and administrative contexts, schools, the media, etc.).

At the request of Schleswig-Holstein, the German government has declared Low German as a regional language. German offices in Schleswig-Holstein are obliged to accept and handle applications in Low German on the same footing as Standard High German applications. The Bundesgerichtshof ruled in a case that this was even to be done at the patent office in Munich, in a non–Low German region, when the applicant then had to pay the charge for a translator, because applications in Low German are considered not to be written in the German language.

== Varieties of Low German ==
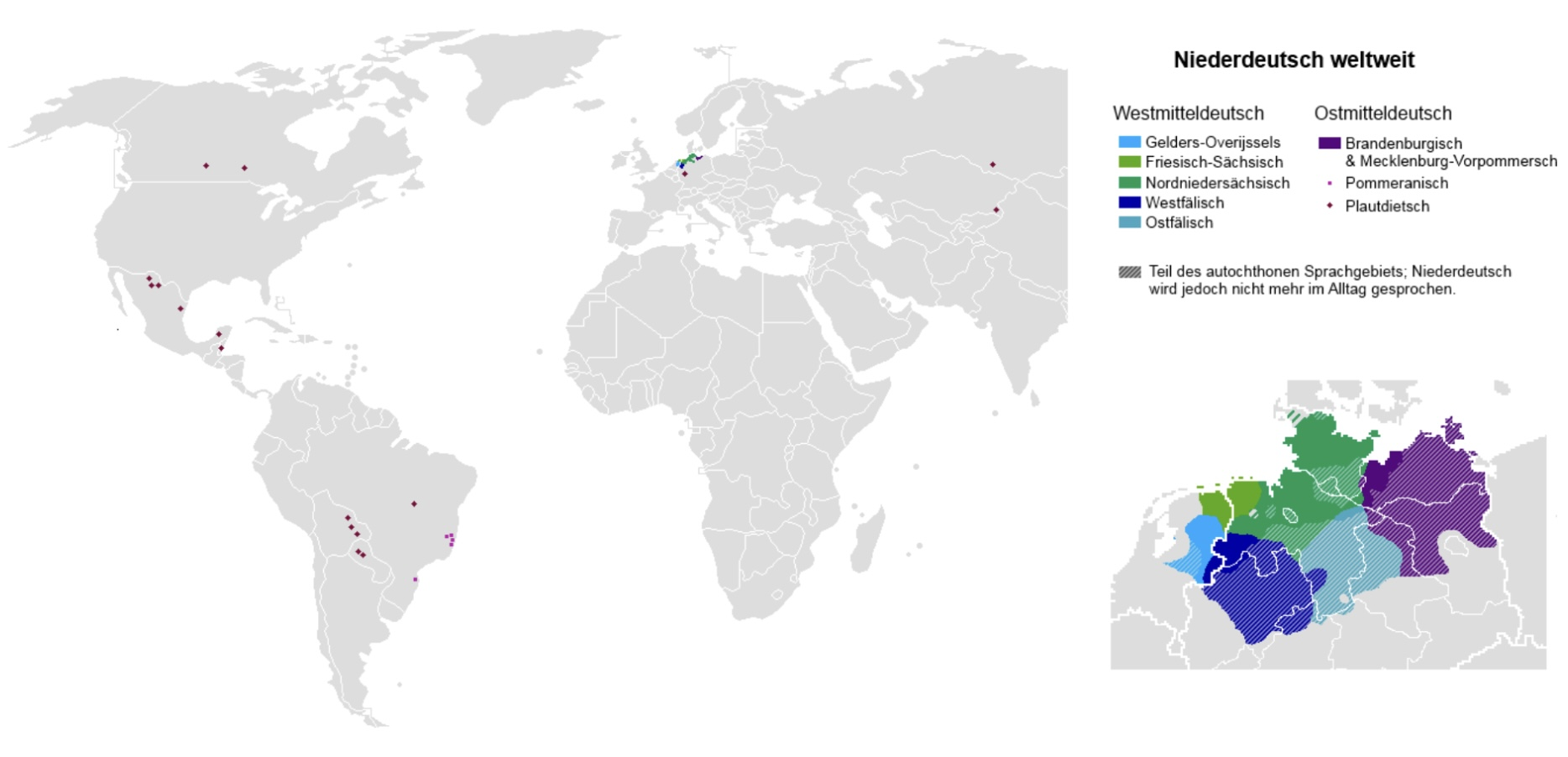
Low German dialects around the world

- Low Saxon or West Low German
  - East Frisian Low Saxon
  - Northern Low Saxon
    - Holsteinian (Holsteinisch)
    - Schleswigian (Schleswigsch)
    - Dithmarsch (Dithmarsisch)
    - North Hanoverian (Nordhannoversch)
    - Emslandish (Emsländisch)
    - Oldenburgish (Oldenburgisch)
    - Gronings and Noord-Drents
      - Hogelandsters
      - Oldambtsters
      - Stadsgronings
      - Veenkoloniaals
      - Westerkwartiers
        - Kollumerpompsters
        - Kollumerlands
        - Middaglands
        - Midden-Westerkwartiers
        - Zuid-Westerkwartiers
      - Westerwolds
  - Westphalian (Westfälisch)
    - Westmünsterländisch
    - Münsterländisch
    - South Westphalian (Südwestfälisch)
    - East Westphalian (Ostwestfälisch)
    - Stellingwerfs
    - Drents
      - Midden-Drents
      - Zuid-Drents
    - Twents
      - Twents-Graafschaps
      - Twents
    - Gelders-Overijssels
      - Achterhoeks
      - Sallands
      - Oost-Veluws (partly classified as Veluws)
      - Urkers
    - Veluws
      - Oost-Veluws (partly classified as Gelders-Overijssels)
      - West-Veluws
  - Eastphalian (Ostfälisch)
- East Low German
  - Brandenburgisch
  - Mecklenburgisch-Vorpommersch
  - Central Pomeranian (Mittelpommersch)
  - East Pomeranian (Ostpommersch)
    - Neumärkisch (partly classified as Marchian Brandenburgish, Central Pomeranian and South Märkisch)
  - Low Prussian (Niederpreußisch)
  - Plautdietsch (Mennonite Low German, used also in many other countries)
  - Koschneiderisch language (partly classified as East Pomeranian)

== History ==
=== Old Saxon ===
Old Saxon (Altsächsisch), also known as Old Low German (Altniederdeutsch), is a West Germanic language. It is documented from the 9th century until the 12th century, when it evolved into Middle Low German. It was spoken on the north-west coast of Germany by Saxon peoples. It is closely related to Old Anglo-Frisian (Old Frisian, Old English), partially participating in the Ingvaeonic nasal spirant law.

Only a few texts survive, predominantly in baptismal vows the Saxons were required to perform at the behest of Charlemagne. The only literary texts preserved are Heliand and the Old Saxon Genesis.

Altniederdeutsch (Old Saxon); Mittelniederdeutsch (Middle Low German); Niederdeutsch (Modern Low German)

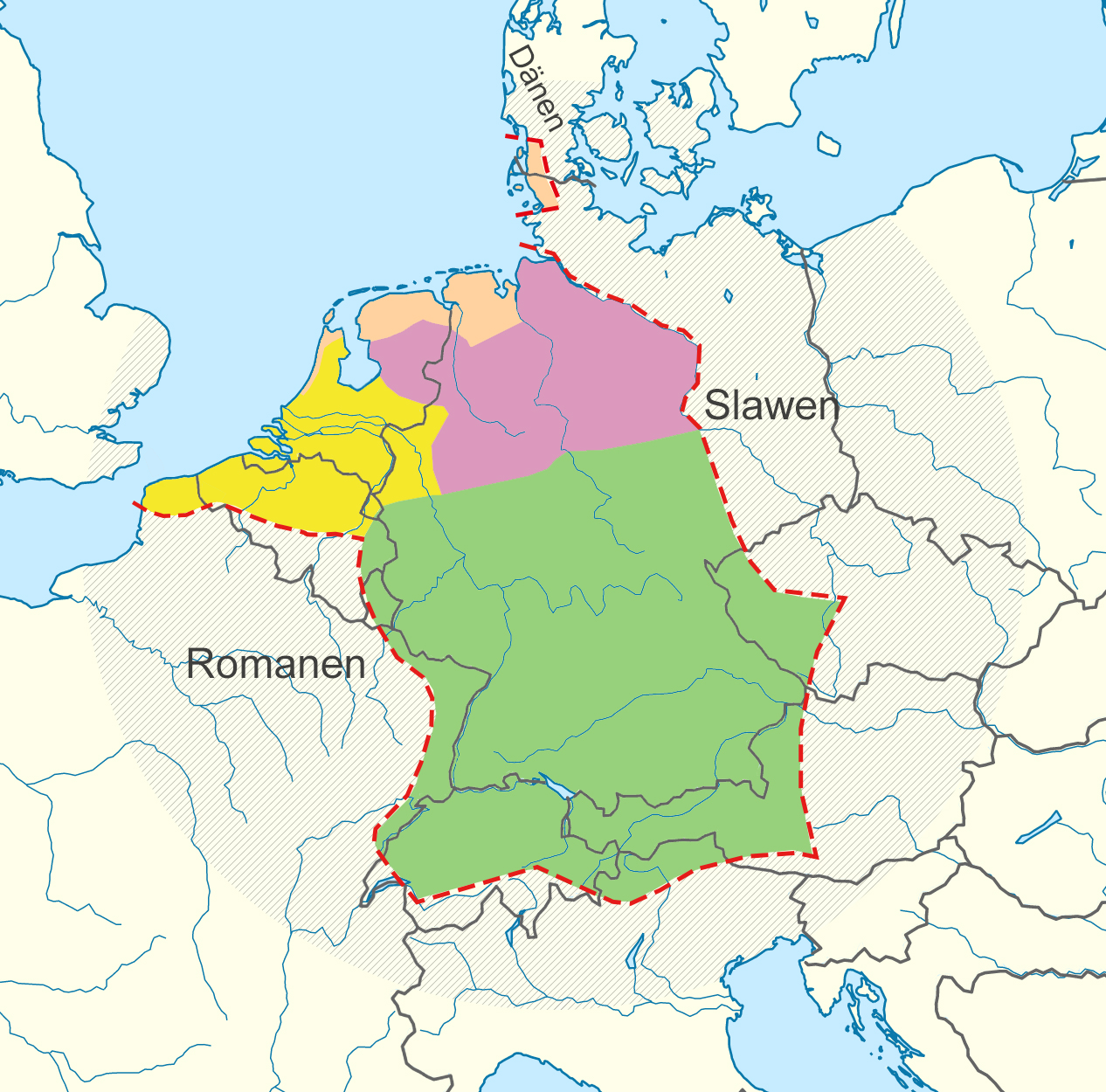
Old Saxon speaking area (shown in purple)

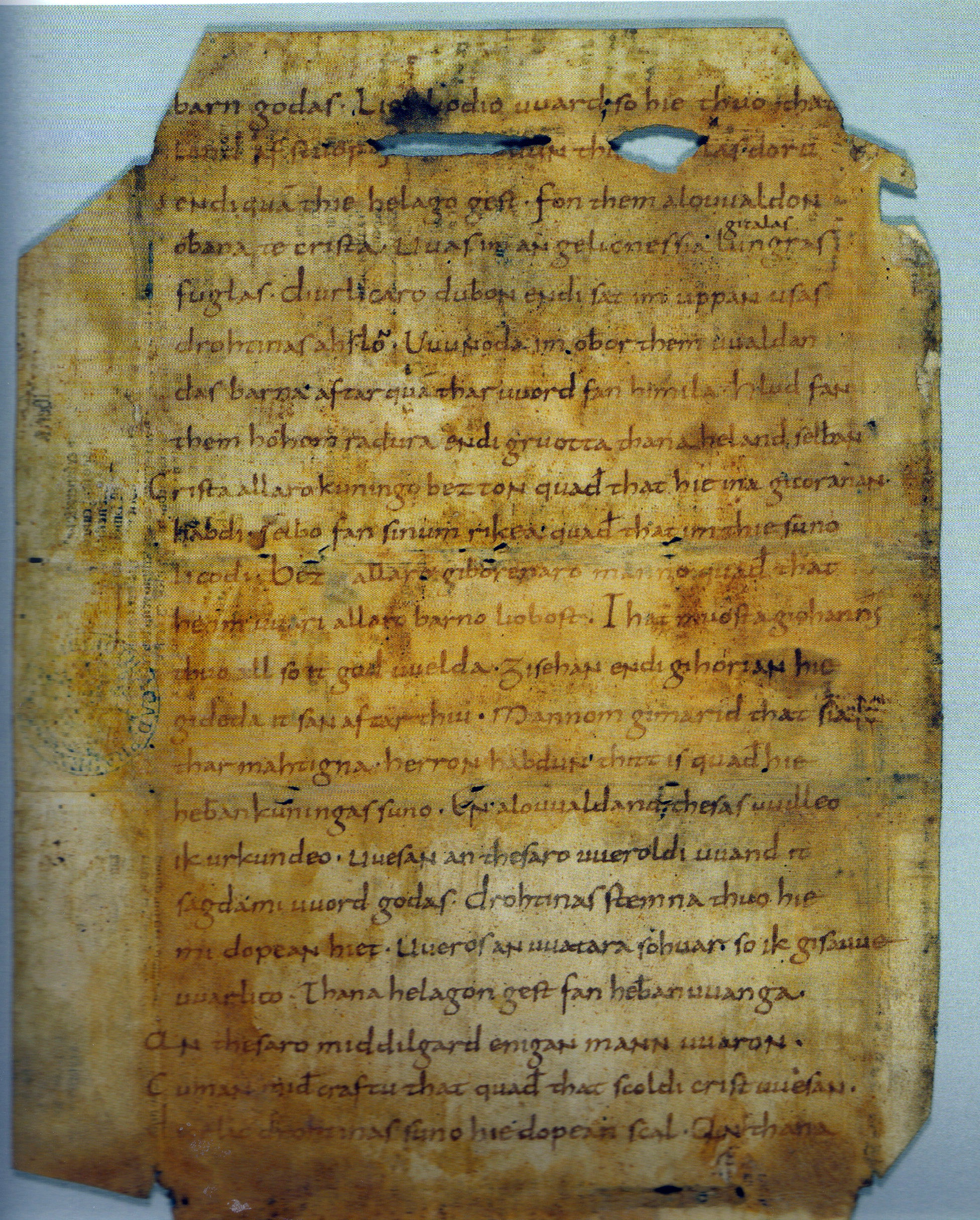
Heliand – fragment, one of the most important testimonies of Old Saxon

=== Middle Low German ===
The Middle Low German language (Mittelniederdeutsch) is an ancestor of modern Low German. It was spoken from about 1100 to 1600. At the time it was known as Sassisch or de Sassische sprâke in Middle Low German and the region in which it was spoken Sassenlant. The neighbouring languages within the dialect continuum of the West Germanic languages were Middle Dutch in the West and Middle High German in the South; the latter developed into Early New High German. Middle Low German was the lingua franca of the Hanseatic League, spoken all around the North Sea and the Baltic Sea. It had a significant influence on the Scandinavian languages and other languages around the Baltic Sea. Originally thought to be based on the Lübecker Norm, the language of Lübeck, Middle Low German was the leading written language in the north of Central Europe, and a standardised written language was developing, although it was never codified.

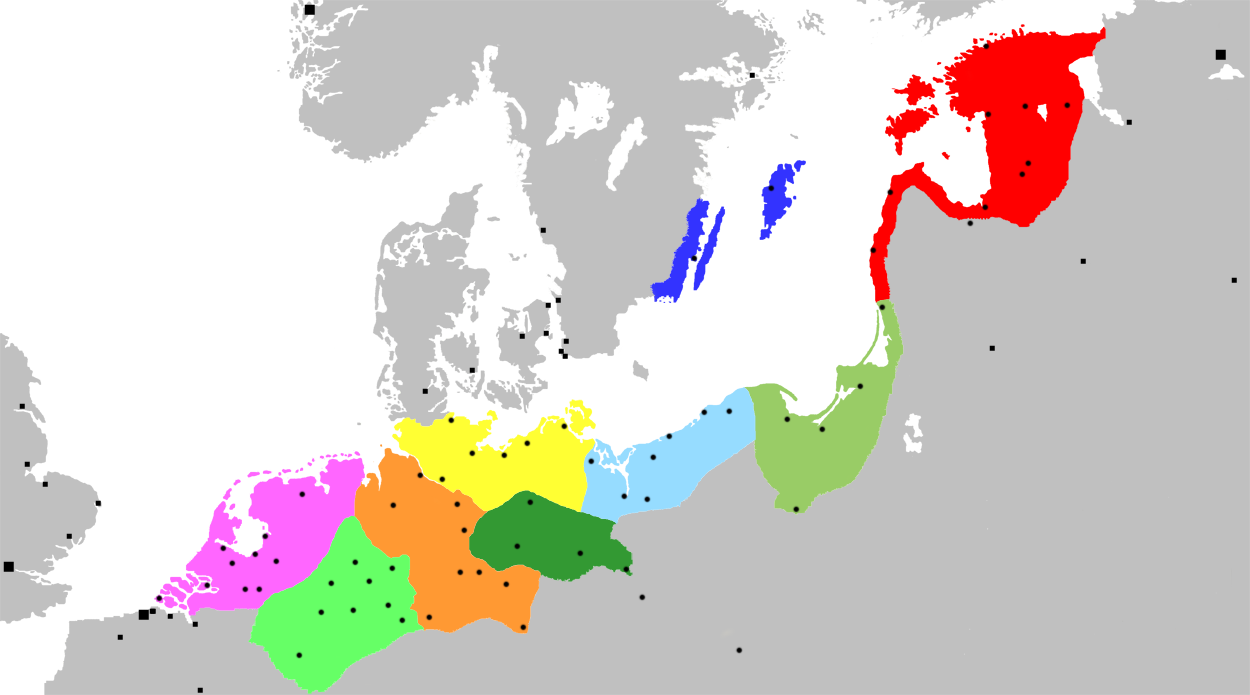
Hanseatic main area

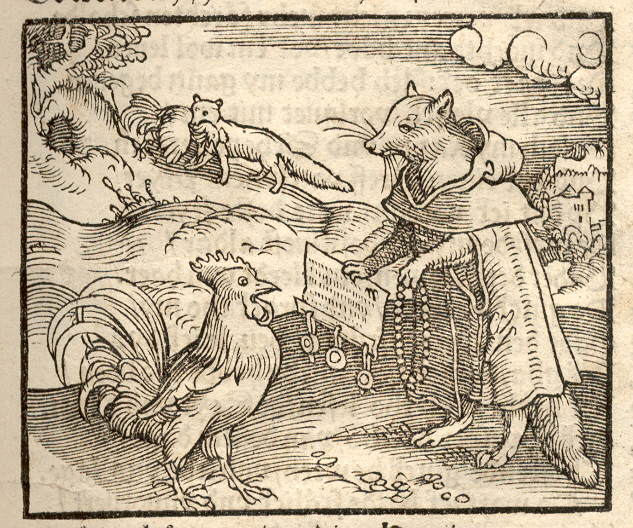
Reyneke de Vos is the most important Middle Low German animal epic in verse.

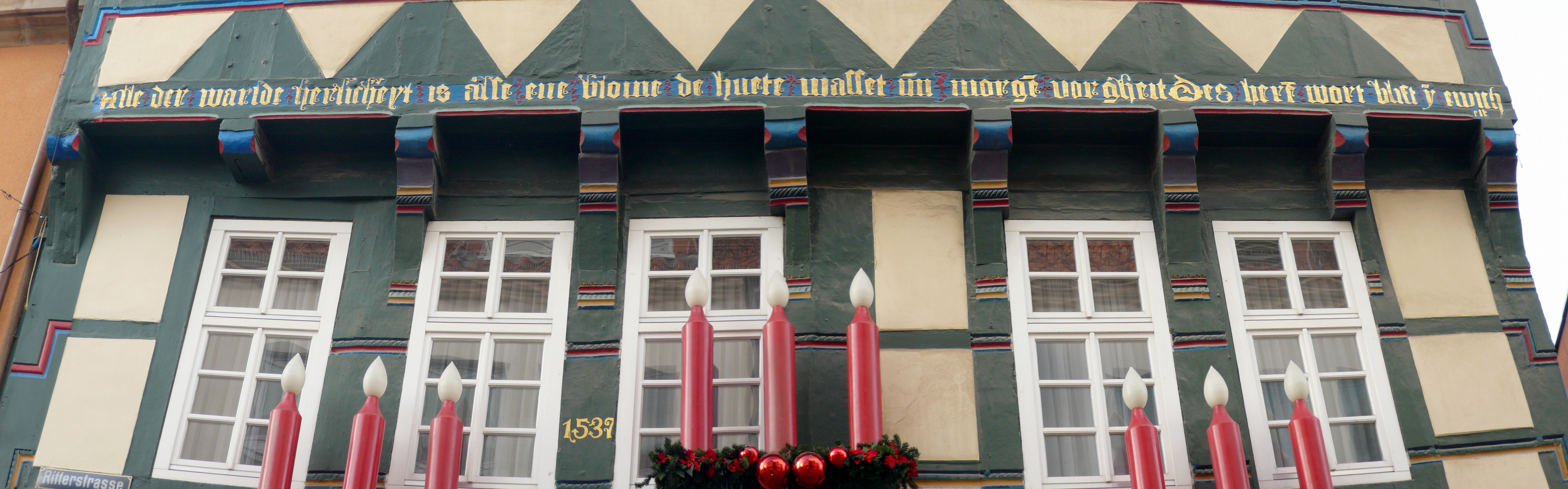
Inscription in Middle Low German on a house at Hameln: "Alle der warlde herlicheyt is alse ene blome de huete wasset un morgen vorgheit. Des herrn wort blift yn ewicheit." (All the world's magnificence is like a flower that grows today and vanishes tomorrow; the Lord's word remains in eternity.)

=== Contemporary ===
There is a distinction between the German and the Dutch Low Saxon/Low German situation.

==== Germany ====
After mass education in Germany in the 19th and 20th centuries, the slow decline which Low German had been experiencing since the end of the Hanseatic League turned into a free fall. The decision to exclude Low German in formal education was not without controversy, however. On one hand, proponents of Low German advocated that since it had a strong cultural and historical value and was the native language of students in northern Germany, it had a place in the classroom. On the other hand, High German was considered the language of education, science, and national unity, and since schools promoted these values, High German was seen as the best candidate for the language of instruction.

Initially, regional languages and dialects were thought to limit the intellectual ability of their speakers. When historical linguists illustrated the archaic character of certain features and constructions of Low German, this was seen as a sign of its "backwardness". It was not until the efforts of proponents such as Klaus Groth that this impression changed. Groth's publications demonstrated that Low German was a valuable language in its own right, and he was able to convince others that Low German was suitable for literary arts and was a national treasure worth keeping.

Through the works of advocates like Groth, both proponents and opponents of Low German in formal education saw the language's innate value as the cultural and historical language of northern Germany. Nevertheless, opponents claimed that it should simply remain a spoken and informal language to be used on the street and in the home, but not in formal schooling. In their opinion, it simply did not match the nationally unifying power of High German. As a result, while Low German literature was deemed worthy of being taught in school, High German was chosen as the language of scholarly instruction. With High German the language of education and Low German the language of the home and daily life, a stable diglossia developed in Northern Germany. Various Low German dialects are understood by 10 million people, but many fewer are native speakers.

The KDE project supports Low German (nds) as a language for its computer desktop environment, as does the GNOME Desktop Project. Open-source software has been translated into Low German; this used to be coordinated via a page on SourceForge, but as of 2015, the most active project is that of KDE.

==== Netherlands ====
In the early 20th century, scholars in the Netherlands argued that speaking dialects hindered language acquisition, and it was therefore strongly discouraged. As education improved, and mass communication became more widespread, the Low Saxon dialects further declined, although decline has been greater in urban centres of the Low Saxon regions. When in 1975 dialect folk and rock bands such as Normaal and Boh Foi Toch became successful with their overt disapproval of what they experienced as "misplaced Dutch snobbery" and the Western Dutch contempt for (speakers of) Low Saxon dialects, they gained a following among the more rurally oriented inhabitants, launching Low Saxon as a sub-culture. They inspired contemporary dialect artists and rock bands, such as Daniël Lohues, Mooi Wark, Jovink en de Voederbietels, Hádiejan Nonetheless, the position of the language is vulnerable according to UNESCO. Low Saxon is still spoken more widely than in Northern Germany. Efforts are made in Germany and in the Netherlands to protect Low German as a regional language.

== Phonetic and grammatical changes ==
=== High German consonant shift ===
As with the Anglo-Frisian and North Germanic languages, Low German has not been influenced by the High German consonant shift except for old /ð/ having shifted to /d/. Therefore, a lot of Low German words sound similar to their English counterparts. One feature that does distinguish Low German from English generally is final devoicing of obstruents, as exemplified by the words 'good' and 'wind' below. This is a characteristic of Dutch and German as well and involves positional neutralization of voicing contrast in the coda position for obstruents (i.e. t = d at the end of a syllable.) This is not used in English except in the Yorkshire dialect, where there is a process known as Yorkshire assimilation.

For instance: water [wɒtɜ, ˈwatɜ, ˈwætɜ], later [ˈlɒːtɜ, ˈlaːtɜ, ˈlæːtɜ], bit [bɪt], dish [dis, diʃ], ship [ʃɪp, skɪp, sxɪp], pull [pʊl], good [ɡou̯t, ɣɑu̯t, ɣuːt], clock [klɔk], sail [sɑi̯l], he [hɛi̯, hɑi̯, hi(j)], storm [stoːrm], wind [vɪˑnt], grass [ɡras, ɣras], hold [hoˑʊl(t)], old [oˑʊl(t)].

The table below shows the relationship between Low German consonants which were unaffected by this chain shift and their equivalents in other West Germanic languages. Contemporary Swedish and Icelandic shown for comparison; Eastern and Western North Germanic languages, respectively.

Proto-Germanic	Northern Low German	High German	Northern Low German	High German	Dutch	English	Swedish	Icelandic
-k-	-k-	-ch- (/x/)	maken	machen	maken	make	maka (arch.)	
k-	k-	k-	Keerl (Kerl) (fellow)	Kerl (Note: High German Kerl is a loanword from Low German.)	kerel	churl	karl	karl
d-	d-	t-	Dag	Tag	dag	day	dag	dagur
-t-	-t-	-ss- (/s/)	eten (ȩten, äten) [Westphalian: iäten]	essen	eten	eat	äta	eta
t-	t-	z- (/t͡s/)	teihn (tein)	zehn	tien	ten	tio	tíu
-tt-	-tt-	-tz-, -z- (/t͡s/)	sitten	sitzen	zitten	sit	sitta	sitja
-p	-p, -pp	-f, -ff	Schipp, Schepp, Schüpp and Skipp	Schiff	schip	ship	skepp (Note: Pronounced shepp since the 17th century.)	skip
p-	p-	pf-	Peper	Pfeffer	peper	pepper	peppar	pipar
-β-	-w, -f; -w-, -v-, -b-	-b-	Wiew, Wiewer; Wief, Wiewer; Wief, Wiever; Wief, Wieber	Weib, Weiber (Note: The series Wief–wijf, etc. are cognates, not semantic equivalents. The meanings of some of these words have shifted over time. For example, the correct equivalent term for "wife" in modern Dutch, German and Swedish is vrouw, Frau and fru respectively; using wijf, Weib or viv for a human is considered archaic in Swedish and nowadays derogatory in Dutch and German, comparable to "wicked girl". No cognate to Frau / vrouw / fru has survived in English (compare Old English frōwe "lady"; the English word frow "woman, lady" rather being a borrowing of the Middle Dutch word).)	wijf, wijven	wife, wives	viv	víf

=== Ingvaeonisms ===
Like English and Frisian, Low German is often recognized as a North Sea Germanic language and therefore has so-called Ingvaeonisms. However, these are not distributed equally regionally everywhere. Some dialects have more and others fewer of these features, while some only occur in older forms of language and only leave relics in modern Low German.

Cases that do not follow the rules described in the first column are in bold.

Ingvaonic development		Low German (different dialects)	English	West Frisian	Dutch	German	
Nasal-Spirant-Law		küüt	could	koed	geku**n**d	geko**nn**t	
Nasal-Spirant-Law		us	us	ús	o**n**s	u**n**s	
Nasal-Spirant-Law		wöösken	to wish	wi**n**skje	we**n**sen	wü**n**schen	
Nasal-Spirant-Law		Goos ~ Gans	goose	goes	ga**n**s	Ga**n**s	
Nasal-Spirant-Law		niegede	ni**n**th	njogge**n**de	nege**n**de	neu**n**te	
Nasal-Spirant-Law		toeggede	te**n**th	tsie**n**de	tie**n**de	zeh**n**te	
Nasal-Spirant-Law		fiewe	five	fif	vijf	fü**n**f	
Nasal-Spirant-Law		määske	—	mi**n**ske	me**n**s	Me**n**sch	
R-Metathesis		däärde	third	t**re**dde	derde	d**ri**tter	
R-Metathesis		dartehn	thirteen	t**re**ttjin	dertien	d**rei**zehn	
R-Metathesis		dörtig, dartig ~ drüttig	thirty	t**ri**tich	dertig	d**rei**ßig	
R-Metathesis		Borst	b**rea**st	boarst	borst	B**ru**st	
R-Metathesis		forsk	f**ro**sk	f**ro**ask	kikvors	F**ro**sch	
R-Metathesis		Born	bourn	boarne	b**ro**n	B**ru**nnen	
Loss of person distinctions in plural forms of verbs		wi doot	OE: wē dōþ	wy dogge	wij doen	wir tun	
Loss of person distinctions in plural forms of verbs		ji doot	OE: ġē dōþ	jim dogge	julie doen	**ihr tut**	
Loss of person distinctions in plural forms of verbs		ji doot	OE: ġē dōþ	jim dogge	**jij doet**	**ihr tut**	
Loss of person distinctions in plural forms of verbs		se doot	OE: hīe dōþ	sy dogge	zij doen	sie tun	
No "t" in 3rd p. sg. of "to be"		is ~ es	is	is	is	is**t**	
No "r" in 1st p. pl. pronoun		wi	we	wy	wij	wi**r**	
Future tense formation with the auxiliary verb "shall"		schallen/sallen	shall	sille	zullen	**werden**	
Dative and accusative merged into an objective case		mi	me	my	mij	mich	mir
Dative and accusative merged into an objective case		di	you (thee)	dy	jou	dich	dir
Dative and accusative merged into an objective case		hüm	him	him	hem	ihn	ihm
Dative and accusative merged into an objective case		hör	her	har	haar	sie	ihr
Dative and accusative merged into an objective case		dat	it	it	het	es	ihm
Dative and accusative merged into an objective case		u(n)s	us	ús	ons	uns	uns
Dative and accusative merged into an objective case		jo	you	jo	jullie	euch	euch
Dative and accusative merged into an objective case		hör	them	harren	hen ~ hun	sie	ihnen
Using other personal pronouns		he	he	hy	hij	**er**	
Using other personal pronouns		ji	you	jim	jullie	**ihr**	
No ge- prefix		maakt	made	makke	**ge**maakt	**ge**macht	
No ge- prefix		daon	done	dien	**ge**daan	**ge**tan	
No ge- prefix		sehn	seen	sjoen	**ge**zien	**ge**sehen	
No ge- prefix		gaone	gone	gien	**ge**gaan	**ge**gangen	
No ge- prefix		lääsen, leest	read	lêzen	**ge**lezen	**ge**lesen	
Assibilization or palatalization of velar consonants		OS: kiennan	OE: **c**unnan	**k**enne	**k**ennen	**k**ennen	
Assibilization or palatalization of velar consonants		OS: kiesur	OE: **c**aser	**k**eizer	**k**eizer	**K**aiser	
Assibilization or palatalization of velar consonants		MLG: zint	child	—	**K**ind	**K**ind	
Assibilization or palatalization of velar consonants		NLG: Sebber/Sever	OE: ċeafor	—	**k**ever	**K**äfer	
Assibilization or palatalization of velar consonants		OS: ieldan	yield	jild	**g**eld	**G**eld	
Palatalization of Germanic "a"		OS: therf	OE: thearf	?	?	d**a**rf	
Palatalization of Germanic "a"		OS: deg	day OE: dæg	dei	d**a**g	T**a**g	
Palatalization of Germanic "a"		OS: gles	glas OE: glæs	glês	gl**a**s	Gl**a**s	
Loss of the reflexive pronoun in the 3rd person	sg. m.	**sik** um (e.g. in Vriezenveen)	himself	him	**zich**	**sich**	
Loss of the reflexive pronoun in the 3rd person	sg. f.	**sik**, eer (e.g. in Vriezenveen)	herself	har	**zich**	**sich**	
Loss of the reflexive pronoun in the 3rd person	plural	**sik** eer (e.g. in Vriezenveen)	themselves	harren	**zich**	**sich**	

=== Other changes ===
In addition, there are of course numerous other changes that are not related to Ingwaonic phenomena, but that arose in exchange with other languages or something else. The table below reflects some of these developments insofar as they affect several dialects and are therefore not exceptional phenomena.

Sound change	German	West Frisian	Dutch	Low German	Swedish	English
ks → ss	wachsen	waa**ks**e	wassen	wassen	vä**x**a	wa**x** (to grow)
ks → ss	Fu**chs**	vo**ks**	vos	Voss	fu**x**	fo**x**
ks → ss	O**chs**e	o**ks**e	os	Oss(e)	o**x**e	o**x**
ks → ss	se**chs**	seis	zes	sess	se**x**	si**x**
ks → ss	Wa**chs**	waa**ks**	was	Wass	va**x**	wa**x**
Loss of intervocalic /d/ cluster	alt - äl**t**er	âld- âl**d**er	oud - ou**d**er	oolt - öller	gammal - äl**d**re	old - ol**d**er
Loss of intervocalic /d/ cluster	kalt - käl**t**er	kâld - kâl**d**er	koud - kou**d**er	koolt - köller	kallt - kallare	cold - col**d**er
Loss of intervocalic /d/ cluster	wild - wil**d**er	wyld - wyl**d**er	wild - wil**d**er	wild - willer	vild - vil**d**are	wild- wil**d**er
Loss of intervocalic /d/ cluster	un**t**er	ûn**d**er	on**d**er	ünner	un**d**er	un**d**er
Loss of intervocalic /d/ cluster	Schul**t**er	skou**d**er	schou**d**er	Schuller	skul**d**ra	shoul**d**er

== Grammar ==
Generally speaking, Low German grammar shows similarities with the grammars of Dutch, Frisian, English, and Scots, but the dialects of Northern Germany share some features (especially lexical and syntactic features) with German dialects.

=== Personal pronouns ===
The following table tries to reflect the linguistic situation of the individual dialects as diverse as possible and to name as many case forms of the respective pronouns, but it is not able to do justice to every dialect. So the pronoun of the third person singular feminine can be pronounced as follows: se(e), sey, soi, etc. Only one of these variants can be found in the table. This also applies to all other pronouns.

Personal pronouns
Case	1st person		2nd person		3rd person			
Case	Singular	Plural	Singular	Plural	Singular			Plural
Case	Singular	Plural	Singular	Plural	Masculine	Neuter	Feminine	Plural
Nominative	ik(ke) ek(ke)	wy	du (j)y	(j)y/ (j)it	he	it/(h)et/öt dat/det	se/ he (just in Twente used)	se/ süm
Accusative/Objective	my/ mik/mek	u(n)s/üsk	dy/ dik/dek/ ju	(j)u(ch)/jük/ ink/ jem/jüm	iänne/öne/ (h)em/hüm/him	it/(h)et/öt dat/det	(h)er/(h)ör/ se	jem/jüm/ (h)er/(h)ör/ se/ süm
Dative (Assinghausen)	mey	us	dey	uch	iämme	iämme	iär	iänne

=== Verbs ===
In Low German verbs are conjugated for person, number, and tense. There are five tenses in Low German: present tense, preterite, perfect, and pluperfect, and in Mennonite Low German the present perfect which signifies a remaining effect from a past finished action. For example, "Ekj sie jekomen", "I am come", means that the speaker came and he is still at the place to which he came as a result of his completed action.

Unlike Dutch, High German, and southern Low German, the northern dialects form the past participle without the prefix ge-, like the Scandinavian languages, Frisian and English. Compare northern Low German slapen to the German past participle geschlafen. This past participle is used with the auxiliary verbs hewwen/hebben "to have" and wesen/sin/sien "to be". When the past participle ends with -en or in a few oft-used words like west (been).

Northern Low German conjugation examples
verbs				breken, "to break"	tehn"to pull"	doon, "to do"	gahn, "to go"	helpen, "to help"	snacken, "to speak"	willen, "to want/ to become"	kamen, "to come"	holen, "to carry"	schre'en, "to shout"	schellen, "to scold"	beschrieven, "to describe"	waschen, "to wash"
Infinitive				breken	tehn	doon	gahn	helpen	snacken	willen	kamen	holen	schre'en	schellen	beschrieven	waschen
Participle	Present			breken	tehn	doon	gahn	helpen	snacken	willen	kamen	holen	schre'en	schellen	beschrieven	waschen
Participle	Past			braken	tagen	dahn	gahn	hulpen	snackt	wullt	kamen	holen	schreet	schlellt	beschreven	wuschen
Indicative	Present	Singular	1st person	breek	teh	do	gah	help	snack	will	kaam	hool	schree	schell	beschriev	wasch
Indicative	Present	Singular	2nd person	brickst	tühst	deist	geihst	helpst	snackst	willst	kummst	höllst	schreest	schellst	beschriffst	waschst
Indicative	Present	Singular	3rd person	brickt	tüht	deit	geiht	helpt	snackt	will	kummt	höllt	schreet	schellt	beschrifft	wascht
Indicative	Present	Plural		breekt	teht	doon	gaht	helpt	snackt	wölt	kaamt	hoolt	schreet	schellt	beschrievt	wascht
Indicative	Past	Singular	1st person	bröök	töög	deed	güng	hölp	snack	wull	keem	höölen	schree	schell	beschreev	wüsch
Indicative	Past	Singular	2nd person	bröökst	töögst	deedst	güngst	hölpst	snackst	wullst	keemst	höölst	schreest	schellst	beschreevst	wüschst
Indicative	Past	Singular	3rd person	bröök	töög	deed	güng	hölp	snack	wull	keem	hööl	schree	schell	beschreev	wüsch
Indicative	Past	Plural		bröken	tögen	deden	güngen	hölpen	snacken	wullen	kemen	hölen	schreen	schellen	beschreven	wüschen
Imperative		Singular		breek	teh	do	gah	help	snack	will	kaam	hool	schree	schell	beschriev	wasch
Imperative		Plural		breekt	teht	doot	gaht	helpt	snackt	wöölt	kamt	hoolt	schreet	schellt	beschrievt	wascht

Synthetic subjunctive verb forms are mostly identical to the indicative forms of the past tense and the pluperfect tense - much like Dutch and English. It is thus only recognizable from the context of a sentence. It is often formed periphrastically by using the helping verbs woor, schull, wull, and dee: "Ik woor/wöör/worr/wurr mi freuen, wenn Vader noch lang leev" (I would be glad if father still lived for a long time).

	Low German subjunctive 1/ English reported speech		Low German subjunctive 2	
	Low German subjunctive 1/ English reported speech		English Conditional 2	English Conditional 3
Low German	He see to mi, he kaam nu.	He see to mi, he harr al eten.	Weer ik riek, deed ik ju en Pony köpen,	Harr ik de tied hat, harr ik ju hulpen.
English	He said to me, he came now.	He said to me, he had already eaten.	If I were rich, I would buy you a Pony.	If I had had the time, I would have helped you.

There is also a progressive form of verbs in present, corresponding to the same in the Dutch language. It is formed with wesen (to be), the preposition an (at) and dat (the/it).

	Low German	Dutch	English
Main form	Ik bün an't Maken.	Ik ben aan het maken.	I am making.
Main form 2	Ik do maken.^{1}	–	–
Alternative form	Ik bün an'n Maken.^{2}	Ik ben aan het maken.	–
Alternative form 2	Ik bün maken.^{3}	Ik ben makende.	I am making.

^{1} Instead of wesen, sien (to be) Saxon uses doon (to do) to make to present continuous.
^{2} Many see the 'n as an old dative ending of dat which only occurs when being shortened after prepositions. This is actually the most frequently-used form in colloquial Low German.
^{3} This form is archaic and mostly unknown to Low German speakers. It is the same pattern as in the English example "I am making." The present participle has the same form as the infinitive: maken is either "to make" or "making".

=== Adjectives ===
The forms of Low German's adjectives are distinct from other closely related languages such as German and English. These forms fall somewhere in between these two languages. As in German, the adjectives in Low German may make a distinction between singular and plural to agree with the nouns that they modify, as well as between the three genders, between the nominative and oblique cases and between indefinite (weak) and definite (strong) forms. However, there is a lot of variation in that respect and some or all of these distinctions may also be absent, so that a single undeclined form of the adjective can occur in all cases, as in English. This is especially common in the neuter. If the adjective is declined, the pattern tends to be as follows:

Gender		Nominative	Oblique	Gloss
Masculine	indefinite singular	en starke(n) Kerl	en(en) starke(n) Kerl	'a strong man'
	indefinite plural	starke Kerls	starke Kerls	'strong men'
	definite singular	de starke Kerl	den starken Kerl	'the strong man'
	definite plural	de starken Kerls	de starken Kerls	'the strong men'
Feminine	indefinite singular	en(e) smucke Deern	en(e) smucke Deern	'a pretty girl'
	indefinite plural	smucke Deerns	smucke Deerns	'pretty girls'
	definite singular	de smucke Deern	de smucke Deern	'the pretty girl'
	definite plural	de smucken Deerns	de smucken Deerns	'the pretty girls'
Neuter	indefinite singular	en lütt((e)t) Land	en lütt((e)t) Land	'a little country'
	indefinite plural	lütt Lannen	lütt Lannen	'little countries'
	definite singular	dat lütte Land	dat lütte Land	'the little country'
	definite plural	de lütten Lannen	de lütten Lannen	'the little countries'

As mentioned above, alternative undeclined forms such as dat lütt Land, de lütt Lannen, en stark Kerl, de stark Kerl, stark Kerls, de stark Kerls etc. can occur.

== Phonology ==
=== Consonants ===
		Labial	Alveolar	Post- alveolar	Palatal	Velar/ Uvular	Glottal
Stop	voiceless	p	t	(tʃ)		k	
Stop	voiced	b	d			ɡ	
Fricative	voiceless	f	s	ʃ	(ç)	x	h
Fricative	voiced	v	z	(ʒ)		(ɣ)	
Nasal		m	n			ŋ	
Trill			r			(ʀ)	
Approximant	lateral		l				
Approximant	plain				j		

- A common feature of Low German dialects is the retraction of /s z/ to [s̠ z̠].
- The sound [ɣ] can occur as an allophone of /ɡ/ among dialects.
- /r/ and /x/ can have allophones as [ɾ] and [ç].
- /r/ can be articulated as uvular [ʀ] among Northern dialects and younger speakers.
- The sound /j/ can also be realized as fricative or affricate sounds [ʝ~ʑ~ʒ], [dʒ], in word-initial position.

=== Vowels ===
	Front				Central		Back	
	unrounded		rounded		Central		Back	
	short	long	short	long	short	long	short	long
Close	ɪ	iː	ʏ	yː			ʊ	uː
Close-mid		eː		øː	ə			oː
Open-mid	ɛ	ɛː	œ	œː	(ɐ)		ɔ	ɔː
Open					a	aː	(ɑ)	(ɒː)

- [ɒ] and [ɐ] can occur as allophones of /a/ and /r/.
- Vowel backness of /a/ to [ɑ] may also occur among dialects.

Diphthongs
	-i	-ɪ	-y	-u	-ʊ	-ɛ	-ə	-ɔ	-a
i-						iɛ	iə		ia
u-						uɛ		uɔ	ua
e-	eˑi	ɛɪ							ea
ø-	øˑi	œɪ							(øa)
o-	ɔˑi		ɔˑy	oˑu	ɔʊ				
a-	aˑi	aˑɪ		aˑu	aˑʊ				

- [ɑ] can be heard as an allophone of /a/ within diphthongs.
- Long phonemes /eː/, /øː/, /oː/, occur mostly in the Geest dialects, while in other dialects, they may be realized as diphthongs.

== Writing system ==
Low German is written using the Latin alphabet. There is no official standard orthography, though there are several locally more or less accepted orthographic guidelines. Those in the Netherlands are mostly based on Dutch orthography and may vary per dialect region, and those in Germany mostly follow German orthography. To the latter group belongs the orthography devised by Johannes Sass. It is mostly used by modern official publications and internet sites, especially the Low German Wikipedia. This diversity, a result of centuries of official neglect and suppression, has a very fragmenting and thus weakening effect on the language as a whole, since it has created barriers that do not exist on the spoken level. This severely hampers interregional and interdialectal written communication. Most of these systems aim at representing the phonetic (allophonic) output rather than underlying (phonemic) representations.

A commonly voiced idea on both sides of the border on the topic of spelling is 'Write it as you say it', which results in semi-phonetic spellings based on either German or Dutch spelling conventions. This seriously affects international legibility, as pronunciation can vary wildly, resulting in many different written forms of what are essentially the same words. An attempt to unify the dialects in spelling was created by Reinhard Franz Hahn, a German-American linguist. He created the Algemeyne Schryvwys on etymological principles. He however restricted his spelling's focus mostly to the northern German dialects. A group of enthusiasts from both sides of the border took his principles and expanded them for the majority of the Low German dialects in both the Netherlands and Germany. This reworked version is called the Nysassiske Skryvwyse (New Saxon Spelling).

== Spoken examples ==
Holsteinisch dialect

Holsteinisch dialect

Holsteinisch dialect

Southern Westphalian

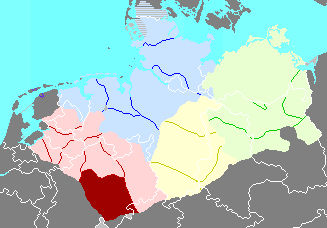

East Westphalian

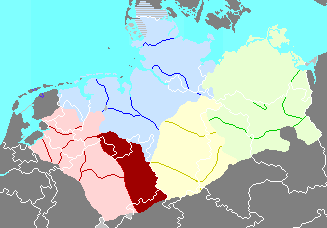

East Westphalian

East Frisian Low German

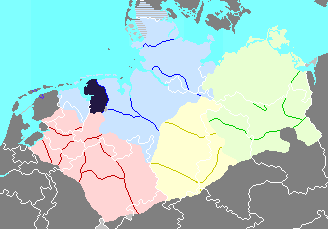

East Frisian Low German

East Frisian Low German

East - Pomeranian

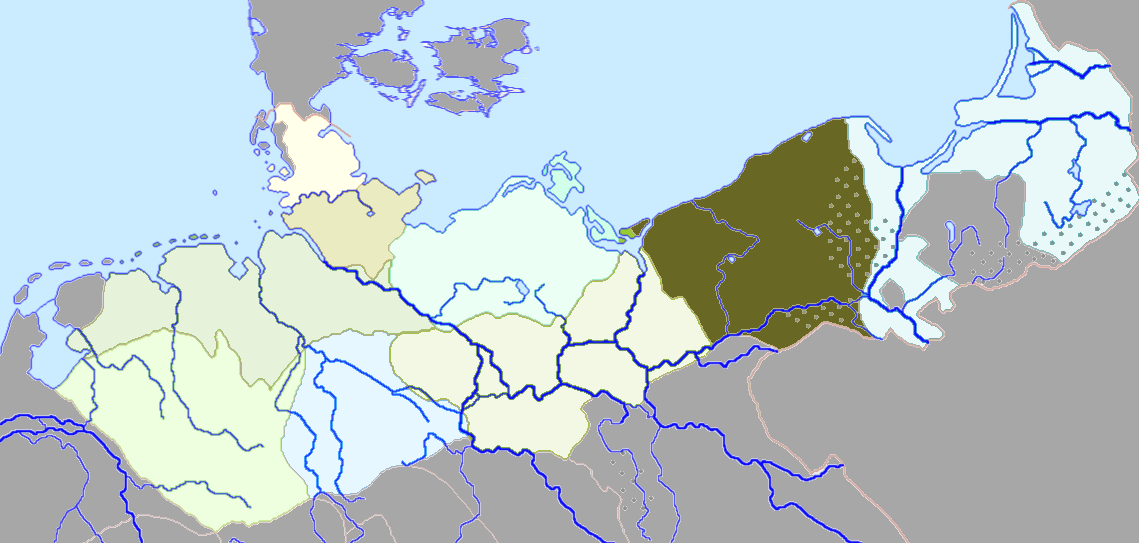

East Pomeranian

East Pomeranian

East Pomeranian

Plautdietsch

Plautdietsch

Plautdietsch

== Notable Low German writers and performers ==
- Heinrich Bandlow
- Hans-Friedrich Blunck
- John Brinckman
- De fofftig Penns
- Gorch Fock
- Friedrich Wilhelm Grimme (Westphalian: Sauerländisch)
- Klaus Groth (Dithmarsisch)
- August Hermann
- Joachim Mähl
- Johann Meyer (Dithmarsisch)
- Martha Müller-Grählert
- Fritz Reuter (Mecklenburgisch-Vorpommersch)
- Willem Schröder
- Julius Stinde
- Rudolf Tarnow
- Augustin Wibbelt (Westphalian: Münsterländisch)
- Wilhelm Wieben
- Hans-Jürgen Massaquoi
- Normaal
- Daniël Lohues

Middle Low German authors:

- Eggerik Beninga
- Balthasar Russow
- Albert Suho

Plautdietsch authors:

- Arnold Dyck
- Reuben Epp
- Jack Thiessen

== Low German in education, media and culture ==
As an important identity-forming element, the Low German language has been taught in schools in northern Germany for several years. In 2023, for example, the first class in Mecklenburg-Western Pomerania graduated in the subject Low German. The social position of Low German has improved significantly in recent years and enjoys a high level of prestige, especially in modern cities such as Hamburg and Bremen.

Numerous formats in Low German are also offered on Norddeutscher Rundfunk.

The television moderator Yared Dibaba has been campaigning for the preservation of Low German languages for years.

The internet magazine Wearldspråke (alternatively also: Wearldsproake) is run by the musician and language activist Martin ter Denge.

In 2020 the film "The Marriage Escape" was released, which is mostly in Tweants.

Linguistically, historically and culturally there are close contacts with the Netherlands, Denmark and other predominantly Protestant inhabitants of the North and Baltic Seas such as Great Britain, the rest of Scandinavia and the Baltic states. In German usage, for example on Norddeutscher Rundfunk, northern Germany is occasionally viewed as part of Northern Europe, while the remaining part of Germany is less questioned as belonging to Central Europe.

Historically, close relationships also existed in the field of literature and poetry, for example the Norwegian Thidrekssaga (13th century) is based, according to its own information, on "Low German" and "Saxon" templates.

However, there are numerous other cultural and historical features that are common to the entire Low German-speaking area, such as the special architectural style of the "Low German hall house". These houses are often provided with traditional gable decorations, which are also known under the terms 'Hengst' and 'Hors'. Rudolf Simek notes that these horse-head gables can still be seen today, and says that the horse-head gables confirm that Hengist and Horsa were originally considered mythological, horse-shaped beings.

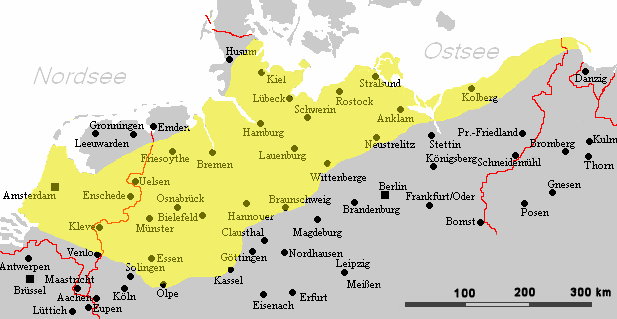
Spread of Low German Houses

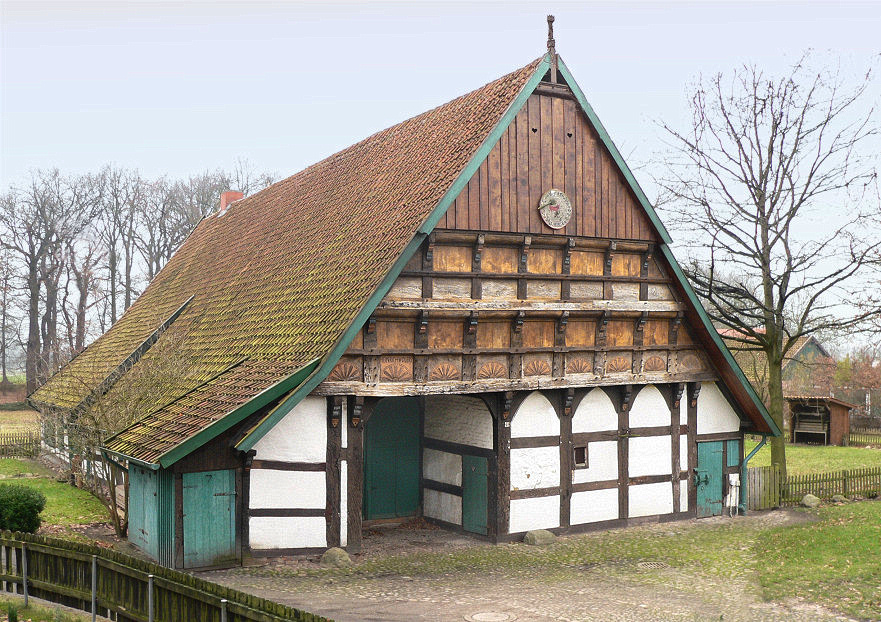
Low German House in Insernhagen

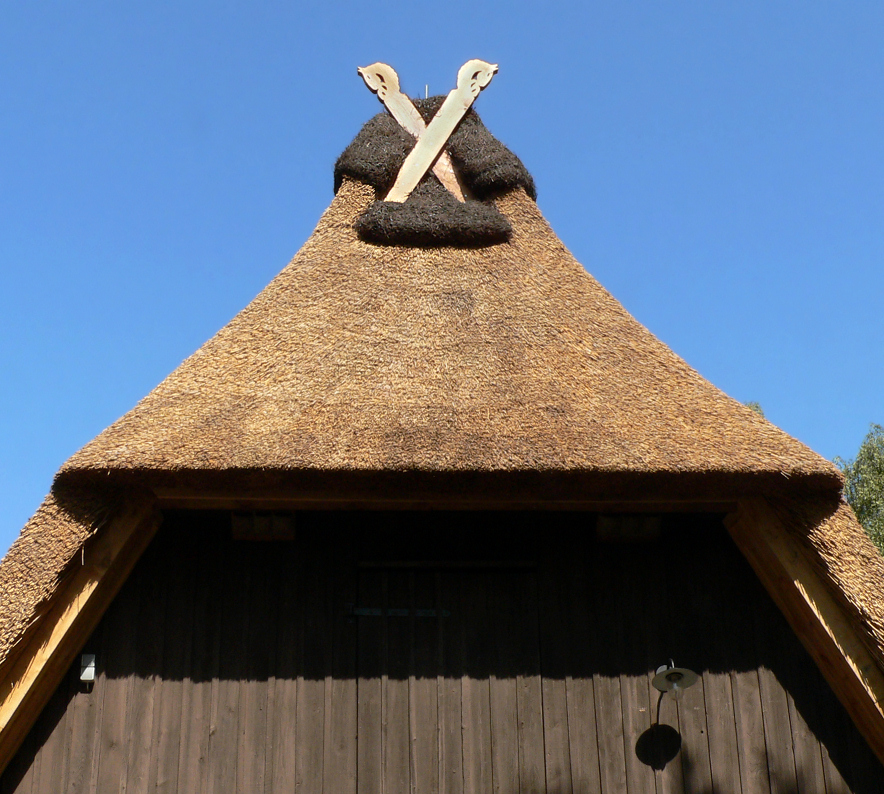
Gable jewelry

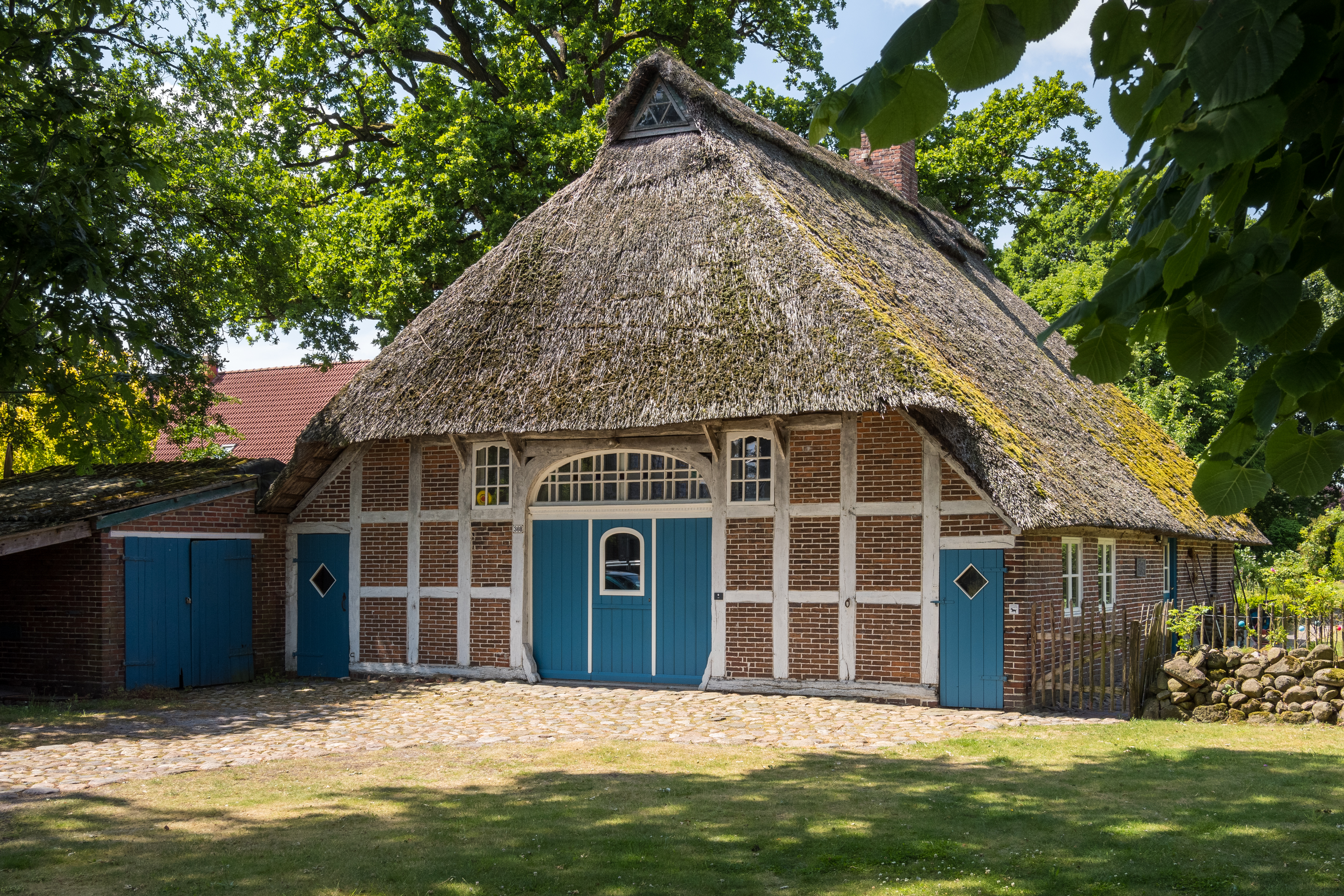
Low German House in Rastede

Since the Brothers Grimm were friends with the von Haxterhausen family, numerous fairy tales by the Grimm children and household tales come from the Westphalian and thus Low German cultural area. However, there are a remarkable number of Grimm's fairy tales that are written in Low German in their original version.

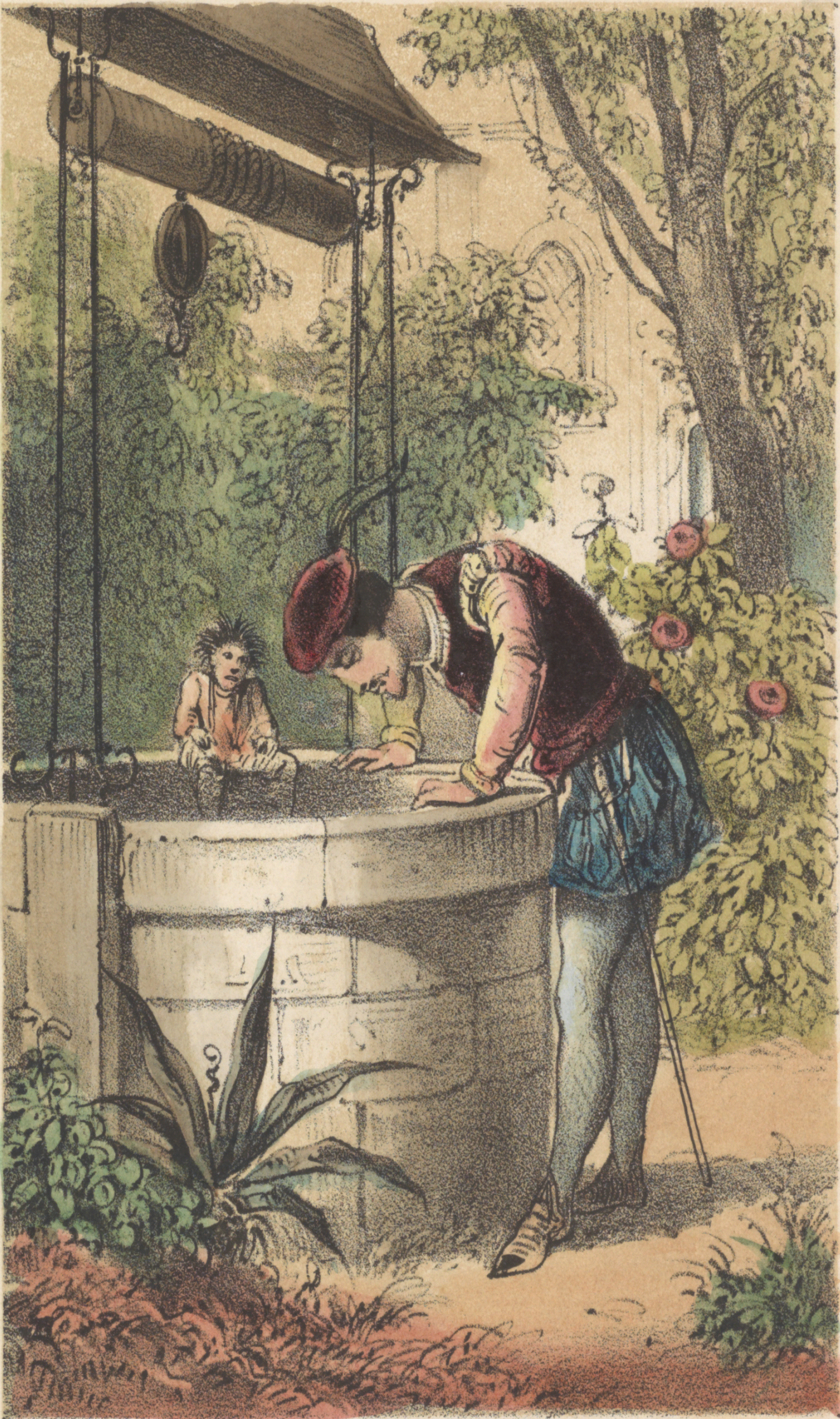
Dat Erdmänneken (The Gnome)

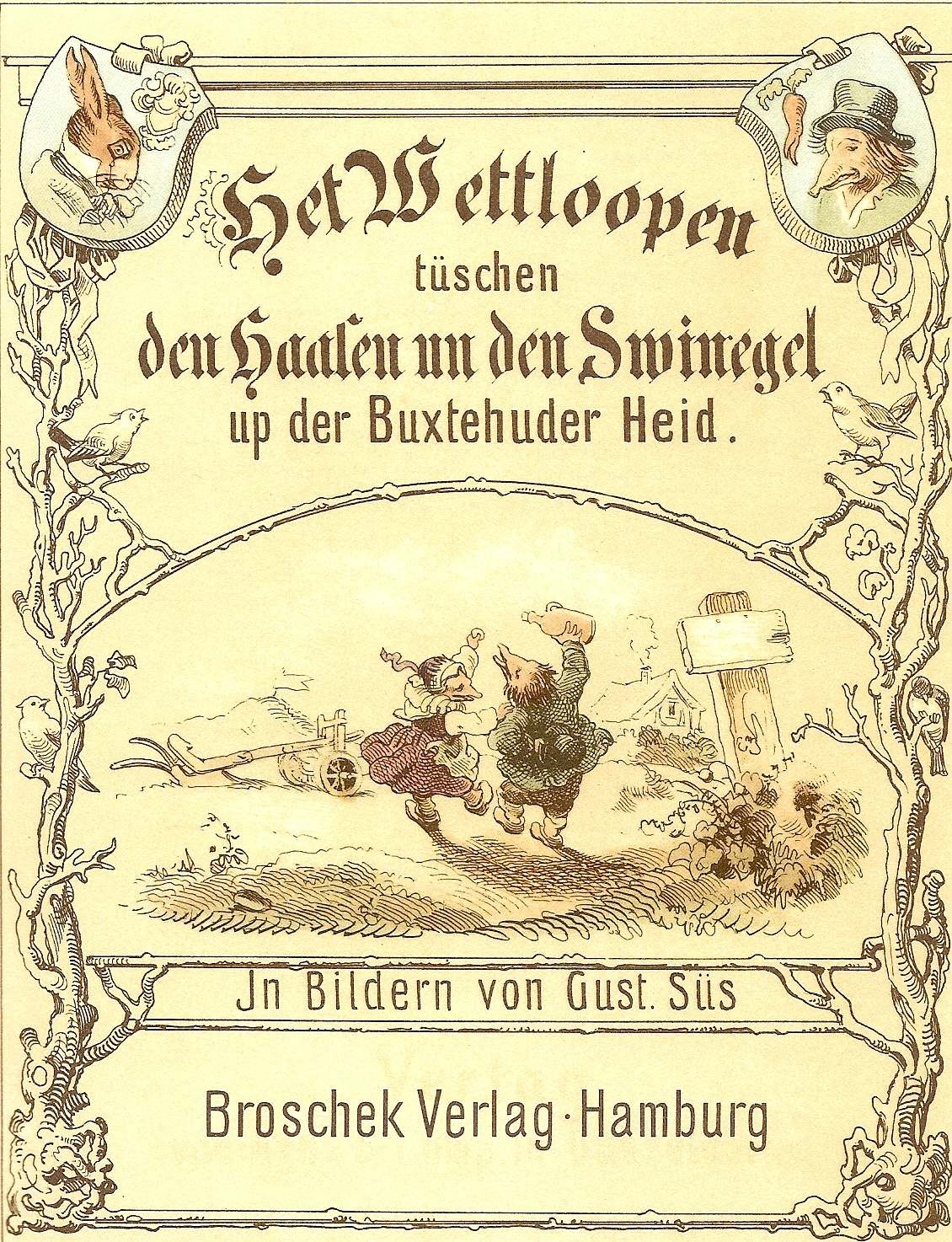
Dat Wettlopen twischen den Hasen un den Swinegel up de lütje Heide bi Buxtehude (The race between the Hare and the hedgehog)

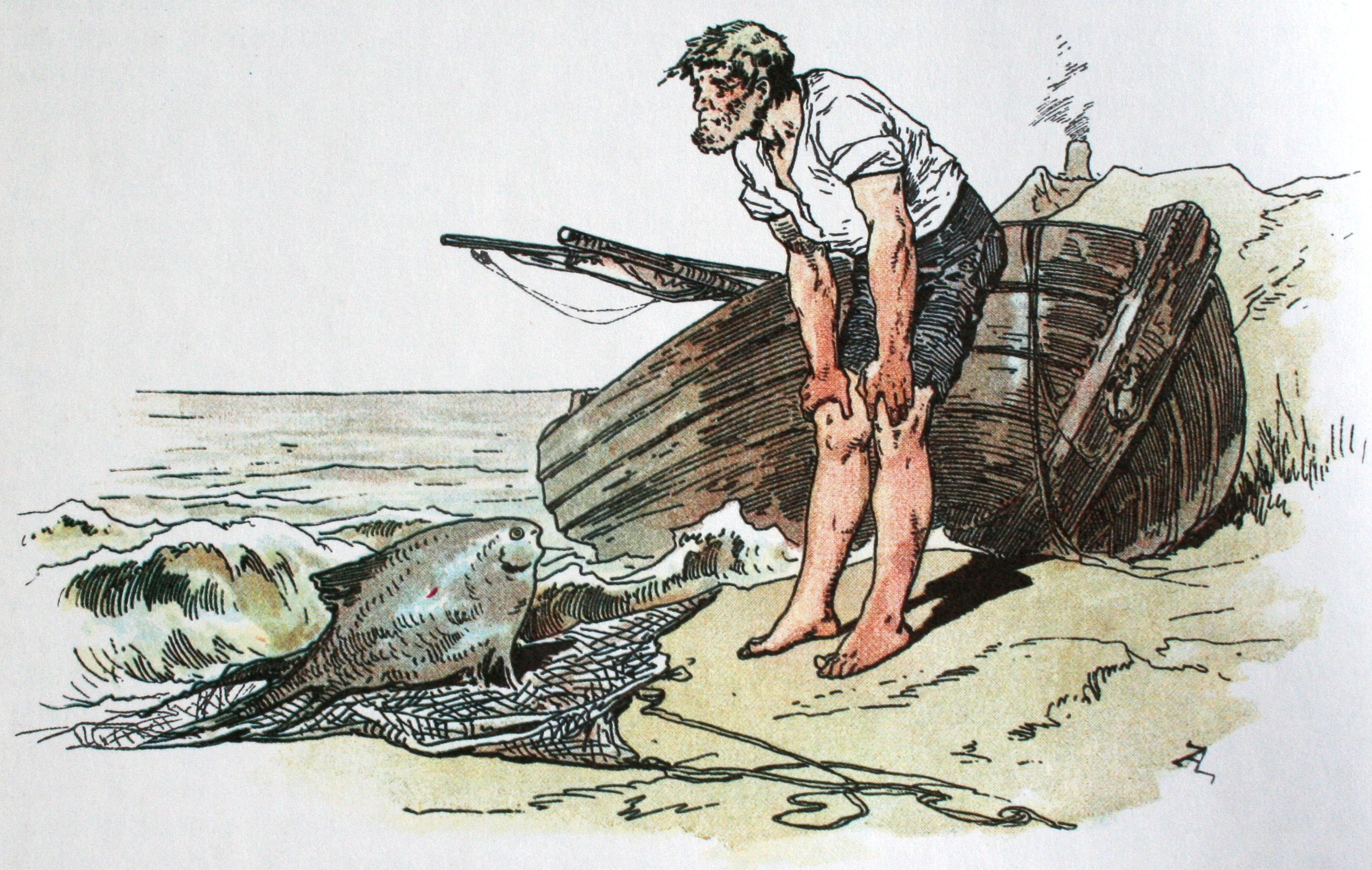
Von den Fischer und siine Fru (The Fisherman and his wife)

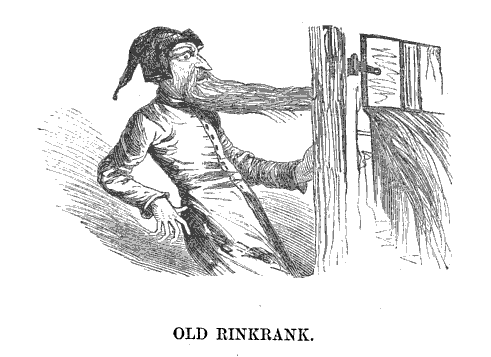
Oll Rinkrank (Old Rinkrank)

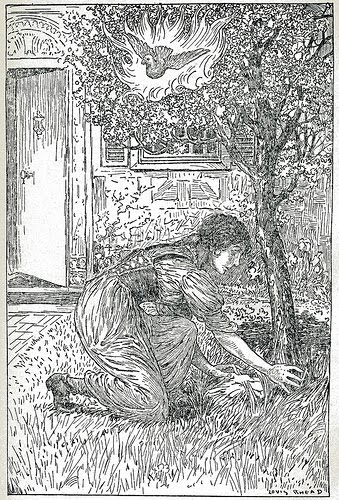
Van den Machandelboom (The Juniper Tree)

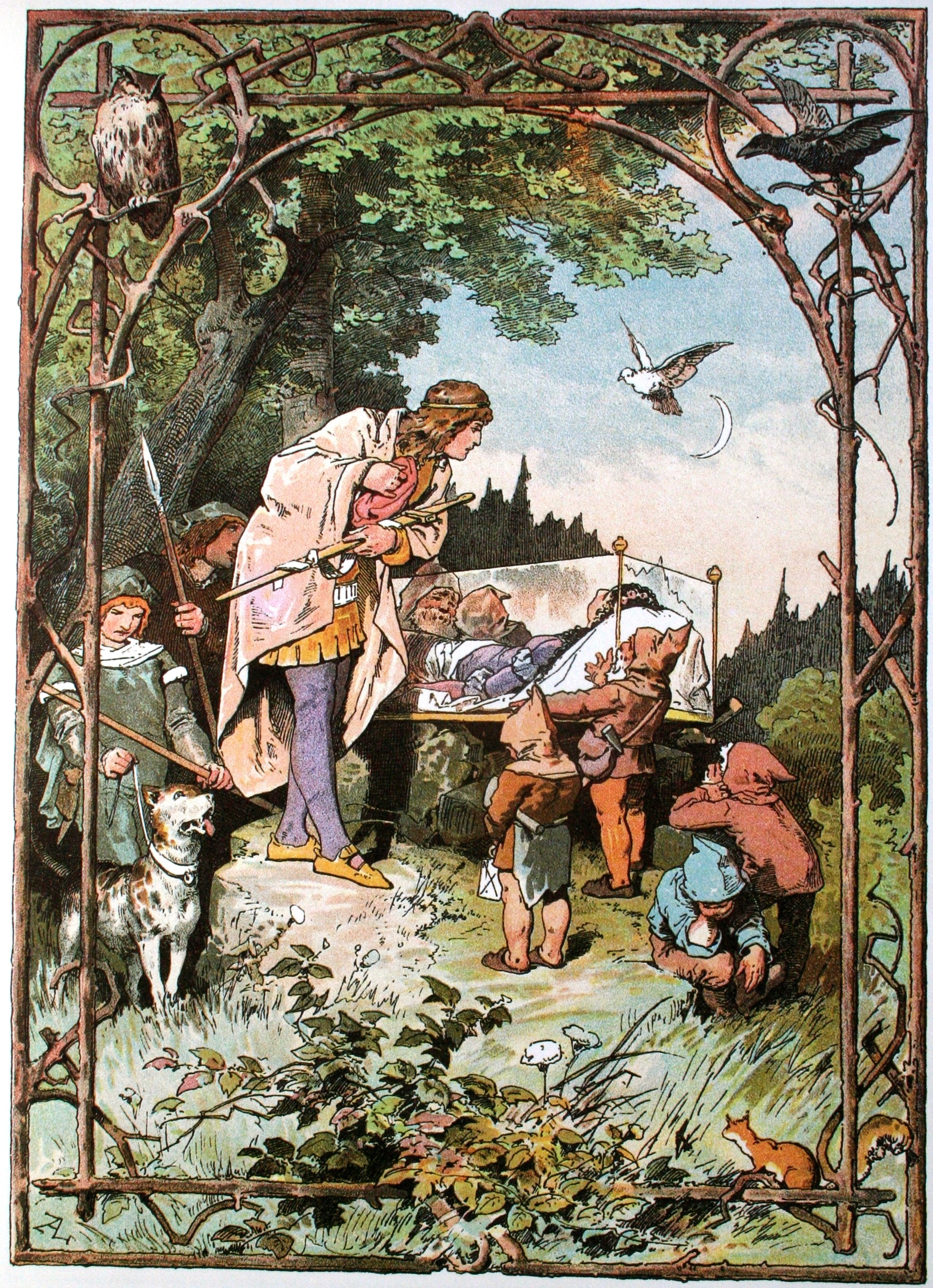
Sneewittchen (Snow White)(just its name stems from Low German)

== See also ==
- 1614 Low German Bible
- Bible translations into German
- Friar Rush
- Hamborger Veermaster
- The Juniper Tree (fairy tale)
- Low German (school subject)
- Meuse-Rhenish
- Moin
- Ohnsorg-Theater
- Masurian dialects

== Bibliography ==
- Adams, Douglas Q. (1975), "The Distribution of Retracted Sibilants in Medieval Europe", Language, 51 (2), Linguistic Society of America: 282–292, doi:10.2307/412855, JSTOR 412855
- Lasch, Agathe (1914). Mittelniederdeutsche Grammatik (in German). Halle (Saale): Max Niemeyer Verlag. ASIN B00416B8PU. LCCN 15008211. OCLC 3145389. OL 6575768M. Wikidata Q131355367.
- Simek, Rudolf (2007). n.t.
