= Veluws dialect =

Dutch dialect of Low German

Veluws
- Veluwe
- Veluws
- Native to: Netherlands
- Native speakers: 175,000 (2009)
- Language family: Indo-European: Germanic; West Germanic; North Sea Germanic; Low Franconian / Low German, more specifically Dutch Low Saxon; Veluws
- Dialects: Oost-Veluws; West-Veluws

Official status
- Official language in: Netherlands Recognized in 1996 (as being part of Low Saxon).

Language codes
- ISO 639-3: vel
- Glottolog: velu1238
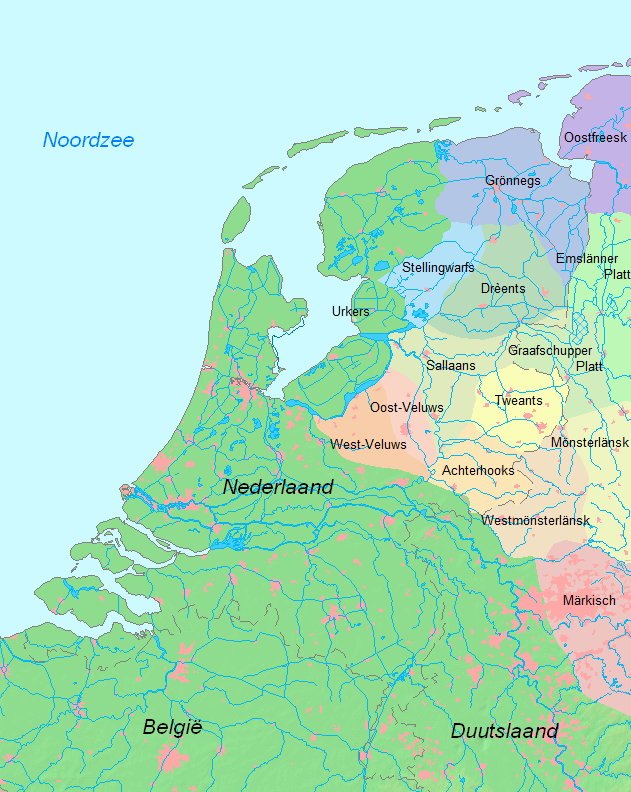
- Geographical location of Veluws (Oost-Veluws and West-Veluws) among the other minority and regional languages and dialects of the Benelux countries

Veluws is a dialect or an umbrella term for dialects which are spoken in Veluwe, in the northwest of Gelderland, in central Netherlands.

== Dialects ==
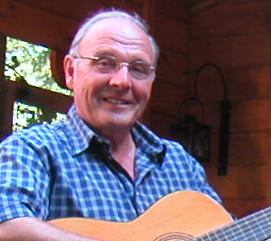
Frans Nieuwenhuis (born 1936) sings in the Veluws dialect.

Veluws is usually divided into two main dialects, West-Veluws and Oost-Veluws (East Veluws), these two dialects are reasonably similar but differ in grammar. For example: in Oost-Veluws it is said ie warkt/wärkt ('you are working') and in West-Veluws jie warken/waarken ('you are working').

West-Veluws has more influence from Dutch. Typically the closer one gets to the border with Oost-Veluws, the more the dialects differ from Standard Dutch. For example, in the central part where West-Veluws is spoken hie staot ('he is standing'); in the northwestern part the corresponding phrase sounds hij steet, compared to hij/hee stiet in Oost-Veluws. The latter has more Low Saxon influence. In Hattem, the northeastern part where Oost-Veluws is spoken, it has more Sallandic influences.

Westveluws is classified as Low Franconian (Nederfrankisch), more specifically as belonging to Hollands-Frankisch, while Oostveluws is Low Saxon (Saksisch). In another classification, the dialects in the South and West of Veluwe (together with e.g. North Holland and Utrecht) belong to the Central Dutch varieties and are Low Franconian, while the North and East of Veluwe (together with e.g. Salland) is part of Overijssel and belong to Low Saxon. In another terminology, Veluws is the dialect of the West, South and Center of Veluwe (Low Franconian) and Sallands is the dialect in a small part in the North and the East of Veluwe and Salland (Low Saxon).

== See also ==
- West-Veluws dialect
- Oost-Veluws dialect
