= Sallaans dialect =

Dialects of Salland region

Sallaans
- Native to: Netherlands
- Native speakers: 350,000 (2009)
- Language family: Indo-European: Germanic; West Germanic; North Sea Germanic; Low Saxon; Westphalian; Gelders-Overijssels; Sallaans

Language codes
- ISO 639-3: sdz
- Glottolog: sall1238

Sallaans (Dutch: Sallands; Low Saxon: Sallaands) is a collective term for the Westphalian dialects of the region Salland, in the province of Overijssel, as well as in minor parts of Gelderland and Drenthe in the Eastern Netherlands, and a small part in the North and the East of Veluwe. In the Kop van Overijssel, the Stellingwarfs dialect is spoken.

A common term used by native speakers for their dialect, which is also used by Low Saxon speakers from other regions for their respective dialects, is plat or simply dialect. Yet another common usage is to refer to the language by the name of the local variety, where for instance Dal(f)sens would be the name for the Sallaans variety spoken in the village of Dalfsen. Sallands is more influenced by the Hollandic dialects than Twents or Achterhoeks. This influence is known as the Hollandse expansie. For example, the word 'house' (Standard Dutch huis [ɦœys]) is hoes [ɦuːs] in Twents but huus [ɦyːs] in Sallaans. The Hollandic dialects of the 17th century still had not diphthongized [yː] to [œy], and due to their prestigious status they triggered the shift from [uː] to [yː].

== Phonology ==
=== Consonants ===
Consonants in the dialect of Raalte
		Labial	Alveolar	Dorsal	Glottal
Nasal		m	n	ŋ	
Stop	voiceless	p	t	k	
Stop	voiced	b	d	(ɡ)	
Fricative	voiceless	f	s	χ	h
Fricative	voiced	v	z	ɣ	
Trill			r		
Approximant		ʋ	l	j	

- [ɡ] appears only as an allophone of /k/ before voiced consonants.
- /ʋ/ occurring before and after back-rounded vowels is pronounced as a labio-velar approximant [w].
- After long close and close-mid vowels, /r/ surfaces as a diphthongization of the vowel, as in zoer [ˈzuːə̯]. This also happens in compounds: veurkämer [vøːə̯kæːmər]. It is also often dropped preconsonantally after /ə/.

=== Vowels ===
Raalte monophthongs
	Front				Central	Back	
	unrounded		rounded		Central	Back	
	short	long	short	long	Central	short	long
Close	i	iː	y	yː		u	uː
Close-mid	ɪ	eː	ʏ	øː	ə	ʊ	oː
Open-mid	ɛ	ɛː	œ	œː	ə	ɔ	ɔː
Open	æ	æː				ɑ	ɑː

- Unlike in Standard Dutch, the long close-mid monophthongs /eː, øː, oː/ are actual monophthongs and not narrow closing diphthongs [ei, øy, ou]. They do not appear before /r/ whenever that consonant occurs before a vowel or at the end of a word, where the open-mid series /ɛː, œː, ɔː/ occurs instead.
- The schwa /ə/ is often dropped before /n/, resulting in a syllabic nasal homorganic with the preceding consonant. This occurs after most consonants, including nasals themselves: piepen [ˈpipm̩], slóffen [ˈslʊfɱ̍], gieten [ˈχiːtn̩], kieken [ˈkikŋ̍], esprungen [əˈsprœŋŋ̍], lachen [ˈlɑχɴ̩]. The sequences /əl/ and /ər/ are treated the same, except for the fact that they do not assimilate to the place of articulation of the preceding consonant.

Raalte diphthongs
	Front		Back	
Close	ij, iu	yi, yu	uw	
Open	ɛi ɪu	œy	ɔi ʊi	ɑu

- /œy/ is realized as [œi] before vowels and in the word-final position.

== Some examples ==
=== Present tense ===
Sallaans	Dutch	English
Ik loop(e)	Ik loop	I walk
Ie loopt / lopen	Jij loopt	You walk
Hee/hi'j / Zie/zi'j lup(t)	Hij / Zij loopt	He / she walks
Wie loopt / lopen	Wij lopen	We walk
Jullie / Juulu / ieluu loopt / lopen	Jullie lopen	You walk (plural)
Zie loopt / lopen	Zij lopen	They walk

=== Past tense ===
Sallaans	Dutch	English
Ik liepe	Ik liep	I walked
Ie liep'n	Jij liep	You walked
Hee / Zee liep	Hij / Zij liep	He / She walked
Wuu-lu liep'n	Wij liepen	We walked
Jullie / Juu-lu liep'n	Jullie liepen	You walked (plural)
Zie liep'n	Zij liepen	They walked

=== Plurals and diminutives ===
Sallaans	Dutch	English
een komme	een kom	One bowl
twee komm'n	twee kommen	Two bowls

Sallaans	Dutch	English
een kömmegie	een kommetje	one little bowl
twee kömmegies	twee kommetjes	two little bowls

== Bibliography ==
- Spa, J.J. (2011). De dialecten van centraal-Salland: Raalte, Heino en Lemelerveld.
