= Achterhooks =

Language spoken in Achterhoek, Netherlands

- Aachterhoeks, Achterhoek
- achterhooks
- The region of Achterhoek, where Achterhooks is spoken.
- Native to: Netherlands
- Region: Achterhoek
- Native speakers: 211,000 (2009)
- Language family: Indo-European: Germanic; West Germanic; North Sea Germanic; Low German; Low Saxon; Westphalian; Gelders-Overijssels; Achterhooks

Official status
- Official language in: The Netherlands

Language codes
- ISO 639-3: act
- Glottolog: acht1238

Achterhooks (Dutch Low Saxon: [ˈɑxtərɦoːks]; Dutch: Achterhoeks [ˈɑxtərɦuks]) is a Westphalian dialect spoken in Gelderland.

It differs markedly from Standard Dutch in its phonology, grammar and lexicon, and lexical differences observed from town to town are common.

== Geographic distribution ==
The Achterhooks language is spoken in the Netherlands in western Europe, Northeast, with speakers concentrated in the cultural region of Achterhoek in Gelderland Province.

=== Status ===
The language was recognized by the government of the Netherlands in 1996 (as being part of Low Saxonian).

The speech variety has had some growth and development, with Bible portions translated in 2002.
