= Urkish =

Urkish may mean:

- Urkers dialect, the dialect spoken in Urk in the Netherlands
- Urkesh, a city at the base of the Taurus Mountains in what is now northern Syria
