= Rectum, Netherlands =

Rectum
- Hamlet
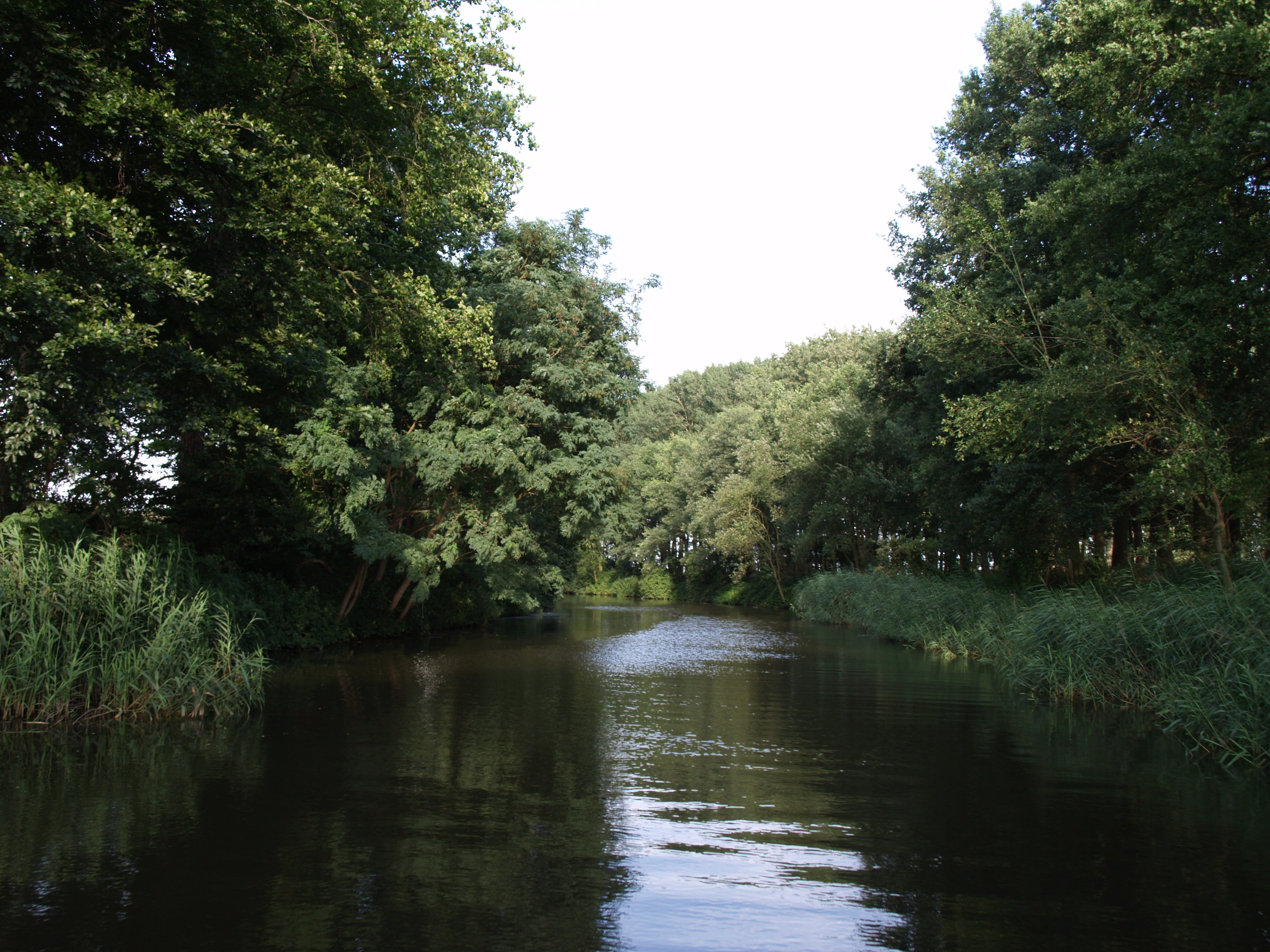
- Water in Rectum

- Location in province of Overijssel in the Netherlands Rectum (Netherlands)
- Coordinates: 52.3277°N 6.5708°E
- Country: Netherlands
- Province: Overijssel
- Municipality: Wierden

Area
  - Total: 5.80 km^{2} (2.24 sq mi)
- Elevation: 11 m (36 ft)

Population (2021)
  - Total: 355
  - Density: 61.2/km^{2} (159/sq mi)
- Time zone: UTC+1 (CET)
  - Summer (DST): UTC+2 (CEST)
- Postal code: 7642
- Dialing code: 0546

Rectum is a hamlet in the Dutch province of Overijssel. It is part of the municipality of Wierden. The hamlet is located about 4 kilometres (2.5 mi) north of Enter.

== Etymology ==
The name is of Low Saxon origin and is a combination of corrupted words Recde or Regde (from the old name for the river Regge) and suffix -tum, meaning residence, or settlement. The name translates to 'settlement on the Regge'.

== History ==
The area around Rectum was settled in prehistory. Pottery has been discovered from the 10th and 11th century. Rectum was first mentioned in 1297. It has always been an agricultural community. During the 21st century, vineyards were established in the hamlet.

At the 1795 census, Rectum was home to 151 people. A school was established in the mid-17th century, but closed in the 1980s. A joint school with IJpelo was established, and nowadays the two hamlets cooperate extensively, and share resources.

The postal authority does not recognise Rectum as a separate entity and has put it under Wierden. The hamlet is a statistical entity.

== Nature ==
Rectum is located in a forested area. In the early 21st century, drinking water wells were dug in the Rectum-IJpelo area, and a water buffer has been constructed. In 2013, it opened and provides drinking water for 150,000 people. The nature area Dakhorst has been laid out around the water buffer.
