= Dick Schutte =

Dutch politician

D.G. "Dick" Schutte (born 1947 in Wilsum, Overijssel) is a former Dutch politician. He is a member of the Christian Union and before that of the Reformatory Political Federation.

Schutte was mayor of Urk from 1999 to 2005. Previously he was an alderman of Oldebroek, a member of the provincial parliament of Gelderland, Flevoland and a civil servant.

From 2007 to 2019 (?) he was Chairperson of Christians for Israel, a Dutch Christian pro-Israel movement.

He is a member of the Netherlands Reformed Churches.
