= Kruppwerke =

Kruppwerke is a part of the city of Bochum in the Ruhr area in North Rhine-Westphalia in Germany. Up to the 19th century Westphalian was spoken here. Kruppwerke is a district largely inhabited by the working class. Kruppwerke is between the districts of Bochum-Hamme and Weitmar-Mitte.
