= Weitmar-Mark =

Weitmar-Mark is a suburb of the city of Bochum in North Rhine-Westphalia, Germany. Bochum is in the Ruhr area. The population used to speak Westphalian, but now High German is the norm. Weitmar-Mark is not far from the center of Bochum, between Weitmar-Mitte and Stiepel. Weitmar-Mark is a residential area.
