= Jan Ras =

Dutch footballer

Personal information
- Date of birth: 28 January 1999 (age 27)
- Place of birth: Urk, Netherlands
- Height: 1.74 m (5 ft 9 in)
- Position: Midfielder

Team information
- Current team: Urk
- Number: 10

Youth career
- Urk
- 2008–2019: Heerenveen

Senior career*
Years	Team	Apps	(Gls)
2019–2022	Heerenveen	4	(0)
2022–	Urk	70	(8)
- * Club domestic league appearances and goals as of 4 August 2025

Jan Ras (born 28 January 1999) is a Dutch professional footballer who plays as a midfielder for Vierde Divisie club Urk.

== Professional career ==
Born in Urk, Flevoland, Ras is a youth product of Heerenveen, having joined them at the age of 8. On 7 December 2017, Ras signed his first professional contract with Heerenveen for three years. Ras made his professional debut with Heerenveen in a 1–1 Eredivisie draw with Feyenoord on 11 August 2019.
