= Wierden =

- Municipality
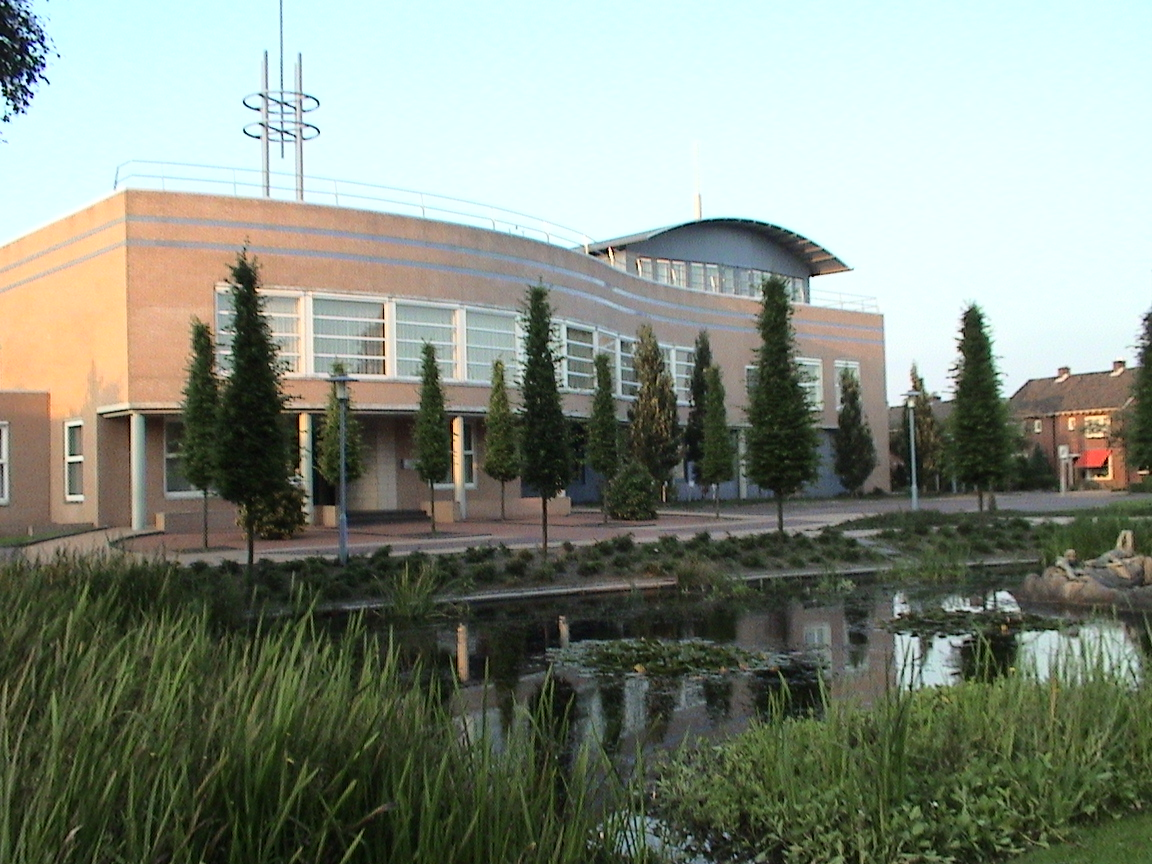
- Wierden city hall

- Flag Coat of arms

- Location in Overijssel
- Coordinates: 52°21′N 6°36′E
- Country: Netherlands
- Province: Overijssel

Government
  - Body: Municipal council
  - Mayor: Nick Hubers (VVD)

Area
  - Total: 95.39 km^{2} (36.83 sq mi)
  - Land: 94.63 km^{2} (36.54 sq mi)
  - Water: 0.76 km^{2} (0.29 sq mi)
- Elevation: 11 m (36 ft)

Population (January 2021)
  - Total: 24,538
  - Density: 259/km^{2} (670/sq mi)
- Demonym: Wierdenaar
- Time zone: UTC+1 (CET)
  - Summer (DST): UTC+2 (CEST)
- Postcode: 7464–7469, 7640–7649
- Area code: 0546, 0547, 0548
- Website: www.wierden.nl

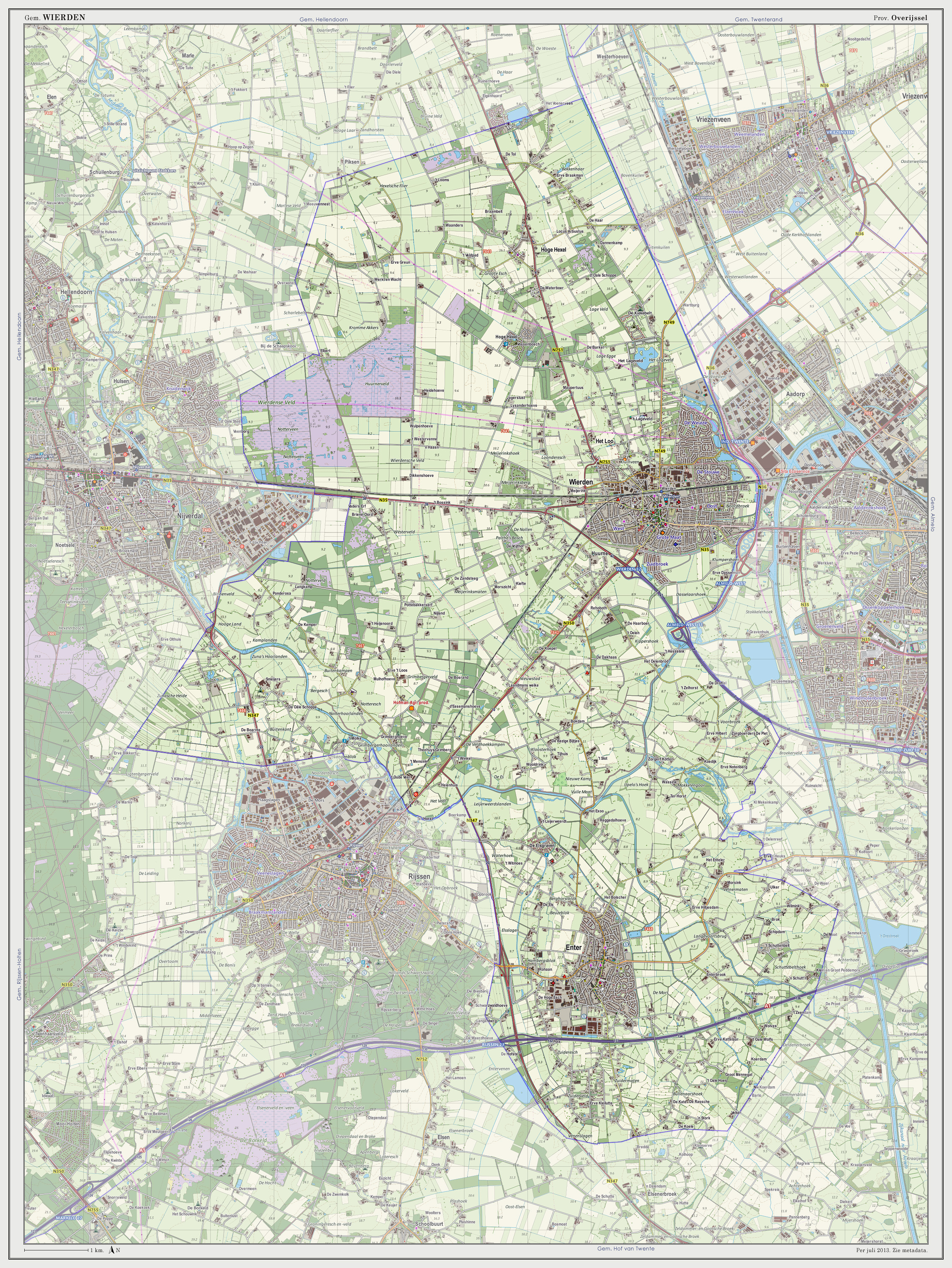
Dutch Topographic map of Wierden, July 2013

Wierden (Dutch pronunciation: [ˈʋiːrdə(n)]; Tweants: Wierdn) is a town and a municipality in the eastern Netherlands, in the province of Overijssel.

The municipality of Wierden also includes the following towns, villages and townships: Enter, Hoge Hexel, IJpelo, Notter, Rectum, and Zuna.

The municipality has 10 primary schools and 1 secondary school. There are 2 soccer clubs, 2 tennis clubs and 1 volleyball club, this is only the top of the clubs. The village has 3 cemeteries of which, only one is currently in use. The mayor is Doret Tigchelaar-van Oene, who is also the chair of the board of mayor and aldermen.

In midsummer, the locally known, 3-day festival "WieZo" is held. It starts on a Thursday and ends on Saturday. Every night there are 2 musical acts on the Binnenhof. On Saturday there is also the Wiezoloop. For some years the Wiezoloop has become an independent event, separate from the Wiezo, and is held the same year about 1 month earlier.

== International relations ==
=== Twin towns — sister cities ===
Wierden is twinned with:

- Ermont, France
- Lampertheim, Germany
- Maldegem, Belgium

Since September 2010, the town council decided to stop the cooperation between the municipalities because of the high costs and too low benefit.

== Gallery ==
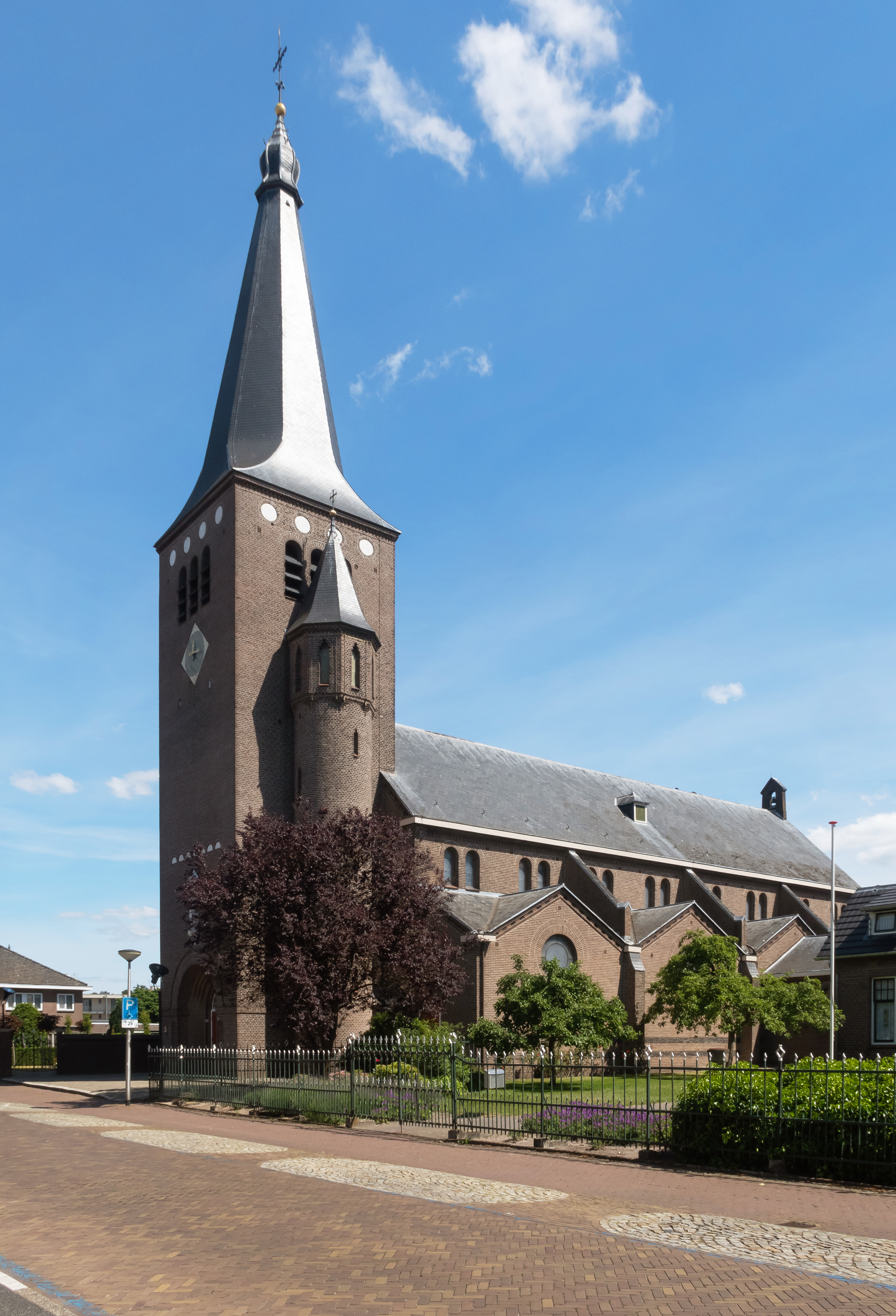
Church: the Sint Jan de Doperkerk

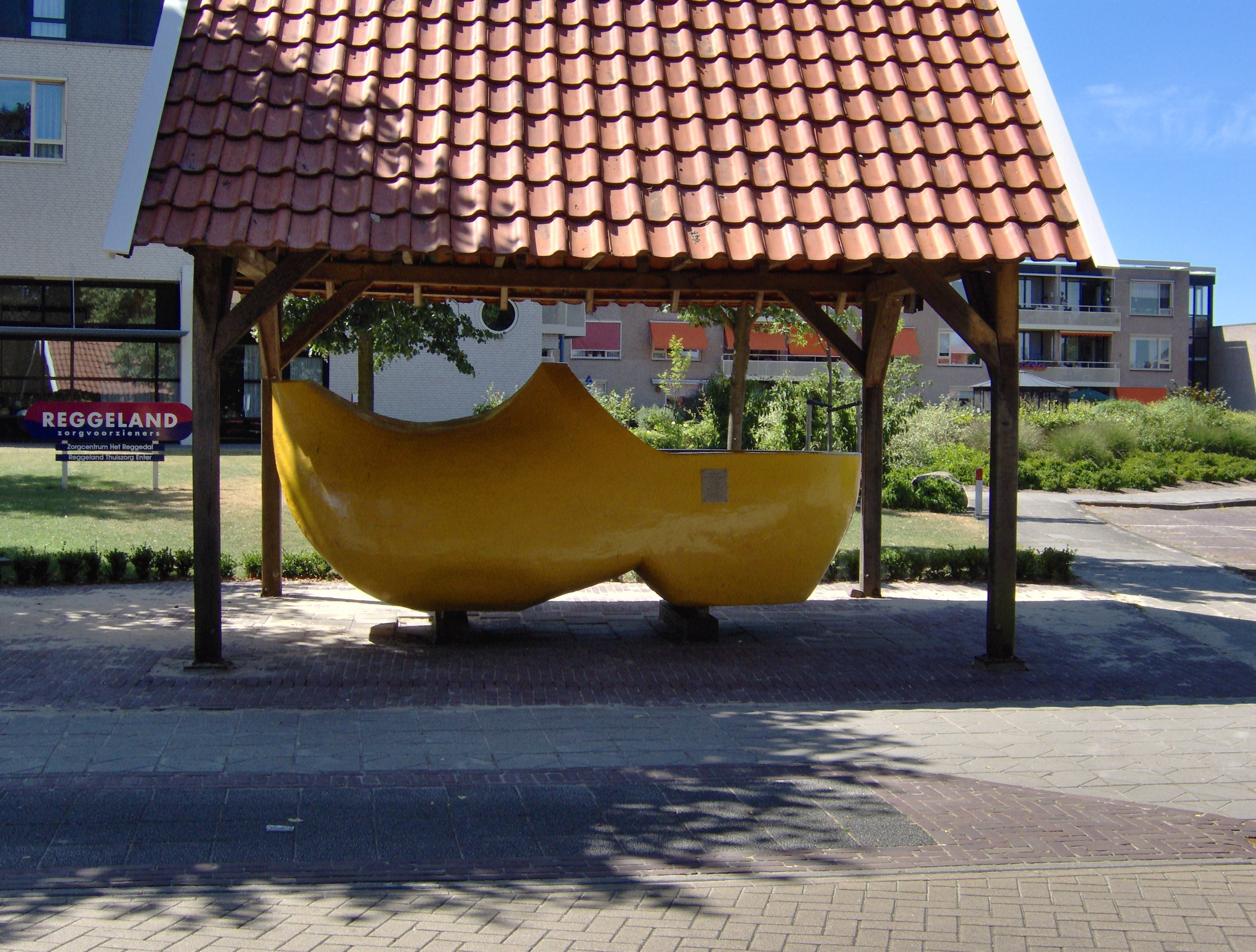
World's largest wooden shoe made out of one piece of wood, in the Guinness Book of Records since June 26, 1991. It stands in the village of Enter, Netherlands

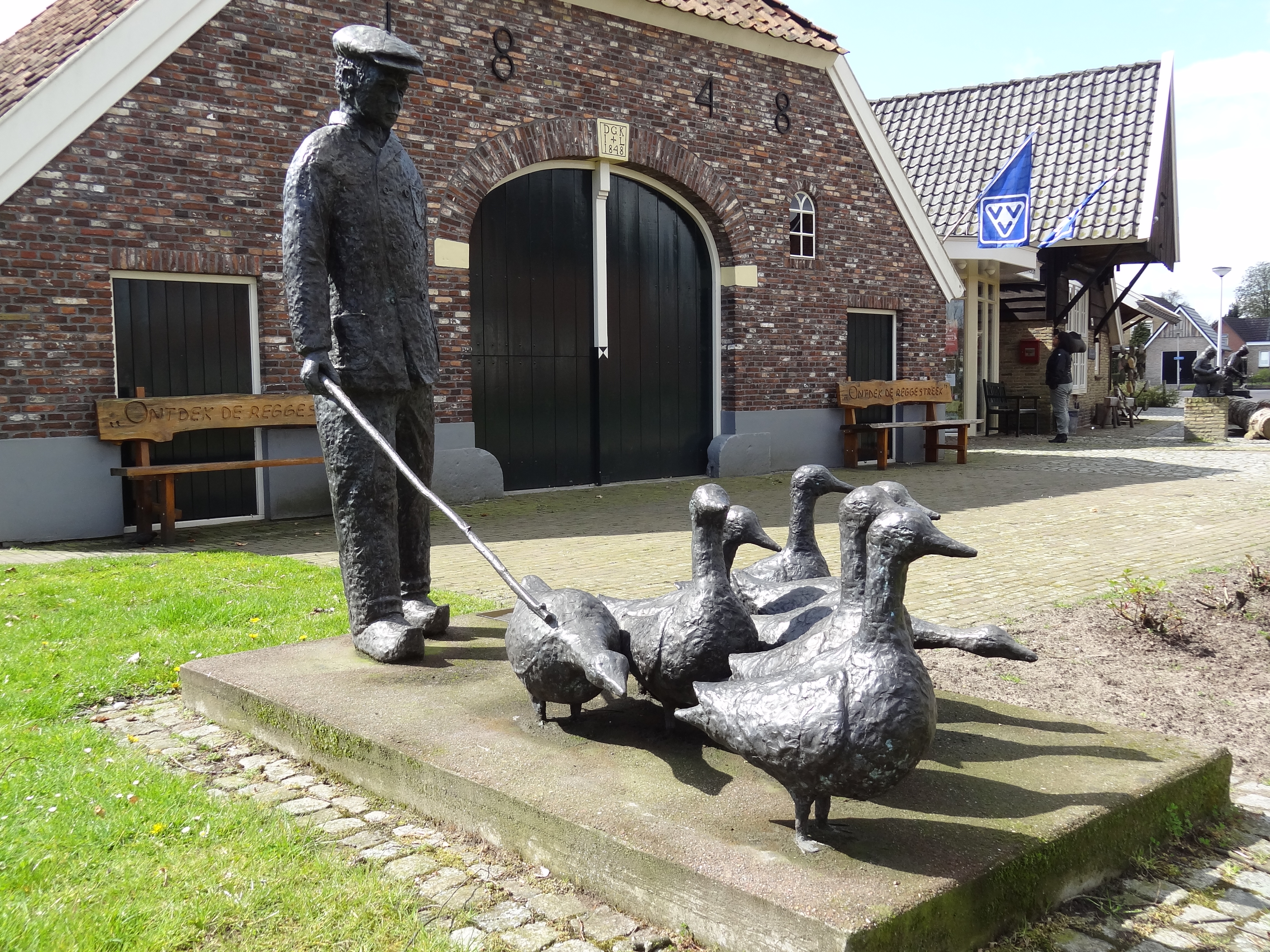
'Gaanzendriewer' (Geese driver) by Piet Brouwer in front of the Klompenmuseum 't Schöpke

== Notable residents ==
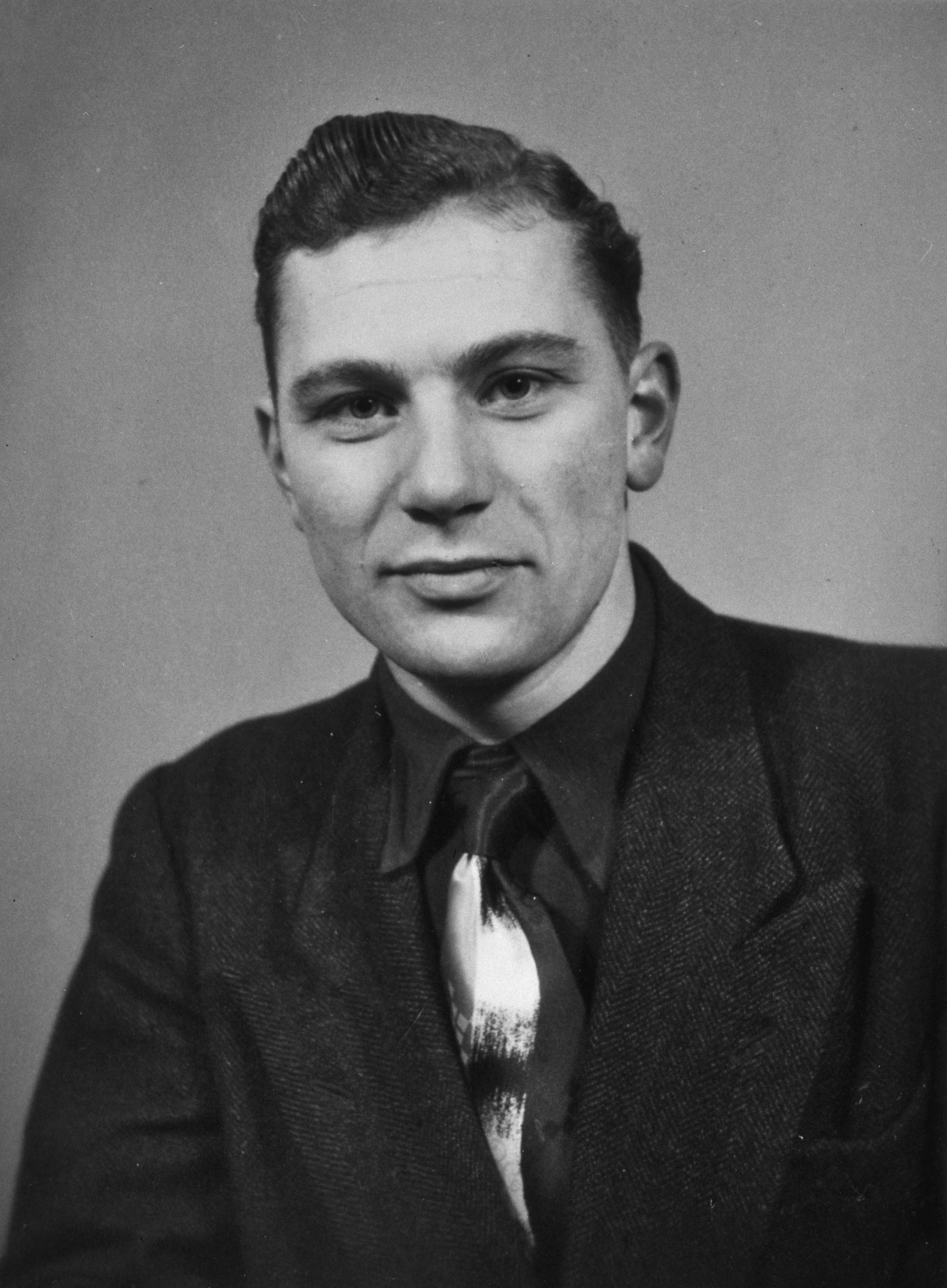
Anton Huiskes, 1952

- Johanna ter Steege (born 1961), actress
- Loes Haverkort (born 1981), actress

=== Sport ===
- Anton Huiskes (1928–2008), ice-skater and national team trainer, competed at the 1948 and 1952 Winter Olympics
- Hennie Stamsnijder (born 1954) former professional cyclo-cross and road racing cyclist
- Jos Lammertink (born 1958) retired road bicycle racer
- Berthil ter Avest (born 1970), soccer player, 275 caps
- Marieke van den Ham (born 1983) a water polo player, team gold medallist at the 2008 Summer Olympics
- Annefleur Kalvenhaar (1994–2014) cyclist and mountain biker
- Tom Stamsnijder (born 1985) former professional road bicycle racer
