= Urk =

Urk Urrek (Westphalian)
- Municipality
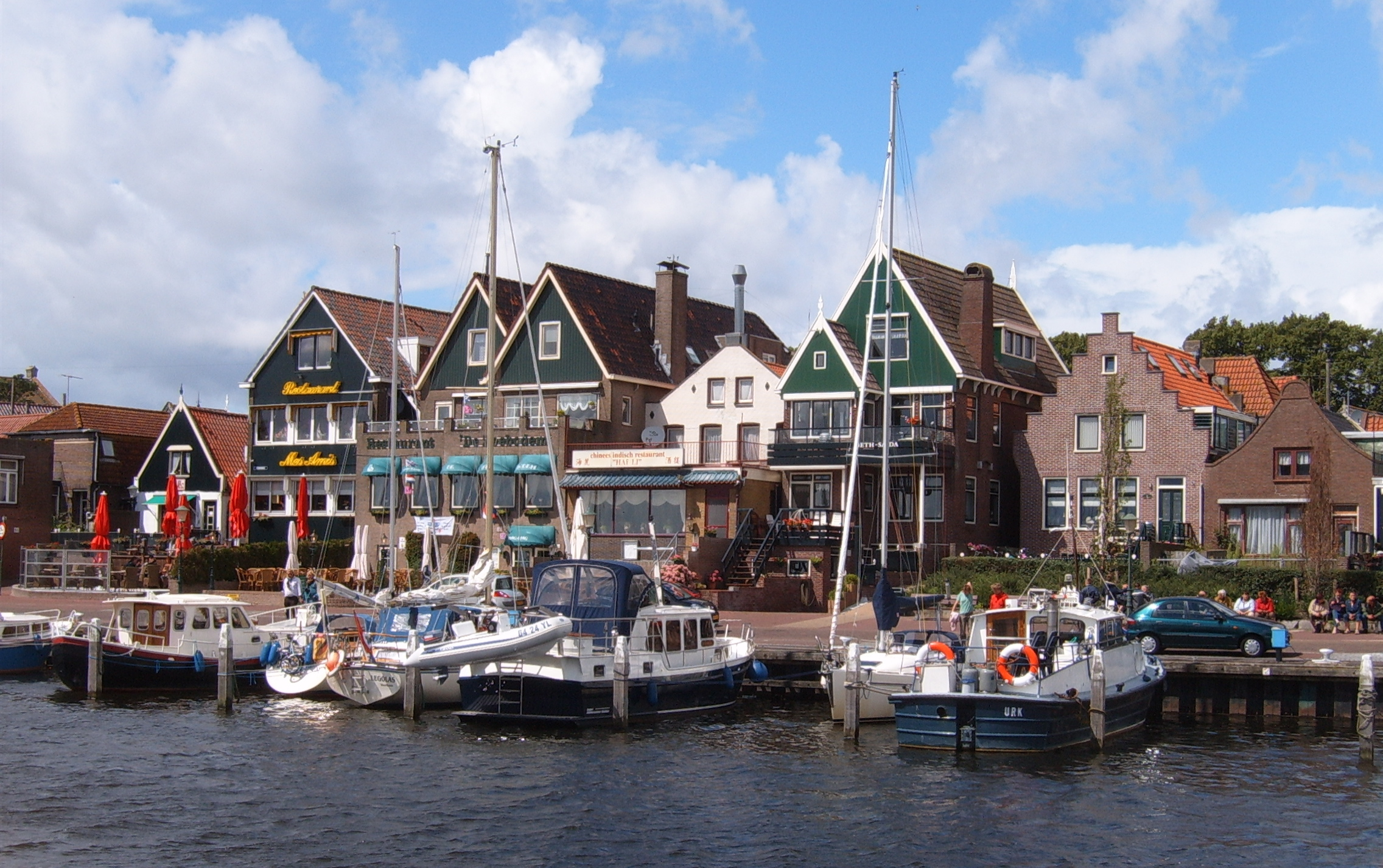
- The quay of Urk

- Flag Coat of arms

- Location in Urk municipality

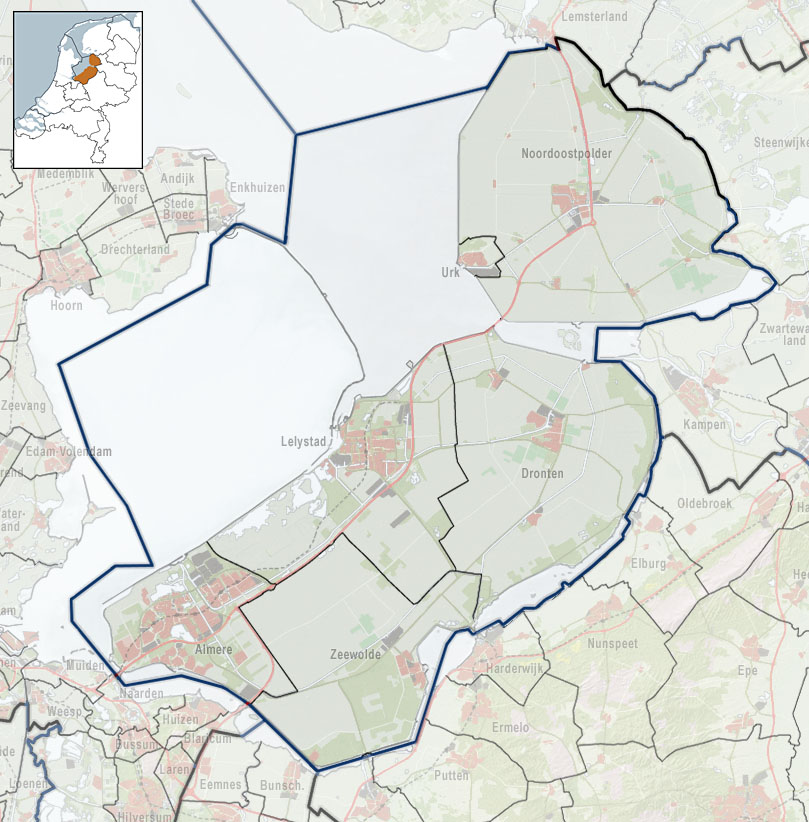
- Location in the Netherlands Urk (Netherlands)
- Coordinates: 52°39′47″N 5°35′55″E
- Country: Netherlands
- Province: Flevoland

Government
  - Body: Municipal council
  - Mayor: Bart Jaspers Faijer (CU)

Area
  - Total: 111.86 km^{2} (43.19 sq mi)
  - Land: 13.15 km^{2} (5.08 sq mi)
  - Water: 98.71 km^{2} (38.11 sq mi)
- Elevation: 0 m (0 ft)

Population (January 2021)
  - Total: 21,227 ▲
  - Density: 1,614/km^{2} (4,180/sq mi)
- Demonym: Urker
- Time zone: UTC+1 (CET)
  - Summer (DST): UTC+2 (CEST)
- Postcode: 8320–8324
- Area code: 0527
- Website: www.urk.nl

Urk (Dutch: [ˈʏr(ə)k]; Urkers: Urrek; Dutch Low Saxon: Ürrek) is a municipality and a town in the Flevoland province in the center-north of the Netherlands with a population of 22,173 as of 2025. It is surrounded by the Noordoostpolder on land and is on the coast of the IJsselmeer. Urk was formerly an island in the Almere, an inland sea that would become part of the Zuiderzee in the 13th century after a series of incursions by the North Sea. The building of a dike from Lemmer in 1939 ended Urk's status as an island and connected it to the Dutch mainland.

The mainstay of the town's formal economy has always been fishing, with Urk having the largest fishing fleet in the Netherlands. The products of the sea coming in through Urk harbor continue to be exported widely, although today Urk's fishing boats must travel greater distances to gather them than was required in most historical periods. Urk's inhabitants are socially tight-knitted and maintain their own unique dialect of Dutch. Religious life has traditionally been very important to Urk's inhabitants, with active, conservative congregations of the Dutch Reformed denominations playing key roles in the life of the community.

== Geography ==
Towards the north, the IJsselmeer is enclosed by an arc of boulder clay high areas of land which formed during an ice age glaciations of the Pleistocene epoch: Texel, Wieringen, Urk, de Voorst, and Gaasterland. To the south of that arc a lake formed as a result of meltwater, which became known as Almere. North of the boulder clay highland of Urk, the Vecht river flowed into the Almere, while the river IJssel with tributaries flowed into the south of Urk. As the climate became warmer during the Middle Ages, the sea level rose whilst the surrounding areas have been slowly steadily sinking because of forebulge effect since the end of the Ice Age. During the 13th century (and especially after a large storm in 1287) the Zuiderzee formed, and the water round Urk suddenly became a tidal sea. Because there was no sea defense, over time large pieces of the island eroded. The southwest side of Urk, which rose perpendicularly out of the sea, was called het Hoge Klif ("the High Cliff"). Around 1700 the municipality of Amsterdam donated sea defenses to Urk. The town contains the highest point in the province of Flevoland.

== History ==
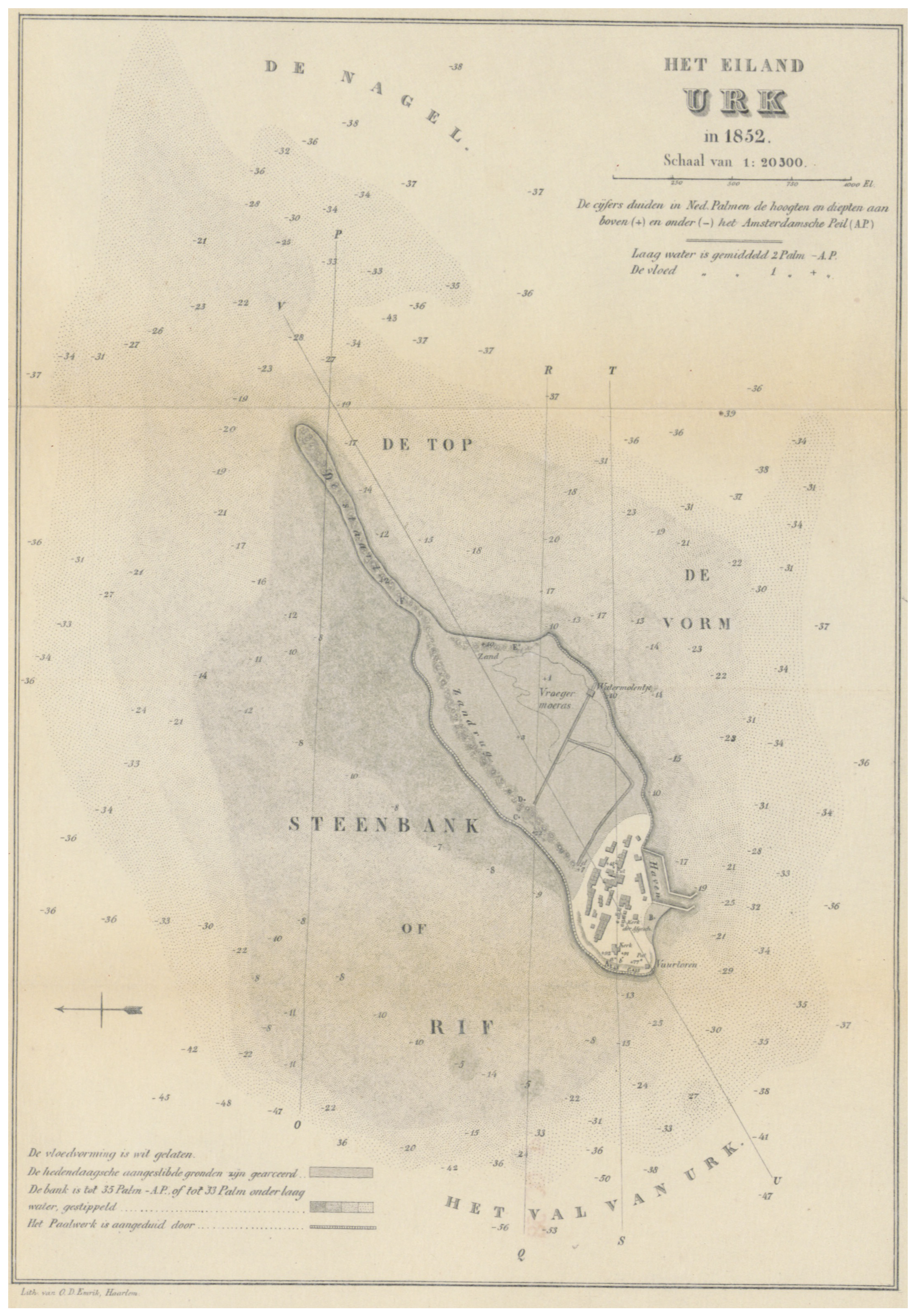
Map of the Urk Island in 1852.

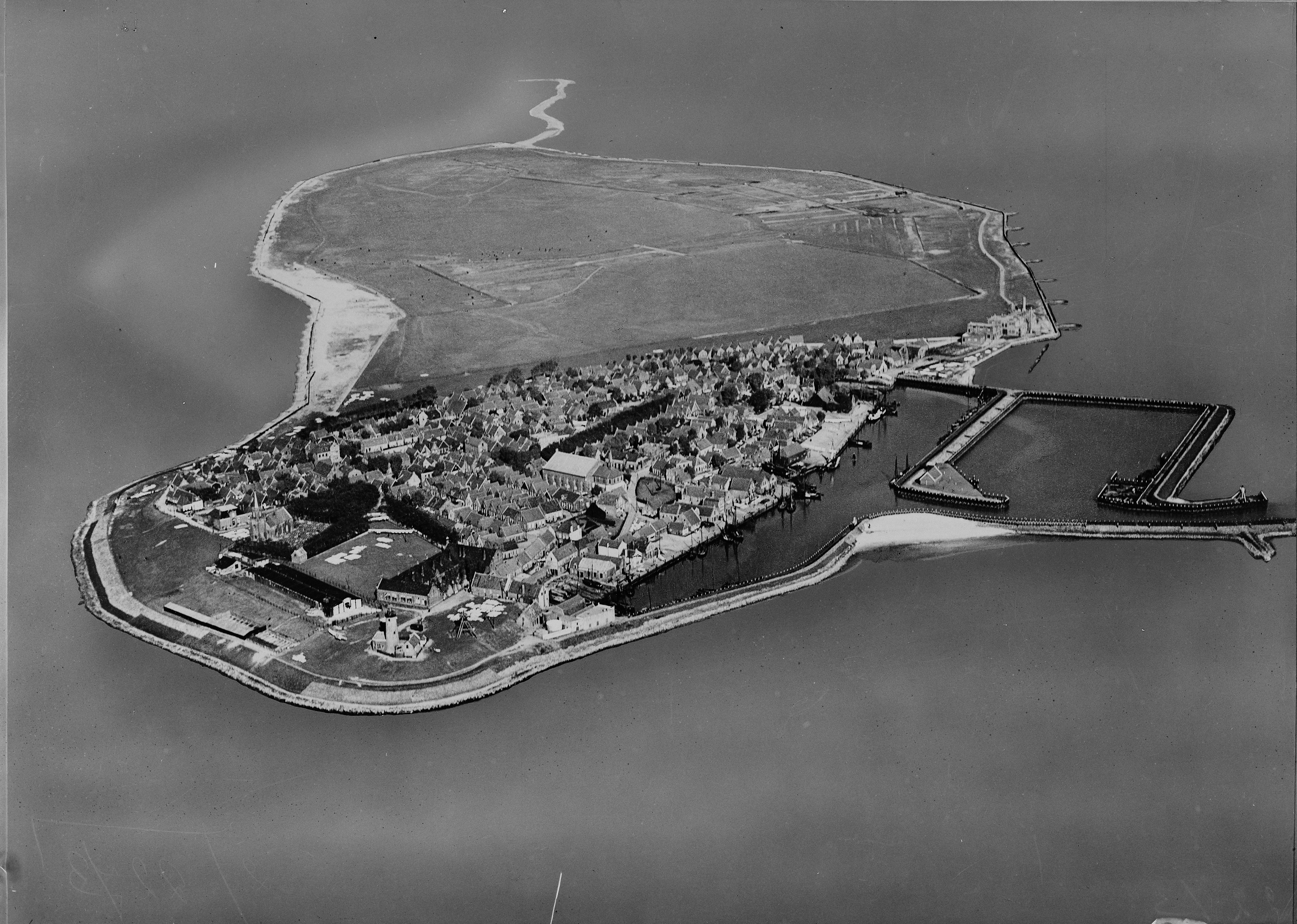
Aerial photograph of the former island, before its integration in the Noordoostpolder, 1920–40 (Nederlands Instituut voor Militaire Historie).

The oldest instance of the name "Urk" is a donation certificate of 966 from Holy Roman Emperor Otto I to the Sint Pantaleonsklooster monastery in Cologne. The text reads: cuiisdam insulae medietatem in Almere, que Urch vocatur (Latin: "of a certain island in the middle of Almere, which is called Urch"). Until 1475 the High and Low Lordship of Urk and Emmeloord (the most northern village of Schokland) was in the hands of the Van Kuinre family. From 1475 to 1614, the Zoudenbalch family of Utrecht were Lords of Urk and Emmeloord. From 1614 to 1660, Urk and Emmeloord were ruled by the van der Werve from Antwerp. From 1660 to 1792 Urk and Emmeloord belonged to the municipality of Amsterdam, and ruled from 1660 to 1672 by Andries de Graeff. From 1792 to 1950 Urk belonged to the province of North Holland.

Urk ceased to be an island in October 1939 as part of the Zuiderzee Works (just as the Afsluitdijk project was changing the salt water Zuiderzee surrounding Urk to the less saline IJsselmeer), and Urk's town expanded into the reclaimed land of the polder. Many Urkers who previously left the town because of overcrowding before the polder reclamation was completed were able to return to Urk. Later, seabed areas surrounding Urk were reclaimed from the sea to become the Noordoostpolder. In 1950, Urk's jurisdiction moved away from North Holland to become part of the province of Overijssel. Since 1986, Urk has belonged to the province of Flevoland.

The Noordoostpolder in its early years had an alternative name "Urker Land," from which Urk's newspaper, Het Urkerland, gets its name.

== Economy ==
The important economic pillar of the village remains fishery. After the IJsselmeer was formed, the Urkers moved their fishing operations to the North Sea. Additionally, Urk is focused on making a connection between the existing economy and new activities such as tourism, social care, maritime industry and services. The local council is keen to particularly promote tourism, retail and fisheries. In the past, many lives were lost in storms on the Zuiderzee and North Sea. There is a memorial to lost fishermen in Urk, popularly known as the Urker vrouw: a statue of a woman looking out to sea, vainly awaiting the return of her husband and sons.

== Transport ==
The A6 motorway is a major road near Urk connecting it south to Flevopolder and north to Friesland.

Urk has no railway station but the nearest stations are Kampen, Dronten and Lelystad, each approximately 30 kilometres (19 miles) away. This makes Urk one of the most isolated places in the Netherlands as far as railway connections are concerned.

Regular passenger ferry services run during summer months across the IJsselmeer to Enkhuizen.

== Demographics ==
Historical population
Year	Pop.	±%
1795	575	—
1830	789	+37.2%
1840	1,025	+29.9%
1849	1,214	+18.4%
1859	1,391	+14.6%
1869	1,244	−10.6%
1879	2,136	+71.7%
1889	2,596	+21.5%
1899	2,764	+6.5%
1909	2,674	−3.3%
1920	2,975	+11.3%
1930	3,181	+6.9%
1940	4,082	+28.3%
1950	4,668	+14.4%
1960	5,618	+20.4%
1970	8,027	+42.9%
1980	10,187	+26.9%
1990	13,014	+27.8%
2000	15,719	+20.8%
2010	18,310	+16.5%
2020	21,031	+14.9%
2026	22,429	+6.6%
Source: Volkstellingen/CBS

Religions in Urk (2013)
1. Protestantism (82.2%)
2. Roman Catholic (1.70%)
3. Other Christian denomination (13.8%)
4. Irreligion (2.30%)

Year 2018

- Birth Rate: 20.3 per 1000
- Death Rate: 3.24 per 1000
- NGR: +1.90% per year

The birth rate of the municipality of Urk is the highest in the Netherlands as of 2016 (and highest in previous years). But like many other places in the Netherlands this number declined to 18.7% (down from 30.8% in 1988). In 1988 only Zeewolde had a slightly higher birth rate at 31.3%, but the birth rate Urk remained the second highest. The total fertility rate declined to 2.6 (down from 3.9 in 1988).

In 2021, 44 per cent of Urk's population was under the age of 25. This made Urk the demographically youngest municipality of the Netherlands. Number two in the country was Staphorst, another Calvinist community nearby.

== Politics ==
=== Local ===
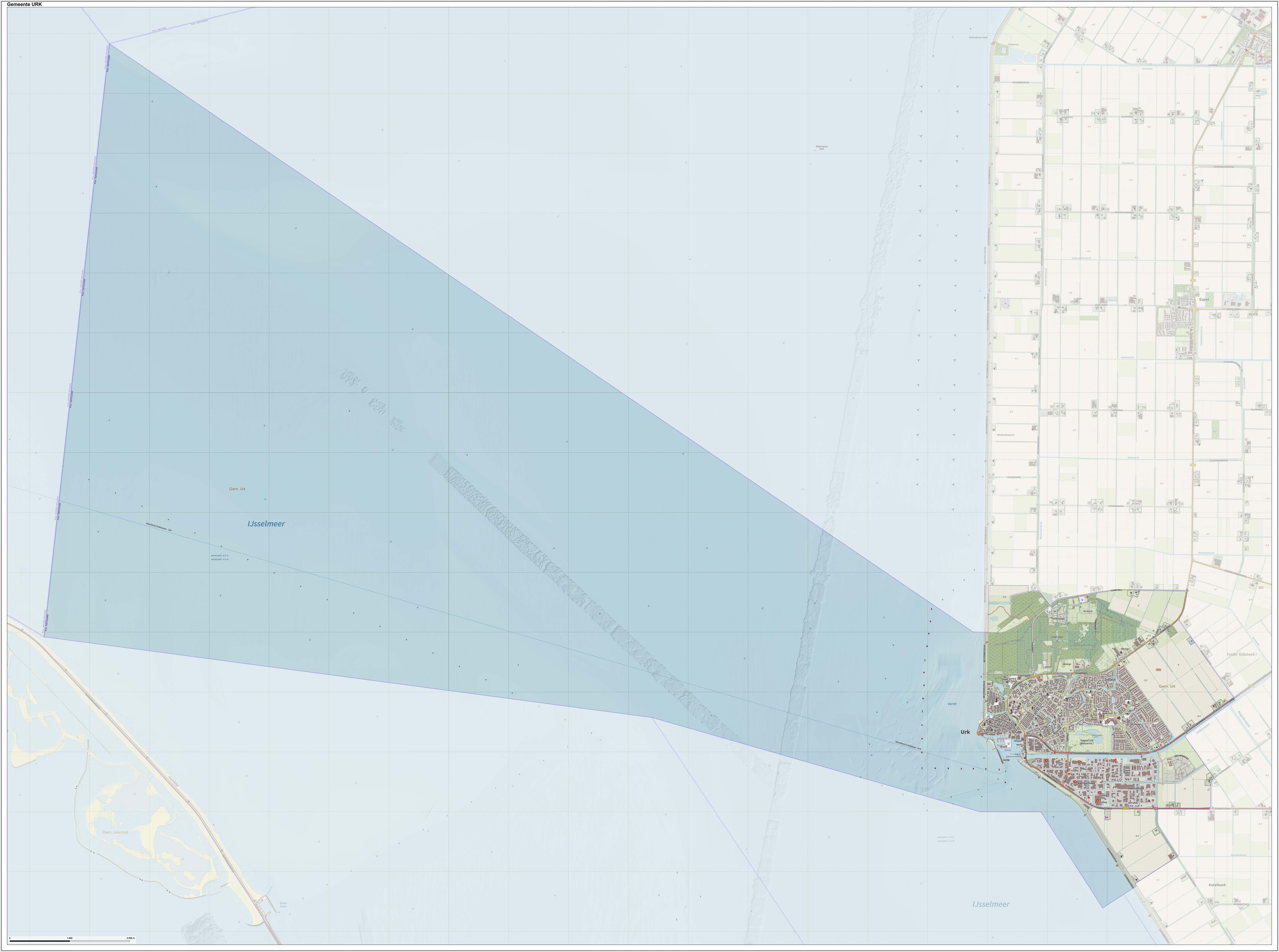
Dutch topographic map of the municipality of Urk, June 2015

The municipal council currently (2026) contains five political parties:

- SGP: 7 seats
- Hart voor Urk: 3 seats
- CDA: 3 seats
- Christian Union: 2 seats
- FVD: 1 seat
- Krachtig Urk: 1 seat
- Gemeentebelangen: 1 seat
- RBU: 1 seat

Gemeentebelangen, Hart voor Urk, Krachtig Urk and RBU are local political parties. Hart voor Urk was founded by former SGP councillor Jan Koffeman and shares many policy positions with the SGP.

For the 2026–2030 term, Urk is governed by a majority coalition consisting of the SGP, CDA and ChristenUnie. The coalition holds 12 of the 19 seats on the municipal council. The executive board consists of Mayor Bart Jaspers Faijer and four aldermen: Tunis Hoekstra (SGP), Wilco van Klinken (SGP), Emma Wakker (CDA) and Albert Woord (ChristenUnie).

The coalition brings together three Christian parties that have traditionally dominated local politics in Urk. The SGP is a conservative Reformed Protestant party and remains the municipality's largest political force. The CDA is a Christian-democratic party, while the ChristenUnie combines Christian-social and socially conservative principles.

Following the 2026 election, the SGP initially expressed a preference for forming a coalition with Hart voor Urk. However, coalition negotiations ultimately resulted in an agreement between the SGP, CDA and ChristenUnie.

Urk's political landscape is distinct within the Netherlands. Christian-democratic and orthodox Protestant parties have traditionally dominated local politics, reflecting the municipality's strong religious, cultural and community-oriented character. Political debate is often centred around family life, social cohesion, economic development, housing, and the future of the fishing and maritime sectors, which remain important pillars of Urk's identity and economy.

National parties such as the VVD, D66 and Progressief Nederland are not represented in the municipal council. Support for liberal, social-democratic and green parties has historically remained limited compared to most Dutch municipalities. Although a local VVD branch was established in 2011 and contested the 2014 municipal election, it received 2.7% of the vote, which was insufficient to secure a seat on the council.

=== National ===
Urk is one of the most politically conservative areas in the Netherlands. As part of the so-called Dutch "Bible belt", a vast majority of election votes go to the three Christian parties in the Netherlands, SGP, ChristenUnie and CDA. Urk is also known for its high turnout at each election, which is usually considerably higher than the national average (although general turnout percentages have dropped approx. 10% since 2002).

Voting patterns used to be relatively stable, with approximately 85-90% of the votes spread out evenly over SGP, ChristenUnie and CDA (each between 25-35%). CDA in Urk usually got more votes in national elections than in local elections, while ChristenUnie's support is sometimes twice locally compared to what it receives from Urk voters in national elections (this is sometimes attributed to the apparent left-wing leanings of the ChristenUnie nationally, while ChristenUnie in Urk tends to be more conservative). SGP's support locally is not much different from its support in national elections. In the last elections, the support for CDA and CU dwindled. The short-lived christian democratic party New Social Contract won 6% in 2023.

However, in recent years a few changes in voting patterns occurred, such as a growing support for national protest parties such as the LPF or Geert Wilders' PVV Freedom Party. Also, voting patterns these days tend to show bigger swings, as shown in 2010's and 2012's national elections in which CDA lost 11% and 13% respectively, and in 2011's regional elections, in which ChristenUnie lost 18%. In 2012, orthodox-Christian SGP even registered an absolute majority with 51.2% of the vote. (In the European Elections of 2014, the combined ChristenUnie/SGP list even registered 78% of the vote).

Support for established left wing parties, such as the Labour Party or the Socialist Party, remains minimal.

Summary of the 2017, 2021, 2023 and 2025 Dutch House of Representatives election results (Urk)
Parties	Political Ideology	2017 Votes %	2021 Vote %	2023 Vote %	2025 Vote %
Reformed Political Party (Staatkundig Gereformeerde Partij, SGP)	Conservatism, Reformed Christian	56.1%	54.4%	48.35%	54.21%
Party for Freedom (Partij voor de Vrijheid, PVV)	Right-wing populism/Anti-Islam	11.0%	13.8%	25.74%	17.28%
Forum for Democracy (Forum voor Democratie, FvD)	Right-wing populism/Anti-Islam	-	9.0%	3.69%	9.01%
ChristianUnion (ChristenUnie, CU)	Social-Christianity /Orthodox Protestantism	11.6%	8.1%	4.14%	5.27%
Christian Democratic Appeal (Christen-Democratisch Appèl, CDA)	Christian Democracy	14.2%	7.8%	3.71%	6.13%
People's Party for Freedom and Democracy (Volkspartij voor Vrijheid en Democratie, VVD)	Conservative liberalism	1.8%	1.7%	0.86%	1.19%
Democrats 66 (Democraten 66, D66)	Social liberalism, Radicalism, Progressivism	0.5%	0.5%	0.16%	0.66%
Party for the Animals (Partij voor de Dieren, PvdD)	Animal rights/Animal welfare	0.2%	0.3%	0.08%	0.16%
Socialist Party (Socialistische Partij, SP)	Socialism	0.7%	0.2%	0.27%	0.25%
GreenLeft (GroenLinks, GL)	Green politics	0.2%	0.2%	0.65%	0.57%
Labour Party (Partij van de Arbeid, PvdA)	Social Democracy	0.2%	0.2%	0.65%	0.57%
Other	–	3.4%	3.8%	12.36%	5.27%
Total		100%	100%	100%	100%
Turnout		81.57%	91.33%		89.5%

== Dialect ==
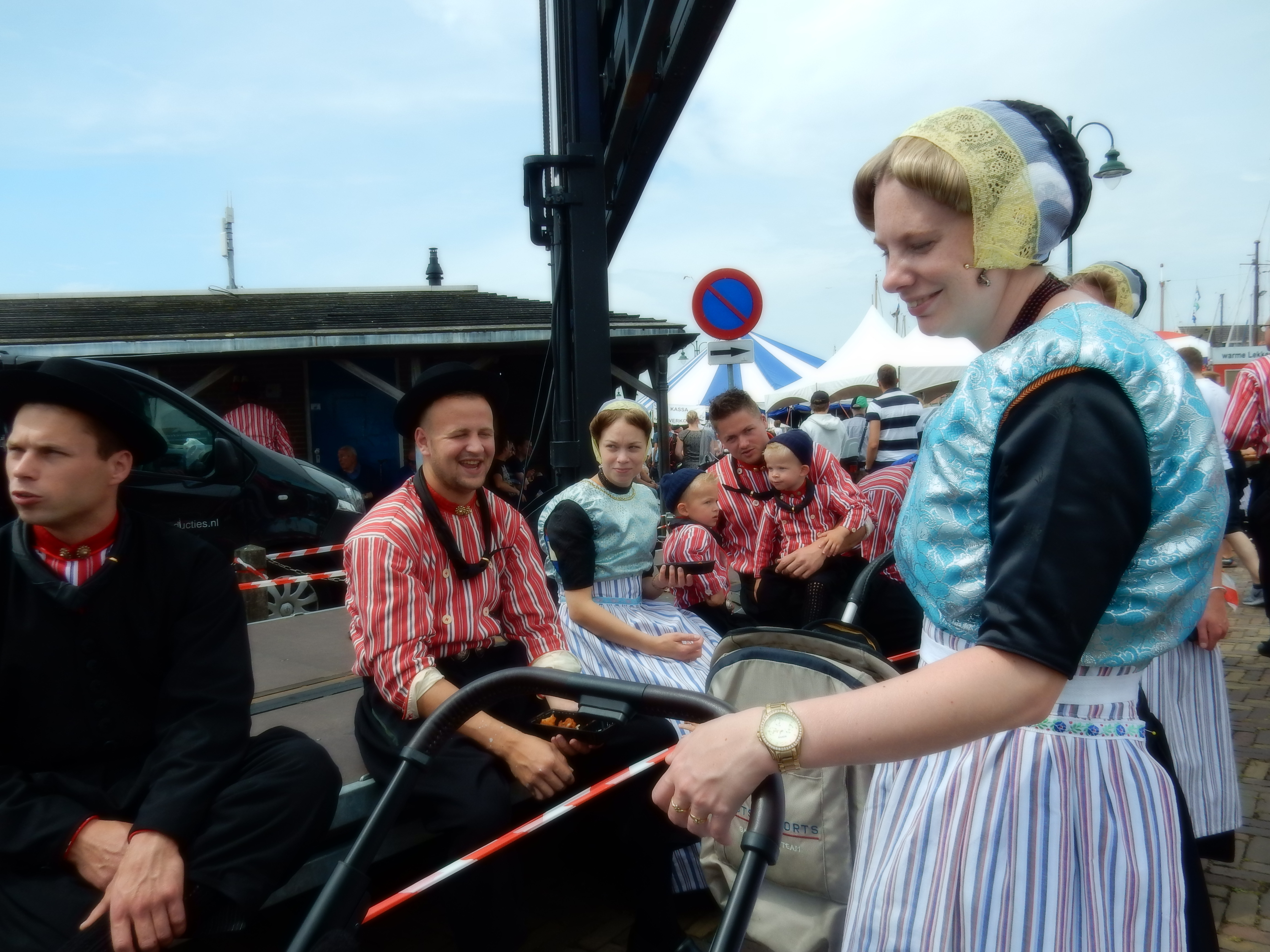
Locals in Urk in traditional clothing during Urkerdag festival

One of the oldest and most distinctive dialects of Westphalian is the language spoken in Urk. Nearly everyone in the village speaks this dialect and uses it in daily life. The Urkish dialect also includes elements that are older than standard Dutch and were never part of the standard language. For example, the old word for "father" in the Urkish dialect is taote. The dialect developed this way because until World War II, Urk was an island and could be reached only by boat. Radio was unknown, and the poor population did not have much money for newspapers and books. Until the modern era, primary education for the children typically lasted only two years; afterwards children had to help maintain the family, and formal schooling ended.

Linguistic classifications have assigned "the dialect of Urk" or "Urk" into an own dialect group. Urk is no longer an island and exposure to standard Dutch through the media is widespread. However, the distinctive Urkish dialect is still alive.

The Urkish dialect has more vowel sounds than standard Dutch and each vowel has short and long forms. The pronunciation of vowels deviates from standard Dutch and is closer to English.

Because living conditions in Urk in historical times were very poor, young girls (typically about age 11 or 12) would frequently leave the island to become domestic servants, mostly in or around Amsterdam. They often served with Jewish families. After a few years, they would return to Urk to form families of their own. As a result of this practice, the Urkish dialect absorbed some loanwords from the Amsterdam dialect and also from Yiddish. For instance, the Yiddish "shnur" for "sister-in-law" became the Urkish "snoar" (identical meaning); the Hebrew "kallah" (כלה) for "bride" became the Urkish "kalletjen", meaning "girlfriend" (literally "little bride").

When Napoleon occupied the Netherlands, many French words were incorporated into both standard Dutch and Urkish. Just as for standard Dutch, French words often changed form when incorporated into Urkish. The Urkish dialect has always been primarily a spoken language, and there are not many old texts written in the dialect. Only in recent years have people begun to write prose and poetry in the Urkish dialect. There are Urkers who have translated Bible books into Urkish, such as the book of Psalms.

== Culture ==
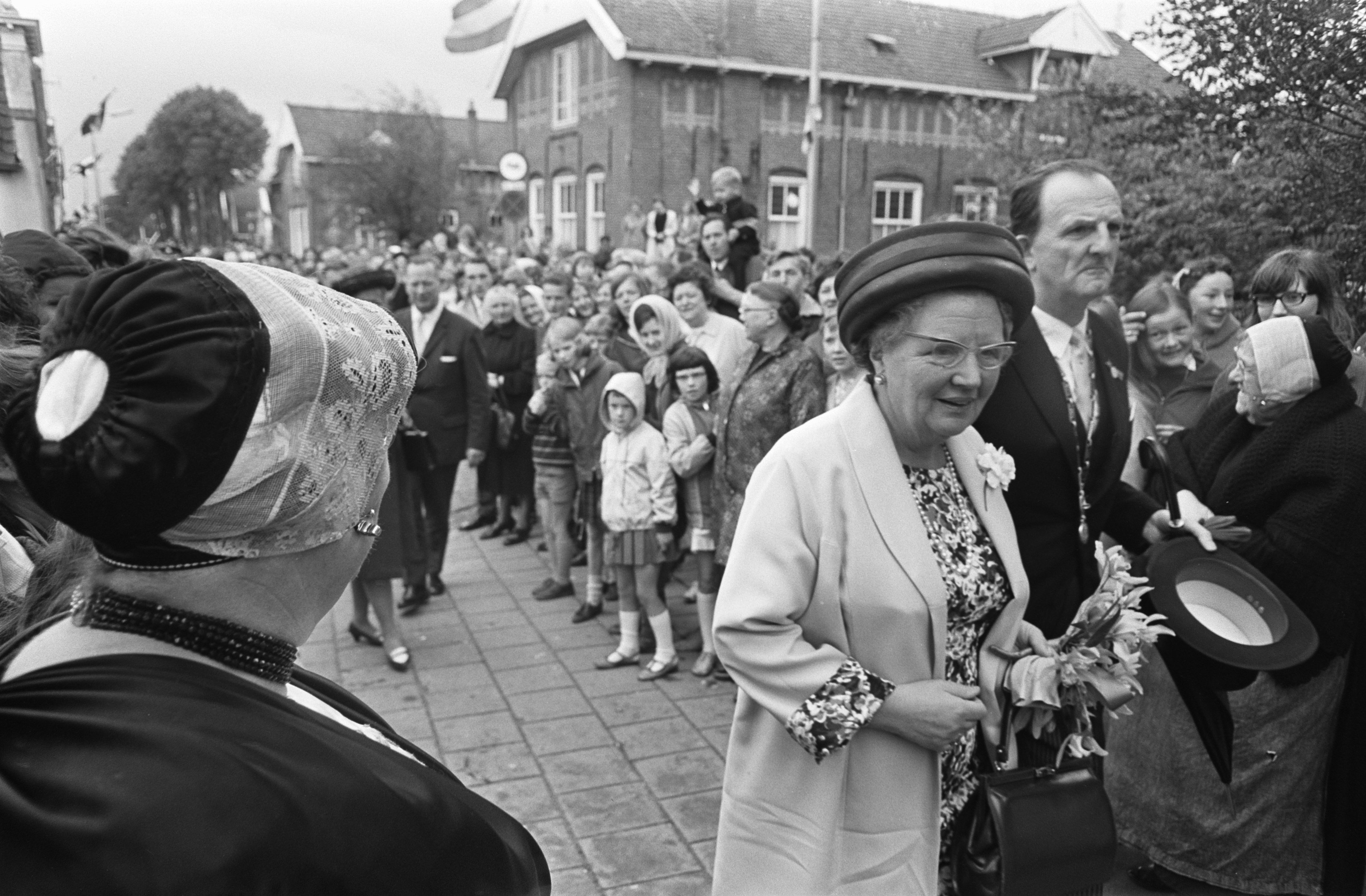
Queen Juliana of the Netherlands on a 1968 visit to Urk

=== Folktales ===
A famous Urkish folktale is the story parents tell their children when they want to know where babies come from. The tale involves a large exposed rock which can be seen in the IJsselmeer about 30 metres (98 feet) from the shore. This stone is known as the "Ommelebommelestien". Urkers often tell their children that there are two kinds of people-- vreemden (strangers) and Urkers (people from Urk). Strangers are usually born from a cabbage, or a stork brings them to their new parents, but Urkers come from a large stone which lies about 30 metres (98 feet) from the shores of their former island. Nowadays, the stone is usually called "Ommelebommelestien" (Ommel-Bommel Stone), but in former times it was called "Ommelmoerstien": moer means "mother's" in the Urkish dialect. In the tale, a stork comes all the way from Egypt to put babies in the stone. When the baby is about to be born, the baby's father is said to have to go to Schokland to pick up the key that gives access to the stone. So when an Urkish man is asked if he has been to Schokland, he is actually being asked if he has children. In the older days, when both Urk and Schokland were still islands in the Zuiderzee, the father had to take the obstetrician in his boat and row from Urk to Schokland to get the key, and then from Schokland to the Ommelebommelestien to get the baby. Nowadays he would be able to go to Schokland by car, but according to the legend he still has to row. The door to the stone is somewhere below sea level, so it is difficult to find. Once the door was found, a small price had to be paid for the baby: traditionally one Dutch guilder for a girl but two for a boy. The mother was said to be kept in bed with a nail through her right foot. There she would celebrate that she had just become a mother.

=== Arts ===
The prolific Dutch writer Albert Cornelis Baantjer was born here. Baantjer is mainly known for his large series of detective novels revolving around police inspector De Cock and his side-kick, sergeant Vledder.

Writer Jef Last lived on Urk for several years from 1932 onwards. He wrote several articles about Urk for one of the most progressive Dutch magazines, "De Groene Amsterdammer". While living here, he fell in love with a fisherman, and was inspired to write Zuiderzee. This novel deals with the love between two fishermen living on Urk and was one of the first, if not the first novel in Dutch literature to openly deal with homosexuality.

The Dutch writer, painter and resistance hero Willem Arondeus spent some time on Urk from 1920. While residing on Urk, during 1922, he wrote 'Afzijdige Strofen', a collection of twenty homo-erotic poems which were posthumously published in 2001.

== Notable people ==
- Willem Arondeus, (born 1894), a Dutch artist, author and Dutch resistance member, resided in Urk
- A.C. Baantjer (1923 in Urk – 2010) a Dutch author of detective fiction and police officer
- Dirk van Duijvenbode, (born 1992), professional darts player, grew up in Urk
- Geert Nentjes, (born 1998), professional darts player, lives in Urk
- Jan Ras (born 1999 in Urk) a Dutch footballer who plays for SV Urk
- Dick Schutte (born 1947 in Wilsum) a former Dutch politician, Mayor of Urk from 1999 to 2005
- Adri van Heteren (born 1951) a Dutch Christian minister in Urk

== See also ==
- Urk Lighthouse
- Marken
- Louise Kaiser, Urk language researcher
