= Notter, Netherlands =

Notter
- Hamlet
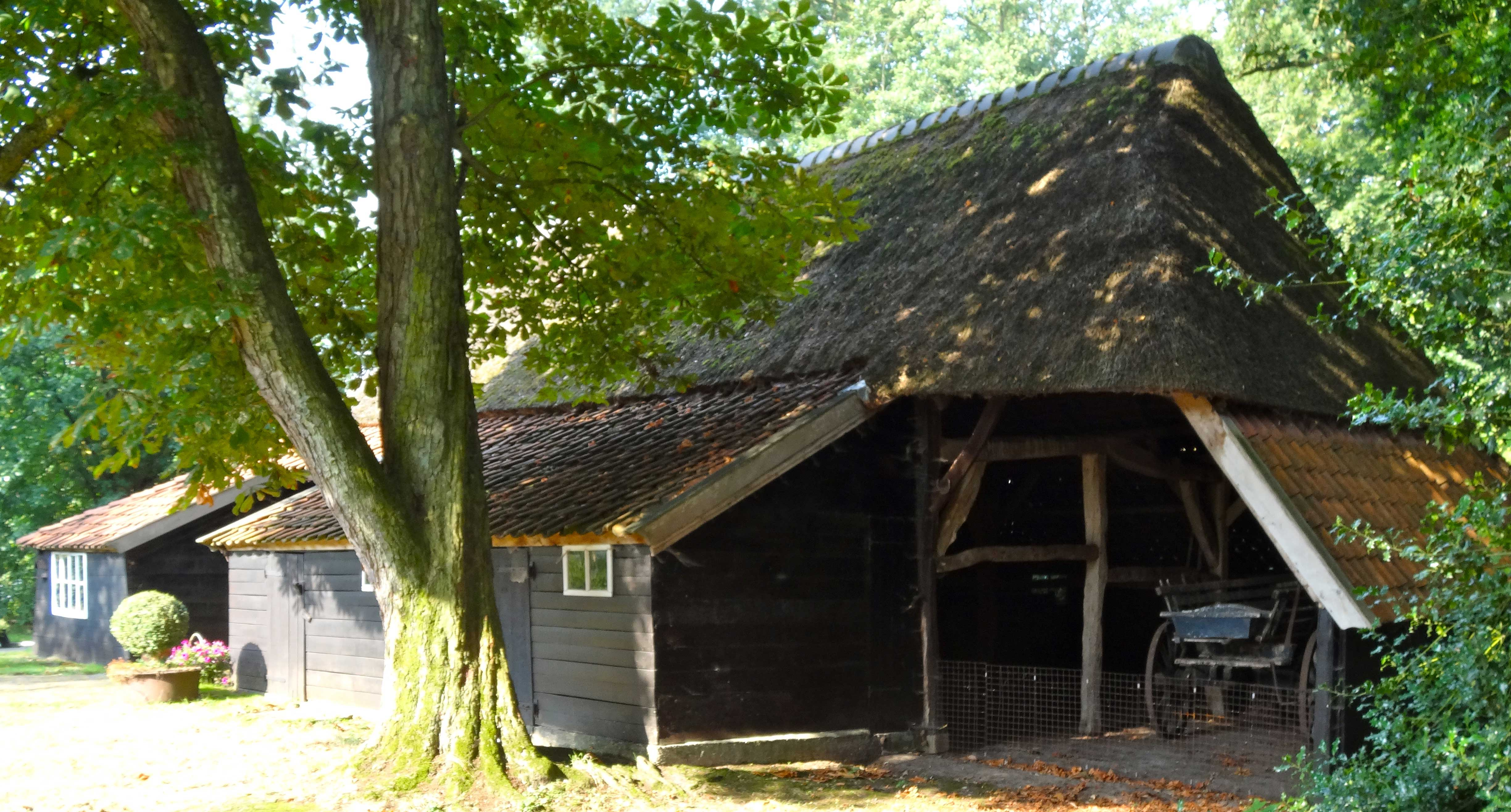
- Farm in Notter

- Location in province of Overijssel in the Netherlands Notter (Netherlands)
- Coordinates: 52°20′00″N 6°31′00″E
- Country: Netherlands
- Province: Overijssel
- Municipality: Wierden

Area
  - Total: 11.43 km^{2} (4.41 sq mi)
- Elevation: 10 m (33 ft)

Population (2021)
  - Total: 590
  - Density: 52/km^{2} (130/sq mi)
- Time zone: UTC+1 (CET)
  - Summer (DST): UTC+2 (CEST)
- Postal code: 7467
- Dialing code: 0548

Notter is a hamlet in the Dutch province of Overijssel. It is located in the municipality of Wierden, about 4 km southeast of the town of Nijverdal.

It was first mentioned in 1297 as Nuthere. The etymology is not clear. It has a statistical entity, and postal code, however it is still considered a hamlet of Wierden. It is twinned with Zuna and shares resources with its neighbour. In 1840, it was home to 367 people.
