= Folkert Velten =

Dutch footballer and coach

Personal information
- Date of birth: 25 August 1964 (age 62)
- Place of birth: Enter, Netherlands

Senior career*
Years	Team	Apps	(Gls)
- Enter Vooruit
1988–1997	Heracles Almelo		

Managerial career
- VV Bergentheim
- Blauw Wit'66
- * Club domestic league appearances and goals

Folkert Velten (born 25 August 1964) is a Dutch former professional football player and coach. A forward, he spent most of his career with Heracles Almelo.

== Career ==
After playing amateur football for Enter Vooruit, he turned professional at the age of 23 after signing with Heracles Almelo. He had previously been offered a contract by the club at the age of 18, but he declined as matches were played on Sundays and this conflicted with his Christian beliefs. Between 1988 and 1997 he scored 221 goals in 377 games for the club. The club moved their games to Saturdays so he could play. He was top scorer in the Eerste Divisie in 1989. He retired from playing after breaking his leg.

== Later life ==
After working as a scout for Heracles, he became a football coach, managing amateur team VV Bergentheim in 2008. In 2012, he worked in the maintenance department at a petting zoo in Enter, and was coach of amateur team Blauw Wit'66.

== Personal life ==
A practising Christian, Velten refused to play football on Sundays. A member of the Dutch Reformed Church, as a child his father wanted him to go to church twice on Sundays. Velten only went once, in the morning, because he would watch and play football in the evening with his siblings.
