= Berthil ter Avest =

Dutch footballer

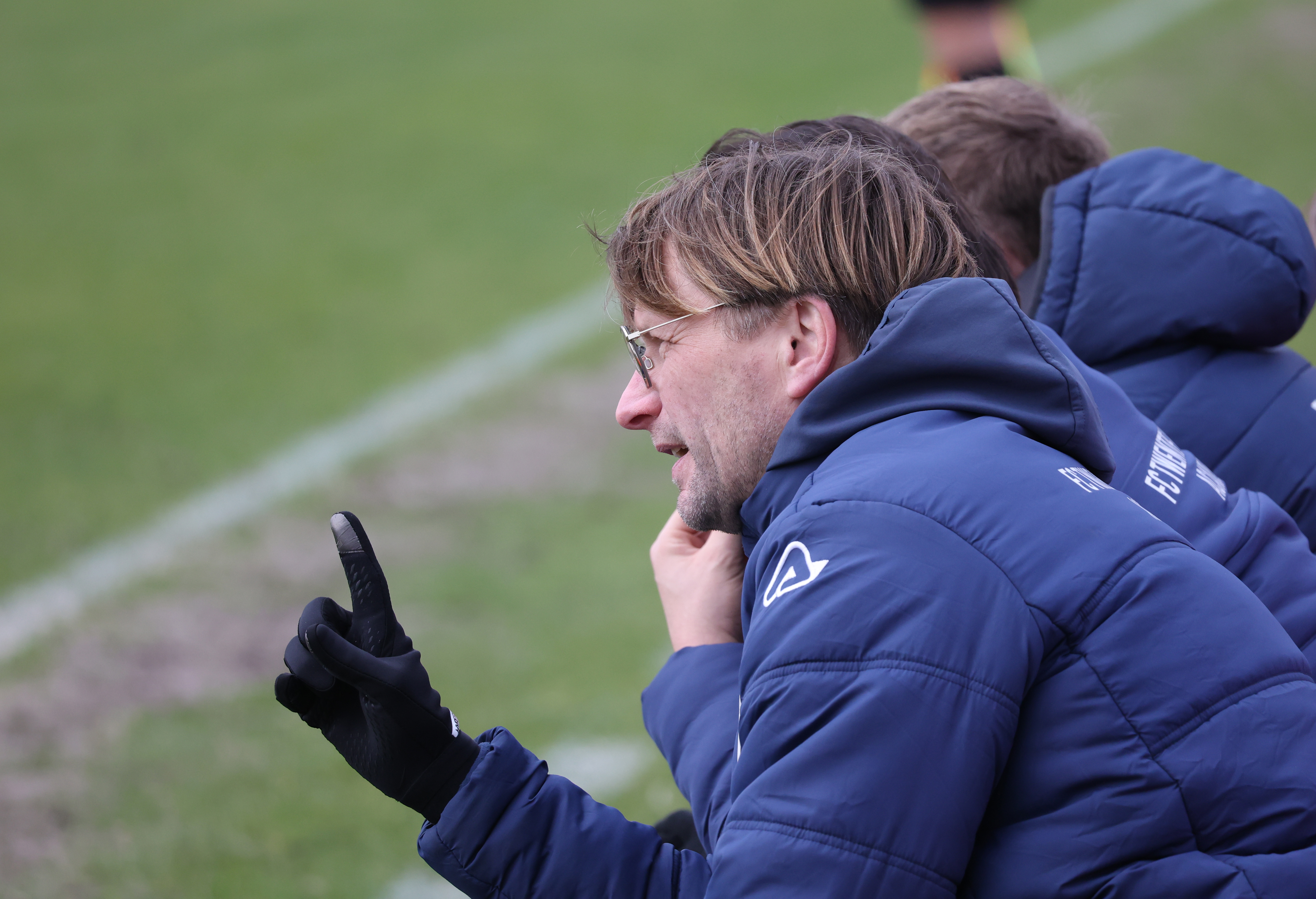

Personal information
- Full name: Bert Dinand ter Avest
- Date of birth: 19 November 1970 (age 55)
- Place of birth: Wierden, Netherlands
- Height: 1.84 m (6 ft 0 in)
- Position: Winger

Youth career
- SVZW Wierden

Senior career*
Years	Team	Apps	(Gls)
1989–1991	FC Twente	47	(8)
1991–1993	Roda JC	58	(9)
1993–1994	→ Groningen (loan)	27	(6)
1994–2000	FC Twente	176	(15)
2000–2002	Borussia Mönchengladbach	21	(1)
2003	De Graafschap	17	(0)
Total		346	(39)
- * Club domestic league appearances and goals

Berthil ter Avest (born 19 November 1970) is a Dutch retired football player. He is head coach of Dutch amateur side Bon Boys.

== Club career ==
In addition to Dutch teams, the left-sided midfielder also played in the Bundesliga for Borussia Mönchengladbach.

He was released by De Graafschap in 2003 and an Achilles injury made him quit playing altogether.
