= Annefleur Kalvenhaar =

Dutch cyclist and mountain biker (1994–2014)

Personal information
- Full name: Annefleur Antonia Kalvenhaar
- Born: June 10, 1994 Wierden, Netherlands
- Died: August 23, 2014 (aged 20) Grenoble, France

Cycling career
- Sport: Cycling
- Disciplines: Road, cyclo-cross & mountainbike
- Role: Rider

Annefleur Kalvenhaar (10 June 1994 – 23 August 2014) was a Dutch cyclist and mountain biker. She won the U23 European Cyclo-cross Championships in 2013. She began her career at the age of 13. She participated for the first time in a World Cup in 2012. In Houffalize and La Bresse she finished second place in the top 10. She was born in Wierden, the Netherlands.

Kalvenhaar died in Grenoble, France, due to an accident during a UCI World Cup XCE race in Méribel, France. She fell during the XC-eliminator, a mountainbike race where 4 participants race a short track. She fell hard on a bridge, and was taken to hospital by helicopter, where she died the next day.

== See also ==
- List of racing cyclists and pacemakers with a cycling-related death
