= Westphalian language =

Low German dialects spoken in Germany

Westphalian
- Westfalish
- Westfäölsk, Westfäälsk, Westföölsk
- Native to: Germany, Netherlands
- Region: Westphalia, southwest Lower Saxony, eastern Netherlands
- Language family: Indo-European: Germanic; West Germanic; North Sea Germanic; Low German; Low Saxon; Westphalian

Language codes
- ISO 639-3: wep
- Glottolog: west2356

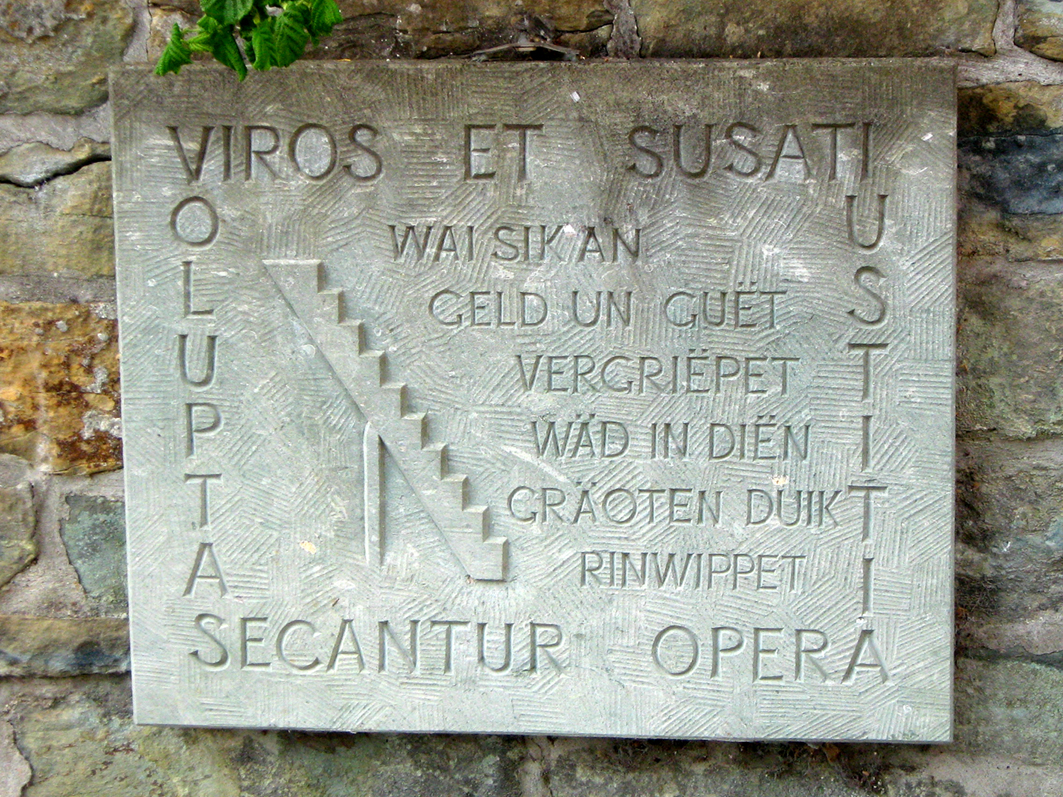
Sign on the Wippe (punishment stone) in Soest: the text in the local Saust dialect reads: Wai sik an geld un guët vergriëpet, wäd in diën gräoten duik rinwippet ('Whoever steals money and possessions, will be tipped into this large pond').

Westphalian or Westfalish (Standard High German: Westfälisch [vɛstˈfɛːlɪʃ], Standard Dutch: Westfaals [ʋɛstˈfaːls]) is one of the major dialect groups of Low German. Its most salient feature is its diphthongization (rising diphthongs). For example, speakers say iäten ([ɪɛtn̩]) instead of etten or äten for "to eat". (There is also a difference in the use of consonants within the Westphalian dialects: North of the Wiehengebirge, people tend to use unvoiced consonants, whereas south of the Wiehengebirge they tend to use the voiced equivalents, e.g. Foite > Foide.)

The Westphalian dialect region includes the north-eastern part of North Rhine-Westphalia, i.e. the former Prussian province of Westphalia, without Siegerland and Wittgenstein, but including the southern part of former government district Weser-Ems (e.g. the region around Osnabrück and the landscape of Emsland in modern Lower Saxony).

Traditionally, all Dutch Low Saxon dialects are considered Westphalian, with the notable exception of Gronings, which is grouped with the Northern Low Saxon and Friso-Saxon dialects. The rising diphthongisation is still noticeable in the dialects of Rijssen, Enter and Vriezenveen. In a band from southeast Twente to northwest Twente the diphthongisation still happens before the consonants v, g and z. Vriezenveen furthermore preserved the diphthongisations in words like to eat, to hope and kitchen. In other areas of Dutch Low Saxon the breaking was monophthongized and then highered and lengthened, resulting in different development stadia away from the breaking depending on the area.

== Varieties ==
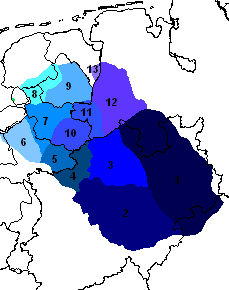
Westphalian dialects

Among the Westphalian language there are different subgroups of dialects:

Westphalian dialects in Westphalia

1. East Westphalian (Ostwestfälisch) in East Westphalia (possibly including the dialect of Osnabrück)
2. South Westphalian (Südwestfälisch)
3. Münsterländisch
4. Westmünsterländisch

Westphalian dialects in the Netherlands:

5. Achterhoeks
6. Veluws
7. Sallands
8. Urkers
9. Drèents
10. Twents

Westphalian dialects in Lower Saxony and Groningen

11. Grafschafter Platt
12. Emsländer Platt
13. Westerwolds

Westphalian has many lexical similarities and other proximities to Eastphalian, extending to the East and slightly to the North of the area where Westphalian is spoken.

== Phonology ==
The Westphalian vowel breaking is a sound change found in many Westphalian dialects. In this process, short vowels in open, stressed syllables are turned into diphthongs, for example:

- iäten / eaten – „(to) eat“
- wieten – „(to) know“
- vuegel – „bird“
- vüegel – „birds“
- kuaken / koaken – „(to) cook“
- hüawe / höäwe – „courtyards“

Originally, these syllables in Old Saxon had short vowels. In other Low German dialects, these vowels were simply lengthened (e.g. Westphalian briäken – North Low Saxon breken).

At the end of the Old Saxon period, final syllables became weakened, so the main stress shifted entirely to the stem syllable. It then became difficult to maintain at the same time the shortness, openness, and strong stress of the vowel. Westphalian solved this by adding another short sound after the original short vowel. This kept the sound system close to the old one.

Even today, Westphalian preserves almost all (7 out of 8) of the original short vowels in open syllables..

In the past, this feature occurred over a larger area, including places like Lippe and the Westmünsterland, where it is no longer found today. Even in dialects without this breaking, the distinctions between the old short vowels are still mostly preserved.

== Grammar ==
Declension

Adjectives

Case/Gender	South Westphalian				East Westphalian				Münsterländisch			
Case/Gender	Masc.	Fem.	Neutr.	Plural	Masc.	Fem.	Neutr.	Plural	Masc.	Fem.	Neutr.	Plural
Strong declension patterns
Nominativ	-en	-e	-∅/-te	-e	-en	-e	-∅/-et	-e	-en	-e	-∅	-e
Genitiv	–	–	–		–	–	–	-er	–	–	–	
Dativ	-en/-em	-er	-en/-em	-en	-en	-e(n)	-en	-en	-en	-e	-∅	-e
Accusative	-en	-e	-∅/-te	-e	-en	-e	-∅/-et	-e	-en	-e	-∅	-e
Weak declension patterns
Nominativ	-e	-e	-e	-en	-e	-e	-e	-en	-e	-e	-e	-en
Genitiv	–	–	–		–	–	–	-er	–	–	–	
Dativ	-en	-en	-en	-en	-en	-en	-en	-en	-en	-e	-e	-en
Accusative	-en	-e	-e	-en	-en	-e(n)	-e	-en	-en	-e	-e	-en

Case/Gender	South Westphalian				East Westphalian				Münsterländisch			
Case/Gender	Masc.	Fem.	Neutr.	Plural	Masc.	Fem.	Neutr.	Plural	Masc.	Fem.	Neutr.	Plural
Strong declension of "lütk" (small/little)
Nominativ	lütken	lütke	lütk	lütke	lütke(n)	lütke	lütk(et)	lütke	lütken	lütke	lütk	lütke
Genitiv	–	–	–		–	–	–	(lütker)	–	–	–	
Dativ	lütkem/lütken	lütker	lütkem/lütken	lütken	lütken	lütke(n)	lütken	lütken	lütken	lütke	lütk	lütke
Accusative	lütken	lütke	lütk	lütke	lütken	lütke	lütk(et)	lütke	lütken	lütke	lütk	lütke
Weak declension of "lütk" (small/small)
Nominativ	dai lütke	dai lütke	dat lütke	dai lütke	de/dai lütke	de lütke	dat/et lütke	de lütken	däi lütke	däi lütke	dat lütke	däi lütke
Genitiv	–	–	–	-	–	–	–	–	–	–	–	-
Dativ	diem lütken	dier lütken	diem lütken	dai lütken	dän/däm lütken	de lütken	dän/däm lütken	dän lütken	den lütken	däi lütke	dat lütke	däi lütken
Accusative	dien lütken	dai lütke	dat lütke	dai lütken	dän lütken	de lütke(n)	dat/et lütke	de lütken	den lütken	däi lütke	dat lütke	däi lütken

=== Personal pronouns ===
Case/Gender		South Westphalian					East Westphalian					Münsterländisch				
Case/Gender		1st	2nd	3rd masc.	3rd fem.	3rd neut.	1st	2nd	3rd masc.	3rd fem.	3rd neut.	1st	2nd	3rd masc.	3rd fem.	3rd neut.
Singular	Nominative	ik	deu (-de, -te)	hai (-he)	sai (-se)	iet (-et, -t)	ik	diu, du	håi, he	såi, se	et, it	ik	du (-de)	häi (-he)	säi (-se)	et (-t)
Singular	Genitive	–	–	–	–	–	muine	duine	–	–	–	-	-	-	-	-
Singular	Dative	mäi	däi	iemme (-me)	ier	iemme (-me)	mui, mi	dui, di	(h)äm, än	üar	äm, än, en	mi	di	em	üör	et (-t)
Singular	Accusative	mik	dik	ienne (-ne)	sai (-se)	iet	mui, mi	dui, di	än, en	såi, se	et	mi	di	em	üör	et (-t)
Plural	Nominative	fäi	äi	säi			wui	jui, ji	såi, se			wi	ji (-ji, -e)	säi (-se)		
Plural	Genitive	–	–	–			iuse	jiue	–			-	-	-		
Plural	Dative	us	ugg	ienne (-ne)			us	jiu, ju	en, üar			us	ju	üör		
Plural	Accusative	us	ugg	säi, se			us	jiu, ju	såi, se			us	ju	säi (-se)		

Possessive Pronouns

South Westphalian
Person	Masc.				Fem.				Neutr.				Plural			
Person	Nom	Gen	Dat	Akk	Nom	Gen	Dat	Akk	Nom	Gen	Dat	Akk	Nom	Gen	Dat	Akk
1. Sg.	mäin	–	mäinem/mäinen	mäinen	mäine	–	mäiner	mäine	mäin	–	mäinem/mäinen	mäin	mäine	–	mäinen	mäine
2. Sg.	däin	–	däinem/däinen	däinen	däine	–	däiner	däine	däin	–	däinem/däinen	däin	däine	–	däinen	däine
3. Sg. masc.	säin	–	säinem/säinen	säinen	säine	–	säiner	säine	säin	–	säinem/säinen	säin	säine	–	säinen	säine
3. Sg. fem.	ier(e)	–	ierem/ieren	ieren	iere	–	ierer	iere	ier(e)	–	ierem/ieren	ier(e)	iere	–	ieren	iere
3. Sg. neutr.	säin	–	säinem/säinen	säinen	säine	–	säiner	säine	säin	–	säinem/säinen	säin	säine	–	säinen	säine
1. Pl.	use	–	usem/usen	usen	use	–	user	use	use	–	usem/usen	use	use	–	usen	use
2. Pl.	ugge	–	uggem/uggen	uggen	ugge	–	ugger	ugge	ugge	–	uggem/uggen	ugge	ugge	–	uggen	ugge
3. Pl.	iere	–	ierem/ieren	ieren	iere	–	ierer	iere	iere	–	ierem/ieren	iere	iere	–	ieren	iere
East Westphalian
Person	Masc.				Fem.				Neutr.				Plural			
Person	Nom	Gen	Dat	Akk	Nom	Gen	Dat	Akk	Nom	Gen	Dat	Akk	Nom	Gen	Dat	Akk
1. Sg.	muin	–	muinen	muinen	muine	–	muine(n)	muine	muin	–	muinen	muin	muine	muiner	muinen	muine
2. Sg.	duin	–	duinen	duinen	duine	–	duine(n)	duine	duin	–	duinen	duin	duine	duiner	duinen	duine
3. Sg. masc.	suin	–	suinen	suinen	suine	–	suine(n)	suine	suin	–	suinen	suin	suine	suiner	suinen	suine
3. Sg. fem.	üar	–	üaren	üaren	üare	–	üare(n)	üare	üar	–	üaren	üar	üare	üarer	üaren	üare
3. Sg. neutr.	suin	–	suinen	suinen	suine	–	suine(n)	suine	suin	–	suinen	suin	suine	suine	suinen	suine
2. Pl.	iuse	–	iusen	iusen	iuse	–	iuse(n)	iuse	iuse	–	iusen	iuse	iuse	iuser	iusen	iuse
1. Pl.	jiue	–	jiuen	jiuen	jiue	–	jiue(n)	jiue	jiue	–	jiuen	jiue	jiue	jiuer	jiuen	jiue
3. Pl.	üar	–	üaren	üaren	üare	–	üare(n)	üare	üar	–	üaren	üar	üare	üarer	üaren	üare
Münsterländisch
Person	Masc.				Fem.				Neutr.				Plural			
Person	Nom	Gen	Objective		Nom	Gen	Objective		Nom	Gen	Objective		Nom	Gen	Objective	
1. Sg.	min	–	minen		mine	–	mine		min	–	min		mine	–	mine	
2. Sg.	din	–	dinen		dine	–	dine		din	–	din		dine	–	dine	
3. Sg. masc.	sin	–	sinen		sine	–	sine		sin	–	sin		sine	–	sine	
3. Sg. fem.	üör	–	üören		üöre	–	üöre		üör	–	üör		üöre	–	üöre	
3. Sg. neutr.	sin	–	sinen		sine	–	sine		sin	–	sin		sine	–	sine	
1. Pl.	use	–	usen		use	–	use		use	–	use		use	–	use	
2. Pl.	jue	–	juen		jue	–	jue		jue	–	jue		jue	–	jue	
3. Pl.	üöre	–	üören		üöre	–	üöre		üöre	–	üöre		üöre	–	üöre	

Reflexive pronouns

While Old Saxon has lost the Germanic third-person reflexive pronoun such as Old English and Old Frisian and instead resorts to the relevant personal pronoun, modern Low German borrows reflexive pronouns from German. In Sauerland, it is conjugated as in Proto-Germanic and Icelandic, while in other Westphalian dialects like Münsterländisch or East Westphalian it is not. In addition, a distinction in South Westphalian is made between the individual genders as well as individual and multiple people. In some dialects, there is still no distinction between reflexive and third-person pronouns in the onjective case.

Person/Case	Südwestfälisch		Ostwestfälisch	Münsterländisch
Person/Case	Accusative	Dative	Accusative/Dative	Object Case
1. Singular	miek	mäi	mui, mi	mi
2. Singular	diek	däi	dui, di	di
3. Singular Mask.	siek	säi	sik	sik
3. Singular Fem.	siek	säi/siek	sik	sik
3. Singular Neutr.	siek	säi	sik	sik
1. Plural	us	us	us	us
2. Plural	uch	uch	jiu, ju	ju
3. Plural	iärk	iärk	sik	sik

Demonstrative Pronouns

Case/Gender	South Westphalian				East Westphalian				Münsterländisch			
Case/Gender	Masc.	Fem.	Neutr.	Plural	Masc.	Fem.	Neutr.	Plural	Masc.	Fem.	Neutr.	Plural
Strong declension patterns
Nominativ	dai	dai	dat	dai	de/dai	de	dat	de	däi	däi	dat	däi
Dativ	diem	dier	diem	dai	dän/däm	de	dän/däm	dän	den	däi	dat	däi
Accusative	dien	dai	dat	dai	dän	-de	dat	de	den	däi	dat	däi

Verbs

Conjugation patterns of East Westphalian

verbs				briäken, "to break"	täin "to pull"	doun, "to do"	gaun, "to go"	helpen, "to help"	küren, "to speak"	willen, "to want/ to become"	kwuomen, "to come"	haulen, "to hold"	skräggen, "to shout"	skäilen, "to scold"	beskriieben, "to describe"	wasken, "to wash"
Infinitive				briäken	täin	doun	gaun	helpen	küren	willen	kwuomen	haulen	skräggen	skäilen	beskriieben	wasken
Participle	Present			briäken	täin	doun	gaun	helpen	küren	willen	kwuomen	haulen	skräggen	skäilen	beskriieben	wasken
Participle	Past			bruoken	tuogen	daun	gaun	holpen	kürt	wolt	kwuom	haulen	skrägget	skuolen	beskriben	wasken
Indicative	Present	Singular	1st person	briäke	tee	doo	goo	helpe	küre	will	kwuome	haule	skrägge	skäile	beskriiewe	waske
Indicative	Present	Singular	2nd person	bräks	tüss	döss	gäis	helps	kürs	wüss	kümms	hölts	skrägges	skäils	beskrifs	waskes
Indicative	Present	Singular	3rd person	briäk	tüt	dött	gäit	helpet	kürt	will	kümmp	hölt	skrägget	skäilt	beskrif	wasket
Indicative	Present	Plural		briäket	teet	doot	goot	helpet	kürt	willt	kwuomet	hault	skrägget	skäilt	beskriiewet	wasket
Indicative	Past	Singular	1st person	broik	toig	dää	göng	hölp	kürede	woll	kweimp	hoilt	skräggede	skoilt	beskreif	waskede
Indicative	Past	Singular	2nd person	broiks	toigs	dääs	göngs	hölpes	küredes	woss	kweimps	hoilts	skräggedes	skoils	beskreifs	waskedes
Indicative	Past	Singular	3rd person	broik	toig	dää	göng	hölp	kürede	woll	kweimp	hoilt	skräggede	skoilt	beskreif	waskede
Indicative	Past	Plural		broiken	toigen	dään	göngen	hölpen	küreden	wollen	kweimen	hoilen	skräggeden	skoilen	beskreiwen	waskeden
Imperative		Singular		briäk	tee	dot	gong	help	kür	wuss	kwumm	haul	skrägge	skäil	beskriiew	waske
Imperative		Plural		briäket	teet	doot	goot	helpet	kürt	willt	kwuomet	hault	skrägget	skäilt	beskriiewet	wasket

Conjugation patterns of Vjens

verbs				bräken, "to break"	dòůn, "to do"	góón, "to go"	helpen, "to help"	wilen, "to want; to become"	hoolen, "to carry"	wasken, "to wash"	biiten, " to bite"	baigen, "to salvage"	waiken, "to work"	biieven, "to quake"	visken, "to fish"
Infinitive				bräken	dòůn	góón	helpen	wilen	hoolen	wasken	biiten	baigen	waiken	biieven	visken
Participle	Present			bräkend	dòůnd	góónd	helpend	wilend	hoolend	waskend	biitend	baigend	waikend	biievend	viskend
Participle	Past			ebräken	edòòn	egóón	ehölpen	ewilt	ehoolen	ewösken	ebjiten	ebjörgen	ewaiket	ebiievet	evisket
Indicative	Present	Singular	1st person	bräke	dòůe	góó	helpe	wil	hoole	waske	biite	baige	waike	biieve	viske
Indicative	Present	Singular	2nd person	brekst	dòůst	geist	helpst	wist	hóólst	waskest	bitst	baigst	waikst	biievst	viskest
Indicative	Present	Singular	3rd person	brekt	dòůn	geiht	helpt	wil	hóólt	wasket	bit	baigt	waikt	biievt	visket
Indicative	Present	Plural		bräkt	dòůt	góót	helpt	wilt	hoolt	wasket	biitt	baigt	waikt	biievt	visket
Indicative	Past	Singular	1st person	brak	dee	göng	hölp	wól	höül	wöske	bjet	björg	waiken	biievde	viskede
Indicative	Past	Singular	2nd person	brakst	deest	göngst	hölpst	wóst	höülst	wöskest	bjetst	björgst	waikenst	biievdest	viskedest
Indicative	Past	Singular	3rd person	brak	dee	göng	hölp	wól	höül	wöske	bjet	björg	waiken	biievde	viskede
Indicative	Past	Plural		brakken	deen	göngen	hölpen	wólen	höülen	wösken	bjeten	björgen	waiken	biievden	viskeden
Imperative		Singular		bräk	dòůe	góó	help	?	hoole	waske	biite	baige	waike	biieve	viske
Imperative		Plural		bräkt	dòůt	góót	helpt	wilt	hoolt	wasket	biitet	baigt	waikt	biievt	visket

Subjunctive

However, compared to most other dialects, the Westphalian dialect has preserved an extremely complex conjugation of strong verbs with subjunctive.

Infinitive	Simple Past	Westphalian subjunctive 2
suin (to be)	Ik was (I was)	ik wöre (I would be)
bluiven (to stay)	he blaiw (he stayed)	he bliewe (he would stay)
kriupen (to crawl)	he kraup (he crawled)	he krüäpe (he would crawl)
soöken (to search)	he sochte (he searched)	he söchte (he would search)
wieten (to know)	he wus (he knew)	he wüsse (he would know)

Infinitive 2

In the very south of the East Westphalian language area, the original gerund of the West Germanic languages has been formally preserved.

Infinitive form	Gerund form
maken (to make)	to makene
kuoken (to cook)	to kuokene
schniggen (to snow)	to schniggene

=== Nouns ===
East Westphalian and South Westphalian dialects have also preserved the so-called dative-e, adding a final -e to masculine and neuter nouns in the dative case, while Münsterländisch does not preserve it.

English	Proto-West Germanic	East Westphalian	Münster Westphalian	Westfrisian	Dutch	German
the desk	diskē	den diske	den disk	-	-	dem Tisch
the day	dagē	den dage	den dag	de dei	de dag	dem Tag
the market	markatē	den markede	den market	de merk	de markt	dem Markt
the swine	swīnē	den swiene	dat swien	it swyn	het zwijn	dem Schwein
the water	watarē	den watere	dat water	it wetter	het water	dem Wasser

== Status ==
German Westphalian is currently spoken mostly by elderly people. The majority of the inhabitants of Westphalia proper speak (regionally coloured) standard German. This accent, however, does not stand out as much as for example Bavarian, because Westphalia is closer to the Hanover region, whose speech variety is generally considered to be standard modern German.

The Low Saxon dialects in the bordering Twente and Achterhoek regions in the east of the Netherlands are traditionally classified as Westphalian dialects, albeit with some notable traits from Standard Dutch. A 2005 study showed 62% of the population of Twente spoke the language at home or together with Dutch, and efforts are made to insert the language into the local school curriculum.

One of the reasons for the diminishing use of Westphalian in Germany is the rigorous enforcement of German-only policies in traditionally Low German-speaking areas during the 18th century. Westphalian, and Low German in general, unlike many of the High German dialects, were too distant from standard German to be considered dialects and were therefore not tolerated and efforts were made to ban them. In an extreme case, Hannover and its hinterland were forced to adopt rather unnaturally a form of German based on the written standard.

Westphalian was spoken in Kruppwerke up to the 19th century.

Nevertheless, the Westphalian regiolect of Standard High German includes some words that originate from the dying Westphalian dialects, which are otherwise unintelligible for other German speakers from outside Westphalia. Examples include Pölter [ˈpœltɐ] "pyjamas/pajamas", Plörre [ˈplœʁə] "dirty liquid", and Mötke [ˈmœtkə] "mud, dirt".

== Authors ==
Westphalian authors include:

Münsterländisch:

- Augustin Wibbelt

East Westphalian:

- Richard Knoche

South Westphalian:

- Wilhelm Bleicher
- Wilhelm Bröcker
- Theodor Ellbracht
- Friedrich Wilhelm Grimme
- Walter Höher
- Carl Hülter
- Fritz Kuhne
- Fritz Linde
- Horst Ludwigsen
- Franz Nolte
