= Urkers dialect =

Westphalian dialect of Flevoland, Netherlands

Urkers
- Urks
- Native to: Netherlands
- Region: Urk
- Language family: Indo-European: Germanic; West Germanic; North Sea Germanic; Low German; Low Saxon; Westphalian; Gelders-Overijssels; Urkers

Language codes
- ISO 639-3: urs (rejected)
- Glottolog: urke1234
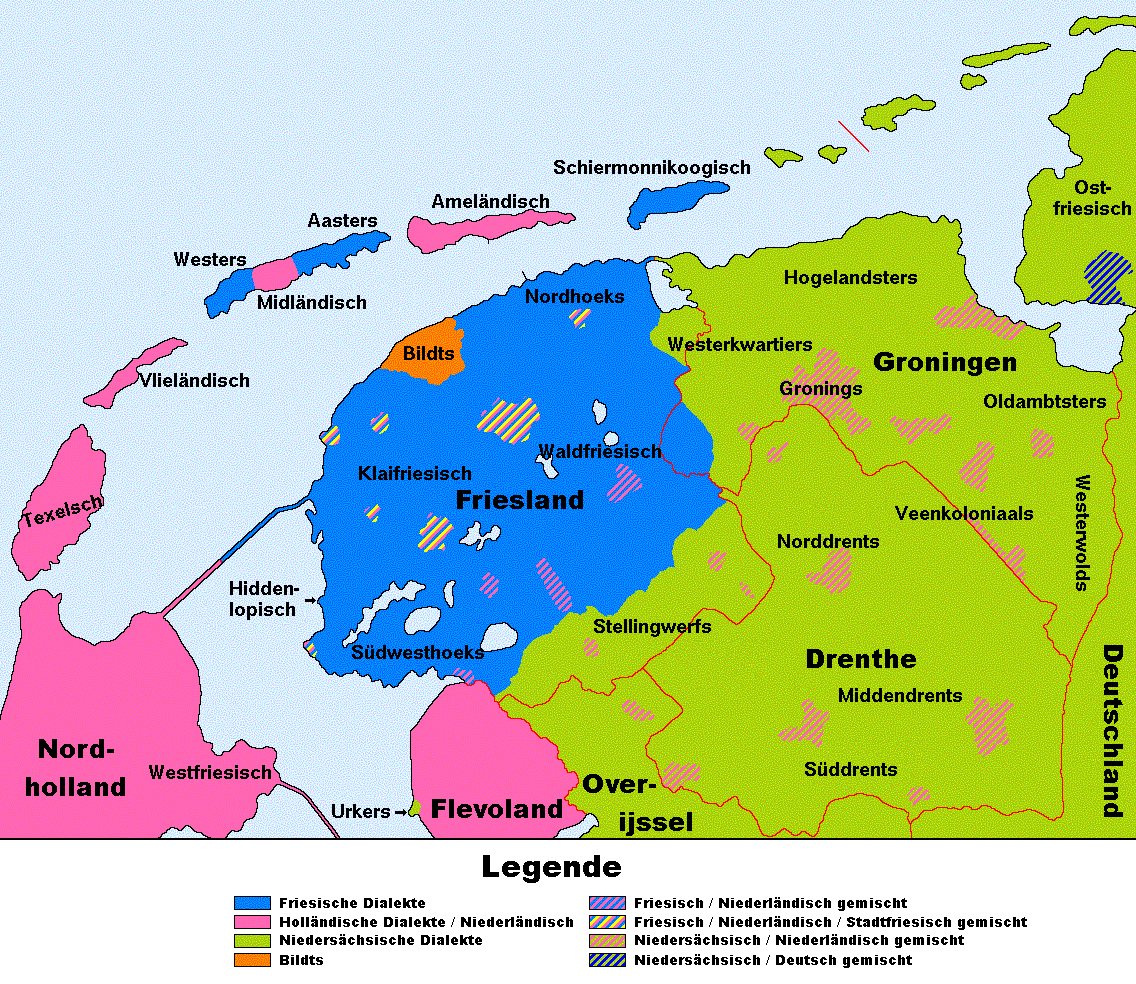
- A dialect map of the northern Netherlands. Urkers is the green bit at the western tip of the pink area at the bottom center.

Urkers is the local language of the municipality and former island of Urk, located on the west coast of the Dutch province of Flevoland. Urk was an island until the middle of the 20th century. It was originally located in the Zuiderzee, a bay of the North Sea, which became an inland sea called IJsselmeer when a dam was built to secure the Dutch coast against floods. Inhabitants of Urk had been mostly fishermen and still predominantly make their living from North Sea fishing.

Urkers is part of the dialect continuum that links Westphalian dialects in the North and East of Urk to the Lower Franconian dialects, mainly in the South, West, and North-West of Urk. Standard Dutch, and Afrikaans are also part of the Lower Franconian group. Urkers is considered a part of the Low Saxon group of languages despite the fact that it is quite extreme in that group and both geographically and linguistically at its edge.

== Authors ==
The author Gerrit Pasterkamp has written books in Urkers, including translations of the Jewish and Christian Psalms and belletristic works. At least one band, Leuster, publishes some of their songs sung in Urkers on CD.

== Documentation ==
There is a crowdsourced online dictionary of Urkers and Dutch. The Urkers Dialect Circle has a small website collecting data on Urkers, including sample texts. See Websites, below.

== Recognition ==
A request to have an ISO 639-3 code assigned to Urkers was rejected due to incomplete treatment of the scope the rest of Low Saxon.

== Literature ==
- Section Urks in the Book by Harrie Scholtmeijer: Taal in stad en land: Utrechts, Veluws en Flevolands, Sdu Uitgevers, Den Haag 2002, ISBN 90-12-09008-3
