= Weitmar-Mitte =

City statistical area

Weitmar-Mitte is a statistical area of the city of Bochum in the Ruhr area in North Rhine-Westphalia in Germany. Weitmar-Mitte is a more affluent area close to the inner city. Weitmar-Mitte borders to Weitmar-Mark and other parts of Bochum.
