= Wilsum =

- Small city
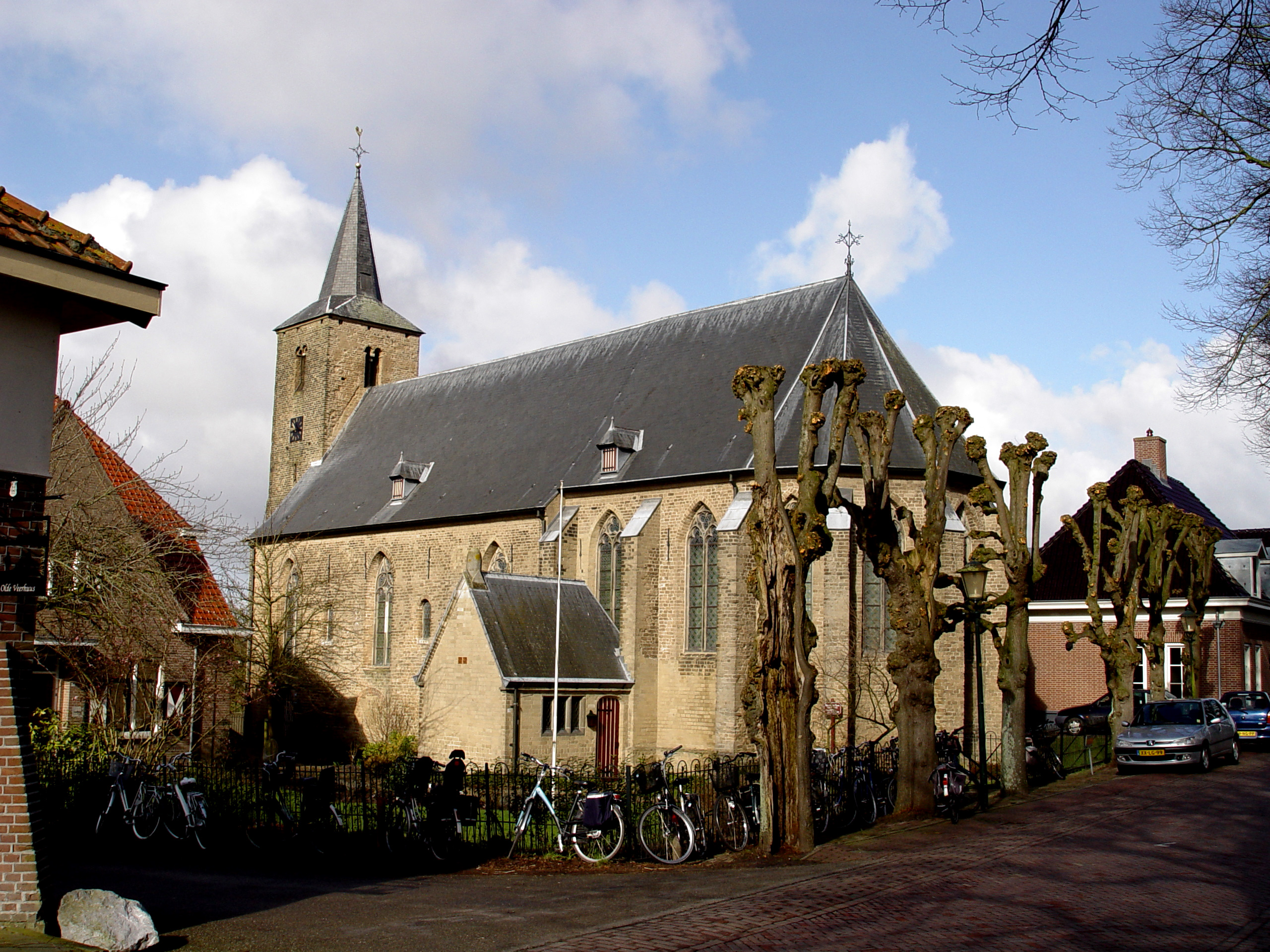
- Wilsum

- Location in the province of Overijssel in the Netherlands Wilsum (Netherlands)
- Coordinates: 52.5281°N 5.9661°E
- Country: Netherlands
- Province: Overijssel
- Municipality: Kampen

Area
  - Total: 6.33 km^{2} (2.44 sq mi)
- Elevation: 0.1 m (0.33 ft)

Population (2021)
  - Total: 870
  - Density: 140/km^{2} (360/sq mi)
- Time zone: UTC+1 (CET)
  - Summer (DST): UTC+2 (CEST)
- Postal code: 8274
- Dialing code: 038

Wilsum is a small city in the Dutch province of Overijssel. It is located in the municipality of Kampen, about 4 km southeast of that city.

== History ==
The city was first mentioned in 1213 as Wilsem, and means "settlement of Willa (person)". Wilsum developed on the dike along the IJssel River. Wilsum received city rights in 1331.

The Dutch Reformed church was built in the middle of the 11 century. The spire dates from 1837. The tower probably served as a place of refuge as well, because the top can only be reached by a ladder. Thanks to several restorations (the last one being between 1980 and 1983) the church is still in a very good state.

In 1527, a sconce was built near the city, however it was destroyed the next year. Wilsum was home to 435 people in 1840.

Wilsum was a separate municipality until 1937, when it became a part of IJsselmuiden.
