= Enter, Netherlands =

Enter
- Village
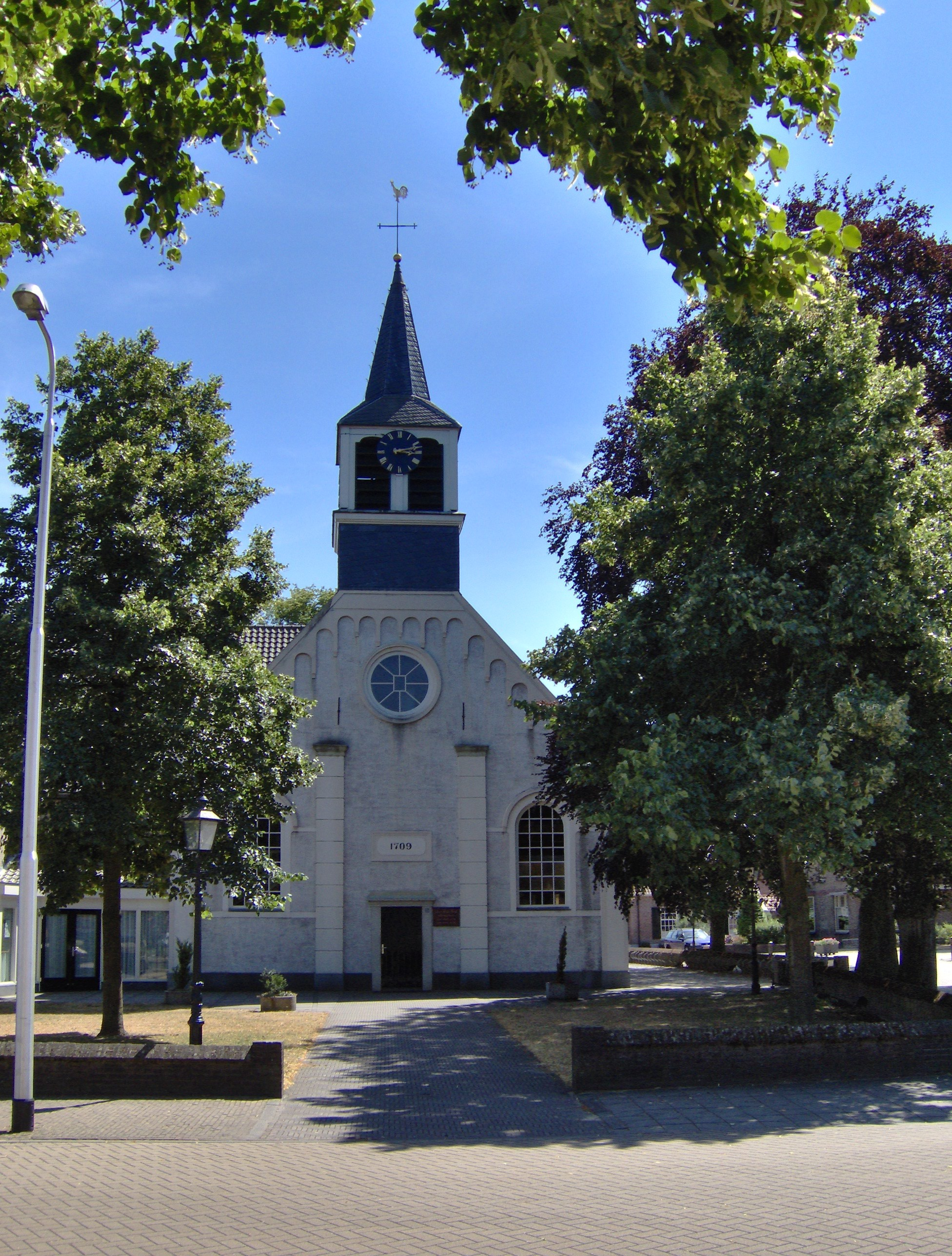
- The Dutch reformed church in Enter, 1709

- Flag Coat of arms

- Location in province of Overijssel in the Netherlands Enter (Netherlands)
- Coordinates: 52°17′39″N 6°34′39″E
- Country: Netherlands
- Province: Overijssel
- Municipality: Wierden

Area
  - Total: 2.47 km^{2} (0.95 sq mi)
- Elevation: 12 m (39 ft)

Population (2021)
  - Total: 5,515
  - Density: 2,230/km^{2} (5,780/sq mi)
- Time zone: UTC+1 (CET)
  - Summer (DST): UTC+2 (CEST)
- Postal code: 7468
- Dialing code: 0547

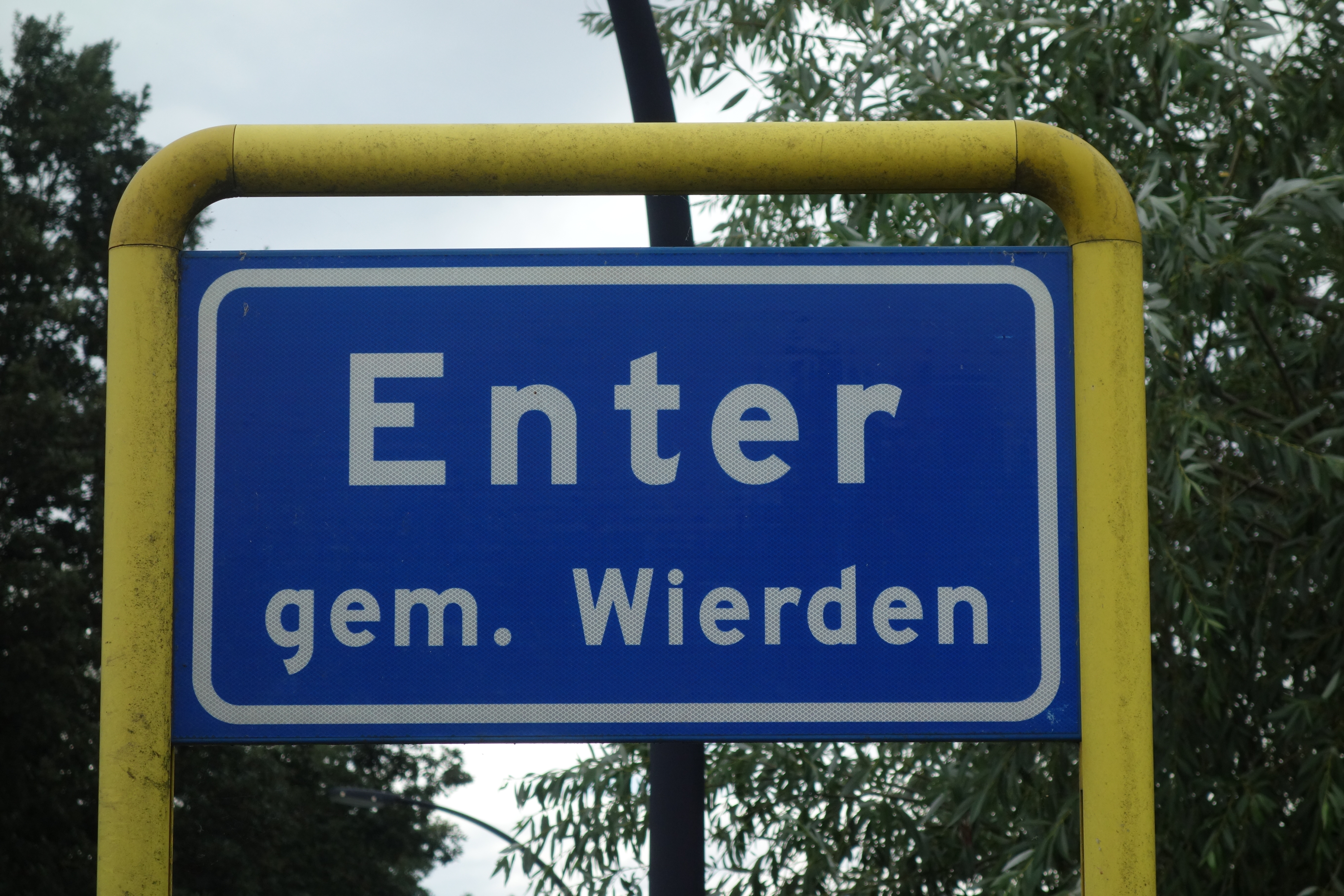
Enter

Enter (Low German: Eanter) is a village in the eastern Netherlands. Enter is located in the municipality of Wierden, Overijssel, between Almelo, Goor, Bornerbroek and Rijssen. In 2021, it was home to 5,515 inhabitants.

== History ==
The history of the town dates back to approximately 1200, when the name of Enter first appeared in writings. The people of Enter were mainly occupied as gooseherd or wooden shoe manufacturers. Furthermore, Enter was the center for the construction of a certain type of ships, called Zomp, in the 18th century and the 19th century. Numerous buildings reminding of this time have been demolished recently, to make space for new buildings.

== The town ==
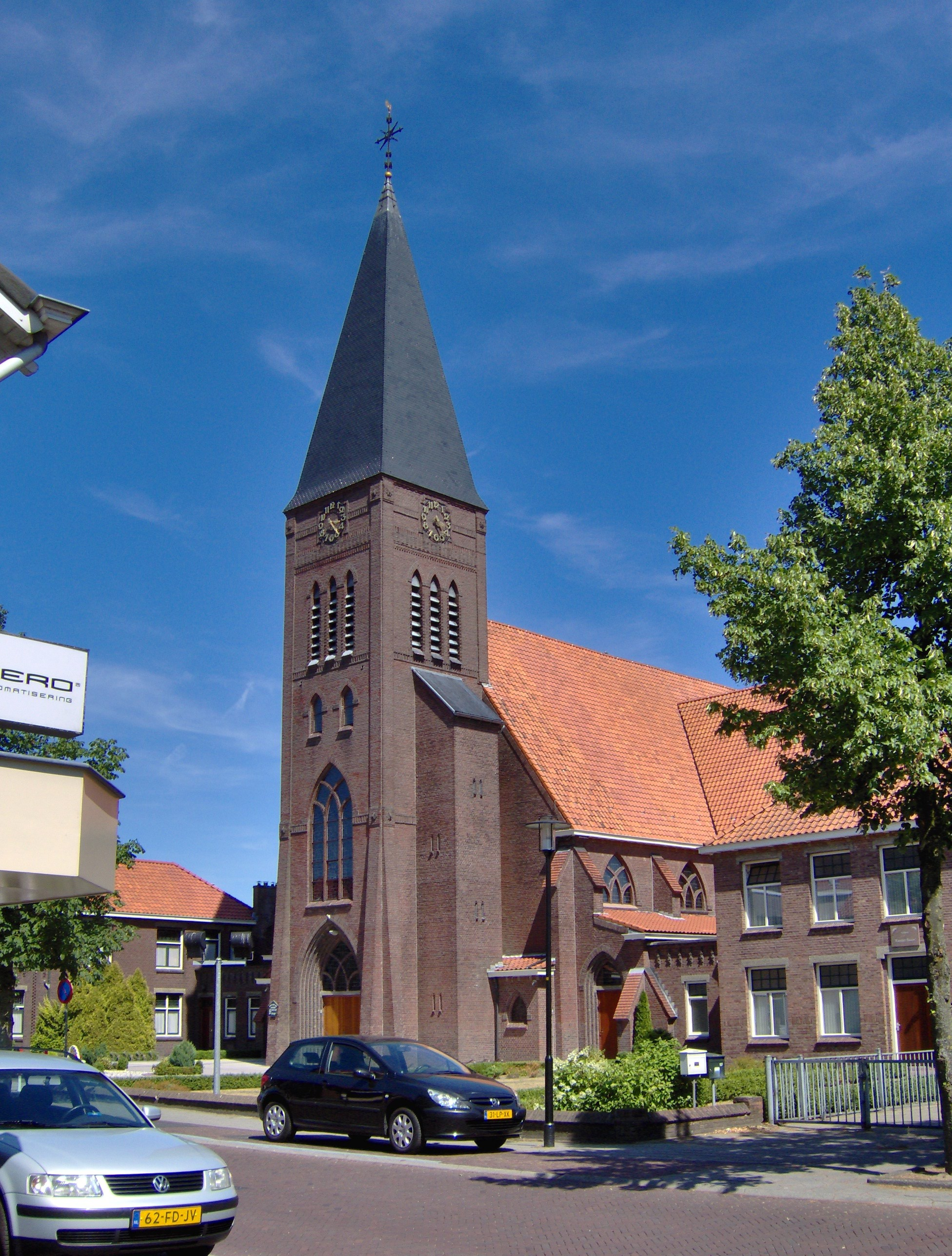
The Roman Catholic church in Enter

The village has experienced a significant growth in both inhabitants and size in recent years. For a long time, the village was mainly situated along the main road and the roads leading to Goor, Rijssen and Wierden. The surrounding area was mainly made up of grass lands. Around 1940 the village underwent a growth period. The new buildings were mainly terraced houses. Around 1975 a second period of growth started, leading to the village as it is known today.

The new development de Goorens stretches from Enter in the direction of Goor and Bornerbroek. The district Goorens was completed in short time around 1980. Much of the streets in this district are named for old farms in the region of Enter, such as: Erve Smedinck and Erve Effinck. The new development de Akkers (around 100 houses) was finished in 2007. Mid-2007/2008 construction of the new development de Berghorst will start. This is a project of the municipality of Wierden. There is also a lot of building activity in the center of the town. Old buildings are replaced with new buildings.

== Population ==
=== Religion ===
In comparison with surrounding villages, a large percentage of the inhabitants is Roman Catholic or not religious.

The village has a number of churches:

- a Roman Catholic church
- a Reformed Church
- a Dutch Reformed Church
- a church of the Netherlands Reformed Congregations

The Reformed Church and the Dutch Reformed Church joined the Protestant Church in the Netherlands (PKN) on May 1, 2004.

=== Traditions ===
Like many villages in Twente and the Achterhoek, the indigenous population of Enter have nicknames like Broeze (Velten family), Timmerjans (Schuitemaker), Saaltink (another branch of the Velten family), Boone (Roetgerink), Pöppen (Mekenkamp), Knibbelhein (Hein Waanders), Stiems (ter Steege), Streef (an area just outside the village) and De Moane (Manenschijn or Moonshine). A difference with the other villages is that much of the nicknames in Enter are not derived from the name of the farm of the family.

The tradition of wooden shoe manufacturing is still maintained in Enter. Therefore, Enter is often credited as the "Klompendorp" (Wooden Shoe village).

=== Character of the inhabitants and tongue ===
People from Enter are proud of their accent, their culture and their village, but are very obstinate. The accent in Enter differs greatly from surrounding villages.

=== Politics ===
Voters in Enter are more progressive and left oriented in comparison to surrounding villages.

For information about the municipality politics, see Wierden.

== Amenities ==
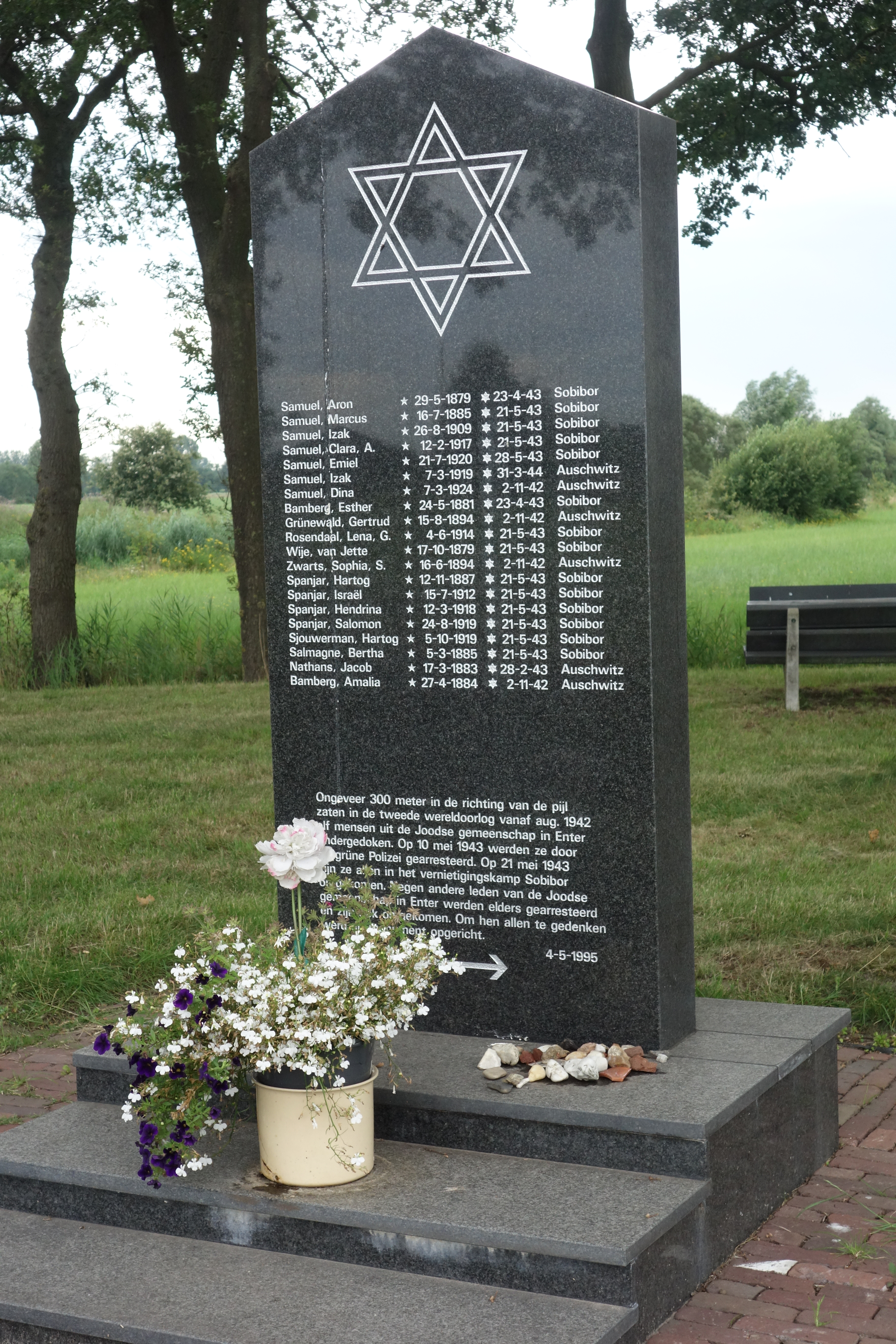
Memorial WW2

=== Shops ===
The center of Enter comprises a wide range of shops, including several clothes stores, three supermarkets, pharmacies, bookshops, electric shops, florists, and a butcher.

=== Education ===
The village has four Primary schools; De Wegwijzer, De Roerganger (both Protestant), and the Catholic De Talenter, formed after a merger of the Jozefschool and the Mariaschool. Furthermore, the hamlet of Ypelo has its own school, the Akkerwal.

=== Healthcare ===
Enter has several doctors, maternity nurses and home care nurses. There is also a pharmacy.

=== Graveyards ===
The village has three graveyards, two of which are no longer in use.

=== Culture ===
Enter has two annual events, the horse market and a carnival. There is a weekly market on the townsquare.

Enter has several cultural companies: a dramatic arts company, several choirs, music companies, artistic groups and a creative center: 't Zumpke.

=== Sports ===
The Gymnastics association Raduga offers sports varying from jazz dance to gymnastics. Furthermore, the village houses soccer clubs Enter Vooruit and s.v. Enter, the volleyball club Holyoke, and a tennis club.

The village is located along the European hiking route E11, locally known as the Marskramerpad or Handelsweg. The E11 runs all the way from Den Haag to the east, at the present time all the way to the border between Poland and Lithuania.

== Economy ==
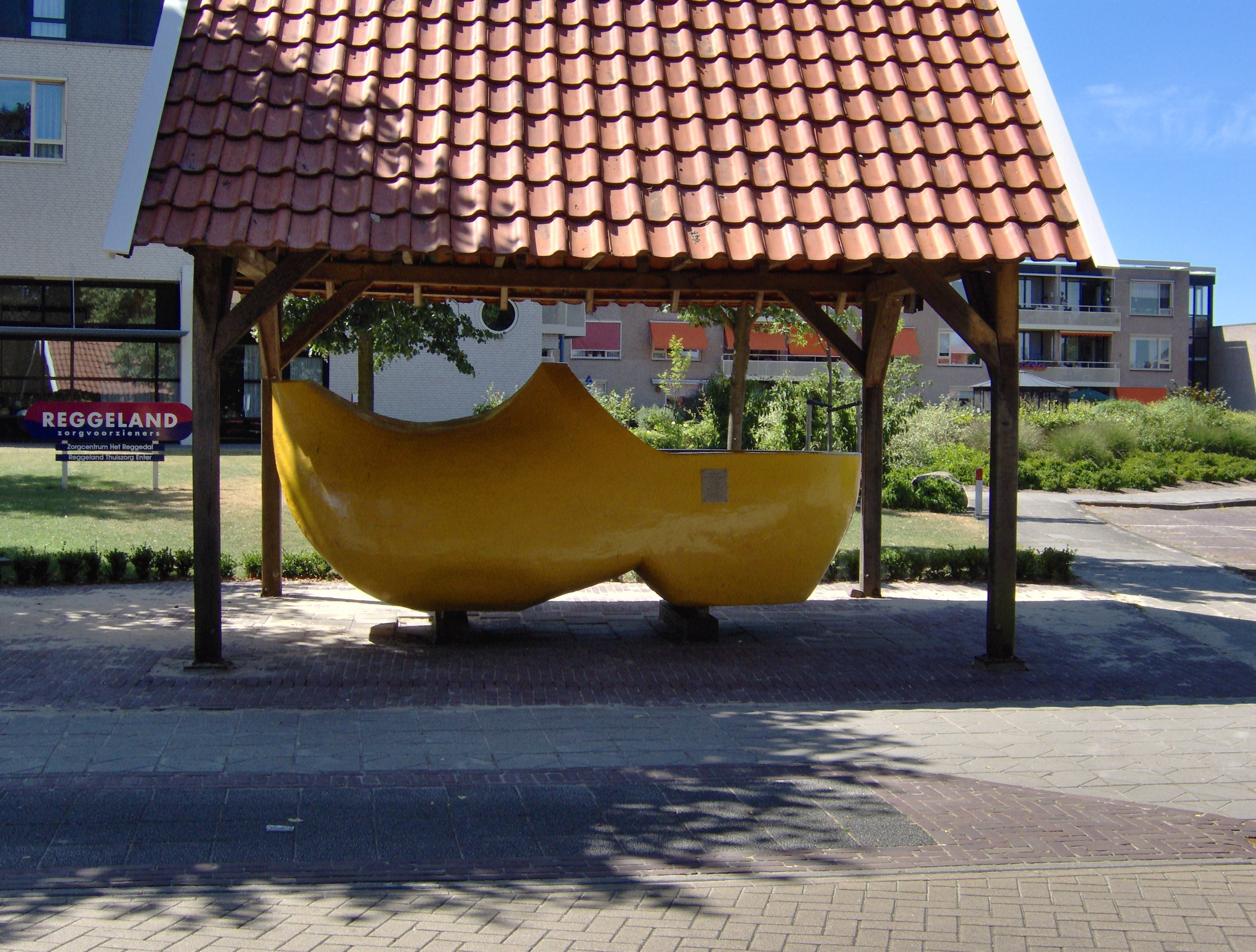
The biggest wooden shoe in the world from one piece of timber, 403 cm (159 in) long, 171 cm (67 in) wide and 169 cm (67 in) high, is located in Enter

=== Tourism ===
The village has several tourist accommodations. There is also a museum, focused on special wooden shoes and the ships that used to be manufactured in the village. Furthermore, a biking route is created in the surroundings of de Lee.

The biggest wooden shoe in the world from one piece of timber is located in Enter.

=== Industry ===
Enter has a favourable location along the Motorway A1 (Amsterdam-Hengelo) and the Provincial road N347 (Rijssen-Goor). Many nationally and internationally oriented businesses are established on the business park de Vonder.

== Famous people from Enter ==
- Folkert Velten (soccer player for Heracles Almelo)
- Hennie Stamsnijder (cyclist)
- Tom Stamsnijder (cyclist)
- Bert Boom (cyclist)
- Erik Braamhaar (referee)
- Steven Lammertink (cyclist)
- Maurits Lammertink (cyclist)
- Hendrik Frederik Clopper
