= Fransum =

- Hamlet
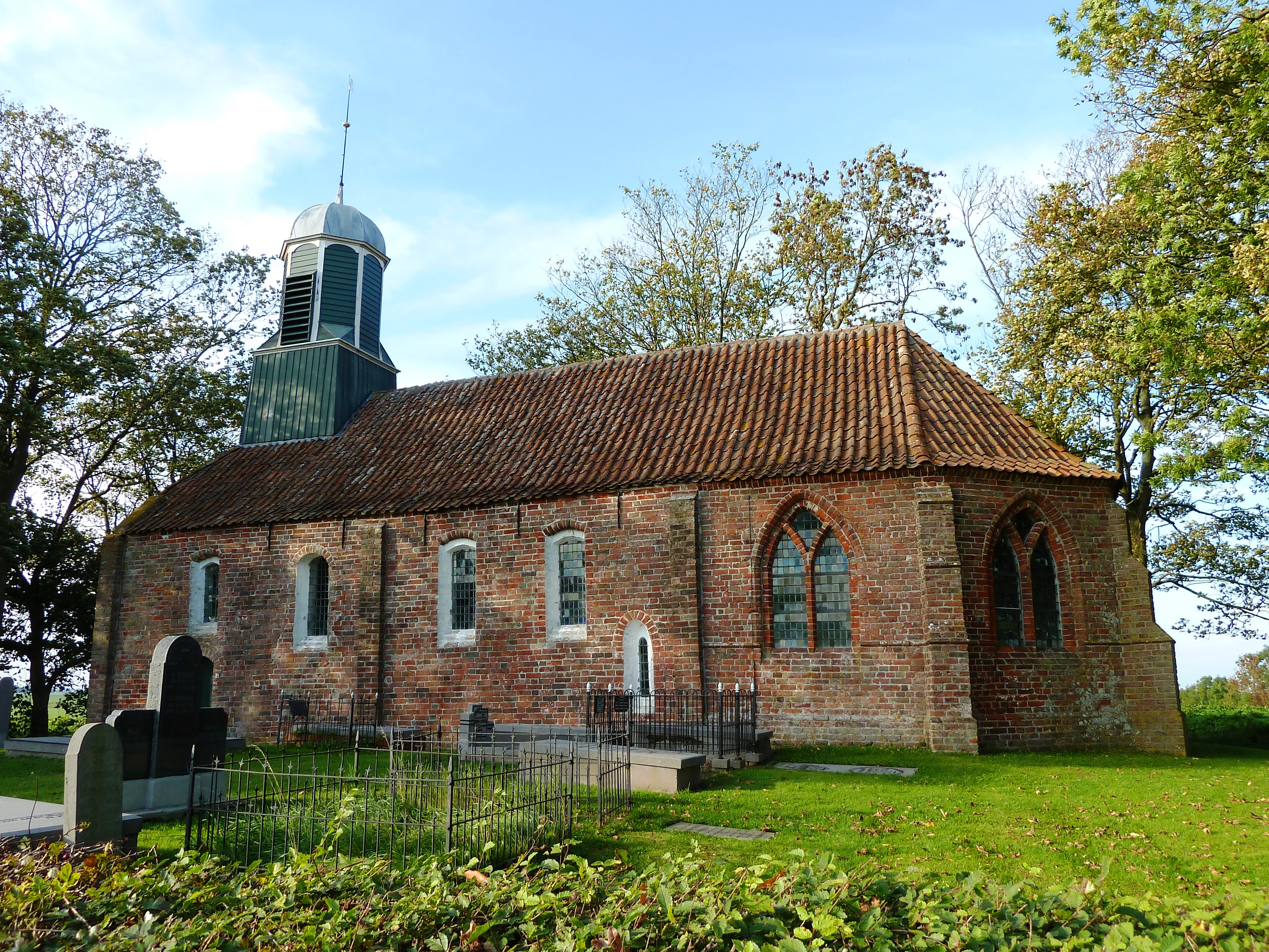
- The church of Fransum

- Location of Fransum in the province of Groningen Fransum (Netherlands)
- Coordinates: 53°16′41″N 6°26′50″E
- Country: Netherlands
- Province: Groningen
- Municipality: Westerkwartier
- Time zone: UTC+1 (CET)
  - Summer (DST): UTC+2 (CEST)
- Postal code: 9833
- Dialing code: 050

Fransum (Gronings: Fraansum) is an old church hamlet in the municipality of Westerkwartier, Netherlands. The village in the north-east of the country contains an early 13th century Romanesque church, a farm and a house.

The hamlet was first mentioned in 1285 as Frenchem in Hunesgonia, and probably means "settlement of Frank (person)". The explanation "settlement of the Franks" is unlikely due to the k → s shift. Archaeological excavations have discovered artefacts from the 5th until the 8th century in the terp. Also bodies have been discovered which are older than the 13th century church. The church is currently in use for weddings, expositions and concerts due to the excellent acoustics.

From Den Ham a narrow road leads to the wierde, with the last part being unpaved. A dodenweg, or 'death road', runs across the wierde from north to south. From Fransum there used to be church paths to Aduard, Altenaauw, Beswerd and Den Ham. Many of these paths disappeared later, but some have been restored as bike paths.

Fransum is not a statistical entity, and the postal authorities have placed it under Den Ham. Fransum was home to 166 people in 1840. Nowadays, it consists of three buildings and a dozen farms in the surrounding area.

== Gallery ==
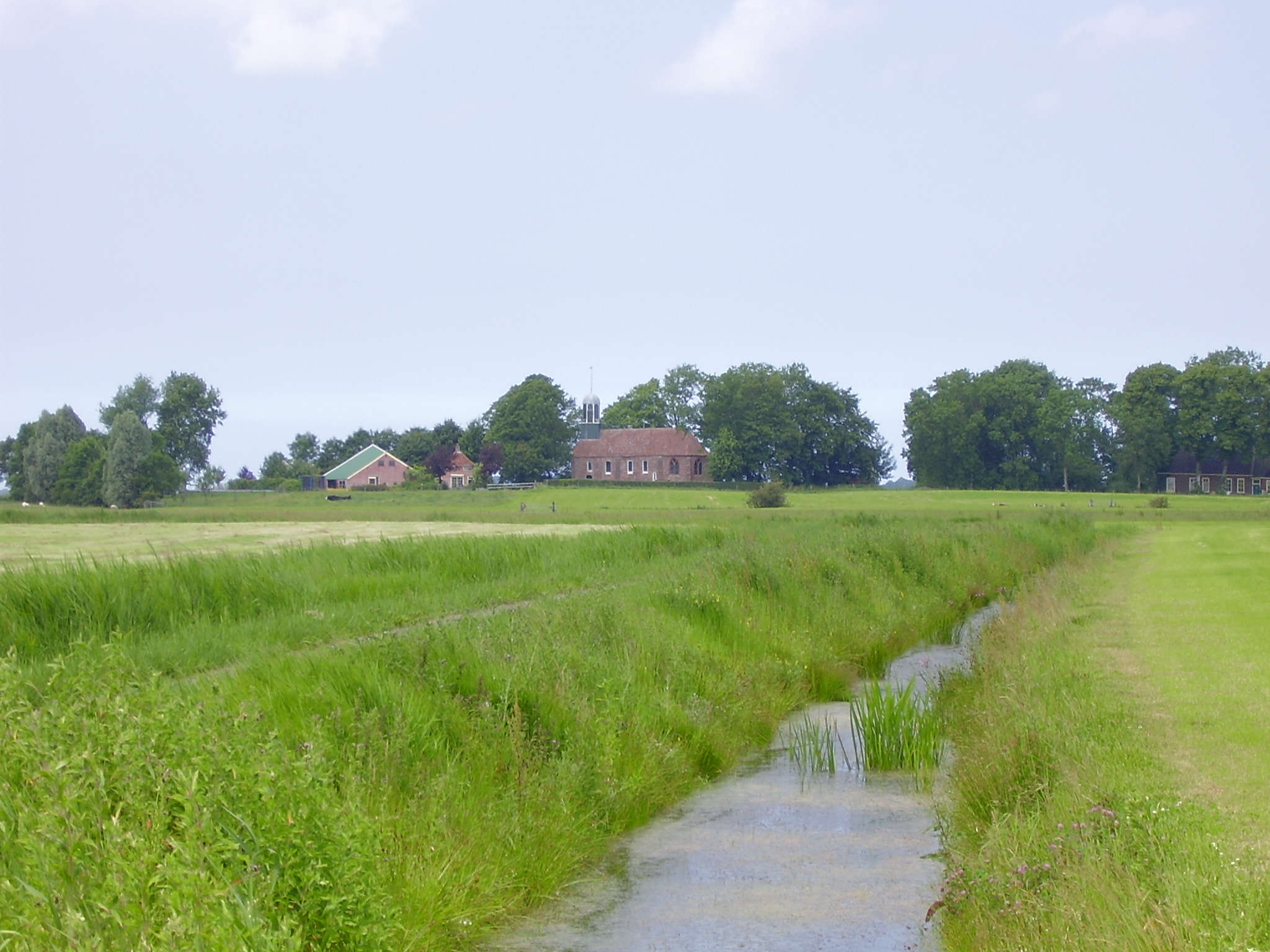
View on Fransum

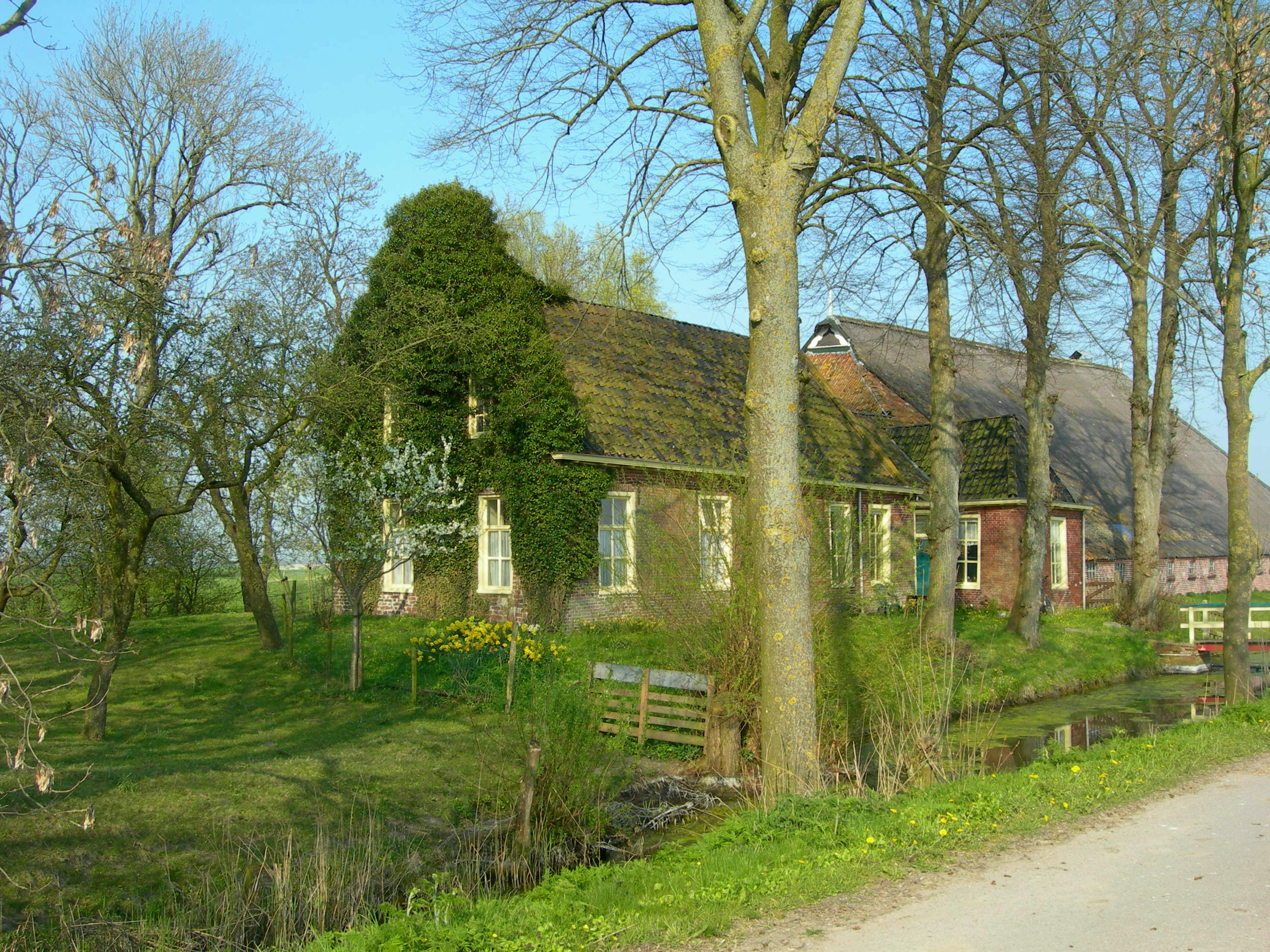
Farm in Fransum

== Bibliography ==
- Meinema, J. (1997), Fransum: uit de geschiedenis van Fransum en zijn kerk. Onnen: 't Widde Vool. 31 p.
- IJzerman, M.J. et al. (1996), Den Ham en Fransum door de jaren heen. Bedum: Profiel. 94 p.
