= Herberg Onder de Linden =

Coordinates: 53°15′29.63″N 6°27′27.31″E

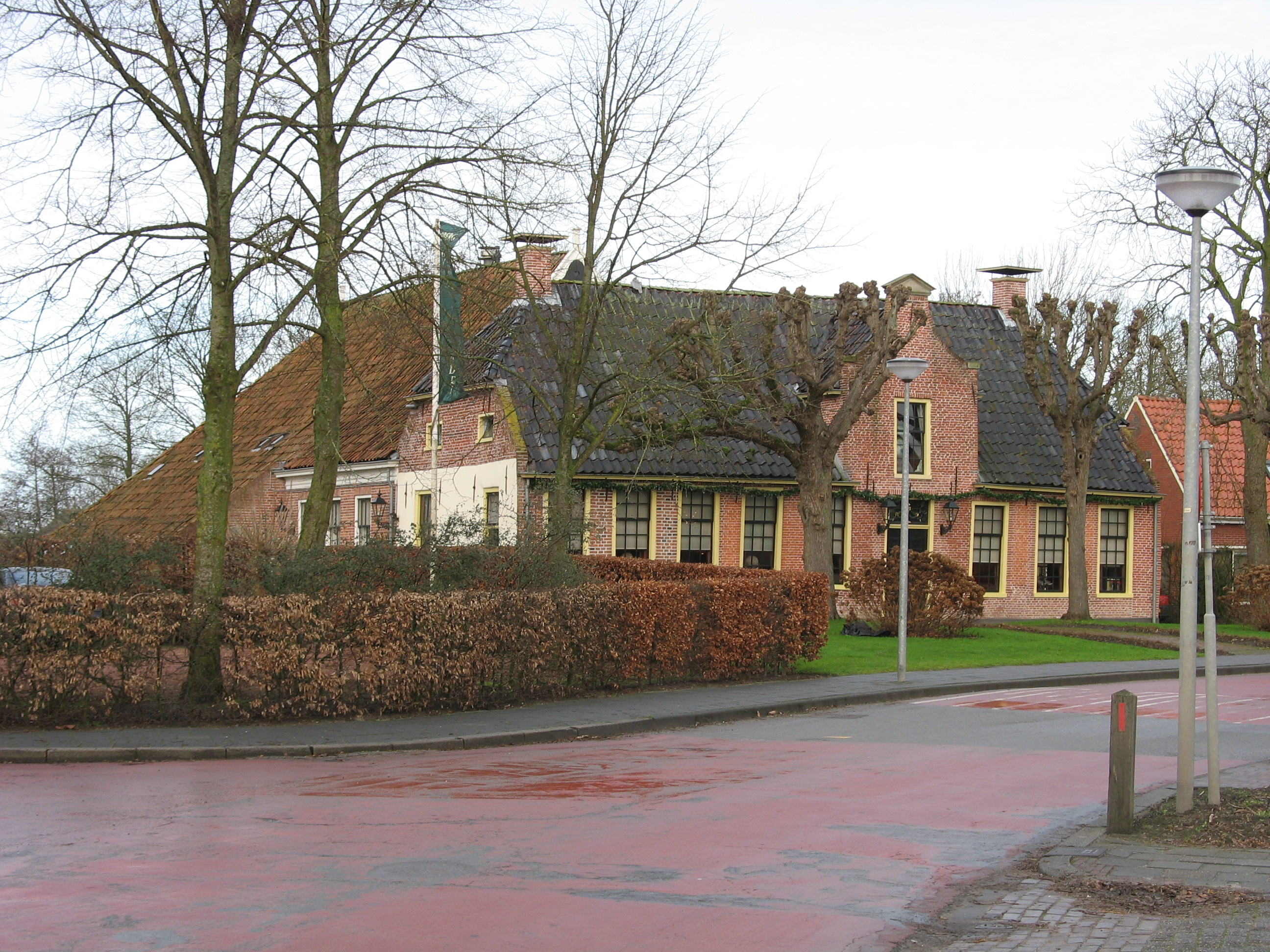
- Interactive map of Herberg Onder de Linden

Restaurant information
- Established: 1991
- Head chef: Geerhard Slenema
- Food type: French
- Rating: Michelin Guide
- Location: Burgemeester van Barneveldweg 3, Aduard, 9831 RD, Netherlands
- Seating capacity: 25
- Website: Official website

Herberg Onder de Linden is a restaurant located in Aduard, in the Netherlands. It is a fine dining restaurant that holds a Michelin star rating since 1992. GaultMillau awarded the restaurant 16.0 out of 20 points.

The restaurant is in fact a continuation of Le Mérinos d'Or, a former Michelin-starred restaurant in Groningen.

Onder de Linden had from the start a Michelin-star. This because head chef Geerhard Slenema could bring the Michelin-star with him from Le Mérinos d'Or. In 1992, the restaurant got a star based on its own merits.

Herberg Onder de Linden is a former tavern, built in 1735. Geerhard Slenema and his wife Petra bought the tavern in 1990, after the building had been empty and neglected for three years. They renovated it and renamed the building to the present name.

On 7 July 2016 it was announced that Slenema, then 65 years old, wanted to retire. He announced the closure of Herberg Onder de Linden. He also announced the sale of the property to fellow Michelin-starred restaurant In de Molen, that has grown out of its housing in Onderdendam. The new restaurant started on 2 November 2016, retaining its name and star.

== See also ==
- List of Michelin starred restaurants in the Netherlands
