= Le Mérinos d'Or =

Coordinates: 53°12′59.99″N 6°33′32.67″E

- Interactive map of Le Mérinos d'Or

Restaurant information
- Head chef: Geerhard Slenema
- Rating: Michelin Guide
- Location: A-straat 1, Groningen, 9718 CP, Netherlands

Rôtisserie Le Mérinos d'Or was a restaurant in Groningen, in the Netherlands. It was a fine dining restaurant that was awarded one Michelin star in 1985 and retained that rating until 1991.

In 1977, the restaurant was owned by mr. Fr. Graaiman. Geerhard Slenema bought the restaurant, at that time a bistro, in 1978 and turned it slowly into a fine dining-restaurant.

Le Mérinos d'Or joined the Alliance Gastronomique Néerlandaise in 1986.

Owner and head chef Geerhard Slenema sold the restaurant in 1990, to open Herberg Onder de Linden in Aduard in 1991.

== See also ==
- List of Michelin starred restaurants in the Netherlands
