= Bremian dialect =

Low German dialect

Bremian
- Bremer Platt
- Native to: Germany
- Region: Bremen
- Ethnicity: Germans
- Native speakers: Around 421,909
- Language family: Indo-European: Germanic; West Germanic; North Sea Germanic; Low German; Low Saxon; Northern Low Saxon; Oldenburgisch; Bremian
- Writing system: Latin

Language codes
- ISO 639-3: None (mis)
- Glottolog: None

The Bremian dialect (Low German: Bremer Platt) is the dialect of Low German spoken in the city of Bremen. It comes from the Oldenburgisch dialect.

== Classification ==
Bremian is classified as a Northern Low Saxon dialect since it derives from the Oldenburgisch dialects. This means that it comes from West Low German. Bremian also shares the most mutual intelligibility with the Northern Oldenburgisch dialect.

It also means that Bremian's "sister dialects" are the aforementioned Northern Oldenburgisch dialect, which is spoken in the former County of Oldenburg, and is a more pure dialect and Jeverland Oldenburgisch, spoken in the Jeverland area of East Frisia, which has influences from East Frisian Low Saxon.

== Features ==
=== Phonology and orthography ===
For Bremen, Heymann postulates the following phoneme inventory:

- Short vowels: a /a/, i /ɪ/, u /ʊ/, e /ə/, e /ɛ/, o /ɔ/ and their umlauts ö /œ/ and ü /ʏ/, the former being rare and the latter tending towards i /ɪ/
- Long vowels: aa (ah,a) /ɔ:/, ie (i) /i:/, uu (uh, u) /u:/, oo (oh, o) /o:/, ee (eh, e) /e:/, e (ä) /ɛ:/ and their umlauts ö /œ:/ (umlaut to aa /ɔ:/, jyounger ä /æ:/~/ɛ:/), öö (öh,ö) (umlaut to aa /o:/, younger ee /e:/), üü (üh, ü, umlaut to younger /u:/) /y:/. Here too, Bremen tends to eliminate the umlaut.
- Diphthongs: ei /aɪ̯/ (partly from older eu (oi) /ɔɪ̯/), au /aʊ̯/
- Liquid: l /l/, m /m/, n /n/, r /r/
- Semivowels j /j/, w (v)
- Fricatives: f /f/, s /s/, s /z/, h /h/, ch /x/, sch /ʃ/
- Plosives: g /g/, k /k/, d /d/, t /t/, b /b/, p /p/
- Affricates: z (tz) /ts/ only in loanwords, j /dʒ/ as allophone of j /j /,

Consonants		Labial	Alveolar	Postalveolar/Palatal	Velar	Glottal
Nasal		m	n			
Plosive	Fortis	p	t		k	
Plosive	Lenis	b	d		g	
Fricative	Fortis	f	s	ʃ <sch>	x <ch>	h
Fricative	Lenis		z <s>			
Affricate			t͡s <z, tz>	(dʒ)		
Approximant		w		j	(w)	
Liquid			l, r			

Vowels	Front	Central	Back
Close	iː <ie, i>		uː <uu, uh, u>
Close	yː <üü, üh, ü>		uː <uu, uh, u>
Near-close	ɪ <i>		ʊ <u>
Near-close	ʏ <ü>		ʊ <u>
Close-mid	eː <ee, eh, e>	ə <e>	oː <oo, oh, o>
Open-mid	ɛ <e>, ɛː <e, ä>	ə <e>	ɔ <o>, ɔː <aa, ah, a>
Open-mid	œ <ö>, œː <öö, öh, ö>	ə <e>	ɔ <o>, ɔː <aa, ah, a>
Open	a		
Diphthong	aɪ̯ <ei>		aʊ̯ <au>

Notes:

- The tendency of Bremen to eliminate umlauts is region-specific and does not apply to North Low Saxon as a whole, which would follow Sass (1956).

=== Morphology ===
==== Conjugation ====
For the Bremen dialect according to Heymann:

	1.sg	2.sg	3.sg	1.pl	2.pl	3.pl
weak conjugation: stöten "to push"
ind.prs.	stott	stottst	stott	stott	stott	stott
ind.prt.	stottde	stottdest	stottde	stottden	stottden	stoddten
ipv.		stöt			stott	
part.prt.	stot't					
strong conjugation: fangen "catch"
ind.prs.	fang	fangst	fangt	fangt	fangt	fangt
ind.prt.	fung	fungst	fung	fungen	fungen	fungen
ipv.		fang			fangt	
part.prt.	fungen					
strong conjugation: binnen "to bind"
ind.prs.	binn	binnst	binnt	binnt	binnt	binnt
ind.prt.	bunn	bunnst	bunn	bunnen	bunnen	bunnen
ipv.		binn			binnt	
part.prt.	bunnen					
strong conjugation: helpen "to help"
ind.prs.	help	helpst	helpt	helpt	helpt	helpt
ind.prt.	hulp	hulpst	hulp	hulpen	hulpen	hulpen
ipv.		help			helpt	
part.prt.	hulpen					
strong conjugation: breken "to break"
ind.prs.	brek	brekst	brekt	brekt	brekt	brekt
ind.prt.	brook	brookst	brook	braken	braken	braken
ipv.		brek			brekt	
part.prt.	braken					
strong conjugation: eten "to eat"
ind.prs.	et	etst	et't	et't	et't	et't
ind.prt.	eet	eetst	eet't	eten	eten	eten
ipv.		et			et't	
part.prt.	eten					
strong conjugation: graben "to dig"
ind.prs.	graaf	graafst	graaft	graaft	graaft	graaft
ind.prt.	groof	groofst	groof	graben	graben	graben
ipv.		graaf			graaft	
part.prt.	graben					
strong conjugation: snieden "to cut"
ind.prs.	snie	sniest	sniet	sniet	sniet	sniet
ind.prt.	sneed	sneedst	sneed	sne(d)en	sne(d)en	sne(d)en
ipv.		snie			sniet	
part.prt.	sne(d)en					
strong conjugation: krupen "to crawl"
ind.prs.	kruup	kruupst	kruupt	kruupt	kruupt	kruupt
ind.prt.	kroop	kroopst	kroop	krapen	krapen	krapenkrapen
ipv.		kruup			kruupt	
part.prt.	krapen					

The present participle is often used as an adjective and is regularly formed with -nd ( staanden Fotes "how things went and stood"), but the -d is often omitted.

==== Declination ====
===== Nouns =====
According to Heymann, the following applies to Bremen:

	m.sg.	n.sg.	f.sg.	pl.
nom.	-∅	-∅	-e or -∅	-e
gen.	es	es	-e or -∅	-e
dat.	e	e	-e or -∅	-en
akk.	-∅	-∅	-e or -∅	-e

===== Personal pronouns =====
According to Heymann, the following applies to Bremen:

	1.	2.	3.m.	3.f.	3.n.	refl.
nom.sg.	ik	du	he	se	it	
gen.sg.	(miner)	(diner)	(siner)	(ehrer)	(siner)	
dat.sg.	mi	di	em	ehr, se	it	sik
akk.sg.	mi	di	em	ehr, se	it	sik
nom.pl.	wi	ji	se			
gen.pl	(user)		(ehrer)			
dat.pl	uus	jo (älter jou)	jem			sik
akk.pl.	uus	jo (älter jou)	jem, se			sik

According to Heymann, ehr refers more to a person, se more to a thing of the female sex and jem more to persons.

===== Demonstrative pronouns =====
According to Heymann, the following applies to Bremen:

	m.	f.	n.	pl.
de "the"
nom.	de	de	dat	de
gen.	des (det)	der	des (det)	der
dat.	den	der	den	de
akk.	den	de	dat	de
disse "this"
nom.	disse	disse	dit (disset)	disse
gen.	(disses)	disser	(disses)	disser
dat.	dissen	disser	dit	dissen
akk.	dissen	disse	dit	disse

=== Syntax ===
==== Genitive ====
The genitive has largely disappeared from use in Bremen, replaced by paraphrases with von "from" or the possessive genitive, e.g., arme Lüde ehr Pankoken. It is preserved especially in adverbial expressions, e.g., siner Wege gahn "to go one's way" and in family names (Badendamms' Dochter "a daughter from the Bavendamm family").

==== Accusative and dative ====
For Bremen according to Heymann: Accusative and dative have partially merged. For pronouns, the merger is complete. For masculine nouns, the dative ending is optional, so that accusative forms are always permissible as datives. For neuter and feminine nouns, the difference in the article forms remains, although mostly only in enclitic forms (uut 'n Huse, up 'r Karken , but in the full form the accusative form applies: uut dat Huus, uut de Karken). After to, dative forms are sometimes found (to'm besten geben).

In contrast, dative forms are more common in written language, because "many people are now abusing the dative, which is based on a misunderstanding of the current state of development of the Low German dialect and, in the conscious or unconscious effort to give their language a more refined character, excessively frequently carries the dative from High German into the Low German representation. ... [I]n particular, in written representation, the accusative should be chosen instead."

==== Sentence structure ====
According to Heymann, "the current Low German sentence structure (...) is so strongly influenced by High German that it differs little from it; however, the harsher paratactic sentence structure that is particularly characteristic of the latter (=the Middle German!) should not be disdained either."

== See also ==
- Hamburg German
- East Frisian Low Saxon
- Dutch Low Saxon

== Bibliography ==
- Heymann, Wilhelm (1909). "Das bremische Plattdeutsch: eine grammatische Darstellung auf sprachgeschichtlicher Grundlage" (in German).
