= Den Ham, Westerkwartier =

Den Ham
- Village
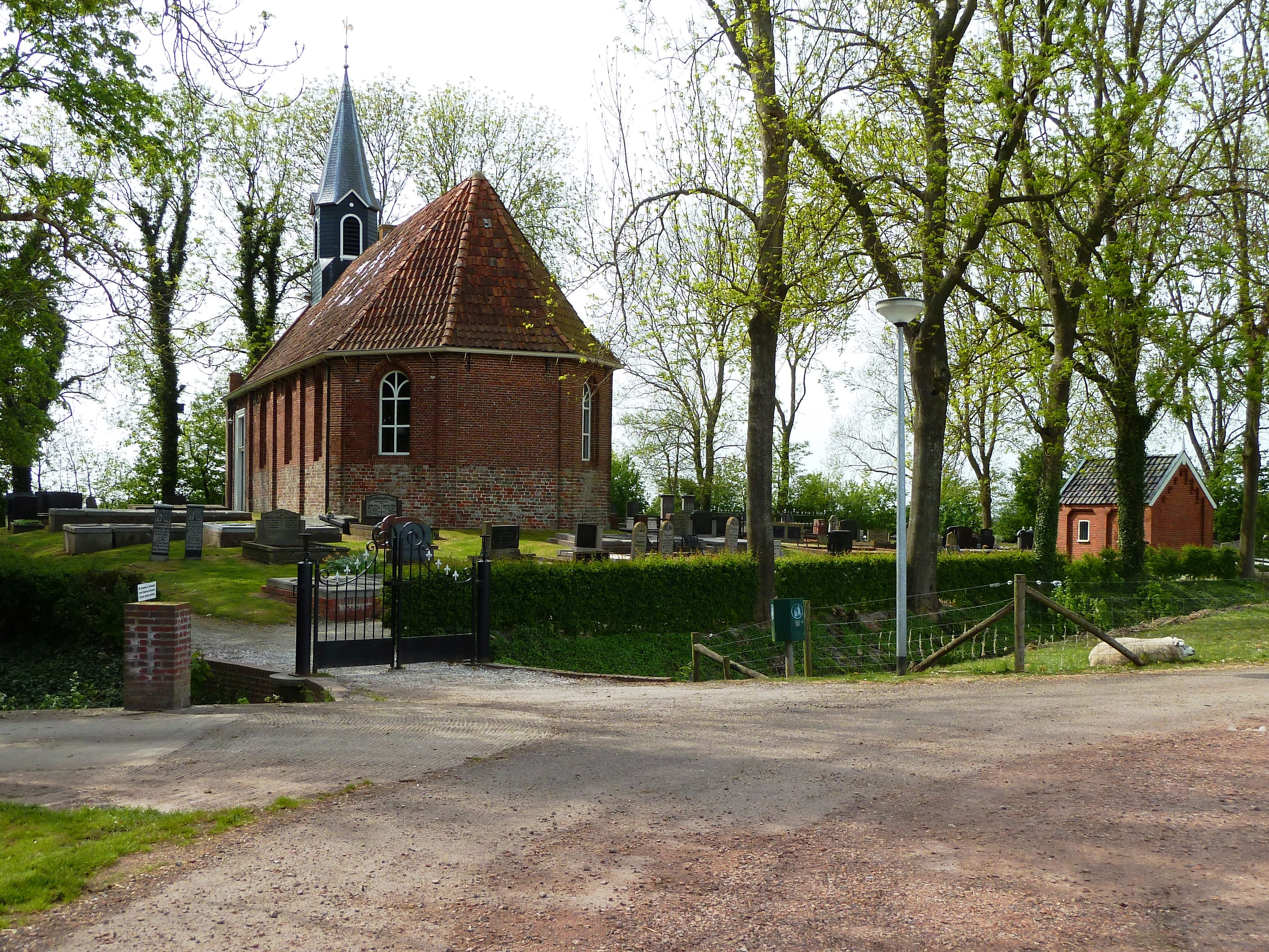
- Reformed Church

- Location of Den Ham in the province of Groningen Den Ham (Netherlands)
- Coordinates: 53°16′23″N 6°25′41″E
- Country: Netherlands
- Province: Groningen
- Municipality: Westerkwartier

Area
  - Total: 0.41 km^{2} (0.16 sq mi)
- Elevation: 1.0 m (3.3 ft)

Population (2021)
  - Total: 140
  - Density: 340/km^{2} (880/sq mi)
- Time zone: UTC+1 (CET)
  - Summer (DST): UTC+2 (CEST)
- Postal code: 9883
- Dialing code: 0594

Den Ham is a linear village in the municipality of Westerkwartier in the Netherlands province Groningen. The village lies on the road from Aduard to Saaksum.

== History ==
The village was first mentioned around 1475 as Horham. The current name means "bend in a waterway". The etymology of the earliest form is unclear. De Ham is a road village which developed on the Aduard to Saaksum road in the Late Middle Ages as a linear settlement.

The current Dutch Reformed church dates from 1729, however, part of the wall is from its 1555 predecessor. The church was renovated in 1912 after a lightning strike which caused a fire.

Den Ham was home to 341 people in 1840. The village was part of the municipality of Aduard until 1989, when it became part of Zuidhorn. In 2019, it became part of Westerkwartier.

== Gallery ==
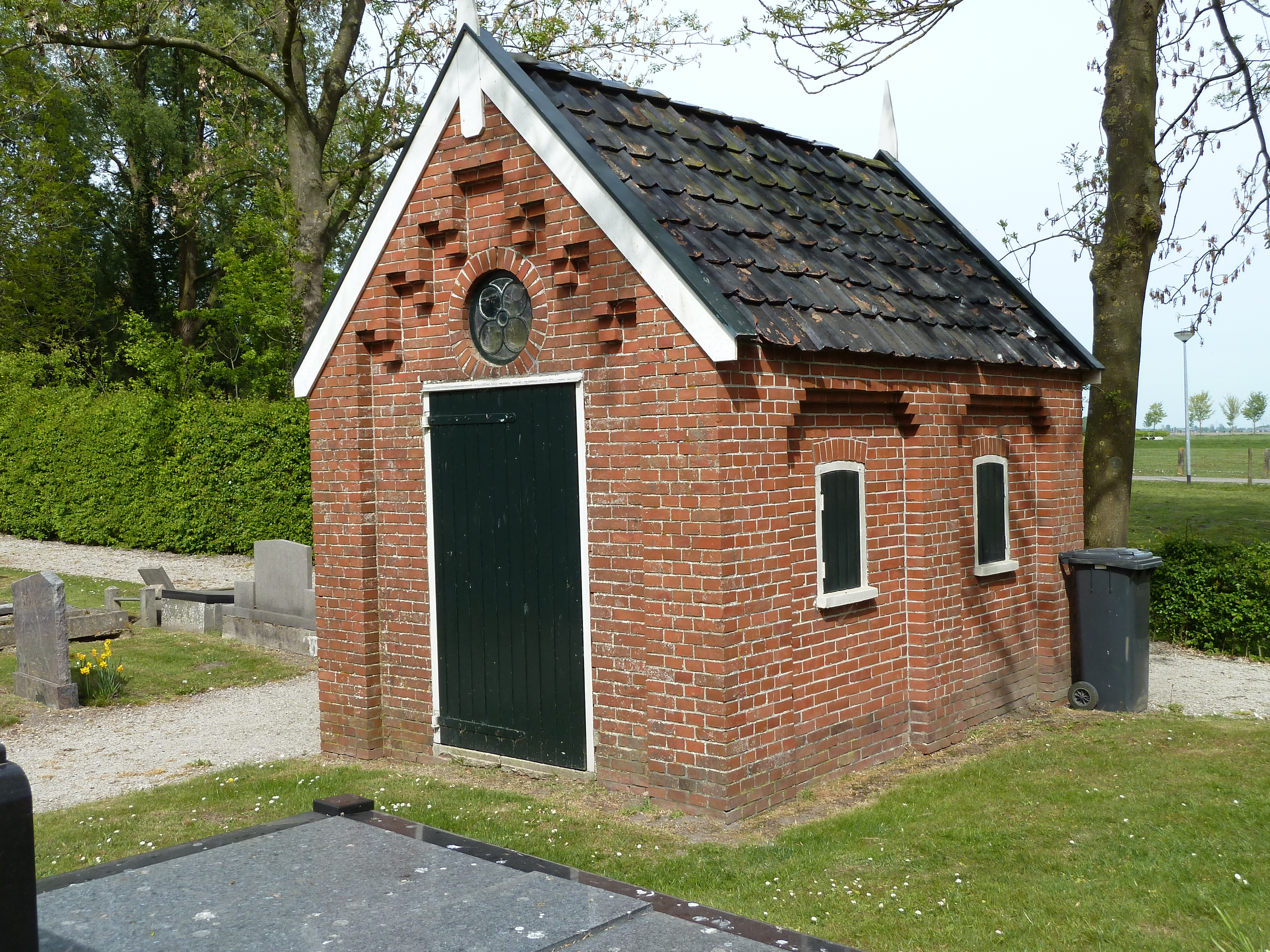
"Baarhuis" on the cemetery of Den Ham

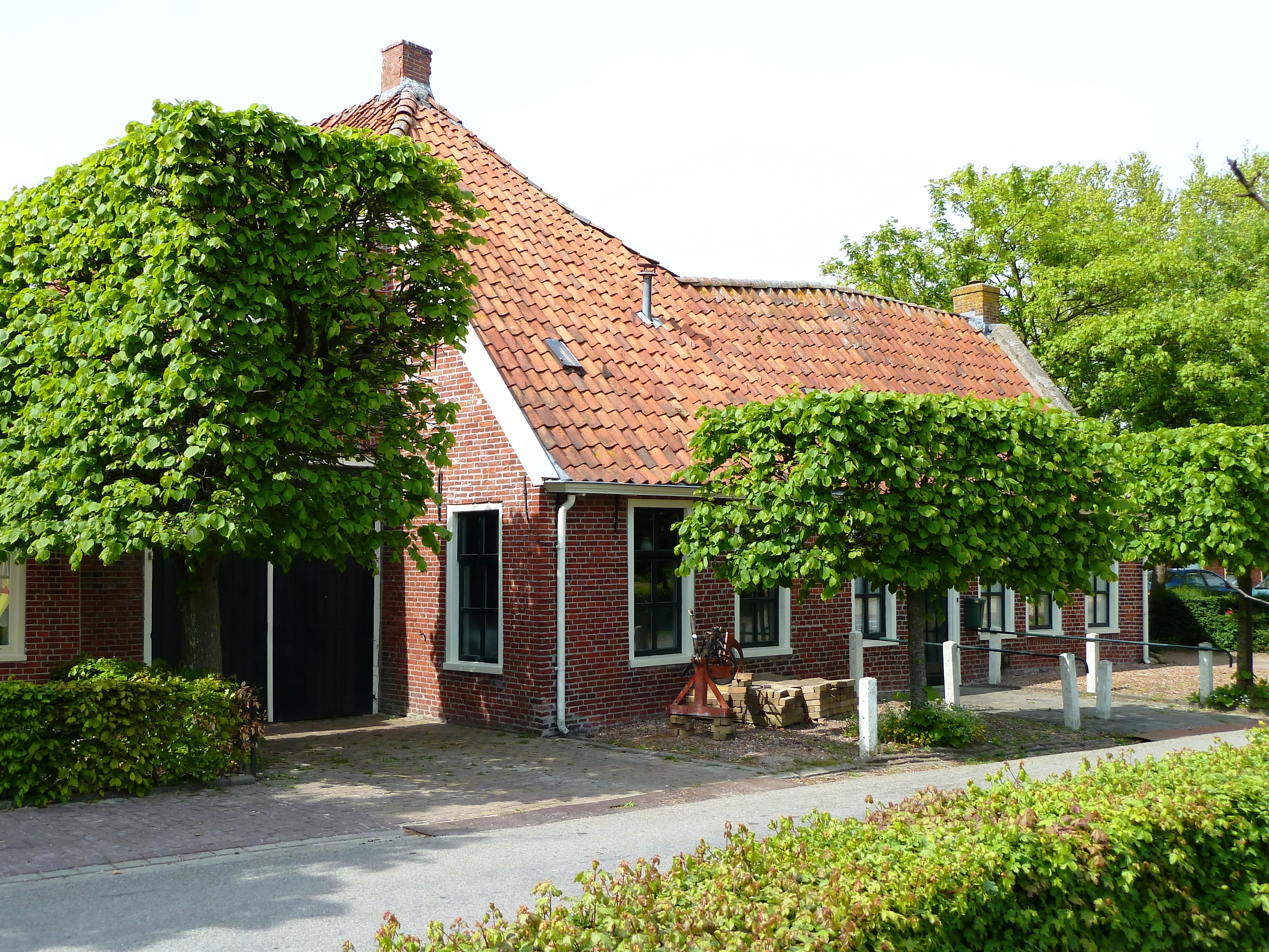
The old bakery-grocery of W.E. Dijk

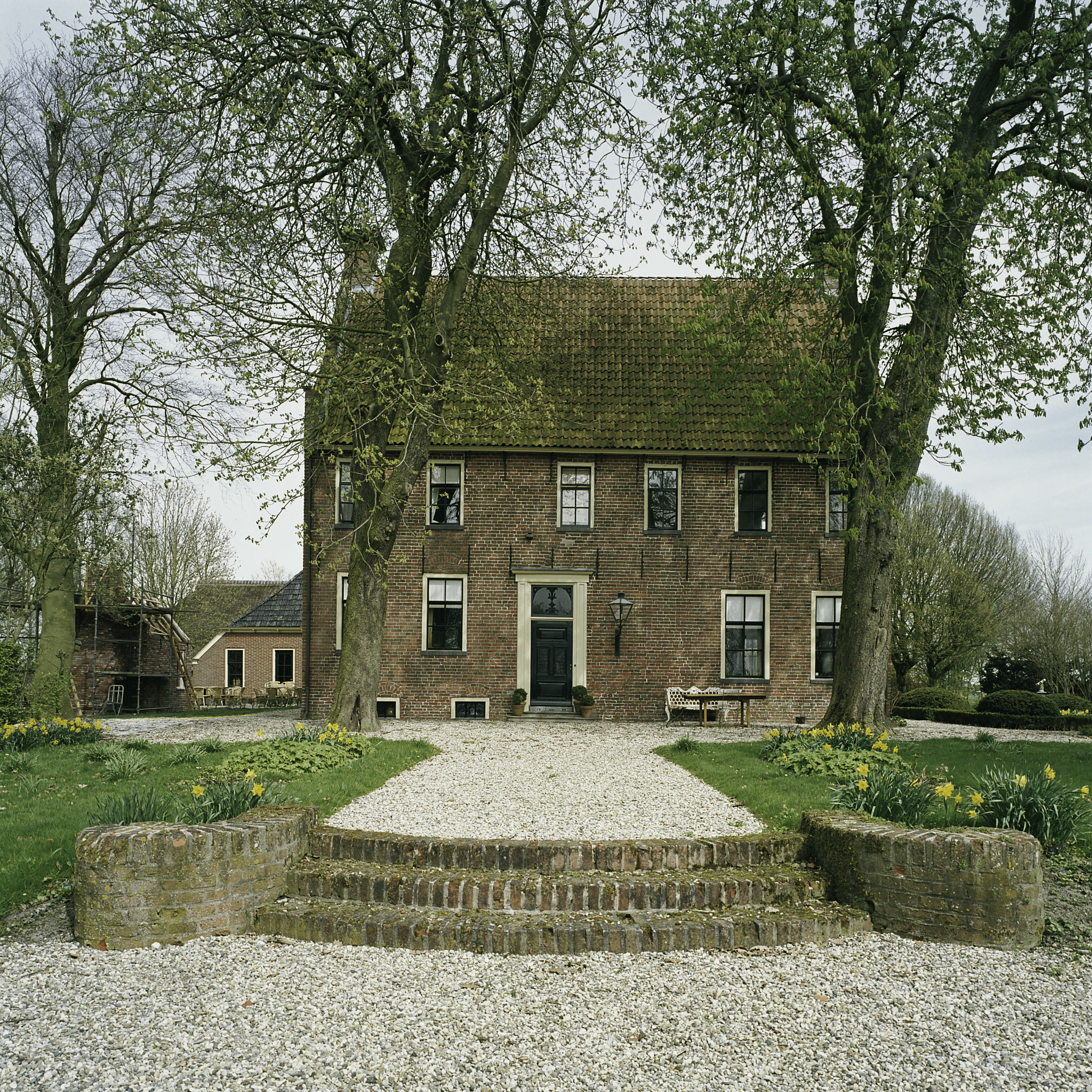
Piloersemaborg
