= Saaksum =

Saaksum Soaksum (Gronings)
- Village
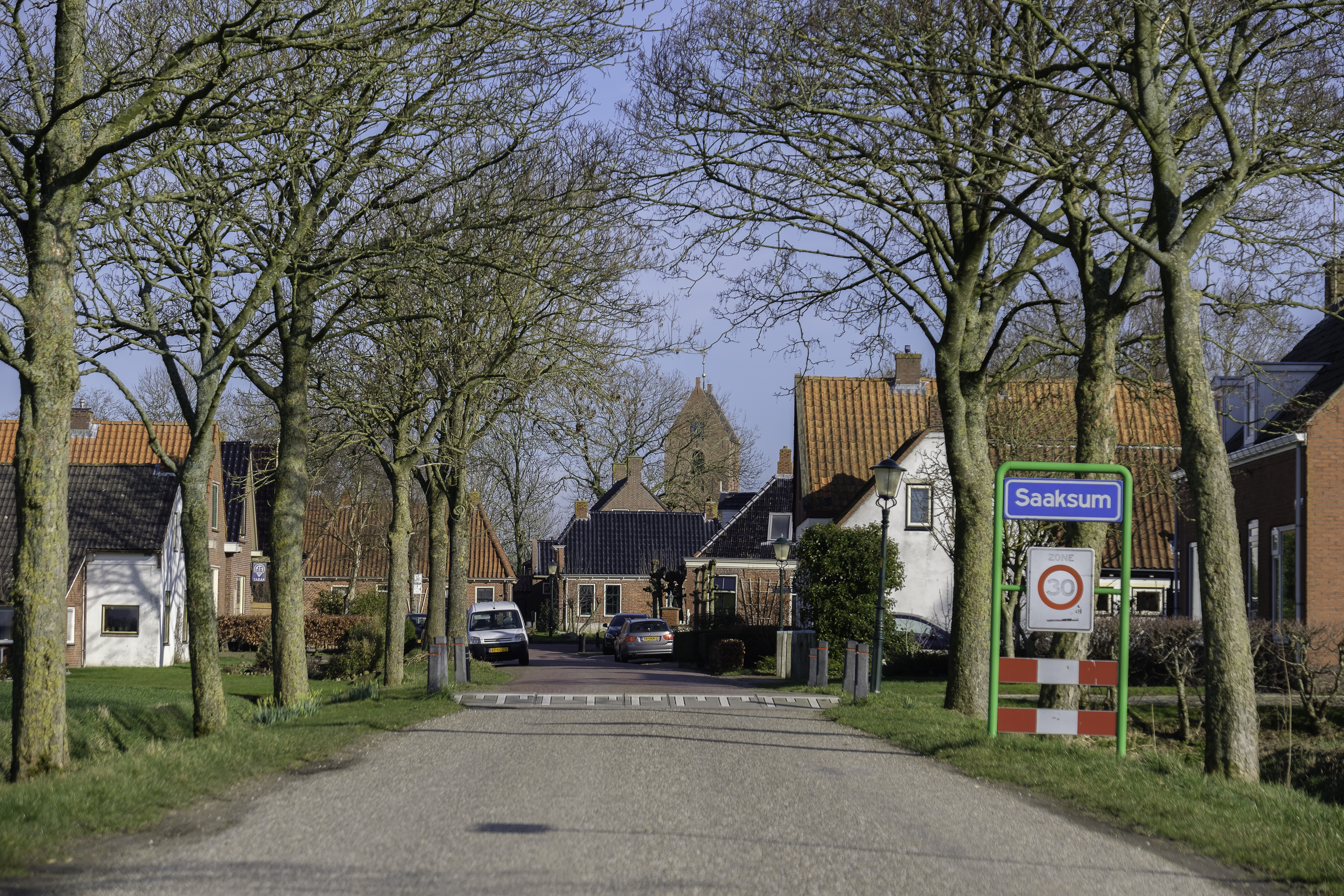
- Entrance to Saaksum

- Location in the province of Groningen in the Netherlands Saaksum (Netherlands)
- Coordinates: 53°19′N 6°25′E
- Country: Netherlands
- Province: Groningen
- Municipality: Westerkwartier
- Elevation: 1.7 m (5.6 ft)

Population (2021)
  - Total: 90
- Time zone: UTC+1 (CET)
  - Summer (DST): UTC+2 (CEST)
- Postcode: 9886
- Area code: 0594

Saaksum (Dutch: [ˈsaːksʏm]; Gronings: Soaksum) is a village in the municipality of Westerkwartier in the province of Groningen in the Netherlands. As of 2021, it had a population of 90. Until the municipal reorganization of 1990, it belonged to the former municipality of Oldehove.

Saaksum is a wierde village in good condition. It is a protected villagescape. The wierde is located on the edge of the village, on the main road from Aduard to Roodehaan.

== Church ==
The Reformed Church, which was rebuilt in 1849, is located on the wierde. Its predecessor was a church dedicated to Saint Catherine of Alexandria according to a document from 1588. A memorial stone at the bottom of the tower reports that it was ghemake ('made') in 1550. The tower was restored in 1709. In 1845 it was decided to build a new church due to its dilapidation, but the tower remained standing. The new church was built in 1849. From the church, a short church path runs to the village, which is located entirely along a circular road.

== Gallery ==
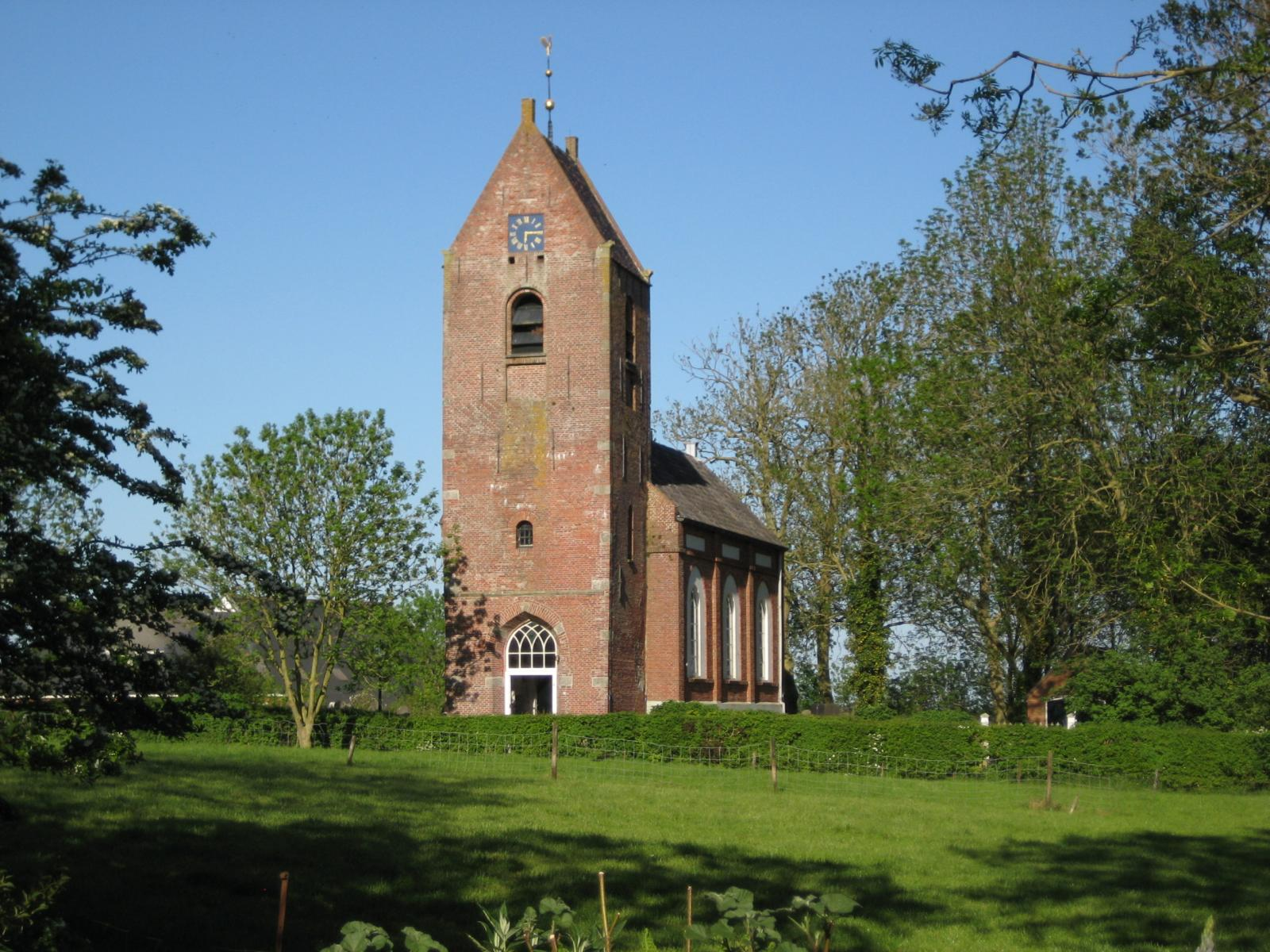
The church of Saaksum

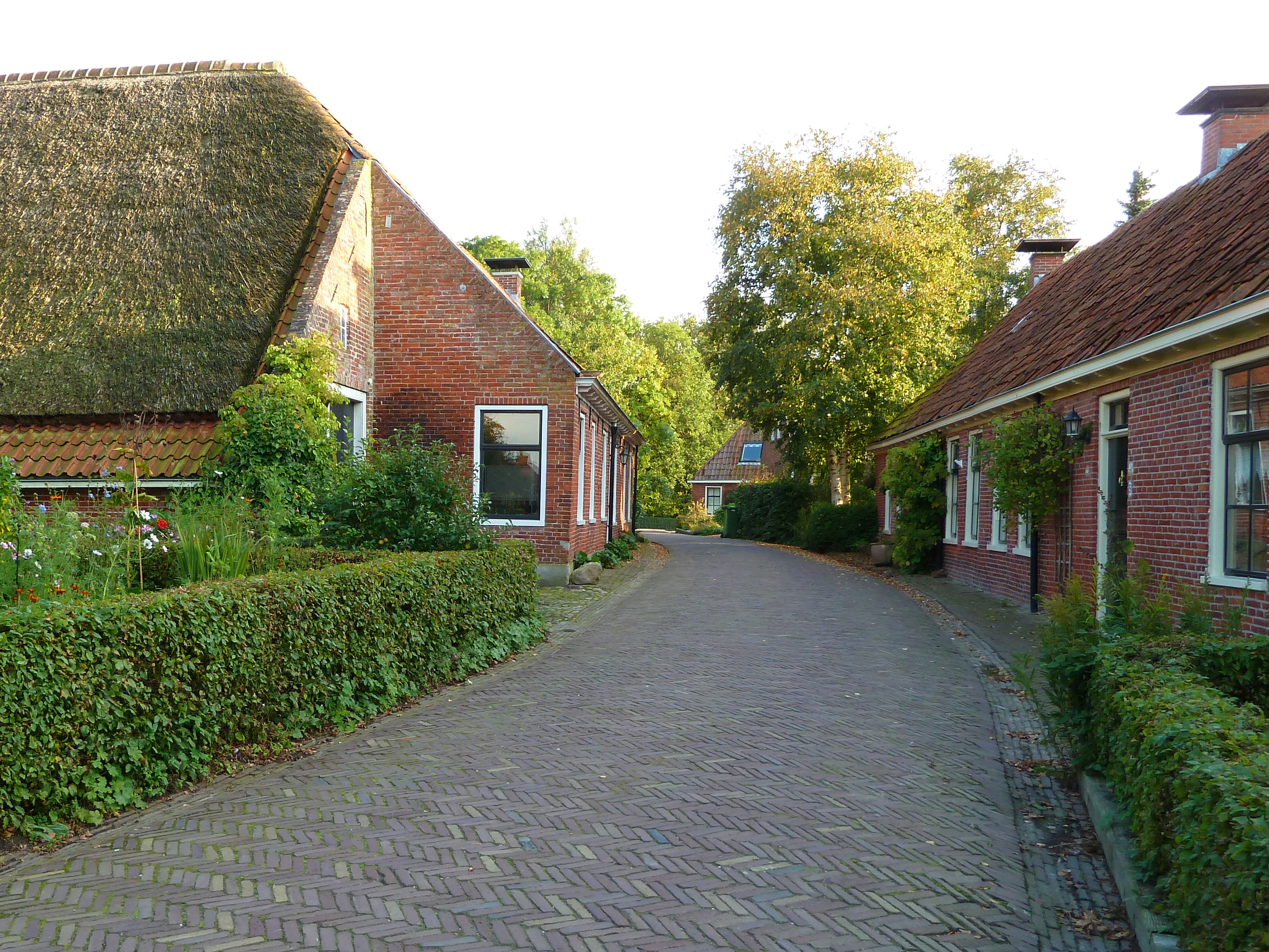
Houses on the Noordstraat

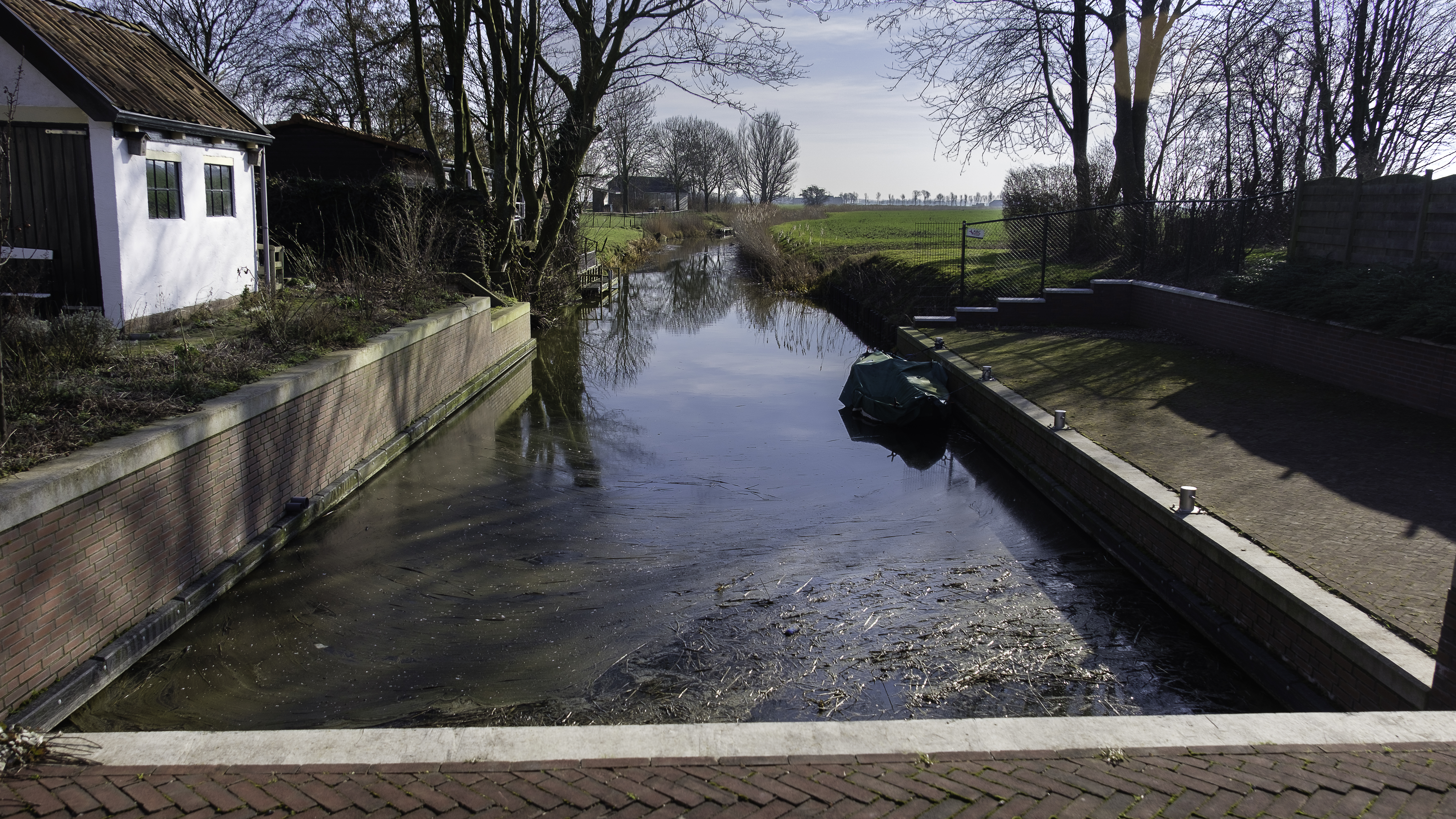
Harbour of Saaksum to the Oldehoofsch canal
