= Dutch Low Saxon =

Group of Low Saxon dialects spoken in the northeastern Netherlands

- Nederlaands Leegsaksies, Nederlaands Nedersaksies
- Native to: Netherlands, Germany
- Native speakers: 2.15 million (2005)
- Language family: Indo-European: Germanic; West Germanic; North Sea Germanic; Low German; Low Saxon; Dutch Low Saxon

Official status
- Recognised minority language in: Netherlands

Language codes
- ISO 639-3: –
- Glottolog: None
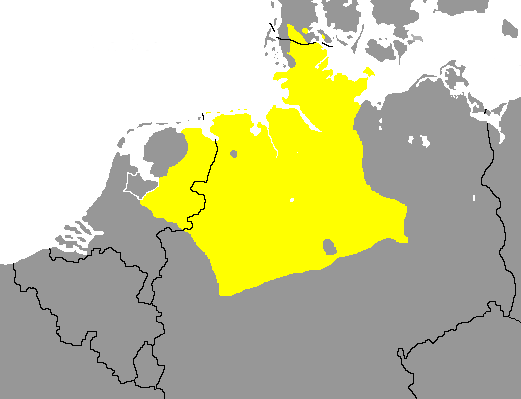
- Low Saxon (including Dutch Low Saxon in the Netherlands) area in yellow.

Dutch Low Saxon (Nederlaands Leegsaksies [ˈneːdərlaːnts ˈleːxsɑksis] or Nederlaands Nedersaksies; Dutch: Nederlands Nedersaksisch) are Low Saxon dialects from the Low German language that are spoken in the northeastern Netherlands and are mostly, but not exclusively, written with local, unstandardised orthographies based on Standard Dutch orthography.

The UNESCO Atlas of endangered languages lists the language as vulnerable. The percentage of speakers among parents dropped from 34% in 1995 to 15% in 2011. The percentage of speakers among their children dropped from 8% to 2% in the same period. According to a 2005 study 53% indicated to speak Low Saxon or Low Saxon and Dutch at home and 71% they could speak Low Saxon in the researched area, accounting for a total of 1.6 million speakers at home and 2.15 million total, ranging from "reasonably" to "very well" in terms of proficiency.

The Netherlands recognizes Dutch Low Saxon as a regional language under the European Charter for Regional or Minority Languages.

== Classification ==
The classification of Dutch Low Saxon is not unanimous. From a diachronic point of view, the Dutch Low Saxon dialects are merely the Low Saxon (Northern Low Saxon and Friso-Saxon in the case of Gronings) dialects native to areas in the Netherlands, as opposed to areas beyond the national border with Germany. Some Dutch Low Saxon dialects like Tweants show features of Westphalian, a West Low German dialect spoken in adjacent Northern Germany.

From a strictly synchronic point of view, however, some linguists classify Dutch Low Saxon as belonging to the Dutch language area. Also, as a practical matter, Dutch Low Saxon, since the 17th century, has been influenced by Standard Dutch, but the Low Saxon dialects in Germany are influenced by Standard German. Recent studies have, however, shown that mutual intelligibility is not necessarily impaired and that the basis remains the same.

== Usage ==
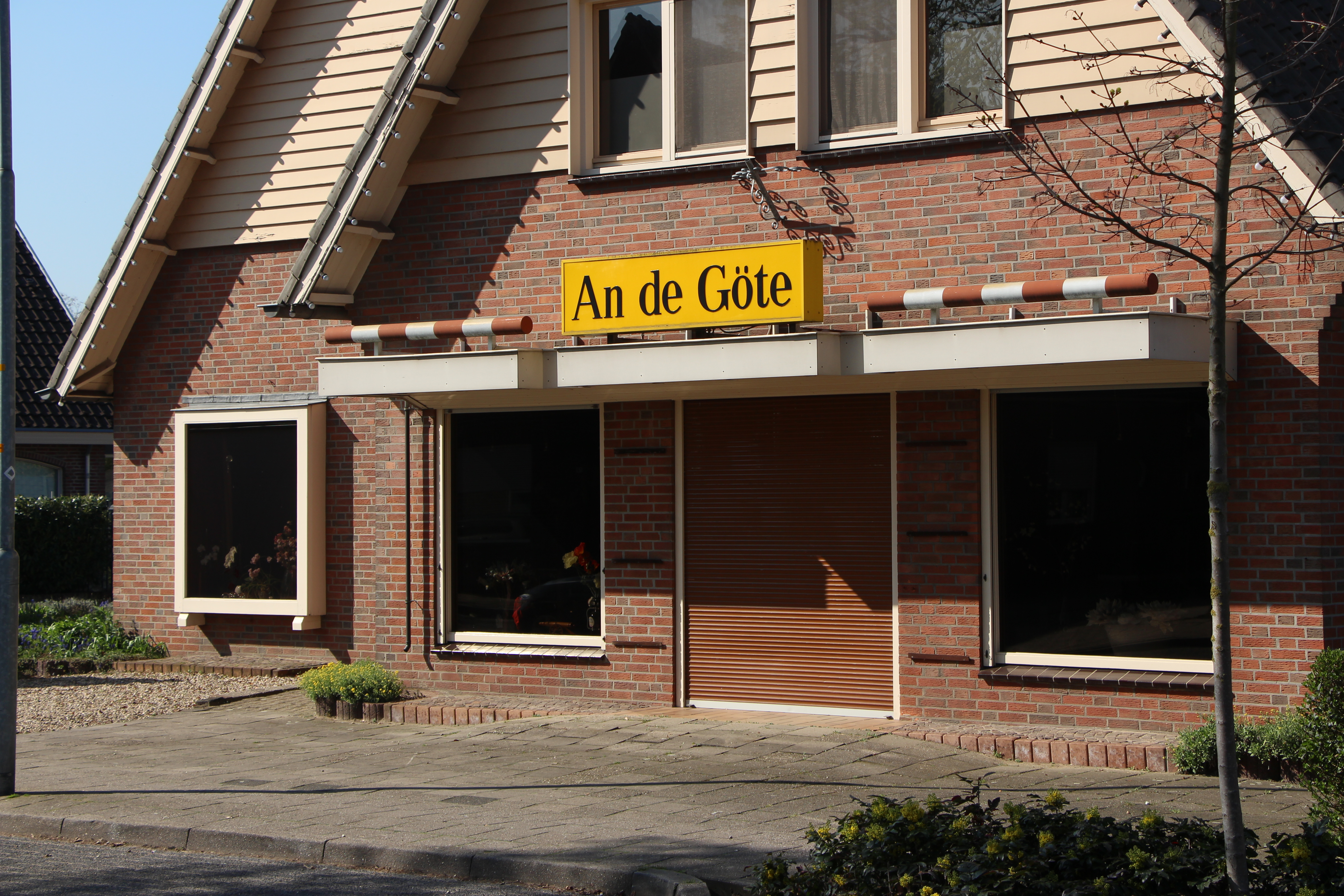
Former shop with Dutch Low Saxon name An de Göte ("At the Gutter") on the Heelweg in Dinxperlo.

Shortly after Second World War, linguists claimed that speaking a dialect other than the standard language would impair children's (language) learning abilities. In combination with a generally condescending attitude by the upper classes of Dutch society and the media towards speakers of Low Saxon varieties (or in fact anything different from Standard Dutch), that goaded many parents to stop passing the language on to their children. It also brought about a general opinion among speakers of Low Saxon that having the slightest accent, in Dutch, would reduce job opportunities and social status.

Throughout the 1960s, the language decline inspired many to form dialect preservation circles and groups, such as the Tweants Kreenk vuur de Twentse Sproake (Circle for the Twents language) or the Drèents Huus van de Taol (House of the Language). Many of them were mainly interested in preserving rather than promoting the language. The prevailing tone was one of melancholy and nostalgia. Their focus was often on preserving cultural traits considered typical to speakers of the language, such as rural life and traditional practices, crafts and costumes. That merely confirmed many of the existing stereotypes about speakers of the language.

Another tone was rather literary in nature. Though well-intended, it caused even more estrangement with younger generations.

At the same time, knowledge of and appreciation for related varieties was poor, which stifled cooperation between most of the dialect preservation groups. Instead of forming an organisation to stand together and help one another to improve the status for all the different varieties, fiery discussions arose about whether the long open or open-mid back rounded vowel (pronounced [ɒː] or [ɔː], depending on the dialect) should be written as either ⟨oa⟩ or ⟨ao⟩. That resulted in little co-operation and no nationwide coordination.

Other attempts to unite the different dialect circles were met with cynicism. The conception prevailed that the dialects were too different to unite.

In 1975, the rock 'n' roll band Normaal boldly shook all perceptions of Low Saxon and its speakers. Until then, Low Saxon was mostly restricted to traditional folklore music. Normaal openly denounced all Dutch disdain, praised farmers and local farm life and boldly used Achterhooks Low Saxon, voicing the opinion and feelings of many Dutchmen of non-Dutch-speaking origin. Their hit song "Oerend Hard", a song about two bikers who died in an accident, took the charts by storm, and it is now regarded a true evergreen of Dutch music. It quickly garnered them a large fan base, even in non-Low Saxon areas, such as Friesland and Limburg. They inspired many other young rock 'n' roll artists to sing in Low Saxon, who now form a subgenre of their own in the Dutch music industry, which is gradually becoming aware of the genre's commercial potential.

In 1996, Dutch Low Saxon was added to the European Charter for Regional or Minority Languages. Dutch provinces now receive minor funds for preserving and promoting the use of Low Saxon. A general rise in regional pride and appreciation for the Low Saxon identity made the earlier openly disdainful attitude towards Low Saxon seem to have subsided somewhat. Low Saxon is increasingly being used in popular culture, marketing, and local politics.

The Tweants municipality of Rijssen-Holten, for example, has officially adopted a bilingual status for their town hall desks, and customers may opt for Dutch or Low Saxon help.

In 2012, a radio presenter for national broadcasting station 3FM, Michiel Veenstra from Almelo, promised to present in Tweants for an hour if a Tweants song received more than €10,000 in the annual fundraising campaign Het Glazen Huis (The Glass House). As the song received more than €17,000, Veenstra kept his promise.

An increasing number of local political parties have used Low Saxon in their 2014 electoral campaigns. In 2014, a Facebook page called "Tukkers be like" gained more than 18,000 followers within a week. The page uses Twents cultural concepts and expressions in Twents. The idea of the page was based on the Internet meme "Bitches be like", which gained enormous popularity in 2013, and inspired many to create their own versions. The meme presents an image of a certain situation, to which a certain group would respond in a typical way.

== Education ==
Dutch Low Saxon has long been stigmatised and kept out of schools. People of older generations may relate numerous accounts of their childhood in which contemporaries were afraid to go to school for fear of being reprimanded, or purposely ignored, for not speaking Dutch.

The similarities between the languages made Low Saxon be regarded a dialect of Dutch, and shifting from Low Saxon to Dutch would be relatively easy. Instead of adapting the school curriculum and guiding the children into learning Dutch as a second language and embracing the potential of the Low Saxon language, non-Dutch speaking parents were advised to speak Dutch with their children instead to increase their chances of success on the job market. The result was a string of Dutch dialects with Low Saxon features, which were also looked down upon.

As of 2014, Low Saxon is still not a part of the Dutch school curriculum. It is neither a subject nor a mode of communication. This causes a general lack of knowledge about, and appreciation for the language. Its possible role as a language of trade between the Netherlands and Germany is often dismissed, but a 2012 study indicates it may be a useful addition in international trade communications.

As of 2015, language enthusiasts attempt to start up courses for the language and culture, especially in the Twente region. They are mostly studies aimed at the elderly but still prove to be very popular. There still is no professional attempt to promote the language into the school curriculum.

Probably the largest single body of work ever produced in Dutch Low Saxon is the Dutch Low Saxon Wikipedia, begun in 2006 as a separate project from the German Low Saxon Wikipedia, which preceded it by three years.

== Dutch influence ==
A lot of the dialects have been affected by the Hollandic expansion of the 17th century. All of them are lexically dependent on Dutch rather than German for neologisms. When written down, they use a Dutch-based orthography.

Several long vowel shifts happened in Veluws, Urkers, Sallaans, Stellingwarfs, Drèents and in some variants of Gronings; the change occurred as the Hollandic dialect rose in prestige during the 17th century. For example, the oe [uː] changed into uu [yː]. Tweants, Eastern Achterhooks and some variants of Gronings and Drents, by contrast, retained their old vowels. Compare the Tweants and Sallaans equivalents: hoes : huus ("house"). In many dialects, the oe sound was preserved in some words but changed to uu in others. As a result, in Sallaans house is huus, but mouse is moes (as in Tweants).

Dutch has lost the word doe "thou" and replaced it with jij, equivalent to English "ye", originally the second person plural. In many Low Saxon dialects in the Netherlands, the same happened. The doe : ie/ieje/ij isogloss runs close to the Dutch border, except in Groningen, where it enters the Dutch territory. In Twente, it is present in the easternmost villages of Denekamp and Oldenzaal, but its disappearance from the rest of the region is only a relatively recent development. In the Achterhoek (Gelderland), dou can be found in Winterswijk and Groenlo.
