= Dutch Wikipedia =

Dutch-language edition of Wikipedia

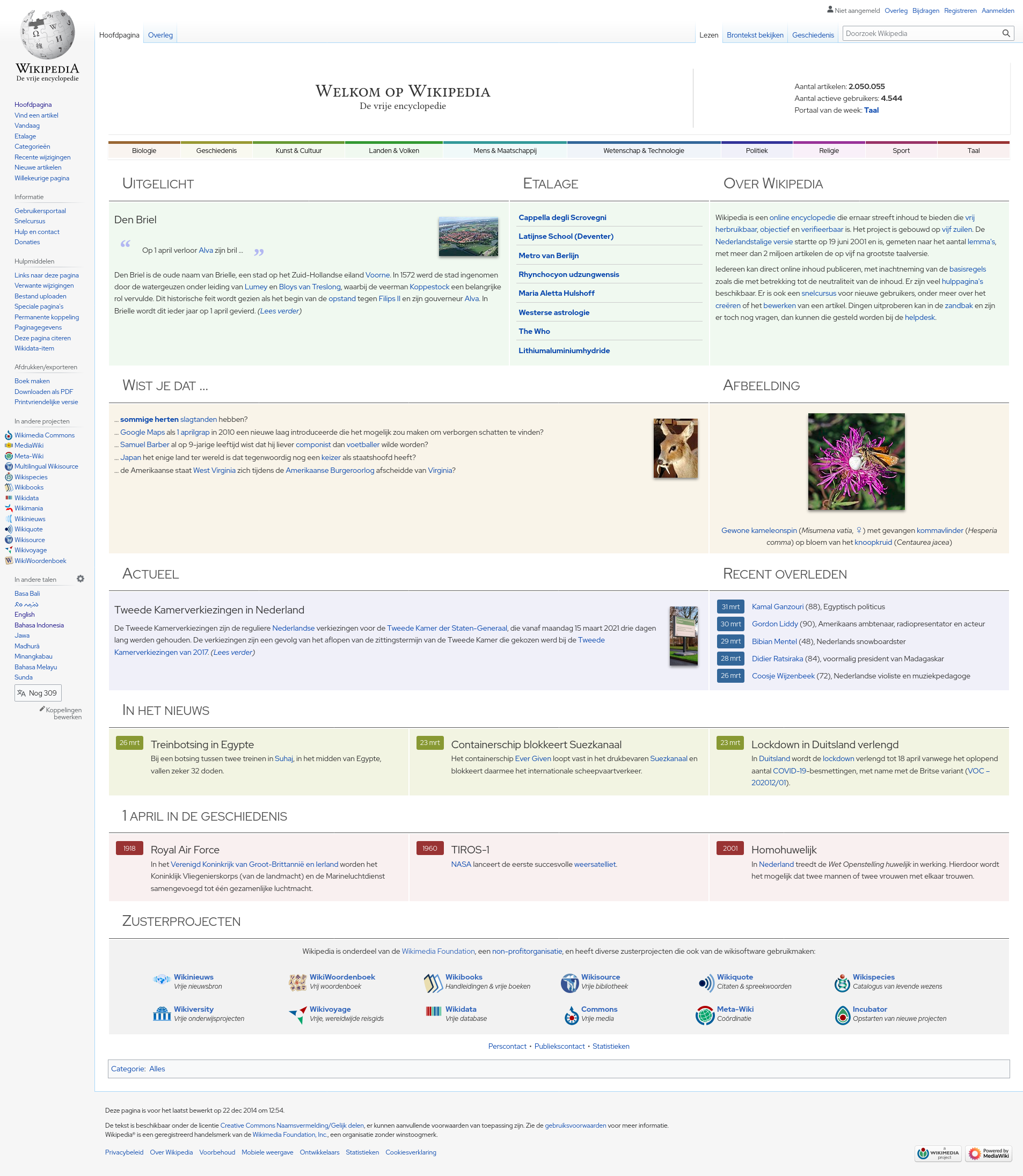
- Screenshot Main page of the Dutch Wikipedia in April 2021
- Website type: Online encyclopedia
- Available in: Dutch
- Headquarters: Miami, Florida
- Owner: Wikimedia Foundation
- Creator: Dutch Wikipedia community
- Website: nl.wikipedia.org
- Commercial: No
- Registration: Optional
- Users: 1.62 million (as of 27 September 2026)
- Launched: 19 June 2001; 25 years ago
- Content license: Creative Commons Attribution/ Share-Alike 4.0 (most text also dual-licensed under GFDL); Media licensing varies

The Dutch Wikipedia (Dutch: Nederlandstalige Wikipedia) is the Dutch-language edition of the free online encyclopedia, Wikipedia. It was founded on 19 June 2001.

As of September 2026, the Dutch Wikipedia is the sixth-largest Wikipedia edition, with 2,227,829 articles. It was the fourth Wikipedia edition to exceed one million articles, after the English, German, and French editions. Many articles, however, have been created by bots and are only a few lines long. In April 2016, 1154 active editors made at least five edits in that month.

English is the most popular Wikipedia in the Netherlands, followed by Dutch. In Belgium, Dutch is the third most popular Wikipedia, after English and French, though the numbers of page views in all three languages are similar. In Suriname, the only Dutch-speaking country outside Europe, Dutch Wikipedia is second after English.

It has a presence in Curaçao and Aruba, as well in the Caribbean Netherlands, but has fewer pageviews than English.

== History ==
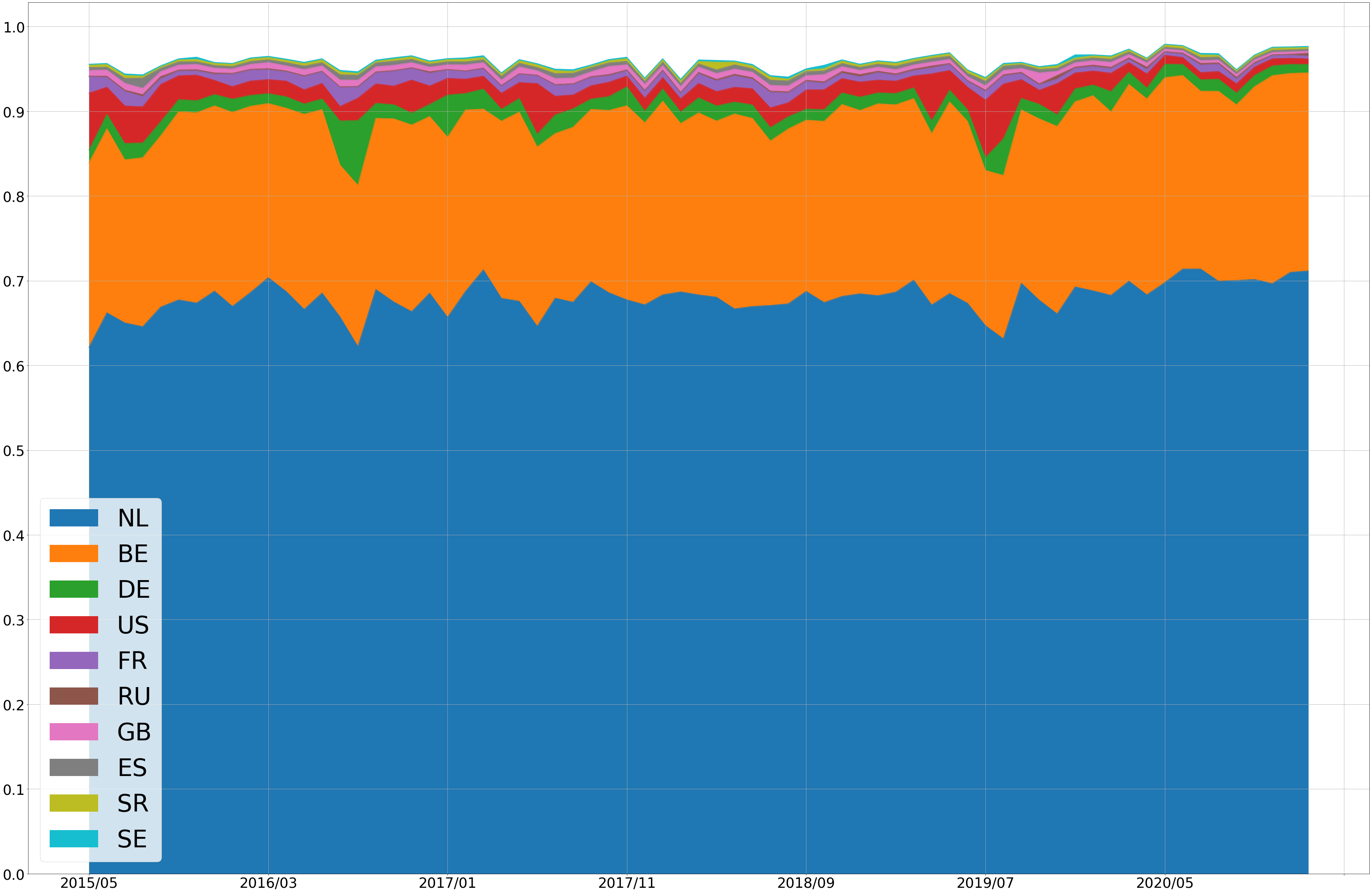
Evolution of the origin of viewers on the Dutch Wikipedia

The Dutch Wikipedia was started on 19 June 2001, and reached 100,000 articles on 14 October 2005. It briefly surpassed the Polish Wikipedia as the sixth-largest edition of Wikipedia, but then fell back to the eighth position. On 1 March 2006, it overtook the Swedish and Italian editions in one day to rise back to the sixth position. The edition's 500,000th article was created on 30 November 2008. In a 2006 Multiscope research study, the Dutch Wikipedia was rated the third-best Dutch-language website, after Google and Gmail, with a score of 8.1.

The Dutch language Wikipedia has the largest ratio of Wikipedia pages per native speaker of all of the top 10 largest Wikipedia editions. Its rate of daily article creations spiked in March 2006, rapidly growing to an average of 1,000 a day in early May 2006. After this number was reached, growth dropped to an average of only about 250 a day, comparable to the averages around December 2005. Since then, there have been more article-creation surges, one of the largest peaking at 2,000 new articles per day in September 2007, but the growth rate has always returned to the lowest average of around 250.

In 2008, Dutch businessman Bob Sijthoff attempted to sue "the Vereniging Wikimedia Nederland" and "the Stichting Wikimedia Nederland" to force the removal of his Dutch Wikipedia article, which he stated contained "false and abusive" information. On 10 December 2008, the court rejected his request. The judge ruled that he had sued the wrong entity and that legal responsibility for the content of the articles would not lie in the Netherlands, but with the American Wikimedia Foundation.

=== Internet bots ===
The majority of articles in Dutch Wikipedia (59%) were created by internet bots. In October 2011, several bots created 80,000 articles (then equivalent to 10% of the entire edition's article count) in only 11 days.

The Dutch Wikipedia's one-millionth article was created in December 2011, after another surge of bot activity saw 100,000 added articles in only 10 days. In late March 2013, the Dutch Wikipedia surpassed the French Wikipedia to become the third-largest edition of Wikipedia. In June 2013, it overtook the German Wikipedia to become the second-largest Wikipedia edition.

== Quality ==
In 2014, the Dutch National Institute for Public Health and the Environment (RIVM) compared ten articles on infectious diseases from the Dutch Wikipedia with the ten corresponding National Coordination Centre for Infectious Disease Control (LCI) guidelines. The researchers concluded that the information on Wikipedia contained no major errors and was largely consistent with the information on their own information pages. However, there were minor inaccuracies, and references were frequently missing.

=== Depth ===
The depth or editing depth of Wikipedia is a rough indicator of the encyclopedia's collaborative quality, showing how frequently its articles are updated. The depth is measured by taking the average number of edits per article multiplied by the extent in which articles are supported by discussion (among other things, talk pages). Among the nine language editions with one million articles, the Dutch, Swedish, and Polish Wikipedias in that order have depth parameters much lower than the other six. As of March 2012, for the English version the article depth is 666, for the German 88, for the French 153, for the Spanish 160, for the Dutch only 18.

=== Bytes per article ===
Compared to most other Wikipedia editions with a similar number of articles, articles on the Dutch Wikipedia have less content with an average of 1,598 bytes per article (as of February 2014). This is roughly 40% of that of the French, German, Italian, Russian, and Spanish editions (3,986–4,277 bytes/article as of February 2014).

== Culture ==
Dutch Wikipedians responding to a Wikimedia survey described the atmosphere of the Dutch Wikipedia as quarrelsome and distrustful, with ego and stubbornness named as the premier causes of conflict. There is a small group of users in effective control. In some instances new users were discouraged by moderators from joining discussions in the Dutch equivalent of the "village pump".

== Article growth ==
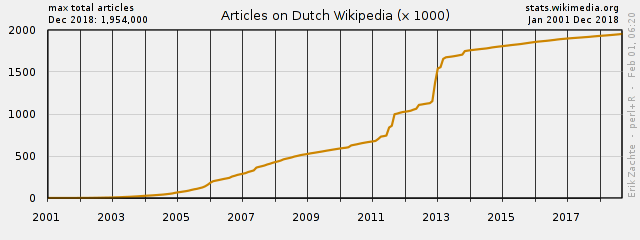
Graph showing article growth of the Dutch Wikipedia between June 2001 and December 2018

Date	Number of articles	New articles per day (avg.)
19 June 2001	1	1
5 August 2003	10,000	13
8 February 2004	20,000	53
28 June 2004	30,000	71
7 November 2004	40,000	76
29 January 2005	50,000	120
24 March 2005	60,000	185
20 May 2005	70,000	175
22 July 2005	80,000	159
11 September 2005	90,000	196
16 October 2005	100,000	63
2 June 2006	200,000	437
11 June 2007	300,000	267
1 February 2008	400,000	426
30 December 2008	500,000	300
14 July 2010	600,000	178
25 June 2011	700,000	289
22 October 2011	800,000	840
9 December 2011	900,000	2,083
12 January 2012	1,000,000	2,941
24 September 2012	1,100,000	391
9 March 2013	1,200,000	602
26 March 2013	1,300,000	5,882
5 April 2013	1,400,000	10,000
13 April 2013	1,500,000	12,500
17 June 2013	1,600,000	1,538
3 January 2014	1,700,000	500
6 March 2015	1,800,000	233
27 May 2017	1,900,000	123
8 March 2020	2,000,000	254
2 September 2022	2,100,000	110
21 October 2025	2,200,000	87

== See also ==
- Dutch Low Saxon Wikipedia
