= Piloersemaborg =

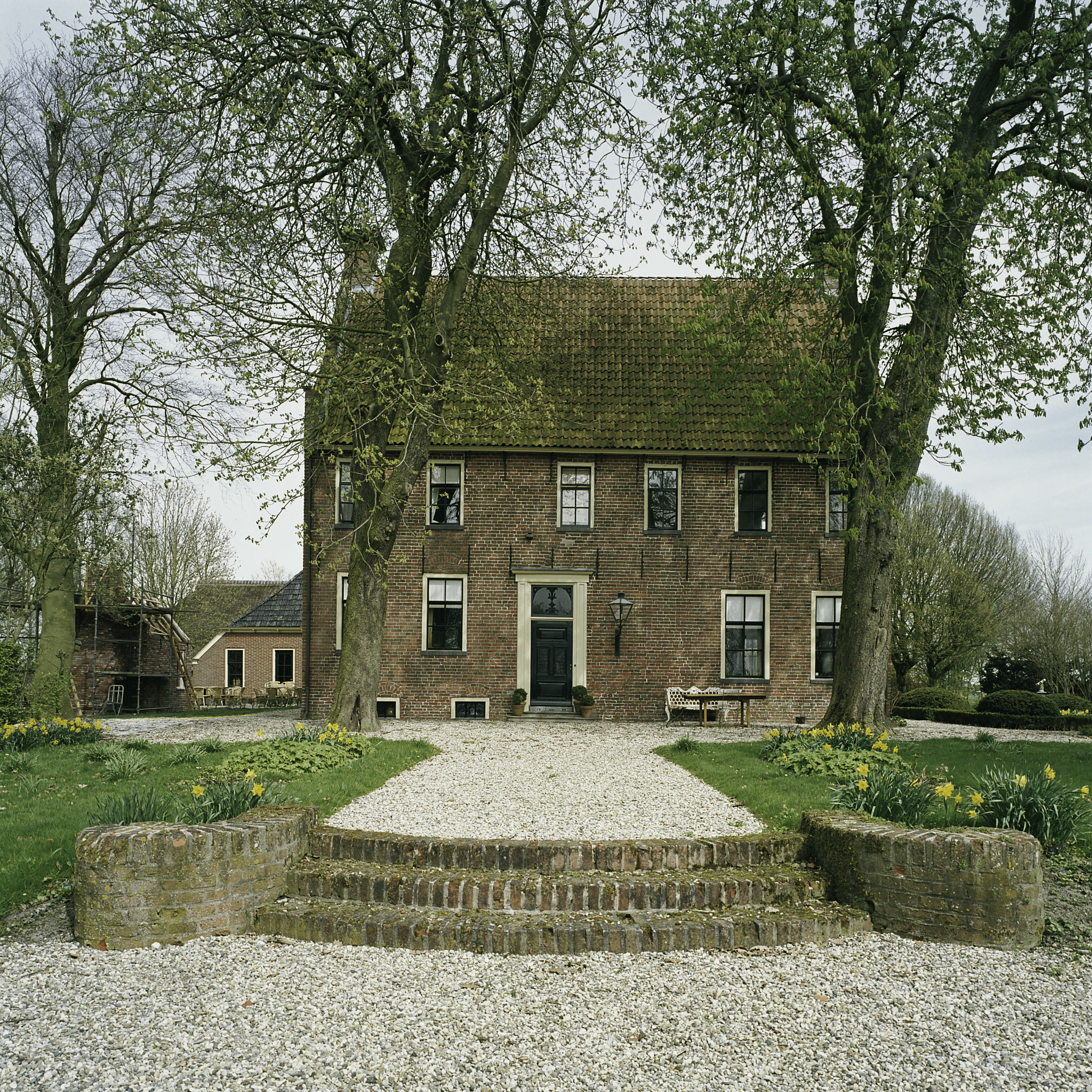
- Entrance of the borg in 2006

- Location within Groningen (province)
- Alternative names: Hamsterborg

General information
- Location: Sietse Veldstraweg 25; Den Ham, Netherlands
- Coordinates: 53°16′34.04″N 6°25′3.27″E
- Current tenants: Dick Soek
- Completed: 1633
- Owner: Stichting Wierenga van Hamsterborg

The Piloersemaborg (Dutch pronunciation: [piˈluːrsəmaːˌbɔr(ə)x]; Borg of Piloersema) is a 17th-century borg (castle) in the village of Den Ham in Groningen in the Netherlands. It currently houses a restaurant.

== History ==
The Piloersemaborg was built in 1633 for Johan de Mepsche. After the De Mepsche family left the borg, the building was used for farming. Peter Jacobs Bos bought the "borg farm" from the Mepsche family together with his wife Wiske Jacobs Scholten in 1699. The building, the interior, and the estate of the borg are currently owned by the foundation Wierenga van Hamsterborg. Since 2005, the building houses a restaurant of Dick Soek.

== Restaurant ==
Head chef of the restaurant Piloersemaborg is Dick Soek. He runs the restaurant in the Piloersemaborg since 2005. At the time, he was also running the Michelin starred restaurant Schathoes Verhildersum in Leens. In 2012, for practical and economical reasons he moved the restaurant and all staff from Leens to Den Ham, continuing his enterprise on one location. Soek lost the Michelin star in the process.

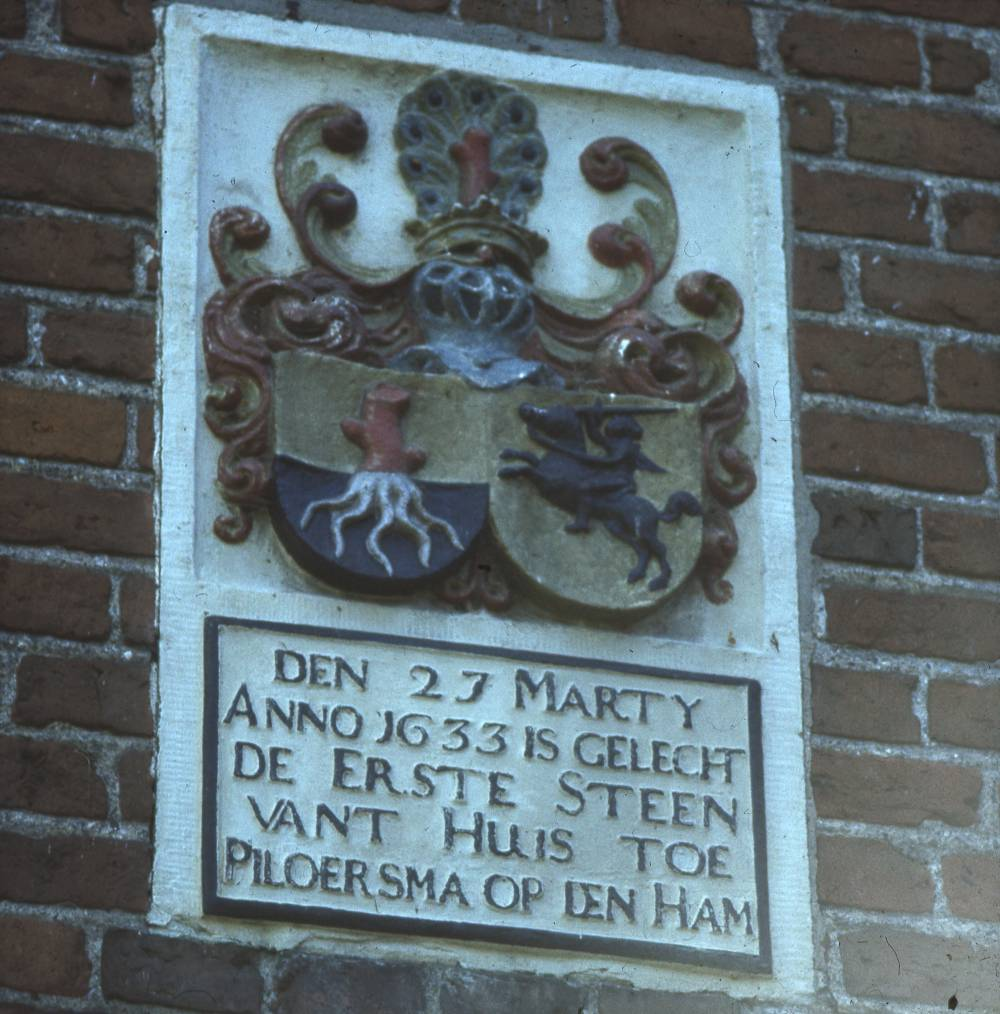
First stone
