= Dutch Low Saxon Wikipedia =

Dutch Low Saxon edition of Wikipedia

- Website type: Internet encyclopedia project
- Available in: Dutch Low Saxon
- Headquarters: Miami, Florida
- Owner: Wikimedia Foundation
- Creator: Dutch Low Saxon wiki community
- Website: nds-nl.wikipedia.org
- Commercial: No
- Registration: Optional
- Content license: Creative Commons Attribution/ Share-Alike 4.0 (most text also dual-licensed under GFDL); Media licensing varies

Dutch Low Saxon Wikipedia is the Dutch Low Saxon edition of Wikipedia, started on 24 March 2006. It collects articles written in any Low German dialect indigenous to the Netherlands, as well as a small number of articles in varieties of Low German from Germany. As of 27 September 2026, it has 8,108 articles. Among other features, there are spoken articles, "showcased" articles, and provincial portals.

The Dutch Low Saxon Wikipedia has been cited in the Dutch press, and Low Saxon institutes in the Netherlands have noted it and contributed to it.

== Characteristics ==
Dutch Low Saxon has traditionally been an oral set of dialects exclusively, with a modest literary tradition existing since the 19th century. Given that the vast majority of speakers never write in the language, the fairly sizeable number of speakers is not a good indicator of the potential for attracting contributors to the Dutch Low Saxon Wikipedia. A handful of contributors, with little variation over the years, have sustained this edition of Wikipedia since its inception, also staying on top of the vandalism which, although low-key, occurs with some regularity.

As a snapshot indicator, of the thirty-one active users listed for the Dutch Low Saxon Wikipedia as per 11 November 2021, twenty-one users made up to two edits in the preceding thirty days. Only three editors wrote any Low Saxon content, the other users being human editors or bots whose contributions were maintenance-oriented, such as fixing or updating links. The scarcity of committed writers has remained characteristic in spite of several attempts to boost their number, for instance through appeals on radio shows to which individual contributors have been invited, or appeals on the Dutch Wikipedia.

Many of the articles, for instance on Dutch Low Saxon writers and on features of Low Saxon language and culture, do not exist in any other edition of Wikipedia. Existing illustrations on Wikimedia Commons are usually linked to illustrate articles. According to the list of Wikipedias, the Dutch Low Saxon Wikipedia has a relatively large number of edits and images and above-average article depth for Wikipedias that have between 1,000 and 9,999 articles (depth of 23 compared to a mode of 8, a median of 11 and a mean of 18). Almost all substantive contributors to the Dutch Low Saxon Wikipedia have been male, which seems to reflect a known trend on the larger Wikipedias.

== History ==
The Dutch Low Saxon Wikipedia was preceded by three years by a Low German Wikipedia (the Plattdüütsch Wikipedia), which was set up in April 2003. The Low German dialects, which are not standardised, stretch from all of Northern Germany to the Northeast Netherlands. In practice, however, the Plattdüütsch Wikipedia was a German undertaking, following German-based spelling conventions. This spelling, combined with the growing divide since modern times between Dutch and German plat(t), due to the influence of the Dutch and German standard languages respectively, left a gap to be filled.

The eventual creation of a Dutch Low Saxon Wikipedia was delayed for months due to a debate on whether this collection of dialects – recognised and protected by the Dutch government in the framework of the European Charter for Regional or Minority Languages – merited their own Wikipedia. Proponents made the case that the Dutch varieties are too different from the German ones, at least in writing, to be gathered under the same roof. Some vocal opposition centred on the question of whether the often rather regionally distinct Low Saxon dialects spoken in the Netherlands could be taken as a whole and accommodated within one Wikipedia. The same countrywide grouping, however, had been opted for in the case of the Plattdüütsch Wikipedia (see Meta-Wiki).

Throughout its existence, the number of structural contributors to the Dutch Low Saxon Wikipedia has remained low, with active and virtually fallow periods alternating. Most of the structural contributors have administrator rights. The frequency of vandalism – creation of nonsense articles, removal of content, disparaging remarks, 'correction' of Saxon to Dutch – has varied, with it sometimes being a daily occurrence, and at other times occurring rarely. Vandalism is normally remedied within the day, often within hours or minutes. A particular feature of vandalism on this Wikipedia edition in a low-prestige language that, by and large, is no longer spoken by young people, is that it often pokes fun at the language itself.

== Accommodation of the various dialects ==
Once created, the Dutch Low Saxon Wikipedia took off well, with arrangements being made to accommodate the dialect subgroups and their different spelling conventions (there are several established spelling systems). Each contributor can write in their own dialect, categorizing an article in accordance with the dialect used. If the article is a stub, another contributor can expand it and adapt it to their own dialect. If the article is longer, a further contributor using a different dialect will ask for their alterations to be rendered into the original dialect.

Another feature is that many articles on animals, plants, objects, and activities include an overview of what is often a plethora of local names, differing per region and even per town.

== See also ==
- Dutch Wikipedia
