= Northern Low Saxon =

West Low German dialect

- North Low Saxon, North Saxon
- Native to: Germany, Northeastern Netherlands, southern Denmark
- Region: Lower Saxony, Bremen, Schleswig-Holstein, Hamburg, Groningen, Drenthe
- Language family: Indo-European: Germanic; West Germanic; North Sea Germanic; Low German; Low Saxon; Northern Low Saxon
- Dialects: Schleswigsch; Holsteinisch; Oldenburgisch; East Frisian Low Saxon; North Hanoverian; Dithmarsisch; Emsländisch; Gronings

Language codes
- ISO 639-2: nds
- ISO 639-3: nds (partial)
- Glottolog: ostf1234 North Low Saxon nort2628 German Northern Low Saxon

Northern Low Saxon (in Standard High German: Nordniedersächsisch, also Nordniederdeutsch, lit. North(ern) Low Saxon/German; in Standard Dutch: Noord-Nedersaksisch) is a subgroup of Low Saxon dialects of Low German. As such, it covers a great part of the West Low German-speaking areas of northern Germany, with the exception of the border regions where South Low Saxon (Eastphalian and Westphalian) is spoken, and Gronings dialect in the Netherlands.

== Dialects ==
Northern Low Saxon can be divided into Holsteinian (Holsteinisch), Schleswigian (Schleswigsch), East Frisian Low Saxon, Dithmarsch (Dithmarsisch), North Hanoveranian (Nordhannoversch), Emslandish (Emsländisch), and Oldenburgish (Oldenburgisch) in Germany, with additional dialects in the Netherlands, such as Gronings.

Holsteinisch is spoken in Holstein, the southern part of Schleswig-Holstein in Germany, in Dithmarschen, around Neumünster, Rendsburg, Kiel and Lübeck.

Schleswigsch (German pronunciation: [ˈʃleːsvɪçʃ]) is spoken in Schleswig, which is divided between Germany and Denmark. It is mainly based on a South Jutlandic substrate. Therefore, it has some notable differences in pronunciation and grammar with its southern neighbour dialects. The dialects on the west coast of Schleswig (Nordfriesland district) and some islands show some North Frisian influences.

Oldenburgisch is spoken around the city of Oldenburg. It is limited to Germany. The main difference between it and East Frisian Low Saxon, which is spoken in the Frisian parts of Lower Saxony, is the lack of an East Frisian substrate. Oldenburgisch is spoken in the city of Bremen as "Bremian", which is the only capital where Oldenburgisch is spoken.

=== Overviews ===
a)

- Schleswigsch
- Holsteinisch
- Hamburgisch
- Bremisch-Oldenburgisch
- Ostfriesisch (East Frisian)
- Emsländisch

b)

- Ostfriesisch (East Frisian)
- Emsländisch
- Bremisch-Oldenburgisch
- Nordhannoversch
- Niederelbisch (Hamburg, Elbmarschen)
- Holsteinisch
- Schleswigsch

c)

- Dithmarsch
- Schleswigsch / Schleswigian
- Holsteinisch / Holsteinian
- Oldenburgisch
- Emsländisch
- Nordhannoversch

Emsländisch and Oldenburgisch are also grouped together as Emsländisch-Oldenburgisch, while Bremen and Hamburg lie in the area of Nordhannoversch (in a broader sense).

== Characteristics ==
The most obvious common character in grammar is the forming of the perfect participle. It is formed without a prefix, as in all North Germanic languages, as well as English and Frisian, but unlike standard German, Dutch and some dialects of Westphalian and Eastphalian Low Saxon:

- gahn [ɡɒːn] (to go): Ik bün gahn [ɪkbʏŋˈɡɒːn] (I have gone/I went), Standard German: gehen; ich bin gegangen/ich ging
- seilen [zaˑɪln] (to sail): He hett seilt [hɛɪhɛtˈzaˑɪlt] (He (has) sailed), Standard German: segeln; er ist gesegelt/er segelte
- kopen [ˈkʰoʊpm̩] (to buy): Wi harrn köfft [vihaːŋˈkœft] (We had bought), Standard German: kaufen; wir haben gekauft/wir kauften
- kamen [ˈkɒːm̩] (to come): Ji sünd kamen [ɟizʏŋˈkɒːm̩] (You (all) have come/You came), Standard German: kommen; ihr seid gekommen/ihr kamt
- eten [ˈeːtn̩] (to eat): Se hebbt eten [zɛɪhɛptˈʔeːtn̩] (They have eaten/They ate), Standard German: essen; sie haben gegessen/sie aßen

The diminutive (-je) (Dutch and East Frisian Low Saxon -tje, Eastphalian -ke, High German -chen, Alemannic -le, li) is hardly used. Some examples are Buscherumpje, a fisherman's shirt, or lüttje, a diminutive of lütt, little. Instead the adjective lütt is used, e.g. dat lütte Huus, de lütte Deern, de lütte Jung.

There are a lot of special characteristics in the vocabulary, too, but they are shared partly with other languages and dialects, e.g.:

- Personal pronouns: ik [ɪk] (like Dutch ik, standard German form ich), du [du] (like German Du, standard German form du), he [hɛɪ] (like Dutch hij, standard German form er), se [zɛɪ] (like Dutch zij, standard German form sie), dat [dat] (Dutch dat, standard German form es/das), wi [vi], ji [ɟi] (similar to English ye, Dutch jij, standard German forms wir, ihr), se [zɛɪ] (standard German form sie).
- Interrogatives (English/High German): wo [voʊ], woans [voʊˈʔaˑns] (how/wie), wo laat [voʊˈlɒːt] (how late/wie spät), wokeen [voʊˈkʰɛˑɪn] (who/wer), woneem [voʊˈneːm] (where/wo), wokeen sien [voʊˈkʰɛˑɪnziːn] / wen sien [vɛˑnziːn] (whose/wessen)
- Adverbs (English/High German): laat [lɒːt] (late/spät), gau [ɡaˑʊ] (fast/schnell), suutje [ˈzutɕe] (slowly, carefully/langsam, vorsichtig, from Dutch zoetjes [ˈzutɕəs] ‘nice and easy’, adverbial diminutive of zoet [ˈzut] ‘sweet’), vigeliensch [fiɡeˈliːnʃ] (difficult, tricky/schwierig)
- Prepositions (English/High German): bi [biː] (by, at/bei), achter [ˈaxtɐ] (behind/hinter), vör [fœɐ̯] (before, in front of/vor), blangen [ˈblaˑŋ̍] (beside, next to, alongside/neben), twüschen [ˈtvʏʃn̩] (betwixt, between/zwischen), mang, mank [maˑŋk] (among/unter)

== See also ==
- Languages of Germany
- Middle Low German
