= Gronings dialect =

Friso-Saxon dialect group

Gronings; Groninger
- Grunnegs, Grönnegs
- Native to: Netherlands: Groningen, parts in the north and east of Drenthe, the easternmost part of the Frisian municipality Noardeast-Fryslân
- Region: Groningen
- Native speakers: 590,000 (2003)
- Language family: Indo-European: Germanic; West Germanic; North Sea Germanic; Low German; Low Saxon; Northern Low Saxon; Gronings; Groninger
- Writing system: Latin

Official status
- Recognised minority language in: Netherlands (as Low Saxon)

Language codes
- ISO 639-3: gos
- Glottolog: gron1242
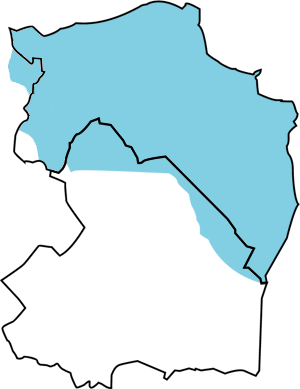
- Gronings area (blue) in Groningen and Drenthe provinces

The Gronings (Dutch pronunciation: [ˈɣroːnɪŋs]) (or Groninger) dialects or language, known in Gronings itself as Grunnegs or Grönnegs, are some of the Low Saxon dialects spoken in the province of Groningen and around the Groningen border in Drenthe and Friesland. Gronings and the strongly related varieties in East Frisia have a strong East Frisian influence and take a remarkable position within Low Saxon. Its typical accent and vocabulary differ strongly from the other Low Saxon dialects.

== Area ==
The name Gronings can almost be defined geographically, as can be seen on the map below. This is especially true for the northern part of Drenthe (number 8 on that map). Drents, spoken in the north of the province of Drenthe (Noordenveld) is somewhat related with the Groninger language, but the core linguistics is Drents. Veenkoloniaals is the Groningen dialect in an elongated part in the southeast of the province of Groningen. It is spoken in the east and southeast of Drenthe as well, more precisely: it's effectively the same. In the easternmost part of the Frisian municipality of Noardeast-Fryslân, the western dialect called Westerkwartiers is also spoken, as well as a separate Groningen dialect called Kollumerpompsters. The latter is spoken in the Frisian village of Kollumerpomp and has more West Frisian influences, while most Groningen dialects have a strong influence from the East Frisian language.

== Dialects ==
Gronings can be subdivided into eight dialects:

Subdivision of the Groningen dialects

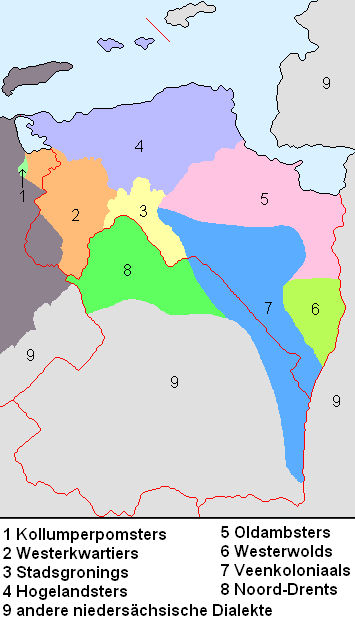

Gronings dialects in the provinces
of Groningen, Friesland, and Drenthe

1. Kollumerpompsters
2. Westerkwartiers
3. Stadjeders
4. Hogelandsters
5. Oldambtsters
6. Westerwolds
7. Veenkoloniaals
8. Noord-Drents

=== Example ===
Though there are several differences between the dialects, they form a single dialect group. Most words are written the same way, but the pronunciation can differ. The examples, all using the sentence "The only thing we're not doing is giving out sweets", show the pronunciation.

- Westerkertiers: t Eenege dat wie niet doun is slik uutdeeln.
- Stadsgrunnegs (city): t Oinege dat wie noit doun is baaltjes oetdailn.
- Hoogelaandsters: t Ainege dat wie nait dudden is slik oetdijln.
- Westerwoolds: t Einege dat wie nich dun is slikkerij uutdeiln.
- Veenkelonioals: t Ainege wat wie nait dudden is slikke uutduiln.
- East Frisian Low Saxon: Dat eenzige, dat wi neet doon is Slickeree utdelen.
- North German Low Saxon: Dat eenzige, dat wi nich doot, (dat) is Snabbelkraam uutdeeln.
- Standard Dutch: Het enige wat we niet doen is snoep uitdelen.
- Standard German: Das einzige, was wir nicht machen [="was wir nicht tun"], ist Süßigkeiten austeilen.

== Classification ==
There are many uncertainties about the classification and categorization of Gronings. Words used in classifying it are often more political than linguistic, because it encompasses a large group of very differing varieties. Some linguists see it as a variety of Low German, also called Nedersaksisch in the Netherlands, but there is controversy surrounding whether all the dialects that have been called Low German are similar enough to be placed in one category.

Other linguists, especially in Germany, see Gronings–East Frisian as a separate group of German dialects. The East Frisian influence, the sounds ou, ai and ui and the typical accent are part of that distinction. Other linguists categorize all Gronings–East Frisian dialects as part of North Low German. When that is the case, all the other Low German varieties in the Netherlands are categorized as Westphalian.

Dutch linguists in particular have classified Gronings as Dutch Low Saxon. In this case the Dutch influence is seen as an essential factor contrasting with the greater influence of High German languages found in the dialects on the other side of the national border. These influences concern especially the vocabulary: for example the Dutch word "voorbeeld" is "veurbeeld" in Gronings, while the East Frisian dialects use "biespööl", related to the High German word "beispiel". From this point of view the separation is not between Westphalian and Groningen–East Frisian (or North Low Saxon), but rather between Groningen on one side and East Frisian on the other, with the national border also functioning as the linguistic border.

== Origin ==
The Gronings dialects are a kind of mix between two languages: Old Frisian (East Frisian) and Middle Low German. East Frisian was spoken in the Ommelanden (surrounding lands of the city of Groningen), while the city, the surrounding rural area called Gorecht and the eastern lordship of Westerwolde were Low Saxon. When the city of Groningen developed an important position in the Ommelanden, a switch from East Frisian to Saxon occurred, although it was not a complete switch because there are many East Frisian influences in the "new" Groningen language. Many East Frisian words and grammatic features are still in use today. In less than one century, the same process also started in East Frisia, from the city of Emden, which was influenced by the Hanseatic League. This explains the strong relation between both varieties.

In the second half of the 16th century Gronings started to evolve towards Middle Dutch because of the strong influence of the new standard language. But because of the political, geographical and cultural isolation of Groningen, a strong provincialism in the first half of the 19th century caused Gronings to develop itself in a significant way. The sounds that are used today were formed in this period.

== Usage ==
=== Daily life ===
Today, according to an investigation among the listeners to the regional broadcasting station (Radio Noord), approximately 65% of them can speak and write Gronings. Perhaps, if the larger cities and villages of Groningen, Hoogezand-Sappemeer, Veendam, Stadskanaal, Delfzijl and Winschoten are excluded from this count, the percentage would rise to about 80%. Of course, this is not a representative picture of the linguistic capacity of the inhabitants of Groningen province. Most of the older people use Gronings as their main language. Until the second half of the 20th century, Gronings was more important in Groningen than Dutch. Younger people also speak the language, however in a regiolectical mixed way, because many pure Gronings words are lost. The youngest generation passed to Dutch. Since the second half of the 20th century, the usage of the language is declining. Because of globalization, other languages like Dutch and English are becoming more important. Parents today choose to raise their children in the Dutch language.

=== Media ===
In the media Gronings is used frequently. For example, on the local radio station Radio Noord, Gronings is used by the presenters and listeners. On local television Gronings is used less, but the weather forecast is always presented in Gronings. The news is always presented in Dutch, since not all viewers understand Gronings. In the second half of 2007, the local television broadcast a series in Gronings called Boven Wotter. Another program that is in and about Gronings is Grunnegers, which is actually some kind of education in Gronings.

Examples of Gronings magazines are Toal en Taiken (language and signs) and Krödde, which actually means cannabis.

There are many Gronings dictionaries as well. The first official dictionary was the "Nieuw Groninger Woordenboek" and was put together by Kornelis ter Laan. This dictionary and the writing system used in the book became the basics of each dictionary and writing system ever since.

More recent is "Zakwoordenboek Gronings – Nederlands / Nederlands – Gronings" by Siemon Reker, which is a little less specific. K. G. Pieterman wrote a dictionary of Gronings alliterations which is titled Gezondhaid en Groutnis (sanity and greetings).

=== Education and culture ===
Although Gronings, as part of Low Saxon, is an official language, it is not a mandatory subject in schools. Still, many primary schools in Groningen choose to give attention to the regional language. This attention varies from inviting storytellers to teaching about the language. In secondary schools Gronings does not receive much attention.

At the University of Groningen it is possible to study the language. In October 2007 Gronings became an official study within the faculty of letteren (language and literature).

Another possible way to learn Gronings is taking classes. In the last few years the trend of people taking courses has risen. More and more people, also people from outside who come to live in the area in which Gronings is spoken, are interested in the language and are willing to take courses. There are two types of courses. The first one is understanding and the second one is understanding and speaking.

Every year around March Het Huis van de Groninger Cultuur (English: House of the Groningen Culture) organises a writing contest in every municipality in Groningen. Everyone can participate and send in a poem or some prose. The winners of the different ages succeed to the provincial round.

=== Music ===
Notable Groningen musical artists include Wia Buze, Alje van Bolhuis, Alex Vissering, Eltje Doddema, Pé Daalemmer & Rooie Rinus, Burdy, Wat Aans!, Hail Gewoon, Erwin de Vries, and Ede Staal (†). Every year the supply of successful artists in regional languages in the Netherlands is rising.

== Frisian substratum ==
Some linguists classify Gronings to North Low Saxon, to which also East Frisian Low Saxon belongs. Both related dialects are characterized by an East Frisian influence. Hence other linguists classify Gronings-East Frisian as a separate group of Northwest Low Saxon or Friso-Saxon dialects. The most important similarities are grammar features and the vocabulary. The most important differences are the writing system and the loanwords. The East Frisian writing system is based on High German while Gronings uses many Dutch features. For example, the word for “ice skate” is in Gronings “scheuvel” and in East Frisian “Schöfel”, while the pronunciation is almost alike. Here are a few examples of words compared to West Frisian, East Frisian Low Saxon, German, Dutch and English.

West Frisian	East Frisian Low Saxon	Gronings	German	Dutch	English
Reed	Schöfel	Scheuvel	Schlittschuh	Schaats	Ice skate
Lyts	Lüttje	Lutje	Klein	Klein or Luttel	Little
Foarbyld	Bispööl/Bispill	Veurbeeld	Beispiel	Voorbeeld	Example
Bloet	Bloot/Blood [blaʊt]	Bloud	Blut	Bloed	Blood

The East Frisian combination oo (for example in Bloot/Blood = blood) is pronounced like ow in the English word “now” ([aʊ]) ([blaʊt]; Gronings: blowd). In some parts of the Rheiderland they say blyowt, which is a leftover of Frisian in this area. The East Frisian combination aa (for example in quaad) is pronounced like a in the British English word “water” ([ɔː]). In Gronings this sound is written like oa. The word water would be written like “woatah” in Gronings. The pronunciation of the word “quaad” is similar to the Gronings word “kwoad”, which means “angry”. The East Frisian combination ee and eei (for example in neet) are pronounced like the y in the English word “fly” ([aɪ]) ([naɪt]; Gronings: nyt)*.

== Linguistic distance from Standard Dutch ==
After Limburgish, Gronings is the dialect with the farthest distance from Standard Dutch. Reasons for this are vocabulary and pronunciation. The Gronings vocabulary is quite different from Dutch, for example:

Gronings: Doe hest n hail ìnde luu dij scheuvellopen kinnen, pronounced: [du‿ɛst‿n̩ ɦaɪ̯l‿ɪndə ly daɪ̯‿sχøːvəloːʔm̩ kɪnː]
Dutch: Jij hebt heel veel werknemers (werklui) die kunnen schaatsen, pronounced: [jə ˈɦɛpt ˈɦeːl veːl ˈʋɛr(ə)kˌneːmərs ti ˈkʏnə(n) ˈsxaːtsə(n)]
English: You have a lot of employees who can ice skate

The pronunciation differs from the writing system. The -en ending of many words is pronounced like (ə or ən) in most varieties of Dutch. In Gronings and many other Low Saxon dialects these words are pronounced with a glottal stop, thus making the words ending in [ʔŋ], [ʔn] or [ʔm]. The Groningen people speak quite fast compared to the Dutch people, with the result that a lot of words are pronounced together as one word.

Gronings is also a dialect with many unique expressions. One third of the language consists of these expressions. In the example sentence n hail ìnde is an example of those expressions. Many of these are given in the 'Nieuwe Groninger Woordenboek' by K. ter Laan published in 1977, (1280pp).

Because of this far distance from Standard Dutch and the official status of the neighbouring West Frisian, Gronings is considered as a separate language by some of its native speakers, while linguists consider it part of Dutch Low Saxon.

== Phonology ==
=== Consonants ===
		Labial	Alveolar	Dorsal	Glottal
Stop	voiceless	p	t	k	
Stop	voiced	b	d	(ɡ)	
Fricative	voiceless	f	s	χ	(h)
Fricative	voiced	v	z	ɣ	ɦ
Nasal		m	n	ŋ	
Trill			r		
Approximant		ʋ	l	j	

- /ʋ/ occurring before and after rounded vowels is pronounced as a labio-velar approximant [w].
- /ɡ/ only occurs in the word-medial position.
- /ɦ/ may also be heard as voiceless [h] in free variation.
- Other word-final consonants occur as syllabic, as a variant of a schwa sound /ə/ before a consonant (e.g. [əl] ~ [l̩]).

=== Vowels ===
	Front				Central	Back	
	unrounded		rounded		Central	Back	
	short	long	short	long	Central	short	long
Close	i	iː	y	yː		u	uː
Close-mid	ɪ	eː	ʏ	øː	ə	ʊ	oː
Open-mid	ɛ		œ		ə	ɔ	ɔː
Open					aː	ɑ	

Diphthongs
	Front		Back
Mid	ɛi	œy	ɔu
Open			ɑi

- The starting point of /ɑi/ varies from back [ɑ] to front [æ].

== Example ==
A Gronings speaker, recorded in the Netherlands.

Lord’s Prayer

Os Voader in Hemel, (litt. Our Father in Heaven)
dat Joen Noam haailegd worden zel, (litt. May Thy name be hallowed)
dat Joen Keunenkriek kommen mag, (litt. May Thy kingdom come)
dat Joen wil doan wordt (litt. May Thy will be done)
op Eerd net as in hemel. (litt. On earth, like in heaven)
t Stoet doar wie verlet om hebben (litt. The bread we need so badly)
geef os dat vandoag, (litt. give it to us today)
en reken os nait tou wat wie verkeerd doun, (litt. And do not blame us for the things we do wrong)
net zo as wie vergeven elk dij os wat aandut. (litt. As we forgive those who trespass against us)
En breng os nait in verlaaiden, (litt. And lead us not into temptation)
mor wil van verlaaider ons verlözzen. (litt. But deliver us from the tempter)
Den Joe binnen t Keunenkriek, (litt. Because Thou art the kingdom)
de Kracht en de Heerlekhaid. (litt. the Power and the Glory)
Veur in aiweghaid. (litt. For eternity)
Amen

== Vocabulary ==
The Gronings vocabulary is strongly related to East Frisian Low Saxon, Saterfrisian and West Frisian. However, today the Gronings vocabulary is in decline. More and more Gronings words are being replaced by Dutch words that have been "Groningized". For example, the word "stevel" (boot, German "Stiefel") is sometimes replaced by the word "leers" (Dutch "laars"). Although most people do know the Gronings words, they are less and less used, for example because people think others will not understand them or because they are too long and the Dutch word is much easier. An example of the latter is the word for sock, which is "Hozevörrel" in Gronings. The Dutch word "sok" is much easier, so it is more often used than hozevörrel.

Some often used Gronings words are listed below:

Gronings	Dutch	English
aingoal	voortdurend	continuously
aine	iemand	someone
akkenail	dakkapel	dormer
beune	zolder	loft
boksem	broek	trousers
bolle	stier	bull
boudel	boel; toestand	mess
bözzem	schoorsteenmantel	mantelpiece
dammit	zometeen	right away
edik	azijn	vinegar
eelsk	verwaand; aanstellerig	affected
eerdappel/eerpel	aardappel	potato
elkenain	iedereen	everyone
gounend	een aantal (mensen)	some (people)
hounder; tuten	kippen	chickens
hupzelen	bretels	braces (AmE suspenders)
jeuzeln	zeuren; janken	to nag
jirre	vies water	dirty liquid
graimen, klaaien	morsen	to make grimy
kloede	klont; dik persoon	lump; fat person
koare	kruiwagen	wheelbarrow
kopstubber	ragebol	round ceiling mop
kribben	ruzie maken	to wrangle
krudoorns	kruisbessen	gooseberry
leeg	laag	low
liepen	huilen	crying
loug	dorp	village
lutje	klein; luttel	little
mishottjen	mislukken	to fail
mous	boerenkool	kale
mug	vlieg	housefly
neefie	mug	mosquito
"Om toch!"	"Daarom!" (nietszeggend antwoord op vraag met "waarom")	"Because I say so!" (meaningless answer to a "why" question)
opoe	oma	grandmother
poeppetoon; Woalse boon	tuinbonen	broad bean; fava bean
puut	(plastic) zak	(plastic) bag
plof(fiets)	brommer	moped (motorized bicycle)
rebait	rode biet	(red) beet
raive	gereedschap	tools
schraaien	huilen	to weep
siepel	ui	onion
sikkom	bijna	around
slaif	pollepel	ladle
slik	snoep	sweets (AmE candy)
slim	erg	very badly
smok	zoen	kiss
spèren; spijen	braken; spugen	vomiting; spewing
stoer	moeilijk	difficult
steekruif	koolraap	turnip
riepe	stoep	pavement (AmE sidewalk)
verlet hebben van	nodig hebben	to need (badly)
vernaggeln	vernielen	to demolish
weg; vot	vandaan	from (as in "Where do you come from?")
wicht	meisje	girl
wied	ver	far
zedel	folder	leaflet
