= Aduard =

Aduard Auwerd (Gronings)
- Village
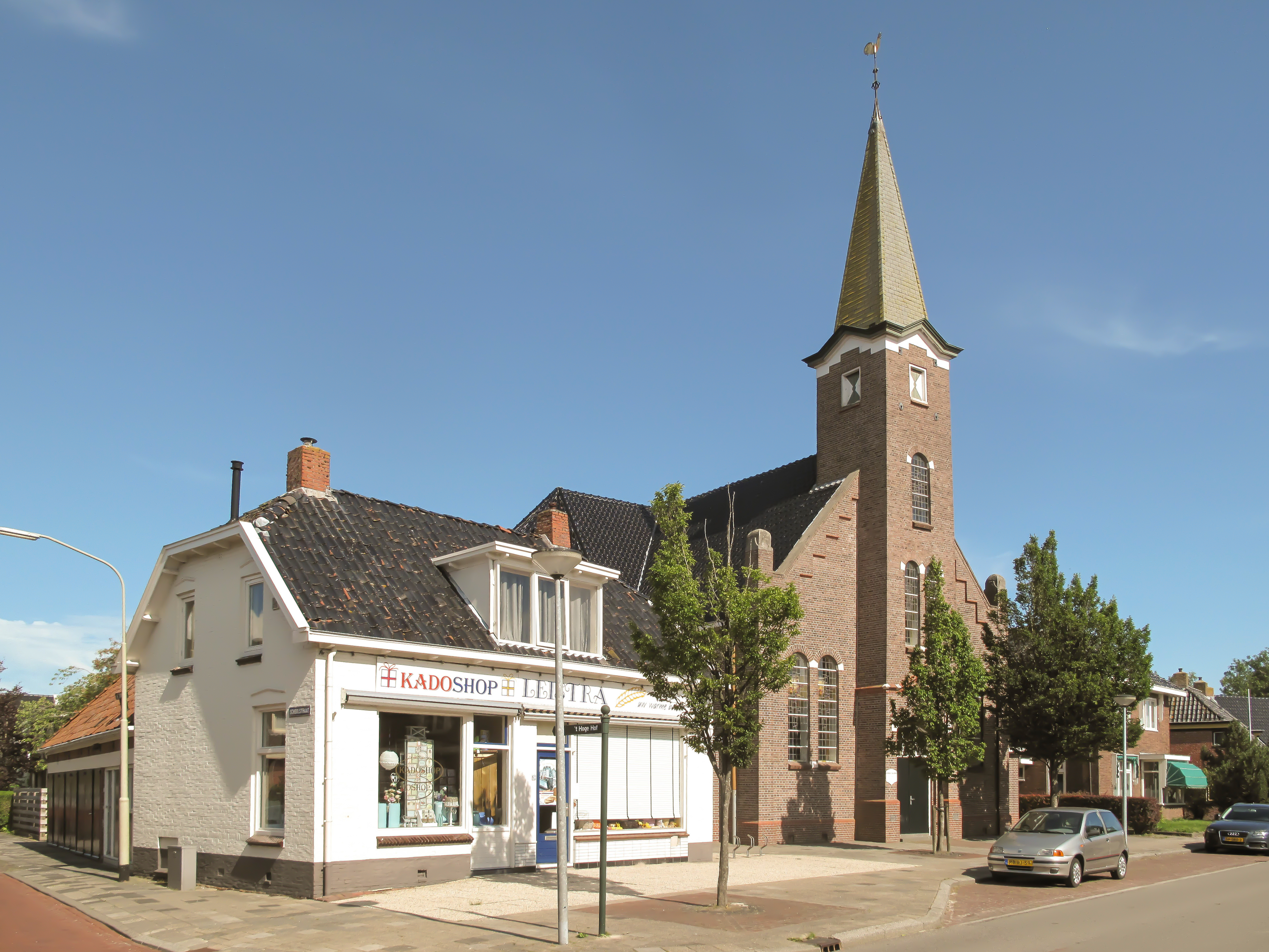
- Reformed church in 2013

- Flag Coat of arms

- Location of Aduard in the province of Groningen Aduard (Netherlands)
- Coordinates: 53°15′17″N 6°27′36″E
- Country: Netherlands
- Province: Groningen
- Municipality: Westerkwartier

Area
  - Total: 0.96 km^{2} (0.37 sq mi)

Population (2023)
  - Total: 2,095
  - Density: 2,200/km^{2} (5,700/sq mi)
- Postal code: 9831

Aduard (Dutch: [ˈaːdyɑrt]; Gronings: Auwerd [ˈau̯wərt]) is a village in the municipality of Westerkwartier, in the Netherlands. It is located about 8 km northwest of Groningen. As of 1 January 2023, it had a population of 2,095.

The history of Aduard dates back to the foundation in 1192 of the Cistercian Aduard Abbey, where famous early Humanists like Rodolphus Agricola and Wessel Gansfort studied and lectured. The centre of the village is dominated by the so-called Abdijkerk (abbey church), one of the last visible remains of the erstwhile prestigious monastery. It is suggested that this building, currently in use by the Protestant congregation, was originally the monastery's infirmary.

Aduard's Abbey Museum (Kloostermuseum) provides further information about the Abbey's history, including archeological findings and a model and 3D animation of the original abbey complex. In the museum backyard, one may also find an oven used to make the original style of brick (kloostermoppen) used for the construction of the Abbey.

Until 1990, Aduard was a separate municipality.

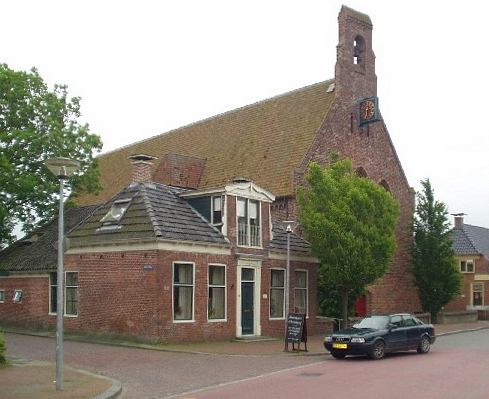
Building from Aduard Abbey in 2005
