= Commonly misspelled words in German =

Misspellings in German are a subcategory of orthographical errors (German: Rechtschreibfehler), and counter the rules of German orthography. However, there is some variation following the current 'optional' status of the German spelling reform of 1996.

Misspelling in German is less common than in English since most words are spelled as they are pronounced. Exceptions do, however, occur, as for the (in modern German) identical "ä" and "e" both representing the IPA [ε] sound. Confusion can also occur with homonyms as verb prefixes: wiederspiegeln (incorrect) and widerspiegeln (correct).

Misspellings of German words outside Germany also occur – for example, by Bram Stoker and James Joyce.
