= German orthography =

Orthography used in writing the German language

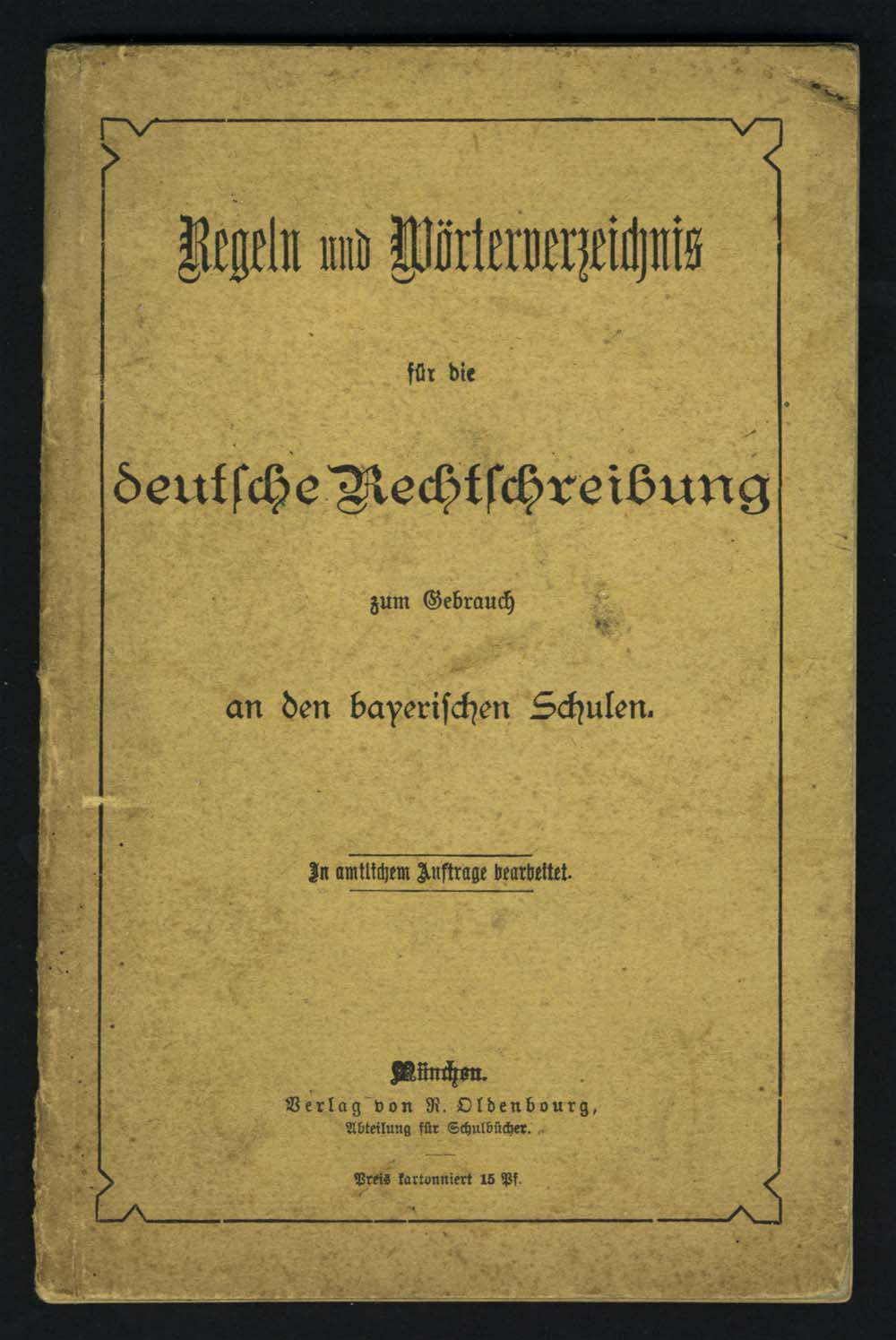
Rules and a word list for German spelling for use in Bavarian schools. Edited by official order. Munich. R. Oldenbourg Publishing House, Schoolbook Department.

German orthography is the orthography used in writing the German language, which is largely phonemic. However, it shows many instances of spellings that are historic or analogous to other spellings rather than phonemic. The pronunciation of almost every word can be derived from its spelling once the spelling rules are known, but the opposite is not generally the case.

Today, Standard High German orthography is regulated by the Rat für deutsche Rechtschreibung (Council for German Orthography), composed of representatives from most German-speaking countries.

== Alphabet ==
German alphabet
(Listen to a German speaker recite the alphabet in German)

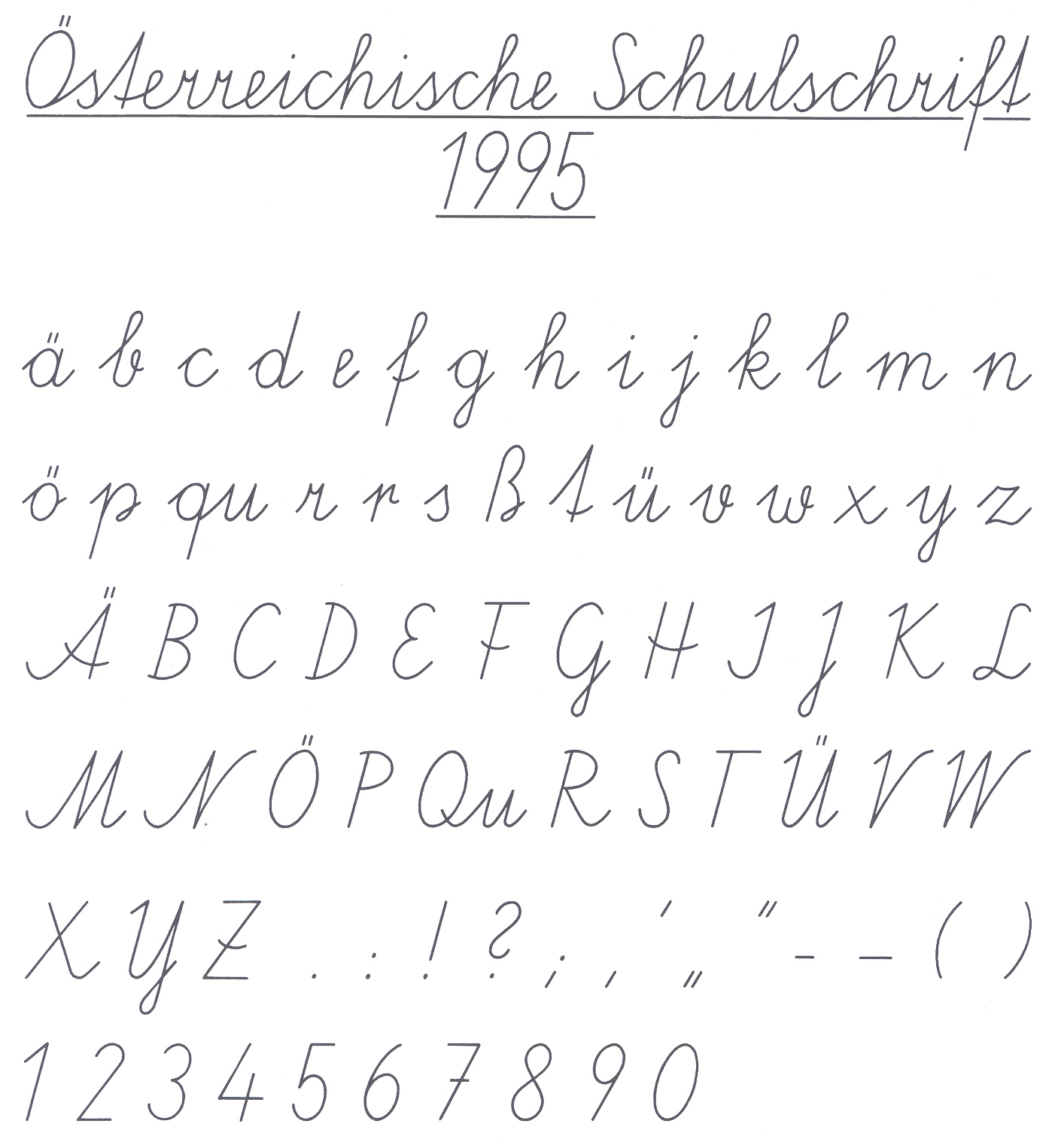
Austria's standardized cursive

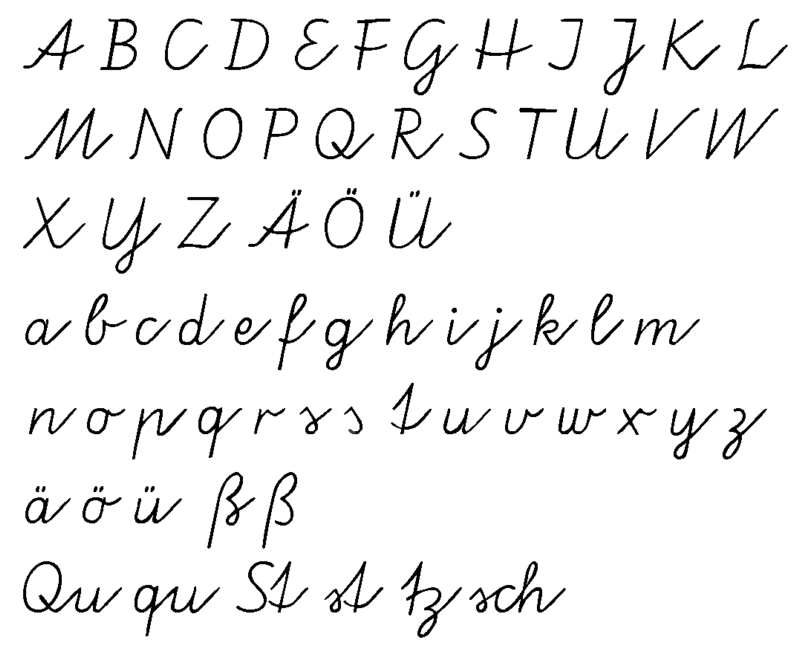
Vereinfachte Ausgangsschrift

The modern German alphabet consists of the twenty-six letters of the ISO basic Latin alphabet plus four special letters.

=== Basic alphabet ===
| Letter | | Name | Name (IPA) | Spelling Alphabet |
|---|---|---|---|---|
| A | a | A | /aː/ | Anton |
| B | b | Be | /beː/ | Berta |
| C | c | Ce | /t͡seː/ | Cäsar |
| D | d | De | /deː/ | Dora |
| E | e | E | /eː/ | Emil |
| F | f | Ef | /ɛf/ | Friedrich |
| G | g | Ge | /ɡeː/ | Gustav |
| H | h | Ha | /haː/ | Heinrich |
| I | i | I | /iː/ | Ida |
| J | j | Jott, (Note: In Germany); Je (Note: In Austria) | /jɔt/ /jeː/ | Julius |
| K | k | Ka | /kaː/ | Kaufmann, Konrad |
| L | l | El | /ɛl/ | Ludwig |
| M | m | Em | /ɛm/ | Martha |
| N | n | En | /ɛn/ | Nordpol |
| O | o | O | /oː/ | Otto |
| P | p | Pe | /peː/ | Paula |
| Q | q | Qu, Que | /kuː/ /kveː/ | Quelle |
| R | r | Er | /ɛʁ/ | Richard |
| S | s | Es | /ɛs/ | Samuel, Siegfried |
| T | t | Te | /teː/ | Theodor |
| U | u | U | /uː/ | Ulrich |
| V | v | Vau | /faʊ̯/ | Viktor |
| W | w | We | /veː/ | Wilhelm |
| X | x | Ix | /ɪks/ | Xanthippe, Xavier |
| Y | y | Ypsilon | /ˈʏpsilɔn/ /ʏˈpsiːlɔn/ | Ypsilon |
| Z | z | Zett | /t͡sɛt/ | Zacharias, Zürich |

=== Special letters ===
German has four special letters; three are vowels accented with an umlaut sign (⟨ä, ö, ü⟩) and one is derived from a ligature of ⟨ſ⟩ (long s) and ⟨z⟩ (⟨ß⟩; called Eszett "ess-zed/zee" or scharfes S "sharp s"). They have their own names separate from the letters they are based on.

German extra letters
(Listen to a German speaker naming these letters)

| Letter | | Name | Name (IPA) | Spelling Alphabet |
|---|---|---|---|---|
| Ä | ä | Ä | /ɛː/ | Ärger |
| Ö | ö | Ö | /øː/ | Ökonom, (Note: In Germany); Österreich (Note: In Austria) |
| Ü | ü | Ü | /yː/ | Übermut, Übel |
| ẞ | ß | Eszett, scharfes S | /ɛsˈt͡sɛt/ /ˈʃaʁfəs ɛs/ | Eszett, scharfes S |

- Capital ẞ was declared an official letter of the German alphabet on 29 June 2017. Previously represented as ⟨SS/SZ⟩.
- Historically, long s (ſ) was used as well, as in English and many other European languages.

While the Council for German Orthography considers ⟨ä, ö, ü, ß⟩ distinct letters, disagreement on how to categorize and count them has led to a dispute over the exact number of letters the German alphabet has, the number ranging between 26 (considering special letters as variants of ⟨a, o, u, s⟩) and 30 (counting all special letters separately).

== Use of special letters ==
=== Umlaut diacritic usage ===
The accented letters ⟨ä, ö, ü⟩ are used to indicate the presence of umlauts (fronting of back vowels). Before the introduction of the printing press, frontalization was indicated by placing an ⟨e⟩ after the back vowel to be modified, but German printers developed the space-saving typographical convention of replacing the full ⟨e⟩ with a small version placed above the vowel to be modified. In German Kurrent writing, the superscripted ⟨e⟩ was simplified to two vertical dashes (as the Kurrent ⟨e⟩ consists largely of two short vertical strokes), which have further been reduced to dots in both handwriting and German typesetting. Although the two dots of umlaut look like those in the diaeresis (trema), the two have different origins and functions.

When it is not possible to use the umlauts (for example, when using a restricted character set) the characters ⟨Ä, Ö, Ü, ä, ö, ü⟩ should be transcribed as ⟨Ae, Oe, Ue, ae, oe, ue⟩ respectively, following the earlier postvocalic-⟨e⟩ convention; simply using the base vowel (e.g., ⟨u⟩ instead of ⟨ü⟩) would be wrong and misleading. However, such transcription should be avoided if possible, especially with names. Names often exist in different variants, such as Müller and Mueller, and with such transcriptions in use one could not work out the correct spelling of the name.

Automatic back-transcribing is wrong not only for names. Consider, for example, das neue Buch ("the new book"). This should never be changed to das neü Buch, as the second ⟨e⟩ is completely separate from the ⟨u⟩ and does not even belong in the same syllable; neue ([ˈnɔʏ.ə]) is neu (the root for "new") followed by ⟨e⟩, an inflection. The word ⟨neü⟩ does not exist in German.

Furthermore, in northern and western Germany, there are family names and place names in which ⟨e⟩ lengthens the preceding vowel (by acting as a Dehnungs-e), as in the former Dutch orthography, such as Straelen, which is pronounced with a long ⟨a⟩, not an ⟨ä⟩. Similar cases are Coesfeld and Bernkastel-Kues.

In proper names and ethnonyms, there may also appear a rare ⟨ë⟩ and ⟨ï⟩, which are not letters with an umlaut, but a diaeresis, used as in French and English to distinguish what could be a digraph, for example, ⟨ai⟩ in Karaïmen, ⟨eu⟩ in Alëuten, ⟨ie⟩ in Piëch, ⟨oe⟩ in von Loë and Hoëcker (although Hoëcker added the diaeresis himself), and ⟨ue⟩ in Niuë. Occasionally, a diaeresis may be used in some well-known names, i.e.: Italiën (usually written as Italien).

Swiss keyboards and typewriters do not allow easy input of uppercase letters with umlauts (nor ⟨ß⟩) because their positions are taken by the most frequent French diacritics. Uppercase umlauts were dropped because they are less common than lowercase ones (especially in Switzerland). Geographical names in particular are supposed to be written with ⟨a, o, u⟩ plus ⟨e⟩, except Österreich. The omission can cause some inconvenience, since the first letter of every noun is capitalized in German.

Unlike in Hungarian, the exact shape of the umlaut diacritics – especially when handwritten – is not important, because they are the only ones in the language (not counting the tittle on ⟨i⟩ and ⟨j⟩). They will be understood whether they look like dots (⟨¨⟩), acute accents (⟨ ˝ ⟩) or vertical bars (⟨^{‖}⟩). A horizontal bar (macron, ⟨¯⟩), a breve (⟨˘⟩), a tiny ⟨N⟩ or ⟨e⟩, a tilde (⟨˜⟩), and such variations are often used in stylized writing (e.g., logos). However, the breve – or the ring (⟨°⟩) – was traditionally used in some scripts to distinguish a ⟨u⟩ from an ⟨n⟩. In rare cases, the ⟨n⟩ was underlined. The breved ⟨u⟩ was common in some Kurrent-derived handwritings; it was mandatory in Sütterlin.

=== Sharp s ===
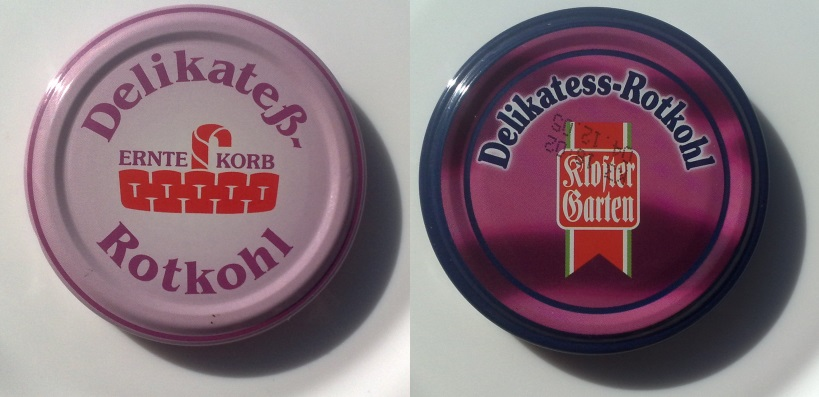
German label "Delicacy / red cabbage". Left cap is with old orthography, right with new.

Eszett or scharfes S (⟨ß⟩) represents the "s" sound. In the current orthography, the letter is used only after long vowels and diphthongs. Prior to the German spelling reform of 1996, it was used additionally whenever the letter combination ⟨ss⟩ occurred at the end of a syllable or word. It is not used in Switzerland and Liechtenstein.

As ⟨ß⟩ derives from a ligature of lowercase letters, it is exclusively used in the middle or at the end of a word. The proper transcription when it cannot be used is ⟨ss⟩ (⟨sz⟩ and ⟨SZ⟩ in earlier times). This transcription can give rise to ambiguities, albeit rarely; one such case is in Maßen "in moderation" vs. in Massen "in large amounts". In all-caps, ⟨ß⟩ is replaced by ⟨SS⟩ or, optionally, by the uppercase ⟨ß⟩. The uppercase ⟨ß⟩ was included in Unicode 5.1 as U+1E9E in 2008. Since 2010 its use is mandatory in official documentation in Germany when writing geographical names in all-caps. The option of using the uppercase ⟨ẞ⟩ in all-caps was officially added to the German orthography in 2017.

== Sorting ==
There are three ways to deal with the umlauts in alphabetic sorting.

1. Treat them like their base characters, as if the umlaut were not present (DIN 5007-1, section 6.1.1.4.1). This is the preferred method for dictionaries, where umlauted words (Füße "feet") should appear near their origin words (Fuß "foot"). In words which are the same except for one having an umlaut and one its base character (e.g., Müll vs. Mull), the word with the base character gets precedence.
2. Decompose them (invisibly) to vowel plus ⟨e⟩ (DIN 5007-2, section 6.1.1.4.2). This is often preferred for personal and geographical names, wherein the characters are used unsystematically, as in German telephone directories (Müller, A.; Mueller, B.; Müller, C.).
3. They are treated like extra letters either placed
  1. after their base letters (Austrian phone books have ⟨ä⟩ between ⟨az⟩ and ⟨b⟩ etc.) or
  2. at the end of the alphabet (as in Swedish or in extended ASCII).

Microsoft Windows in German versions offers the choice between the first two variants in its internationalization settings.

A sort of combination of nos. 1 and 2 also exists, in use in a couple of lexica: The umlaut is sorted with the base character, but an ⟨ae, oe, ue⟩ in proper names is sorted with the umlaut if it is actually spoken that way (with the umlaut getting immediate precedence). A possible sequence of names then would be Mukovic; Muller; Müller; Mueller; Multmann in this order.

Eszett is sorted as though it were ⟨ss⟩. Occasionally it is treated as ⟨s⟩, but this is generally considered incorrect. Words distinguished only by ⟨ß⟩ vs. ⟨ss⟩ are rare. The word with ⟨ß⟩ gets precedence, and Geschoß (story of a building; South German pronunciation) would be sorted before Geschoss (projectile).

Accents in French loanwords are always ignored in collation.

In rare contexts (e.g., in older indices) ⟨sch⟩ (phonetic value equal to English ⟨sh⟩) and likewise ⟨st⟩ and ⟨ch⟩ are treated as single letters, but the vocalic digraphs ⟨ai, ei⟩ (historically ⟨ay, ey⟩), ⟨au, äu, eu⟩ and the historic ⟨ui, oi⟩ never are.

=== Personal names with special characters ===
German names containing umlauts (⟨ä, ö, ü⟩) and/or ⟨ß⟩ are spelled in the correct way in the non-machine-readable zone of the passport, but with ⟨AE, OE, UE⟩ and/or ⟨SS⟩ in the machine-readable zone, e.g. ⟨Müller⟩ becomes ⟨MUELLER⟩, ⟨Weiß⟩ becomes ⟨WEISS⟩, and ⟨Gößmann⟩ becomes ⟨GOESSMANN⟩. The transcription mentioned above is generally used for aircraft tickets et cetera, but sometimes (like in US visas) simple vowels are used (MULLER, GOSSMANN). As a result, passport, visa, and aircraft ticket may display different spellings of the same name. The three possible spelling variants of the same name (e.g., Müller/Mueller/Muller) in different documents sometimes lead to confusion, and the use of two different spellings within the same document may give persons unfamiliar with German orthography the impression that the document is a forgery.

Even before the introduction of the capital ⟨ẞ⟩, it was recommended to use the minuscule ⟨ß⟩ as a capital letter in family names in documents (e.g., HEINZ GROßE, today's spelling: HEINZ GROẞE).

German naming law accepts umlauts and/or ⟨ß⟩ in family names as a reason for an official name change. Even a spelling change, e.g. from Müller to Mueller or from Weiß to Weiss is regarded as a name change.

== Features of German spelling ==
=== Capitalization ===
A typical feature of German spelling is the general capitalization of nouns and of most nominalized words. In addition, capital letters are used: at the beginning of sentences (may be used after a colon, when the part of a sentence after the colon can be treated as a sentence); in the formal pronoun Sie 'you' and the determiner Ihr 'your' (optionally in other second-person pronouns in letters); in adjectives at the beginning of proper names (e.g., der Stille Ozean 'the Pacific Ocean'); in adjectives with the suffix '-er' from geographical names (e.g., Berliner); in adjectives with the suffix '-sch' from proper names if written with the apostrophe before the suffix (e.g., Ohm'sches Gesetz 'Ohm's law', also written ohmsches Gesetz).

=== Compound words ===
Compound words, including nouns, are usually written together, e.g., Haustür (Haus + Tür; 'house door'), Tischlampe (Tisch + Lampe; 'table lamp'), Kaltwasserhahn (Kalt + Wasser + Hahn; 'cold water tap/faucet). This can lead to long words: the longest word in regular use, Rechtsschutzversicherungsgesellschaften ('legal protection insurance companies'), consists of 39 letters.

==== Hyphen in compound words ====
Compounds involving letters, abbreviations, or numbers (written in figures, even with added suffixes) are hyphenated: A-Dur 'A major', US-Botschaft 'US embassy', 10-prozentig 'with 10 percent', 10er-Gruppe 'group of ten'. The hyphen is used when adding suffixes to letters: n-te 'nth'. It is used in substantivated compounds such as Entweder-oder 'alternative' (literally 'either-or'); in phrase-word compounds such as Tag-und-Nacht-Gleiche 'equinox', Auf-die-lange-Bank-Schieben 'postponing' (substantivation of auf die lange Bank schieben 'to postpone'); in compounds of words containing hyphen with other words: A-Dur-Tonleiter 'A major scale'; in coordinated adjectives: deutsch-englisches Wörterbuch 'German-English dictionary'. Compound adjectives meaning colours are written with a hyphen if they mean two colours: rot-braun 'red and brown', but without a hyphen if they mean an intermediate colour: rotbraun 'reddish brown' (from the spelling reform of 1996 to the 2024 revision of the orthographic rules, both variants could be used in both meanings). Optionally the hyphen can be used to emphasize individual components, to clarify the meaning of complicated compounds, to avoid misunderstandings or when three identical letters occur together (in practice, in this case it is mostly used when writing nouns with triple vowels, e.g. See-Elefant 'elephant seal').

The hyphen is used in compounds where the second part or both parts are proper names, e.g. Foto-Hansen 'the photographer Hansen', Müller-Lüdenscheid 'Lüdenscheid, the city of millers', double-barrelled surnames such as Meyer-Schmidt; geographical names such as Baden-Württemberg. Double given names are variously written as Anna-Maria, Anna Maria, Annamaria. Some compound geographical names are written as one word (e.g. Nordkorea 'North Korea') or as two words (e.g. geographical names beginning with Sankt or Bad). The hyphen is not used when compounds with a proper name in the second part are used as common nouns, e.g. Heulsuse 'crybaby'; also in the name of the fountain Gänseliesel. The hyphen is used in words derived from proper names with hyphen, from proper names of more than one word, or from more than one proper name (optional in derivations with the suffix -er from geographical names from more than one word). Optionally the hyphen can be used in compounds where the first part is a proper name. Compounds of the type "geographical name+specification" are written with a hyphen or as two words: München-Ost or München Ost.

=== Vowel length ===
Even though vowel length is phonemic in German, it is not consistently represented. However, there are different ways of identifying long vowels:

- A vowel in an open syllable (a free vowel) is long, for instance in ge-ben ('to give'), sa-gen ('to say'). The rule is unreliable in given names, cf. Oliver [ˈɔlivɐ].
- It is rare to see a bare ⟨i⟩ used to indicate a long vowel /iː/. It occurs mainly in loanwords, e.g. Krise 'crisis', but also in some native German words, e.g. wir 'we', gib 'give (imperative)'. Mostly, the long vowel /iː/ is represented in writing by the digraph ⟨ie⟩, for instance in Liebe ('love'), hier ('here'). This use is a historical spelling based on the Middle High German diphthong /iə/ which was monophthongized in Early New High German. It has been generalized to words that etymologically never had that diphthong, for instance viel ('much'), Friede ('peace') (Middle High German vil, vride). Occasionally – typically in word-final position – this digraph represents /iː.ə/ as in the plural noun Knie /kniː.ə/ ('knees') (cf. singular Knie /kniː/). In the words Viertel (viertel) /ˈfɪrtəl/ ('quarter'), vierzehn /ˈfɪʁt͡seːn/ ('fourteen'), vierzig /ˈfɪʁt͡sɪç/ ('forty'), ⟨ie⟩ represents a short vowel, cf. vier /fiːɐ̯/ ('four'). In Fraktur, where capital ⟨I⟩ and ⟨J⟩ are identical or near-identical $\mathfrak{J}$, the combinations Ie and Je are confusable; hence ⟨ie⟩ is not used at the start of a word, for example Igel ('hedgehog'), Ire ('Irishman').
- A silent ⟨h⟩ indicates the vowel length in certain cases. That ⟨h⟩ derives from an old /x/ in some words, for instance sehen ('to see') zehn ('ten'), but in other words it has no etymological justification, for instance gehen ('to go') or mahlen ('to mill'). Occasionally a digraph can be redundantly followed by ⟨h⟩, either due to analogy, such as sieht ('sees', from sehen) or etymology, such as Vieh ('cattle', MHG vihe), rauh ('rough', pre-1996 spelling, now written rau, MHG ruh).
- The letters ⟨a, e, o⟩ are doubled in a few words that have long vowels, for instance Saat ('seed'), See ('sea'/'lake'), Moor ('moor').
- A doubled consonant after a vowel indicates that the vowel is short, while a single consonant often indicates the vowel is long, e.g. Kamm ('comb') has a short vowel /kam/, while kam ('came') has a long vowel /kaːm/. Two consonants are not doubled: ⟨k⟩, which is replaced by ⟨ck⟩ (until the spelling reform of 1996, however, ⟨ck⟩ was divided across a line break as ⟨k-k⟩), and ⟨z⟩, which is replaced by ⟨tz⟩. In loanwords, ⟨kk⟩ (which may correspond with ⟨cc⟩ in the original spelling) and ⟨zz⟩ can occur.
- For different consonants and for sounds represented by more than one letter (⟨ch⟩ and ⟨sch⟩) after a vowel, no clear rule can be given, because they can appear after long vowels, yet are not redoubled if belonging to the same stem, e.g. Mond /moːnt/ 'moon', Hand /hant/ 'hand'. On a stem boundary, reduplication usually takes place, e.g., nimm-t 'takes'; however, in fixed, no longer productive derivatives, this too can be lost, e.g., Geschäft /ɡəˈʃɛft/ 'business' despite schaffen 'to get something done'.
- ⟨ß⟩ indicates that the preceding vowel is long, e.g. Straße 'street' vs. a short vowel in Masse 'mass' or 'host'/'lot'. In addition to that, texts written before the 1996 spelling reform also use ⟨ß⟩ at the ends of words and before consonants, e.g. naß 'wet' and mußte 'had to' (after the reform spelled nass and musste), so vowel length in these positions could not be detected by the ⟨ß⟩, cf. Maß 'measure' and fußte 'was based' (both unaffected by the reform).

=== Double or triple consonants ===
Even though German does not have phonemic consonant length, there are many instances of doubled or even tripled consonants in the spelling. A single consonant following a checked vowel is doubled if another vowel follows, for instance immer 'always', lassen 'let'. These consonants are analyzed as ambisyllabic because they constitute not only the syllable onset of the second syllable but also the syllable coda of the first syllable, which must not be empty because the syllable nucleus is a checked vowel.

By analogy, if a word has one form with a doubled consonant, all forms of that word are written with a doubled consonant, even if they do not fulfill the conditions for consonant doubling; for instance, rennen 'to run' → er rennt 'he runs'; Küsse 'kisses' → Kuss 'kiss'.

Doubled consonants can occur in composite words when the first part ends in the same consonant the second part starts with, e.g. in the word Schaffell ('sheepskin', composed of Schaf 'sheep' and Fell 'skin, fur, pelt').

Composite words can also have tripled letters. While this is usually a sign that the consonant is actually spoken long, it does not affect the pronunciation per se: the ⟨fff⟩ in Sauerstoffflasche ('oxygen bottle', composed of Sauerstoff 'oxygen' and Flasche 'bottle') is exactly as long as the ff in Schaffell. According to the spelling before 1996, the three consonants would be shortened before vowels, but retained before consonants and in hyphenation, so the word Schifffahrt ('navigation, shipping', composed of Schiff 'ship' and Fahrt 'drive, trip, tour') was then written Schiffahrt, whereas Sauerstoffflasche already had a triple ⟨fff⟩. With the aforementioned change in ⟨ß⟩ spelling, even a new source of tripled consonant letters, namely the tripled consonant ⟨sss⟩, which in pre-1996 spelling could not occur as it was rendered ⟨ßs⟩, was introduced, e.g. Mussspiel ('compulsory round' in certain card games, composed of muss 'must' and Spiel 'game').

=== Typical letters ===
- ⟨ei⟩: This digraph represents the diphthong /aɪ̯/. The spelling goes back to the Middle High German pronunciation of that diphthong, which was [ei̯]. The spelling ⟨ai⟩ is found in only a very few native words (such as Saite 'string', Waise 'orphan') but is commonly used to romanize /aɪ̯/ in foreign loans from languages such as Chinese.
- ⟨eu⟩: This digraph represents the diphthong [ɔʏ̯], which goes back to the Middle High German monophthong [yː] represented by ⟨iu⟩. When the sound is created by umlaut of ⟨au⟩ [aʊ̯] (from MHG [uː]), it is spelled ⟨äu⟩.
- ⟨ß⟩: This letter alternates with ⟨ss⟩. For more information, see above.
- ⟨st, sp⟩: At the beginning of a word or syllable, these digraphs are pronounced [ʃt, ʃp]. In the Middle Ages, the sibilant that was inherited from Proto-Germanic /s/ was pronounced as an alveolo-palatal consonant [ɕ] or [ʑ] unlike the voiceless alveolar sibilant /s/ that had developed in the High German consonant shift. In the Late Middle Ages, certain instances of [ɕ] merged with /s/, but others developed into [ʃ]. The change to [ʃ] was represented in certain spellings such as Schnee 'snow', Kirsche 'cherry' (Middle High German snê, kirse). The digraphs ⟨st, sp⟩, however, remained unaltered.
- ⟨v⟩: The letter ⟨v⟩ occurs only in a few native words, and then it represents /f/. That goes back to the 12th and 13th century, when prevocalic /f/ was voiced to [v]. The voicing was lost again in the late Middle Ages, but the ⟨v⟩ still remains in certain words such as in Vogel (cf. Scandinavian fugl or English fowl) 'bird' (hence, ⟨v⟩ is sometimes called Vogel-vau), viel 'much'.
- ⟨w⟩: The letter ⟨w⟩ represents the sound /v/. In the 17th century, the former sound [w] became [v], but the spelling remained the same. An analogous sound change had happened in late-antique Latin.
- ⟨z⟩: The letter ⟨z⟩ represents the sound /t͡s/. The sound, a product of the High German consonant shift, has been written with ⟨z⟩ since Old High German in the 8th century.

=== Foreign words ===
For technical terms, the foreign spelling is often retained such as ⟨ph⟩ /f/ or ⟨y⟩ /yː/ in the word Physik (physics) of Greek origin. For some common affixes however, like -graphie or Photo-, it is allowed to use -grafie or Foto- instead. Both Photographie and Fotografie are correct, but the mixed variants *Fotographie or *Photografie are not.

For other foreign words, both the foreign spelling and a revised German spelling are correct such as Delphin / Delfin or Portemonnaie / Portmonee, though in the latter case the revised one does not usually occur.

For some words for which the Germanized form was common even before the reform of 1996, the foreign version is no longer allowed. A notable example is the word Foto "photograph", which may no longer be spelled as Photo. Other examples are Telephon (telephone) which was already Germanized as Telefon some decades ago or Bureau (office) which got replaced by the Germanized version Büro even earlier.

Except for the common sequences sch (/ʃ/), ch ([x] or [ç]) and ck (/k/), the letter ⟨c⟩ appears only in loanwords or in proper nouns. In many loanwords, including most words of Latin origin, the letter ⟨c⟩ pronounced (/k/) has been replaced by ⟨k⟩. Alternatively, German words which come from Latin words with ⟨c⟩ before ⟨e, i, y, ae, oe⟩ are usually pronounced with (/ts/) and spelled with ⟨z⟩. However, certain older spellings occasionally remain, mostly for decorative reasons, such as Circus instead of Zirkus.

The letter ⟨q⟩ in German appears only in the sequence ⟨qu⟩ (/kv/) except for loanwords such as Coq au Vin /kɔkoˈvɛ̃ː/ or Qigong /tʃiˈɡʊŋ/ (the spelling Chigong was also in use but is nowadays nonstandard).

The letter ⟨x⟩ (Ix, /ɪks/) occurs almost exclusively in loanwords such as Xylofon (xylophone) and names, e.g. Alexander and Xanthippe. Native German words now pronounced with a /ks/ sound are usually written using ⟨chs⟩ or ⟨(c)ks⟩, as with Fuchs (fox). Some exceptions occur such as Hexe (witch), Nixe (mermaid), Axt (axe) and Xanten.

The letter ⟨y⟩ (Ypsilon, /ˈʏpsilɔn/) occurs almost exclusively in loanwords, especially words of Greek origin, but some such words (such as Typ) have become so common that they are no longer perceived as foreign. It used to be more common in earlier centuries, and traces of this earlier usage persist in proper names. It is used either as an alternative letter for ⟨i⟩, for instance in Mayer / Meyer (a common family name that occurs also in the spellings Maier / Meier), or especially in the Southwest, as a representation of [iː] that goes back to an old IJ (digraph), for instance in Schwyz or Schnyder (an Alemannic variant of the name Schneider). Another notable exception is Bayern ("Bavaria") and derived words like bayrisch ("Bavarian"); this actually used to be spelt with an ⟨i⟩ until the King of Bavaria introduced the ⟨y⟩ as a sign of his philhellenism (his son would become King of Greece later).

The Latin and Ancient Greek diphthongs ⟨ae (αι)⟩ and ⟨oe (οι)⟩ are normally rendered as ⟨ä⟩ and ⟨ö⟩ in German, whereas English usually uses a simple ⟨e⟩ (but see List of English words that may be spelled with a ligature): Präsens 'present tense' (Latin tempus praesens), Föderation 'federation' (Latin foederatio).

The etymological spelling ⟨-ti-⟩ for the sounds [tsɪ̯] before vowels is used in many words of Latin origin, mostly ending in ⟨-tion⟩, but also ⟨-tiell, -tiös⟩, etc. Latin ⟨-tia⟩ in feminine nouns is typically simplified to ⟨-z⟩ in German; in related words, both ⟨-ti-⟩ and ⟨-zi-⟩ are allowed: Potenz 'power' (from Latin potentia), Potential/Potenzial 'potential' (noun), potentiell/potenziell 'potential' (adj.). Latin ⟨-tia⟩ in neuter plural nouns may be retained, but is also Germanized orthographically and morphologically to ⟨-zien⟩: Ingrediens 'ingredient', plural Ingredienzien; Solvens 'expectorant', plural Solventia or Solvenzien.

In loan words from the French language, spelling and accents are usually preserved. For instance, café in the sense of "coffeehouse" is always written Café in German; accentless Cafe would be considered erroneous, and the word cannot be written Kaffee, which means "coffee". (Café is normally pronounced /kaˈfeː/; Kaffee is mostly pronounced /ˈkafe/ in Germany but /kaˈfeː/ in Austria.) Thus, German typewriters and computer keyboards offer two dead keys: one for the acute and grave accents and one for circumflex. Other letters occur less often such as ⟨ç⟩ in loan words from French or Portuguese, and ⟨ñ⟩ in loan words from Spanish.

A number of loanwords from French are spelled in a partially adapted way: Quarantäne /kaʁanˈtɛːnə/ (quarantine), Kommuniqué /kɔmyniˈkeː, kɔmuniˈkeː/ (communiqué), Ouvertüre /u.vɛʁˈtyː.ʁə/ (overture) from French quarantaine, communiqué, ouverture. In Switzerland, where French is one of the official languages, people are less prone to use adapted and especially partially adapted spellings of loanwords from French and more often use original spellings, e.g. Communiqué.

In one curious instance, the word Ski ('ski') is pronounced as if it were *Schi all over the German-speaking areas (reflecting its pronunciation in its source language Norwegian), but only written that way in Austria.

== Grapheme-to-phoneme correspondences ==
This section lists German letters and letter combinations, and how to pronounce them transliterated into the International Phonetic Alphabet. This is the pronunciation of Standard German. Note that the pronunciation of standard German varies slightly from region to region. In fact, it is possible to tell where most German speakers come from by their accent in standard German (not to be confused with the different German dialects).

Foreign words are usually pronounced approximately as they are in the original language.

=== Consonants ===
Double consonants are pronounced as single consonants, except in compound words.

| Grapheme(s) | | Phoneme(s) | Notes |
|---|---|---|---|
| b | otherwise | [b] or [b̥] | |
| b | syllable final | [p] | |
| c | otherwise | [k] | Used in some loanwords and proper names. In many cases, ⟨k⟩ or ⟨z⟩ have replaced an etymological ⟨c⟩. In proper names, the letter ⟨c⟩ before ⟨ö⟩ may be pronounced either [ts] (e. g. Cölestin) or [k] (e. g. Cölbe). |
| c | before ⟨ä, e, i, ö⟩ | [ts] | Used in some loanwords and proper names. In many cases, ⟨k⟩ or ⟨z⟩ have replaced an etymological ⟨c⟩. In proper names, the letter ⟨c⟩ before ⟨ö⟩ may be pronounced either [ts] (e. g. Cölestin) or [k] (e. g. Cölbe). |
| ch | after ⟨a, o, u⟩ | [x] | In Austro-Bavarian, especially in Austria, [ç] may always be substituted by [x]. Word-initial ⟨ch⟩ is used only in loanwords. In words of Ancient Greek origin, word-initial ⟨ch⟩ is pronounced [k] before ⟨a, o, l, r⟩ (with rare exceptions : Charisma, where both [k] and [ç] are possible); normally [ç] before ⟨e, i, y⟩ (but [k] in Southern Germany and Austria); [ç] before ⟨th⟩. In the word Orchester and in geographical names such as Chemnitz or Chur, ⟨ch⟩ is [k] (Chur is also sometimes pronounced with [x]). |
| ch | after other vowels or consonants | [ç] | |
| ch | word-initially in words of Ancient Greek origin | [ç] or [k] | |
| ch | the suffix -chen | [ç] | |
| ch | In loanwords and foreign proper names | [tʃ], [ʃ] | |
| chs | within a morpheme (e.g. Dachs [daks] "badger") | [ks] | |
| chs | across a morpheme boundary (e.g. Dachs [daxs] "roof (gen.)") | [çs] or [xs] | |
| ck | | [k] | Follows short vowels |
| d | otherwise | [d] or [d̥] | |
| d | syllable final | [t] | |
| dsch | | [dʒ] or [tʃ] | Used in loanwords and transliterations only. Words borrowed from English can alternatively retain the original ⟨j⟩ or ⟨g⟩. Many speakers pronounce ⟨dsch⟩ as [t͡ʃ] (= ⟨tsch⟩), because [dʒ] is not native to German. |
| dt | | [t] | It is used in the word Stadt, in morpheme bounds (e.g. beredt, verwandt), and in some proper names. |
| f | | [f] | |
| g | otherwise | [ɡ] or [ɡ̊] | [ʒ] before ⟨e, i⟩ in loanwords from French (as in Genie) |
| g | syllable final | [k] | |
| g | when part of word-final -⟨ig⟩ | [ç] or [k] (Southern Germany) | |
| h | before a vowel | [h] | |
| h | when lengthening a vowel | silent | |
| j | | [j] | [ʒ] in loanwords from French, e.g. Journalist [ʒʊʁnaˈlɪst], from French journaliste. |
| k | | [k] | |
| l | | [l] | |
| m | | [m] | |
| n | | [n] | |
| ng | usually | [ŋ] | |
| ng | Across morpheme boundaries | [nɡ] or [nɡ̊] | |
| nk | | [ŋk] | |
| p | | [p] | |
| pf | | [pf] | For some speakers [f] morpheme initially. |
| ph | | [f] | Used in words of Ancient Greek origin. |
| qu | | [kv] or [kw] (in a few regions) | |
| r | Standard German | [ʁ] before vowels, [ɐ] in other cases | e.g. Fahrt [faːɐt]. r is always used to note down this allophone without distinguishing the vowel or consonant. |
| r | (Austro-Bavarian) | [r ~ ɾ] before vowels, [ɐ] otherwise | |
| r | (Swiss Standard German) | [r] in all cases | |
| rh | | same as r | Used in words of Ancient Greek origin and in some proper names. |
| s | before vowel (except after obstruents) | [z] or [z̥] | |
| s | before consonants, after obstruents, or when final | [s] | |
| s | before ⟨p, t⟩ at the beginning of a word or syllable | [ʃ] | |
| sch | otherwise | [ʃ] | |
| sch | when part of the -chen diminutive of a word ending on ⟨s⟩, (e.g. Mäuschen "little mouse") | [sç] | |
| ss | | [s] | |
| ß | | [s] | |
| t | | [t] | Silent at the end of loanwords from French (although spelling may be otherwise Germanized: Debüt, Eklat, Kuvert, Porträt) |
| th | | [t] | Used in words of Ancient Greek origin and in some proper names. |
| ti | otherwise | [ti] | |
| ti | in -⟨tion, tia, tial, tiar, tiär, tie, tiell, tient, tiös, tium⟩ | [tsɪ̯] | Used in words of Latin origin. |
| tsch | | [tʃ] | |
| tz | | [ts] | follows short vowels |
| tzsch | | [tʃ] | Used in some proper names. |
| v | otherwise | [f] | |
| v | in foreign borrowings not at the end of a word | [v] | |
| w | | [v] | |
| x | | [ks] | |
| y | | [j] | Only in some loanwords, e. g. Yeti /ˈjeːti/, otherwise look at chart below |
| z | | [ts] | |
| zsch | | [tʃ] | Used in some proper names. |

=== Vowels ===
Monophthongs
| | front | | | | central | | back | |
| | unrounded | | rounded | | central | | back | |
| | short | long | short | long | short | long | short | long |
|---|---|---|---|---|---|---|---|---|
| close | ([i]) | [iː] ⟨i, ie, ih, ieh⟩ | ([y]) | [yː] ⟨ü, üh, y⟩ | | | ([u]) | [uː] ⟨u, uh⟩ |
| near-close | [ɪ] ⟨i⟩ | | [ʏ] ⟨ü, y⟩ | | | | [ʊ] ⟨u⟩ | |
| close-mid | ([e]) | [eː] ⟨e, eh, ee⟩ | ([ø]) | [øː] ⟨ö, öh⟩ | | | ([o]) | [oː] ⟨o, oh, oo⟩ |
| open-mid | [ɛ] ⟨ä, e⟩ | [ɛː] ⟨ä, äh⟩ | [œ] ⟨ö⟩ | | [ə] ⟨e⟩ | | [ɔ] ⟨o⟩ | |
| near-open | | | | | [ɐ] -⟨er⟩ | | | |
| open | | | | | [a] ⟨a⟩ | [aː] ⟨a, ah, aa⟩ | | |

Diphthongs
| | front | | back |
| | unrounded | rounded | back |
|---|---|---|---|
| close | | [ɔj] ⟨eu, äu⟩ | |
| open | [aɪ] ⟨ei, ai⟩ | | [aʊ] ⟨au⟩ |

==== Short vowels ====
Consonants are often doubled in writing to indicate the preceding vowel is to be pronounced as a short vowel, mostly when the vowel is stressed. Only consonants written by single letters can be doubled; compare Wasser 'water' to waschen 'wash', not *waschschen. Hence, short and long vowels before the digraph ⟨ch⟩ are not distinguished in writing: Drache /ˈdʁaxə/ 'dragon', Sprache /ˈʃpʁaːxə/ 'language'.

Most one-syllable words that end in a single consonant are pronounced with long vowels, but there are some exceptions such as an, das, es, in, mit, and von. The suffixes -in, -nis and the word endings -as, -is, -os, -us contain short unstressed vowels, but duplicate the final consonants in the plurals: Leserin 'female reader' — Leserinnen 'female readers', Kürbis 'pumpkin' — Kürbisse 'pumpkins'.

- ⟨a⟩: [a] as in Wasser 'water'
- ⟨ä⟩: [ɛ] as in Männer 'men'
- ⟨e⟩: [ɛ] as in Bett 'bed';
- ⟨i⟩: [ɪ] as in Mittel 'medium'
- ⟨o⟩: [ɔ] as in kommen 'to come'
- ⟨ö⟩: [œ] as in Göttin 'goddess'
- ⟨u⟩: [ʊ] as in Mutter 'mother'
- ⟨ü⟩: [ʏ] as in Müller 'miller'
- ⟨y⟩: [ʏ] as in Dystrophie 'dystrophy'

==== Unstressed short vowels ====
The ⟨e⟩ in the ending -en is often silent, as in bitten 'to ask, request'. The ending -er is often pronounced [ɐ], but in some regions, it is [ʀ̩] or [r̩]. The ⟨e⟩ in the endings -el ([əl~l̩], e.g. Tunnel, Mörtel 'mortar') and -em ([əm~m̩] in the dative case of adjectives, e.g. kleinem from klein 'small') is pronounced as a schwa.

- ⟨e⟩: [ə] as in Ochse 'ox' or mute, making the following sound syllabic as in bitten [ˈbɪtn̩] 'to ask, request';
- ⟨er⟩ [ɐ] or [ɛɐ̯], as in Wasser 'water', [ə] in Österreich 'Austria' and derivatives

==== Long vowels ====
In the following cases, the vowel letter always represents a long vowel:

- being the final letter (except for ⟨e⟩)
- in the stressed open syllable as in Wagen "car"
- doubled as in Boot "boat"
- followed by silent letter ⟨h⟩ as in Weh "pain", gehen "go"

Also, the vowel letter usually represents a long vowel:

- being only followed by a single consonant as in bot "offered", which is continuously valid in the compound words including Botschaft "embassy".

The German definite article is pronounced with long vowels in the forms der, dem, den, die, but with short vowels in the forms das and des.

A vowel before two or more different consonants is usually pronounced short, but there are some words where it is pronounced long, e.g. Mond "moon".

Long vowels are generally pronounced with greater tenseness than short vowels.

The long vowels map as follows:

- ⟨a, ah, aa⟩: [aː] as in Bahn 'railway'
- ⟨ä, äh⟩: [ɛː] or [eː] as in regelmäßig 'regularly'
- ⟨e, eh, ee⟩: [eː] as in Meer 'sea'
- ⟨i, ih⟩: [iː] as in wir 'we'
- ⟨ie, ieh⟩: [iː] as in riesig 'huge'
- ⟨o, oh, oo⟩: [oː] as in Sohn 'son'
- ⟨ö, öh⟩: [øː] as in Österreich 'Austria'
- ⟨u, uh⟩: [uː] as in Kuh 'cow'
- ⟨ü, üh⟩: [yː] as in über 'above/about'
- ⟨y⟩: [yː] (chiefly foreign, very rare) as in psychisch 'psychical'

==== Diphthongs ====
- ⟨au⟩: [aʊ] as in laut 'loud'
- ⟨eu, äu⟩: [ɔʏ] as in Deutschland 'Germany'
- ⟨ei, ai, ey, ay⟩: [aɪ] as in Seite 'side'

==== Shortened long vowels ====
A pre-stress long vowel shortens, mostly in the unstressed position:

- ⟨i⟩: [i]
- ⟨y⟩: [y]
- ⟨u⟩: [u]
- ⟨e⟩: [e]
- ⟨ö⟩: [ø]
- ⟨o⟩: [o]

A vowel bearing secondary stress may also shorten, as in Monolog 'monologue' [ˌmonoˈloːk]. Phonemically, they are typically analysed as allophones of the long /iː, yː, uː, eː, øː, oː/ (thus /ˌmoːnoːˈloːk/ etc.) and are mostly restricted to loanwords.

==== Unusual spellings in proper names ====
In some German proper names, unusual spellings occur, e. g. ⟨ui⟩ [yː]: Duisburg /dyːsbʊʁk/; ⟨ow⟩ [oː]: Treptow /ˈtʁeːptoː/.

== Punctuation ==
The period (full stop) is used at the end of sentences, for abbreviations, for ordinal numbers (such as der 1. for der erste 'the first'), and to denote calendar dates (such as 05.10.2026 for 'October 5, 2026'). It is omitted before a full stop at the end of a sentence. The period is used for digit separation except in Switzerland and can be used for all numbers except denoting years. In Switzerland, the period is used as the decimal separator for currency values.

The comma is used between for enumerations (but the serial comma is not used), before adversative conjunctions, after vocative phrases, for clarifying words such as appositions, before and after infinitive and participle constructions, and between clauses in a sentence. A comma may link two independent clauses without a conjunction. The comma is not used before direct speech; in this case, the colon is used. Using the comma in infinitive phrases was optional before 2024, when the revision of the orthographic rules made it mandatory. The comma is used as the decimal separator for numbers.

The exclamation mark and the question mark are used for exclamative and interrogative sentences. It is not preceded by a space, in contrast with languages like French. The exclamation mark may be used for addressing people in letters.

The semicolon is used for divisions of a sentence greater than that with the comma.

The colon is used before direct speech and quotes, after a generalizing word before enumerations (but not when the words das ist, das heißt, nämlich, zum Beispiel are inserted), before explanations and generalizations, and after words in questionnaires, timetables, etc. (e.g. Vater: Franz Müller).

The en dash (–) is used for marking a sharp transition from one thought to another one, between commands, for contrasting, for marking unexpected changes, for marking an unfinished direct speech, and sometimes instead of parentheses in parenthetical constructions. There, spaces are used if the connecting words are complete. Outside of prose, it can be used to represent bis 'to' between inclusive endpoints except when von 'from' is used; in this use, spaces are optional when the connected concepts have no spaces in them.

The em dash (―) is used between remarks of a dialogue (as a quotation dash), between keywords in a review, in table entries to indicate intentional absence.

The ellipsis is used for unfinished thoughts and, inside square brackets, for omissions in citations.

The parentheses are used for parenthetical information.

The square brackets are used instead of parentheses inside parentheses and for editor's words inside quotations.

The quotation marks are written as „…“ or, in literature, »…«. They are used for direct speech, quotes, names of books, periodicals, films, etc., and for words in unusual meaning. Quotation inside a quotation is written in single quotation marks: ‚…‘ (or ›…‹ whenever »…« is used). If a quotation is followed by a period or a comma, it is placed outside the quotation marks. Swiss German uses «…» (and ‹…›) quotation marks.

The apostrophe is used for contracted forms (such as ’s for es) except forms with omitted final ⟨e⟩ (was sometimes used in this case in the past) and preposition+article contractions. It is also used for genitive of proper names ending in ⟨s, ß, x, z, ce⟩, but not if preceded by the definite article. It is used as the digit separator in Switzerland.

== History of German orthography ==
=== Middle Ages ===
The oldest known German texts date back to the 8th century. They were written mainly in monasteries in different local dialects of Old High German. In these texts, ⟨z⟩ along with combinations such as ⟨tz, cz, zz, sz, zs⟩ was chosen to transcribe the sounds /ts/ and /s(ː)/, which is ultimately the origin of the modern German letters ⟨z, tz⟩ and ⟨ß⟩ (an old ⟨sz⟩ ligature). After the Carolingian Renaissance, however, during the reigns of the Ottonian and Salian dynasties in the 10th century and 11th century, German was rarely written, the literary language being almost exclusively Latin.

Notker the German is a notable exception in his period: not only are his German compositions of high stylistic value, but his orthography is also the first to follow a strictly coherent system.

Significant production of German texts only resumed during the reign of the Hohenstaufen dynasty (in the High Middle Ages). Around the year 1200, there was a tendency towards a standardized Middle High German language and spelling for the first time, based on the Franconian-Swabian language of the Hohenstaufen court. However, that language was used only in the epic poetry and minnesang lyric of the knight culture. These early tendencies of standardization ceased in the interregnum after the death of the last Hohenstaufen king in 1254. Certain features of today's German orthography still date back to Middle High German: the use of the trigraph ⟨sch⟩ for /ʃ/ and the occasional use of ⟨v⟩ for /f/ because around the 12th and 13th century, the prevocalic /f/ was voiced.

In the following centuries, the only variety that showed a marked tendency to be used across regions was the Middle Low German of the Hanseatic League, based on the variety of Lübeck and used in many areas of northern Germany and indeed northern Europe in general.

=== Early modern period ===
By the 16th century, a new interregional standard developed on the basis of the East Central German and Austro-Bavarian varieties. This was influenced by several factors:

- Under the Habsburg dynasty, there was a strong tendency to a common language in the chancellery.
- Since Eastern Central Germany had been colonized only during the High and Late Middle Ages in the course of the Ostsiedlung by people from different regions of Germany, the varieties spoken were compromises of different dialects.
- Eastern Central Germany was culturally very important, being home to the universities of Erfurt and Leipzig and especially with the Luther Bible translation, which was considered exemplary.
- The invention of printing led to an increased production of books, and the printers were interested in using a common language to sell their books in an area as wide as possible.

Mid-16th century Counter-Reformation reintroduced Catholicism to Austria and Bavaria, prompting a rejection of the Lutheran language. Instead, a specific southern interregional language was used, based on the language of the Habsburg chancellery.

In northern Germany, the Lutheran East Central German replaced the Low German written language until the mid-17th century. In the early 18th century, the Lutheran standard was also introduced in the southern states and countries, Austria, Bavaria and Switzerland, due to the influence of northern German writers, grammarians such as Johann Christoph Gottsched or language cultivation societies such as the Fruitbearing Society.

=== 19th century and early 20th century ===
19th century German alphabet

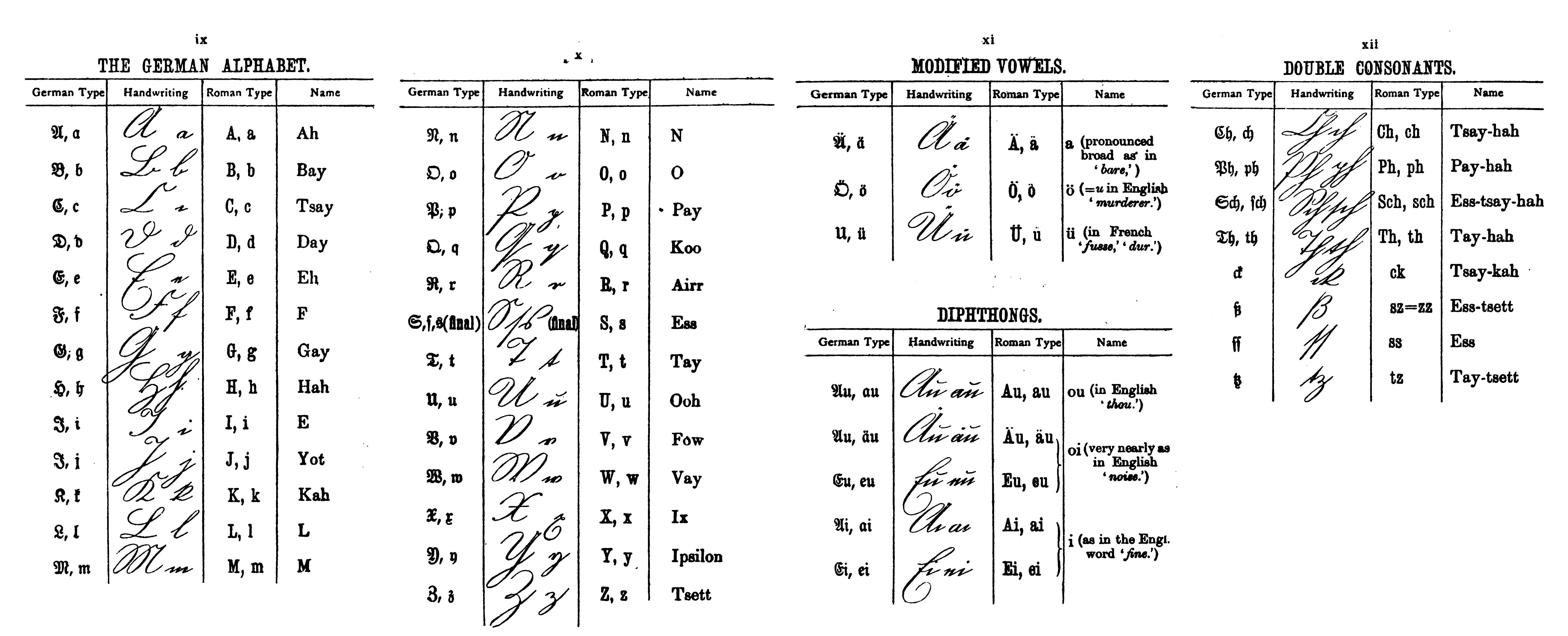
(Becker, 1896)

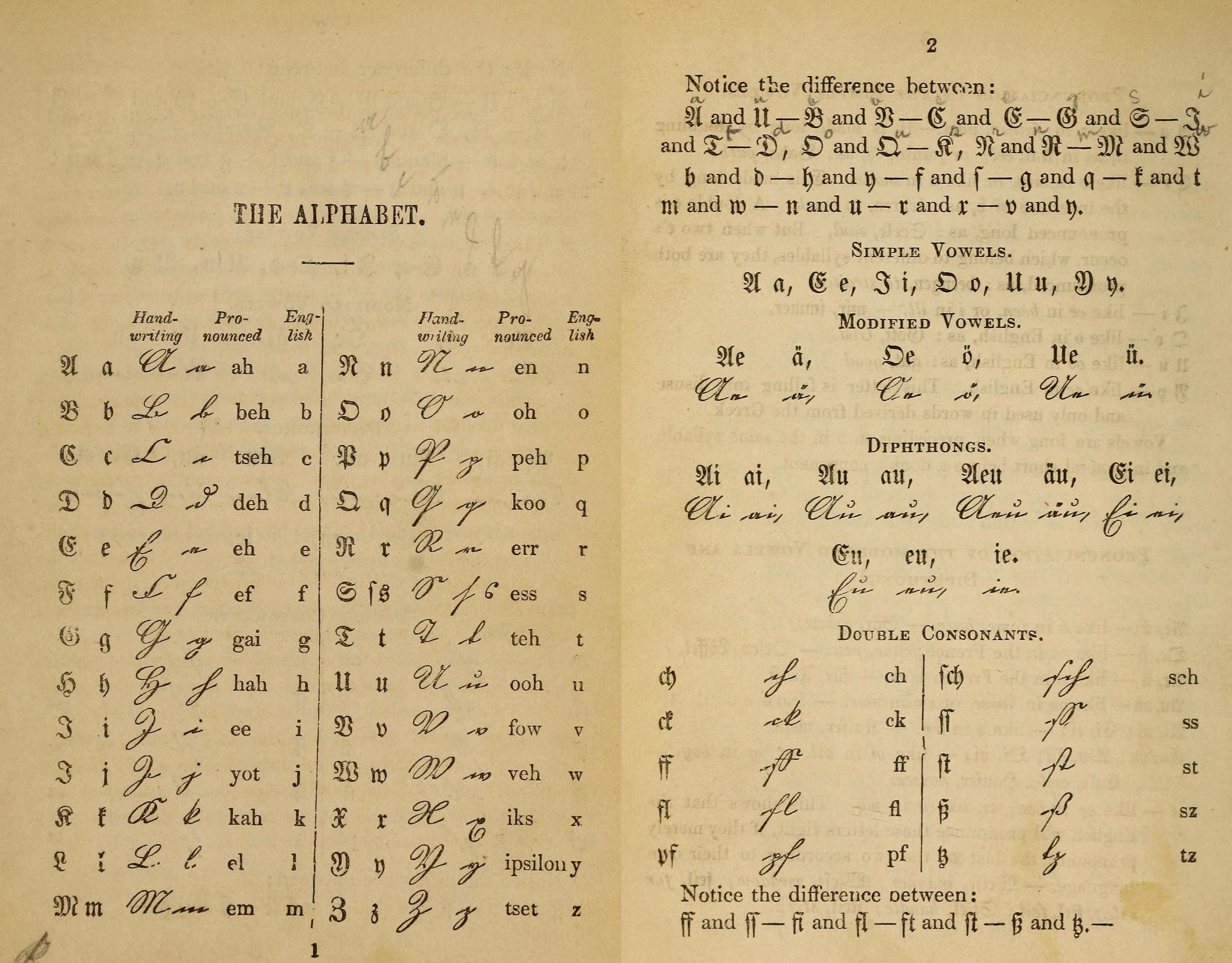
(Falck-Lebahn, 1851)

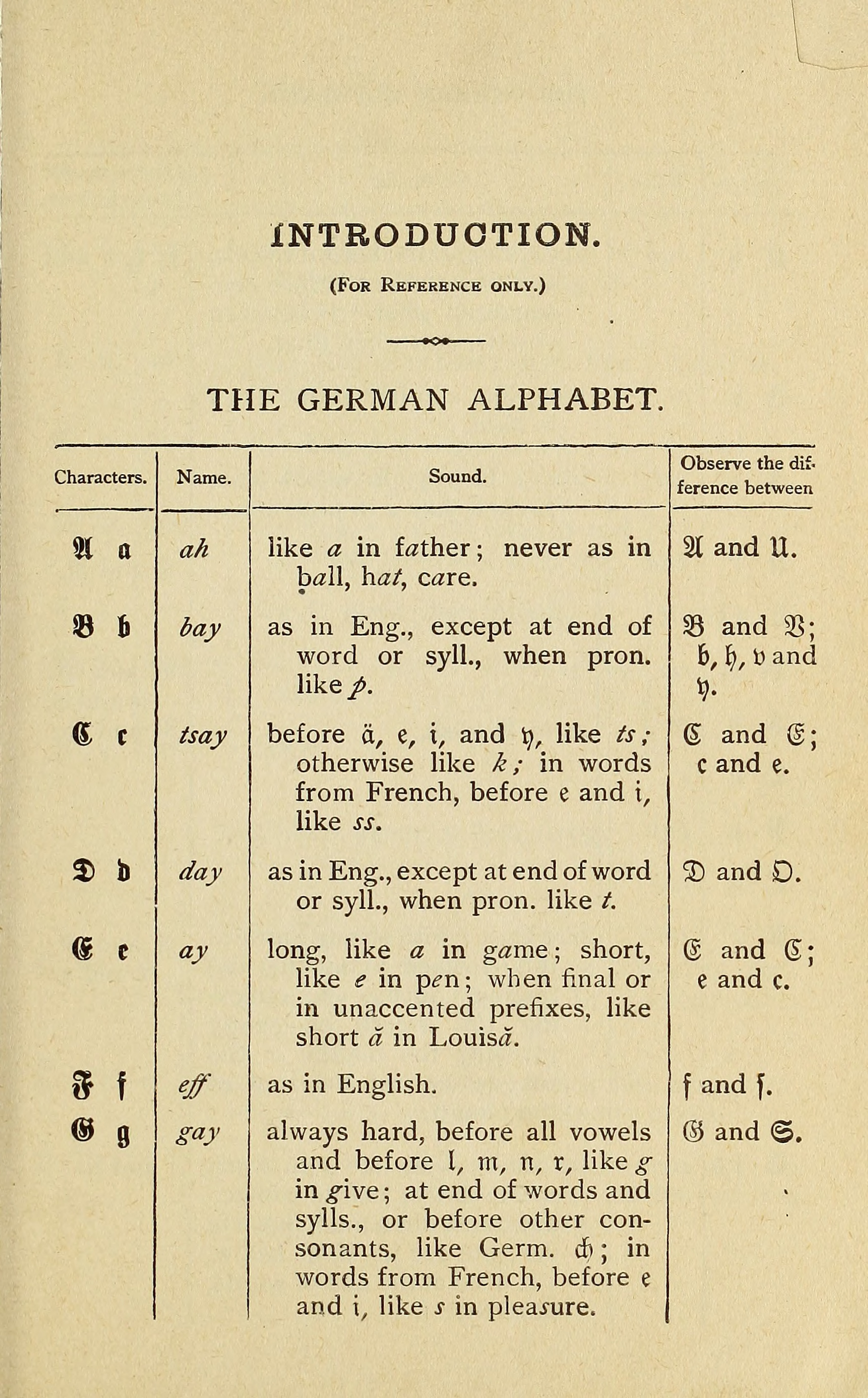
(Smissen-Fraser, 1900)

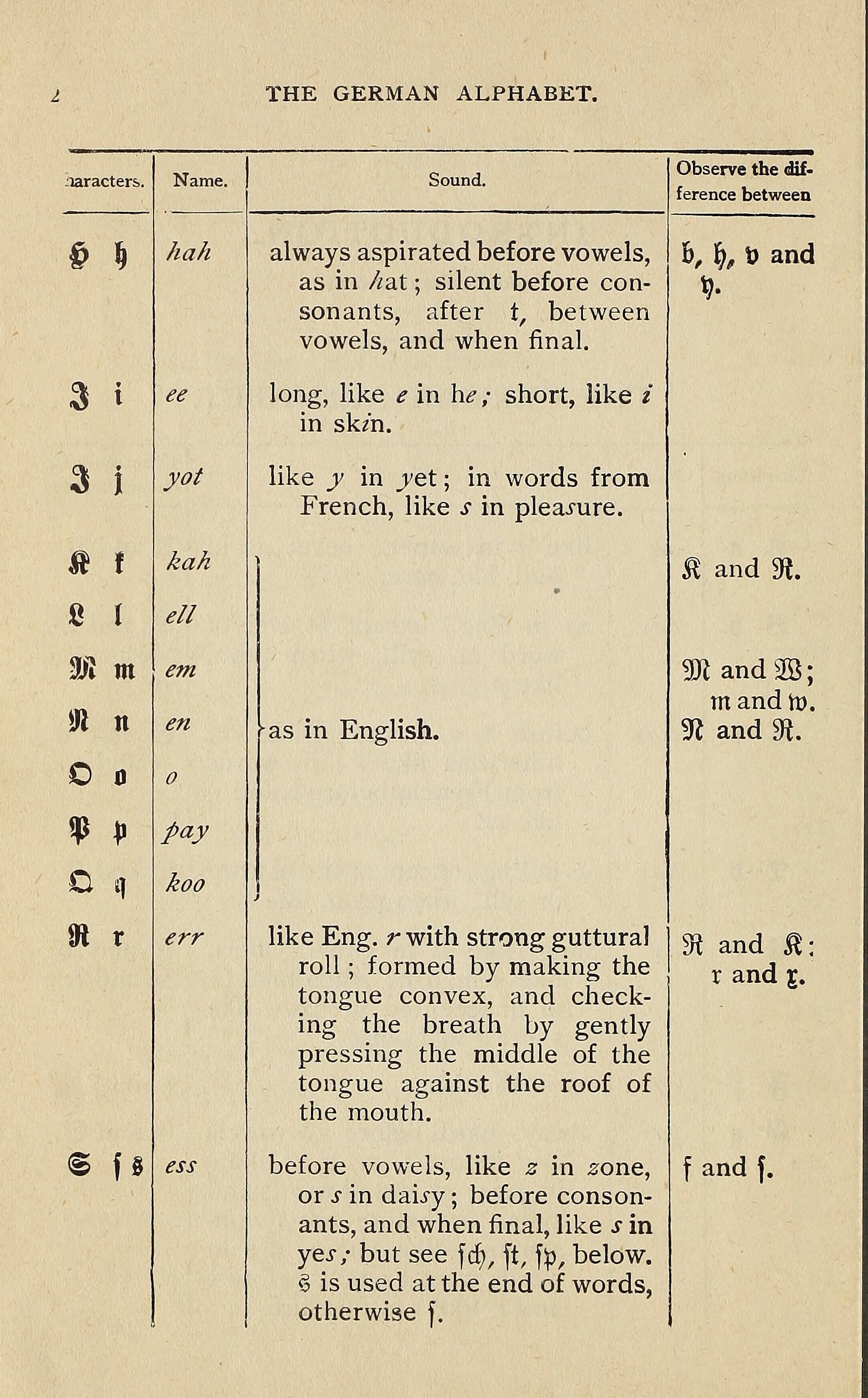
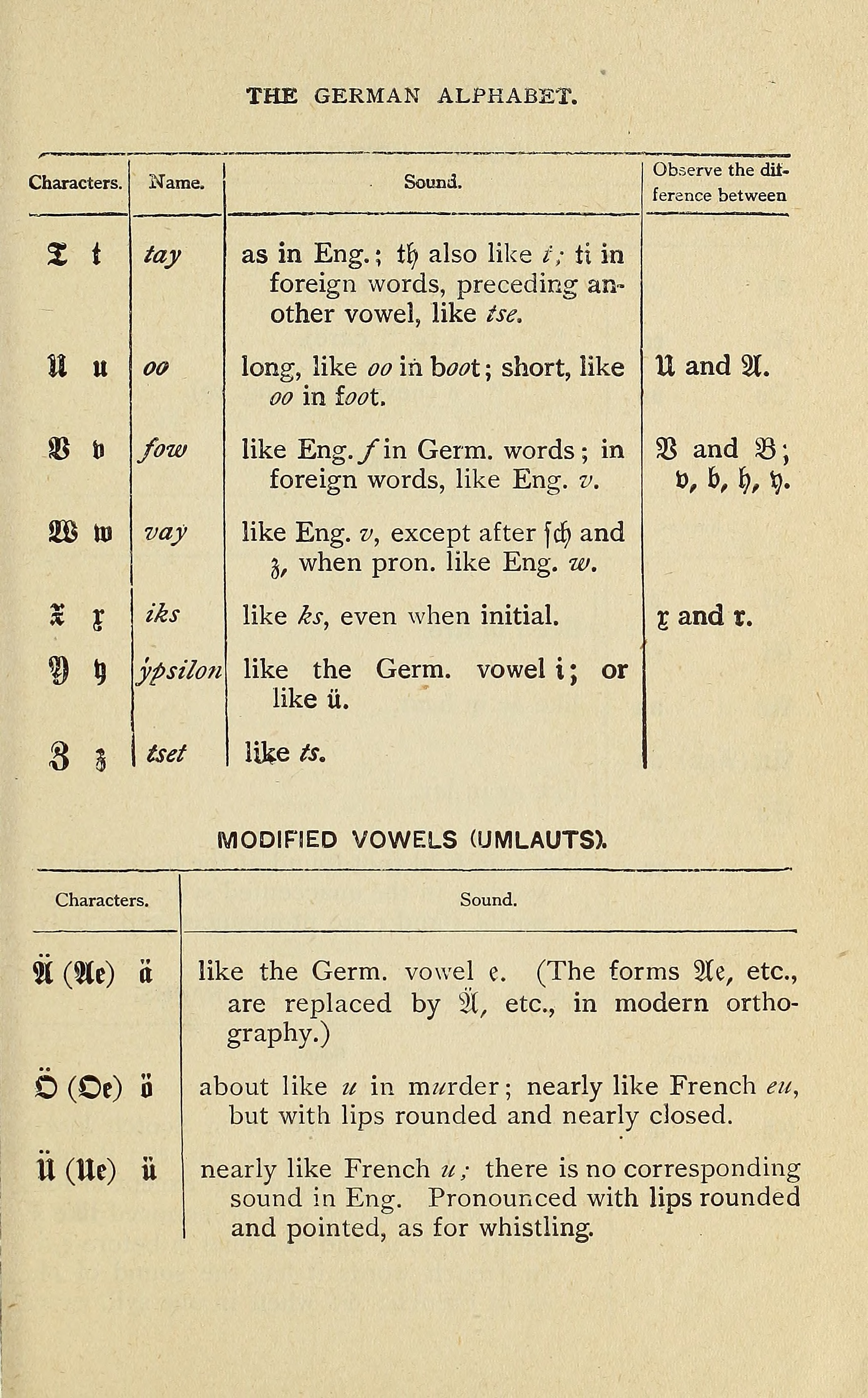
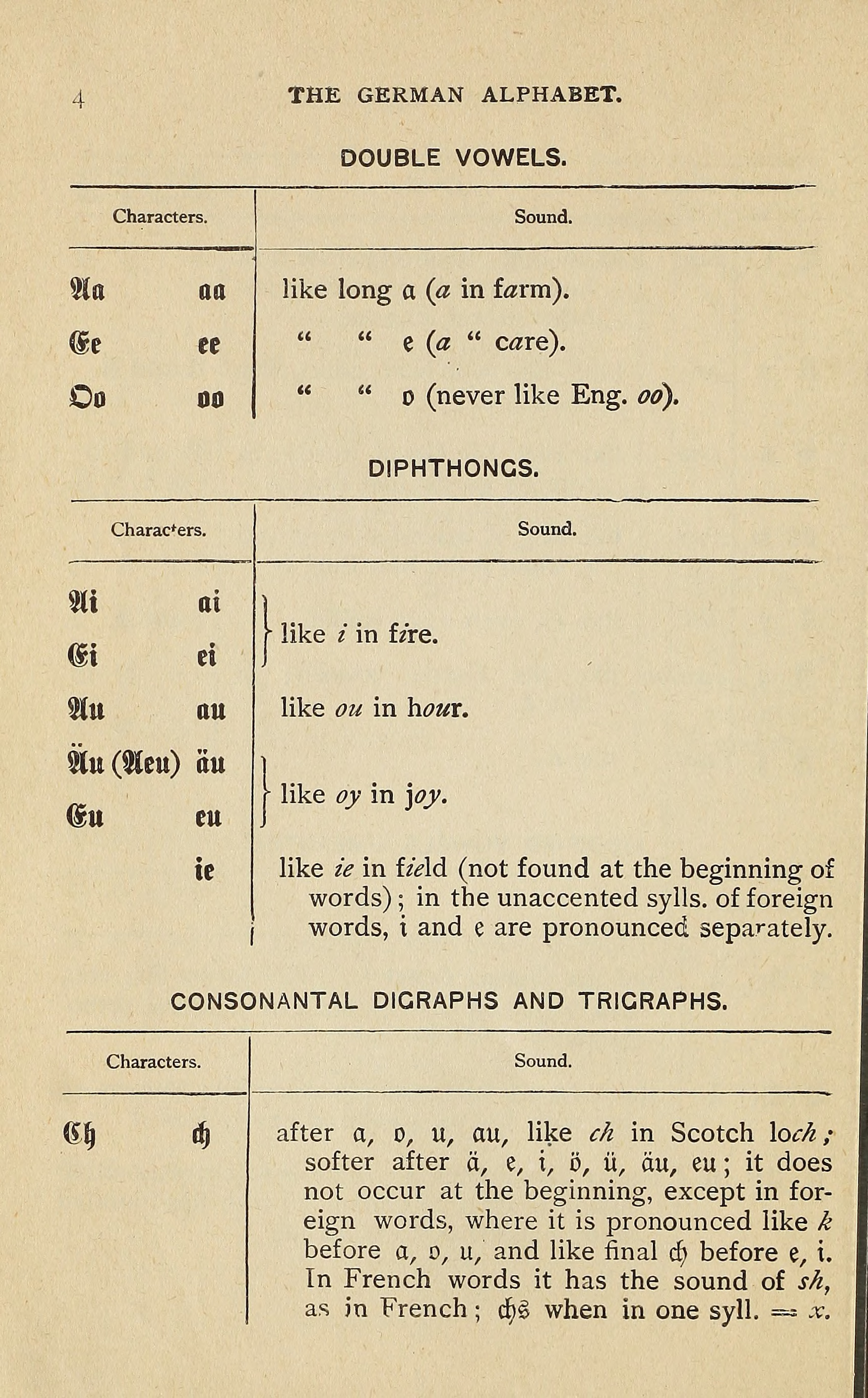
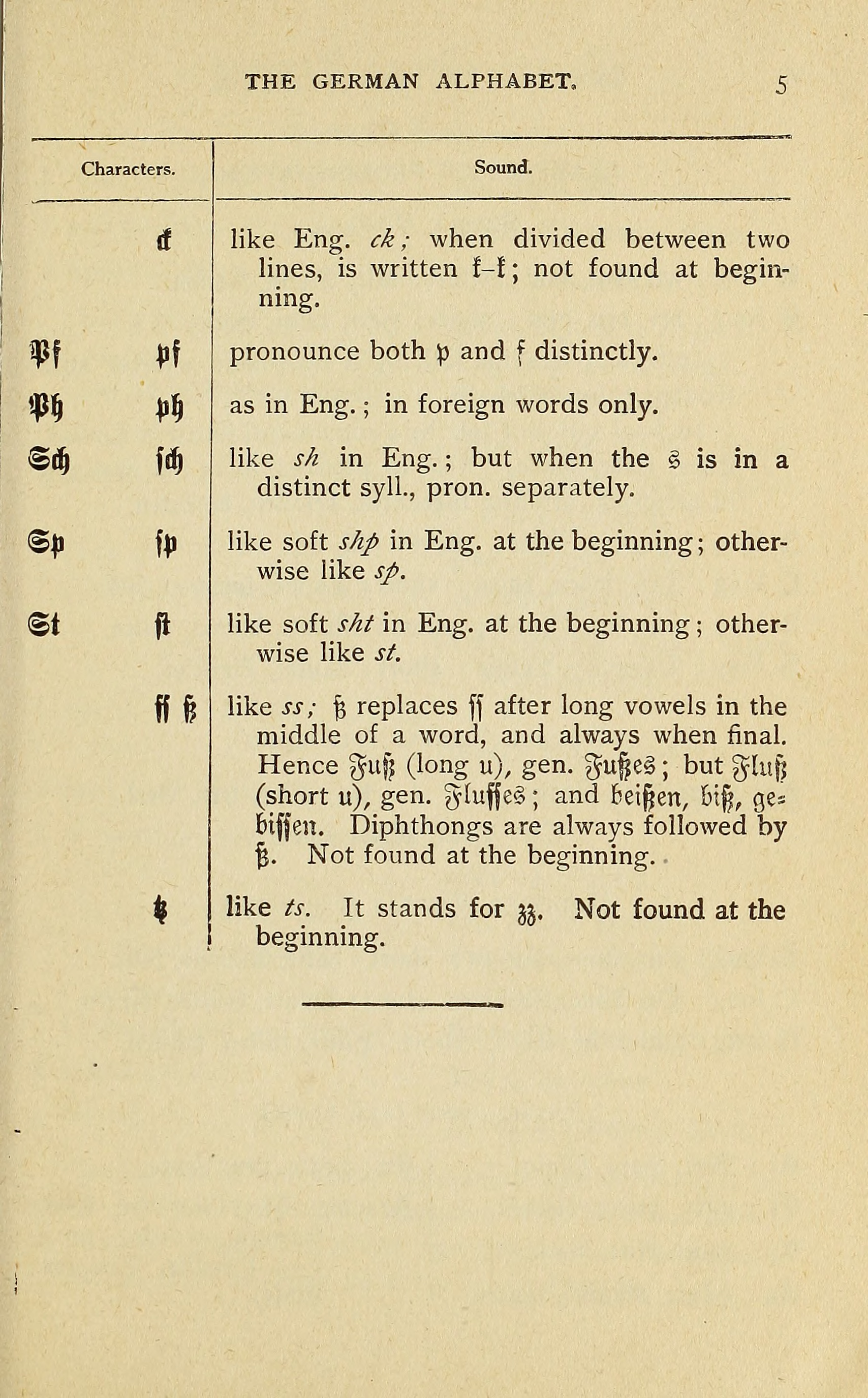
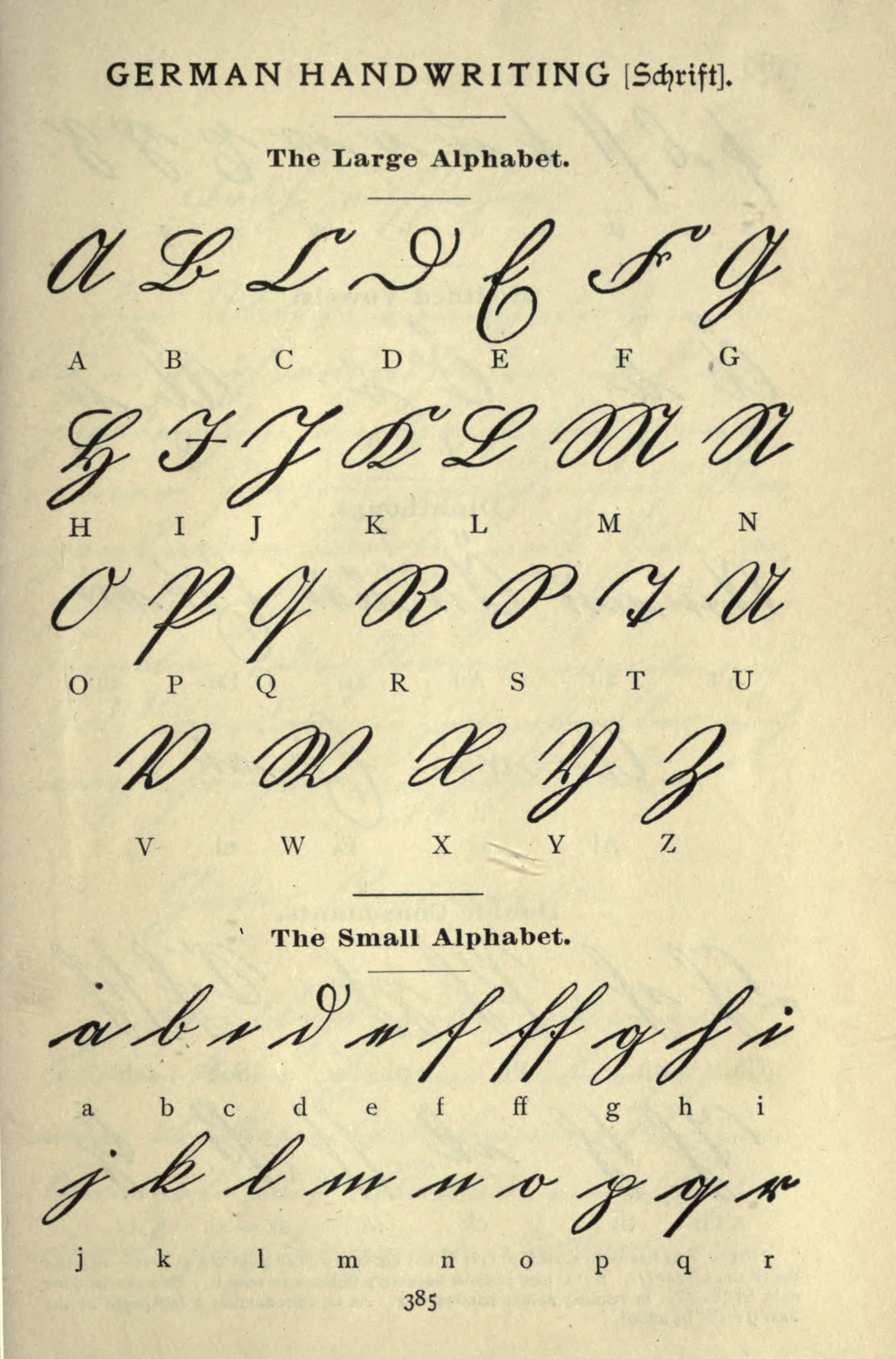
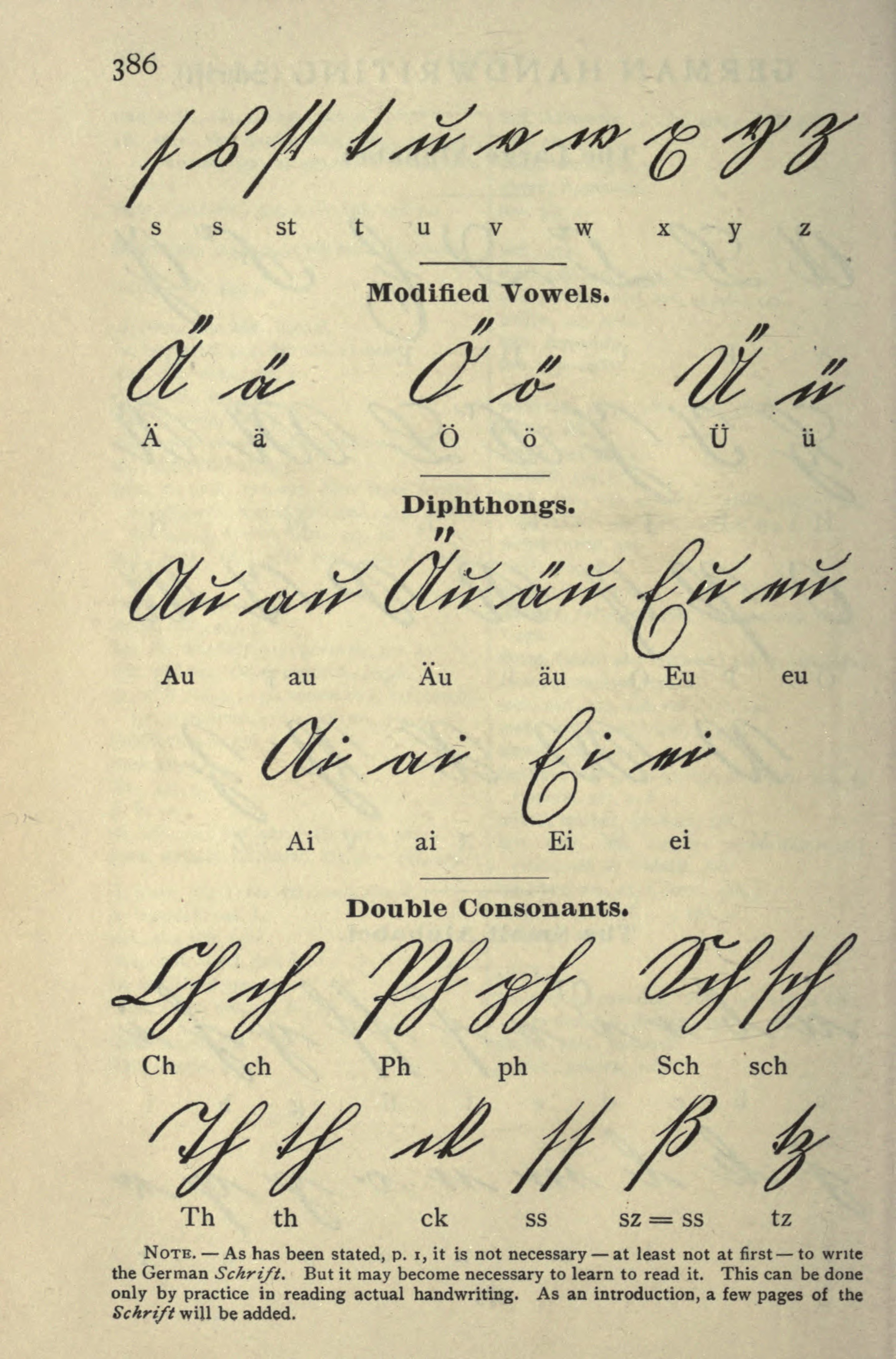

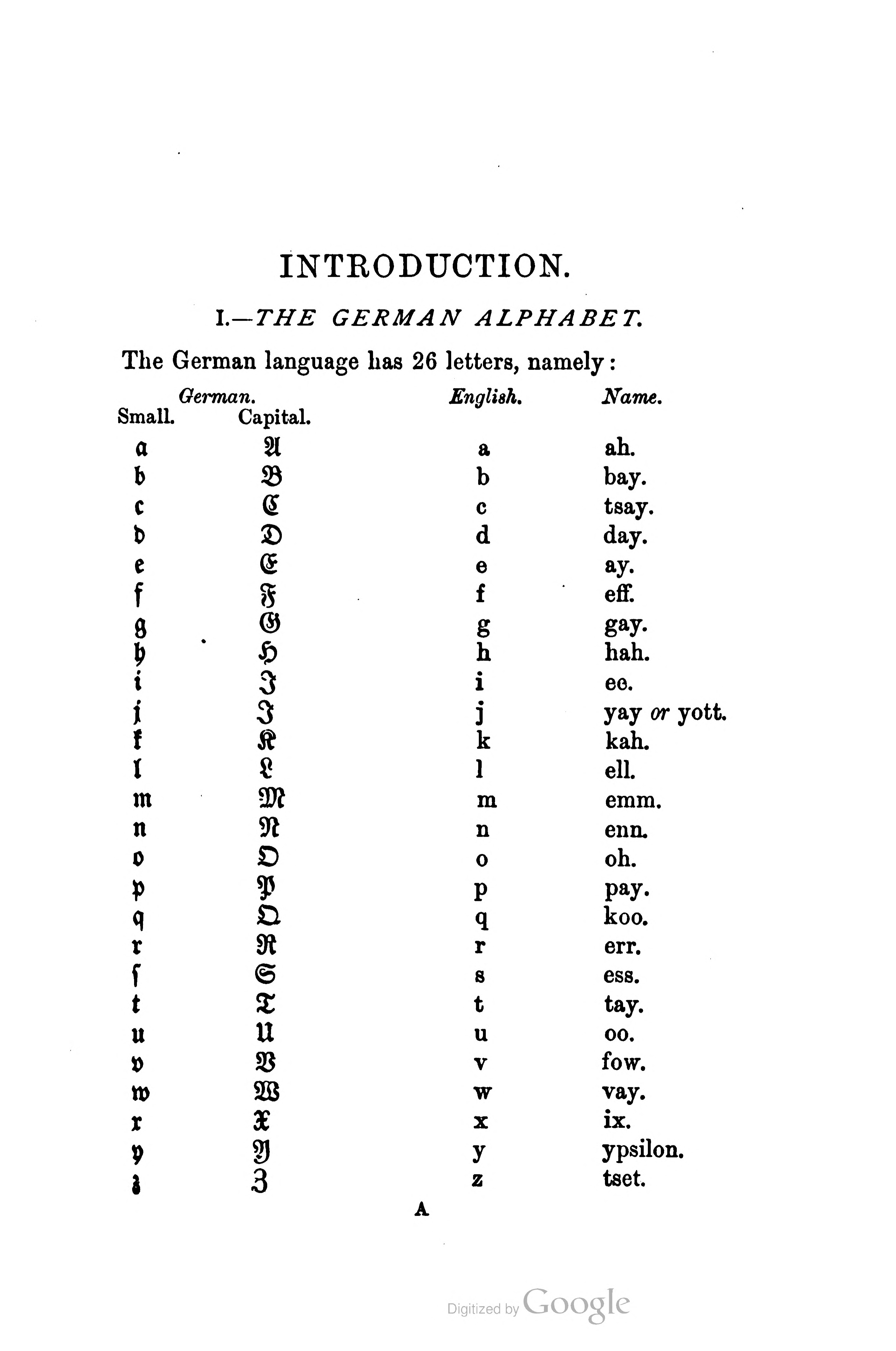
(Schlomka, 1885)

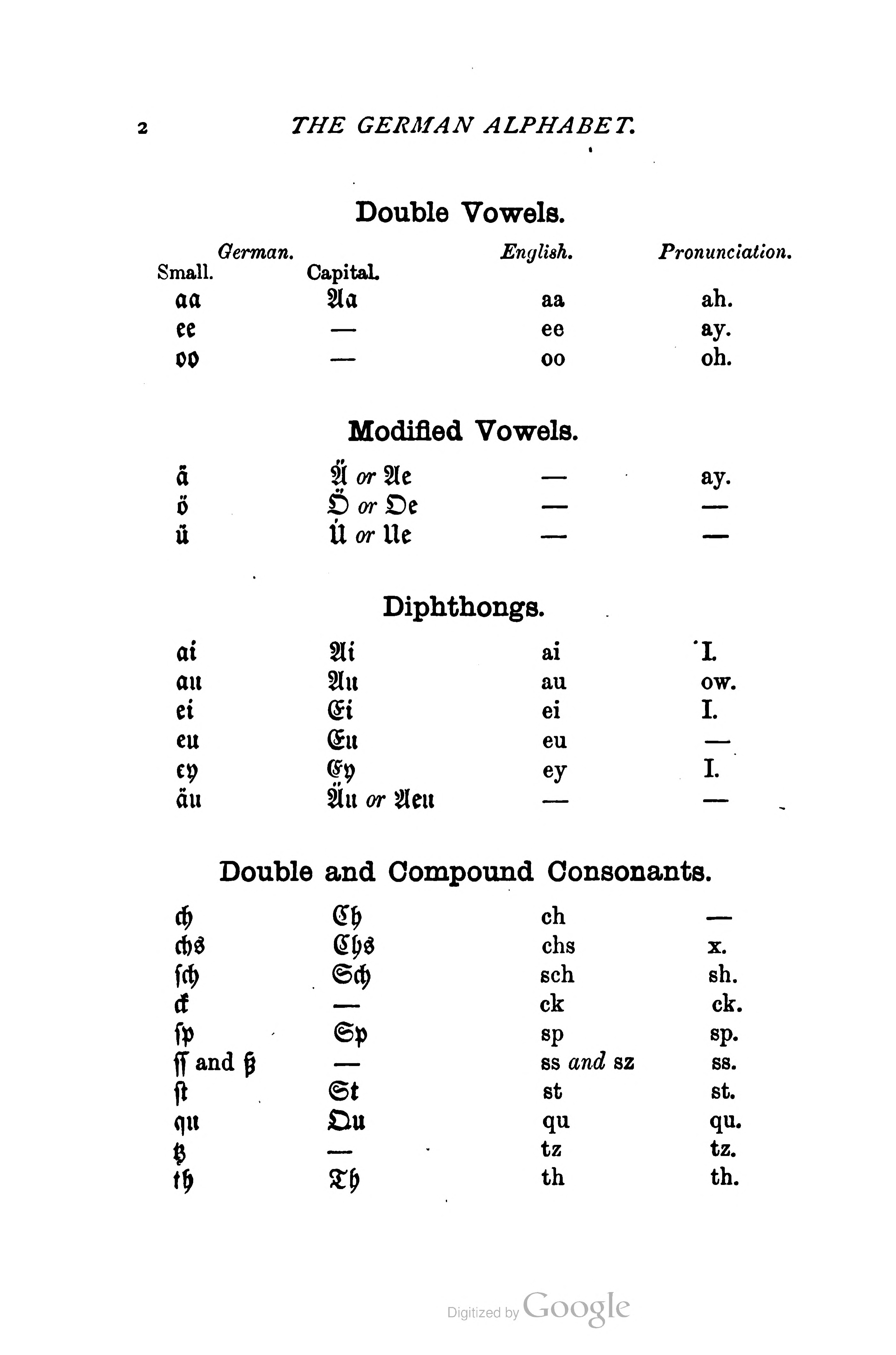

Though, by the mid-18th century, one norm was generally established, there was no institutionalized standardization. Only with the introduction of compulsory education in late 18th and early 19th century was the spelling further standardized, though at first independently in each state because of the political fragmentation of Germany. Only the foundation of the German Empire in 1871 allowed for further standardization.

In 1876, the Prussian government instituted the First Orthographic Conference to achieve a standardization for the entire German Empire. However, its results were rejected, notably by Prime Minister of Prussia Otto von Bismarck.

In 1880, Gymnasium director Konrad Duden published the Vollständiges Orthographisches Wörterbuch der deutschen Sprache ('Complete Orthographic Dictionary of the German Language'), known simply as the "Duden". In the same year, the Duden was declared to be authoritative in Prussia. Since Prussia was, by far, the largest state in the German Empire, its regulations also influenced spelling elsewhere, for instance, in 1894, when Switzerland recognized the Duden.

In 1901, the interior minister of the German Empire instituted the Second Orthographic Conference. It declared the Duden to be authoritative, with a few innovations. In 1902, its results were approved by the governments of the German Empire, Austria and Switzerland.

In 1944, the Nazi German government planned a reform of the orthography, but because of World War II, it was never implemented. However, they successfully abolished Fraktur script and enforced the general use of Antiqua.

After 1902, German spelling was essentially decided de facto by the editors of the Duden dictionaries. After World War II, this tradition was followed with two different centers: Mannheim in West Germany and Leipzig in East Germany. By the early 1950s, a few other publishing houses had begun to attack the Duden monopoly in the West by putting out their own dictionaries, which did not always hold to the "official" spellings prescribed by Duden. In response, the Ministers of Culture of the federal states in West Germany officially declared the Duden spellings to be binding as of November 1955.

The Duden editors used their power cautiously because they considered their primary task to be the documentation of usage, not the creation of rules. At the same time, however, they found themselves forced to make finer and finer distinctions in the production of German spelling rules, and each new print run introduced a few reformed spellings.

=== German spelling reform of 1996 ===
German spelling and punctuation was changed in 1996 (Reform der deutschen Rechtschreibung von 1996) with the intent to simplify German orthography, and thus to make the language easier to learn, without substantially changing the rules familiar to users of the language. The rules of the new spelling concern correspondence between sounds and written letters (including rules for spelling loan words), capitalization, joined and separate words, hyphenated spellings, punctuation, and hyphenation at the end of a line. Place names and family names were excluded from the reform.

The reform was adopted initially by Germany, Austria, Liechtenstein and Switzerland, and later by Luxembourg as well.

The new orthography is mandatory only in schools. A 1998 decision of the Federal Constitutional Court of Germany confirmed that there is no law on the spelling people use in daily life, so they can use the old or the new spelling. While the reform is not very popular in opinion polls, it has been adopted by all major dictionaries and the majority of publishing houses.

== See also ==
- Antiqua-Fraktur dispute
- Binnen-I, a convention for gender-neutral language in German
- Dutch orthography
- English orthography
- German braille
- German phonology
- Non-English usage of quotation marks
- Otto Basler
- Spelling
- Punctuation
- Silent letter#German
