= German Orthographic Conference of 1901 =

German conference

The German Orthographic Conference of 1901 (the Berlin II Orthographic Conference; German: Zweite Orthographische Konferenz or II. Orthographische Konferenz) was a conference of orthography that took place in Berlin 17–19 June 1901. The results of the conference became official in the German Empire in 1902. The standardized German spelling that resulted from the conference was largely based on the Prussian school spelling, but also on the Orthographic Conference of 1876.

The conference results removed numerous existing variant forms. Soon after the conference, its results were criticized by people who believed there should be further changes.

The spelling was used in Germany, Austria and Switzerland, apart from the replacement of ß with ss in Switzerland in later years. The Erziehungsrat des Kantons Zürich stopped the teaching of ß in schools in 1935 with the Canton of Zürich being the first to do so, and the Neue Zürcher Zeitung was the last Swiss newspaper to stop using ß, in 1974. However, some Swiss book publishers still use ß.

95 years later the German spelling was changed again with the German orthography reform of 1996.

== Encoding ==
The IETF language tags include de-1901 for "Traditional German orthography".

== See also ==
- German orthography reform of 1944
- German orthography reform of 1996
