= Council for German Orthography =

Main international body regulating German orthography

Legal statuses of German in Europe: "German Sprachraum": German is (co-)official language and first language of the majority of the population. German is a co-official language, but not the first language of the majority of the population. German (or a German dialect) is a legally recognised minority language. (Squares: Geographic distribution too dispersed/small for map scale) German (or a variety of German) is spoken by a sizeable minority, but has no legal recognition.

The Rat für deutsche Rechtschreibung (German pronunciation: [ˈʁaːt fyːɐ̯ ˈdɔʏtʃə ˈʁɛçtˌʃʁaɪbʊŋ], "Council for German Orthography" or "Council for German Spelling"), or RdR, is the main international body regulating Standard High German orthography.

With its seat being in Mannheim, Germany, the RdR was formed in 2004 as a successor to the Zwischenstaatliche Kommission für deutsche Rechtschreibung ("Intergovernmental Commission for German Orthography") in order to include both supporters and opponents of the German orthography reform of 1996 (and subsequent reforms).

Currently the RdR is composed of 41 members from those states and regions in the German Sprachraum:

- Germany: chairman (no voting right) and 18 councillors
- Austria: 9 councillors
- Switzerland: 9 councillors
- German-speaking Community (Belgium): 1 councillor
- Liechtenstein: 1 councillor
- South Tyrol (Italy): 1 councillor
- Luxembourg: 1 observer (no voting right)

Despite having German as one of its official languages, Luxembourg, which was not involved in devising the reform of 1996, is not a full member of the council. The government of Luxembourg unilaterally adopted the reform. According to the duchy's largest newspaper, the Luxemburger Wort, Luxembourg does not perceive itself as a "German-speaking country" (the only national language is Luxembourgish) and thus had no right to take part in the council. Despite this, Luxembourg takes part in the annual meetings of German-speaking countries. Furthermore, Luxembourg participates in La Francophonie and has members in the Académie française, despite French being only a co-official language, just like German.

The chairman of the Gesellschaft für deutsche Sprache (GfdS) is a member of the council. In 2003, the RdR, the GfdS, the Goethe-Institut and the Institute of the German Language, founded the German Language Council (Deutscher Sprachrat), which was later also joined by the German Academic Exchange Service (DAAD).

== See also ==
- German orthography
