= German orthography reform of 1996 =

German spelling and punctuation reform

The German orthography reform of 1996 (Reform der deutschen Rechtschreibung von 1996) was a change to German spelling and punctuation that was intended to simplify German orthography, thereby making it easier to learn, without substantially changing the rules familiar to users of the language.

The reform was based on an international agreement signed in Vienna in July 1996 by four governments of the German-speaking countries (except Luxembourg) — Germany, Austria, Liechtenstein and Switzerland. Luxembourg did not participate despite having German as one of its three official languages — it regards itself:

as a non-Germanophone country not to be a contributory determinant upon the German system of spelling

though it did eventually adopt the reform.

The reformed orthography became obligatory in schools and in public administration. However, there was a campaign against the reform, and in the resulting public debate the Federal Constitutional Court of Germany was called upon to delineate the extent of reform. In 1998 the court stated that because there was no law governing orthography, outside the school system people could spell as they liked, including the use of traditional spelling. In March 2006, the Council for German Orthography agreed unanimously to remove the most controversial changes from the reform — this was largely, though not completely, accepted by media organizations such as the Frankfurter Allgemeine Zeitung that had previously opposed the reform.

The rules of the new spelling concern the following areas i.e. correspondence between sounds and written letters (this includes rules for spelling loan words), capitalisation, joined and separate words, hyphenated spellings, punctuation, and hyphenation at the end of a line. Place names and family names were excluded from the reform.

== New rules ==
=== Sounds and letters ===
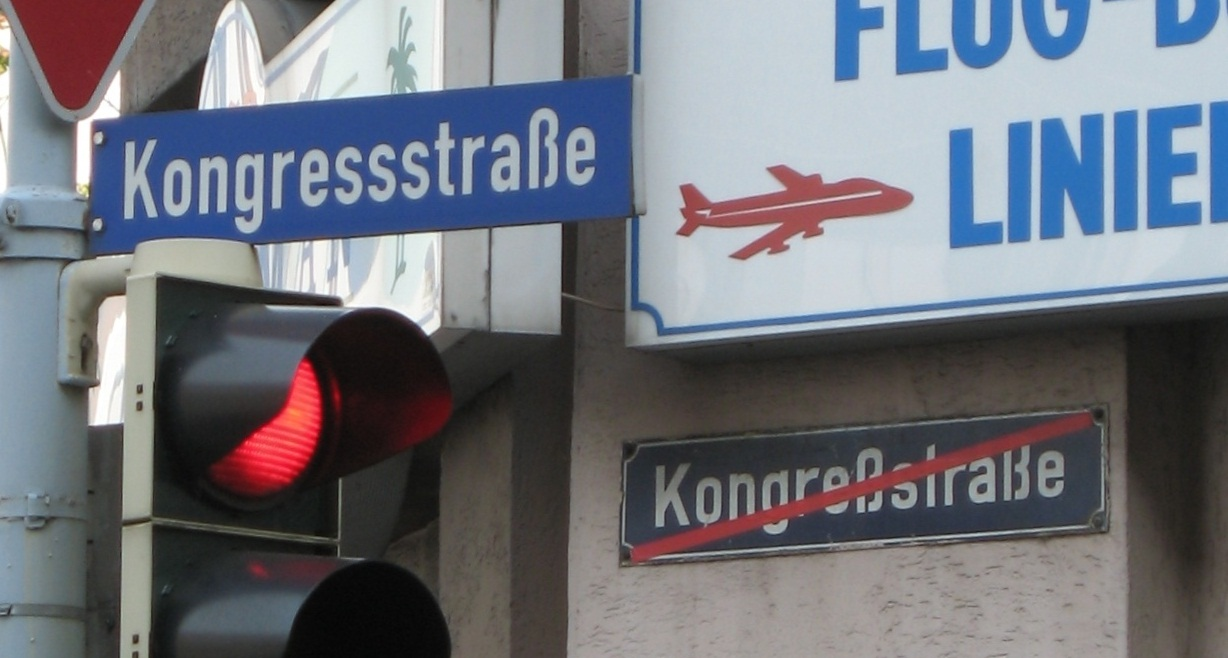
This street sign in Aachen shows a very rare example of a name being changed after the orthography reform of 1996. Spellings in names were, in almost all cases, not changed. Note the old version on the wall.

The word now spelt Flussschifffahrt typeset in Fraktur (therefore containing the long s) as written before the reform, according to the typesetting rules published shortly after the reform, and according to the currently (2011) recommended typesetting rules

The reform aimed to systematise the correspondence between sounds (phonemes) and letters (graphemes), and to strengthen the principle that derived forms should follow the spelling of the root form.

ß and ss: In reformed orthography the grapheme ß (a modernised typographical rendering of how ss appeared in traditional Gothic script; it is seldom used in Switzerland) is considered a separate letter that is to appear only after long vowels and diphthongs. In general in German, long stressed vowels are followed by single consonants, and short stressed vowels by double consonants. In the traditional orthography, ß was written instead of ss if the s phoneme belonged to only one syllable, therefore in terminal position and before consonants ss was always written as ß, without regard to the length of the preceding vowel. In the reformed orthography, a short stressed vowel is never followed by ß. This brings it into line with the two-letter spelling of other final consonants (-ch, -ck, -dt, -ff, -ll, -mm, -nn, -rr, -tt, -tz). Therefore, Fass [fas] – Fässer [ˈfɛsɐ] (previously Faß – Fässer), by analogy to Ball [bal] – Bälle [ˈbɛlə]. This contrasts with Maß [maːs] – Maße [ˈmaːsə], analogous to Tal [taːl] – Täler [ˈtɛːlɐ].

Nevertheless, the new German spelling is not fully phonemic, and it is still necessary to know the plural of a noun in order to spell its singular correctly: Los [loːs] – Lose [ˈloːzə], Floß [floːs] – Flöße [ˈfløːsə] (it is however morphophonemic; cf. the usage of voiced versus voiceless plosives at word end).

Exempted from change are certain very common short-vowelled words which end in a single 's' (such as das, es), echoing other undoubled final consonants in German (e.g. ab, im, an, hat, -ig). So the frequent error of confusing the conjunction dass (previously daß) and the relative pronoun das has remained a trap: Ich hoffe, dass sie kommt. (I hope that she comes.) Das Haus, das dort steht. (The house that stands there.) Both are pronounced [das].

The so-called s rule makes up over 90% of the words changed by the reform. Since a trailing -ss does not occur in the traditional orthography (which uses -ß instead), the -ss at the end of reformed words like dass and muss (previously muß) is now the only quick and sure sign to indicate that the reformed spelling has been used, even if just partly, in texts (except those of Swiss origin). All other changes are encountered less frequently and not in every text.

Triple consonants preceding a vowel are no longer reduced (but hyphenation is often used in these instances anyway):

- Schiffahrt became Schifffahrt from Schiff (ship) + Fahrt (journey)

In particular, triple "s" now appears more often than all the other triple consonants together, while in the traditional orthography they never appear.

- Flußschiffahrt → Flussschifffahrt
- Mißstand → Missstand

Doubled consonants appear after short vowels at the end of certain words, to conform with derived forms:

- As → Ass because of plural Asse (ace, aces)
- Stop → Stopp because of the verb stoppen

Vowel changes, especially ä for e, are made to conform with derived forms or related words.

- Stengel → Stängel (stalk) because of Stange (pole)

Additional minor changes aim to remove a number of special cases or to allow alternative spellings

- rauh → rau (rough) for consistency with blau, grau, genau

Several loan words now allow spellings that are closer to the "German norm". In particular, the affixes -phon, phot-, and -graph can be spelled with f or ph.

=== Capitalisation ===
Capitalisation after a colon is now obligatory only if a full sentence or direct speech follows; otherwise a lower-case letter must go after a colon.

The polite capitalisation of the formal second-person pronouns (Sie, Ihnen, and Ihr) was retained. The original 1996 reform also provided that the familiar second-person pronouns (du, dich, dir, dein, ihr, euch, and euer) should not be capitalised, even in letters, but this was amended in the 2006 revision to permit their optional capitalisation in letters.

The reform aimed to make the capitalisation of nouns uniform and clarify the criteria for this. In the original 1996 reform, this included the capitalisation of some nouns in compound verbs where the nouns had largely lost their capitalisation when becoming a part of the compound verb, for instance changing eislaufen to Eis laufen ("ice running" = to ice-skate) and kopfstehen to Kopf stehen (to stand on one's head). However, this was reversed in the 2006 revision, restoring verbs like eislaufen and kopfstehen.

=== Compound words ===
As before, compound nouns are generally joined into one word, but several other compounds are now separated.

Nouns and verbs are generally separated (but see above):

- radfahren → Rad fahren (to ride a bicycle)

Multiple infinitive verbs used with finite verbs are separated:

- kennenlernen → kennen lernen (to get to know)
- spazierengehen → spazieren gehen (to go for a walk)

Other constructions now admit alternative forms:

- an Stelle von or anstelle von (instead of)

There are some subtle changes in the meaning when the new forms collide with some pre-existing forms:

- vielversprechend → viel versprechend (literally "much promising", but the meaning of the long compound adjective is "promising" in the sense of "up-and-coming", "auspicious"; whereas the second phrase with two words means "promising many things")

== Exceptions ==
- Family names are completely excluded from the rules and are not affected by the reform; this also applies to given names.
- Place names are not strictly subject to the rules. The German Ständiger Ausschuss für geographische Namen (Permanent Committee for Geographic Names) strongly recommends applying the rules for new names, but stresses that this applies only when new names are assigned or the responsible authorities decide to modify existing names.

== History ==
=== Debate over the need for reform ===
Spelling reform had been discussed for a long time and was still controversial in the late 1960s.

=== Institutionalised reform talks since 1980 ===
In 1980, the Internationaler Arbeitskreis für Orthographie (International Working Group for Orthography) was formed, with linguists from East Germany, West Germany, Austria, and Switzerland taking part.

The initial proposals of this working group were further discussed at two conferences in Vienna, Austria, in 1986 and 1990, to which the Austrian government had invited representatives from every region where German is spoken. In the closing remarks from the first of these meetings, capitalisation reform was put off to a future "second phase" of German language reform attempts, since no consensus had been reached.

In 1987, the ministers of education of the federal states (Bundesländer) in West Germany assigned the Leibniz Institute for the German Language in Mannheim, Germany, and the Society for the German Language in Wiesbaden, Germany, with the task of coming up with a new system of rules. In 1988, these two organisations presented an incomplete but very wide-ranging set of proposed new rules, for example, the phrase Der Kaiser ißt den Aal im Boot ("The Emperor eats the eel in the boat") would be written Der keiser isst den al im bot. However, these proposals were quickly rejected by the general public, and then they were withdrawn by the ministers of education as unacceptable. At the same time, similar groups were formed in Switzerland, Austria, and East Germany.

In 1992, the International Working Group published a proposed global reform to German spelling entitled Deutsche Rechtschreibung – Vorschläge zu ihrer Neuregelung (German Spelling: Proposals for its New Regulation). In 1993, the German ministers of education invited 43 groups to present their opinions on the document, with hearings held in the unified Germany, Austria, and Switzerland. On the basis of these hearings, the working group backed off from the notion of eliminating the capitalisation of all nouns. It also preserved the orthographical distinction between the inconvenient homophones das ("the", or "that", relative pronoun) and daß ("that", conjunction, as in "She said that you came"), which introduce different types of subordinate clause.

At a third conference in Vienna in 1994, the results were recommended to the respective governments for acceptance. The German ministers of education decided to implement the new rules on 1 August 1998, with a transitional period lasting until the 2004–2005 school year.

=== Institution of the reform ===
On 1 July 1996, all the German states (Bundesländer), and the countries of Austria, Switzerland, and Liechtenstein, as well as some other countries with German-speaking minorities (but notably not Luxembourg) agreed to introduce the new spelling by 1 August 1998. A few German Bundesländer introduced the new rules starting from the 1996–97 school year.

=== Public debate after the signing of the declaration of intent ===
The reforms did not attract much attention from the general public until after the international declaration of intent was signed. Animated arguments arose about the correctness of the decision, with schoolteachers being the first to be faced with the implementation of the new rules. At the Frankfurt Book Fair (the largest in Germany) in 1996, Friedrich Denk, a teacher from Bavaria, obtained signatures from hundreds of authors and scientists demanding the cancellation of the reform. Among the leading opponents were Günter Grass, Siegfried Lenz, Martin Walser, Hans Magnus Enzensberger, and Walter Kempowski. The protest gained further nationwide significance through initiatives such as Wir Lehrer gegen die Rechtschreibreform (We Teachers Against the Spelling Reform), which was headed by the teacher and activist Manfred Riebe.

In May 1997, the "Society for German Spelling and Language Cultivation – initiative against the spelling reform" (Verein für deutsche Rechtschreibung und Sprachpflege e.V. (VRS) – Initiative gegen die Rechtschreibreform) was founded in opposition to the German spelling reform.

The issue was taken up in the courts, with different decisions in different German states, so that the Federal Constitutional Court of Germany was called upon to make a ruling. In May 1998, a group of 550 language and literature professors, led by Theodor Ickler, Helmut Jochems, Horst Haider Munske and Peter Eisenberg, two of the reformers, Harald Weinrich of the Collège de France, Jean-Marie Zemb of the Académie des Sciences Morales et Politiques, and others, in a resolution requested the reversal of the reform by the Federal Constitutional Court of Germany.

On 14 July 1998, after one hearing on 12 May 1998, and involving only one teachers' organisation, the Federal Constitutional Court declared that the introduction of the spelling reform by the ministers of education was lawful.

In the German state of Schleswig-Holstein, a majority of voters in a referendum on 27 September 1998 called for a return to traditional spellings. However, the minister-president of the state, Heide Simonis, found a way to reverse the results of the referendum via a parliamentary vote in 1999.

While the new German dictionaries were published in July and August 1996, the critics of the language reform perceived themselves to be justified. They began to demand the reversal of the change at federal level. However, the ministers of education steadfastly refused to accede to their demands. The editors of the Duden dictionaries also agreed that many of the problems in the traditional spelling system were due to the "arcane rules" that had been fabricated to explain the system, thereby lending their support to the new spelling system, which they said was (and is) more logical.

One of the public critics of the spelling reform was Josef Kraus, president of the Deutscher Lehrerverband (German Association of Teachers).

=== Later developments ===
In 1997, an international committee was formed to handle any cases of doubt that might arise under the new rules. In 2004, the German federal minister of education and research, Edelgard Bulmahn, announced that this committee was to be given wide-ranging powers to make decisions about German spelling. Only in cases of extreme changes, such as the proposed capitalisation change, would the committee require the consent of the states' ministers of education. This move was strongly criticised.

Simultaneously, the committee released its fourth report on spelling reforms, reviewing the points of the reform in detail. However, this report was rejected by the Conference of Ministers of Education in March 2004. The ministers also demanded that the committee work together with the German Academy for Language and Poetry in its future deliberations. The academy had been strongly critical of the reform from the beginning. The ministers also made changes to the composition of the international committee.

In July 2004, the ministers decided to introduce some changes to the reform, making both the traditional and the new spellings acceptable. They also formed a Council for German Orthography, "38 experts from five countries", representing linguists, publishers, writers, journalists, teachers and parents. Taking the place of the existing international committee, the Council agreed unanimously to implement the uncontroversial parts of the reform, while allowing compromises on other changes: "writing compounds separately or as a single word, [on] the use of lower and upper case, punctuation and syllabification". This modified reform came into effect by 1 August 2006.

In July 2024, the revised official German orthography rules were approved by the competent authorities in Germany, Austria, Switzerland, Belgium, Liechtenstein and South Tyrol. The revision included a redesigned official word list and changes to punctuation rules, including mandatory commas in expanded infinitive constructions.

== Legal status ==
The spelling change is based on the international agreement of 1 July 1996, signed on behalf of Germany, Austria, and Switzerland. The signatories for Germany were the president of the Conference of Ministers of Education, Karl-Heinz Reck, and the parliamentary secretary of the Federal Ministry of the Interior, Eduard Lintner. There have been no Bundestag (parliamentary) decisions on the reforms. Instead, as mentioned above, the German Supreme Court ruled that the reform at state schools could be decided by the ministers of education. Therefore, with effect from 1 August 2005, the traditional spelling system was to be considered incorrect by the schools, except that two of the German states, Bavaria and North Rhine-Westphalia, had both officially rejected the reform. Since 2006, the new rules have become compulsory in Bavarian and North Rhine-Westphalian state schools as well. It is presumed that from the schools the writing reforms will spread to the German-speaking public.

== State of implementation ==
As of 2004, most German printed media used spelling rules that to a large extent comply with the reforms. These included most newspapers and periodicals, and the German press agencies Deutsche Presse Agentur (DPA) and Reuters. Still, some newspapers, including Die Zeit, the Neue Zürcher Zeitung, the Frankfurter Allgemeine Zeitung, and the Süddeutsche Zeitung, created their own in-house orthography rules, while most other newspapers used approximately the rules set out by the DPA. These in-house orthographies therefore occupy a continuum between "old spelling with new rules for ß" and an (almost) full acceptance of the new rules.

School books and children's books generally follow the new spellings, while the text of novels is presented as the authors prefer. Classic works of literature are typically printed without any changes, unless they are editions specifically intended for use in schools.

Since dictionaries adopted the new spellings early on, there is no currently in-print, standard reference work available for traditional spellings. However, Theodor Ickler, a Professor of German at the University of Erlangen, has produced a new dictionary that aims to meet the demands of simplification without the need to impose any new spellings. It has not been reprinted since 2004. The commerce in used copies of the older Duden dictionaries has dwindled. As of the 2004 edition, the Duden dictionary includes the most recent changes proposed by the ministers of education.

The IETF language tags registered de-1996 in 2005 for text following the reform.

== Acceptance of the reform ==
=== In Switzerland and Liechtenstein ===
In Switzerland and Liechtenstein, the reform had a less noticeable effect, as the letter "ß", which was a prominent part of the reform, was not in use anyway.

== See also ==
- Binnen-I, a convention for gender-neutral language in German
- Gender star, a convention for gender-neutral language in German
- German orthography
- German Orthographic Conference of 1901
- German orthography reform of 1944
- Language planning
- Spelling reform
- ß

== Bibliography ==
- German dictionary plus grammar. [German spelling reform incorporated; the complete two-in-one reference]. 2nd edition. Glasgow: Harper Collins, 1999, 1151 S., ISBN 0-00-472358-9
- Jan Henrik Holst: German politicians' decision on 30 March 2006: Nazi orthography becomes obligatory in German schools! If children spell German the usual way, they will get "mistakes". Strong protest necessary! Hamburg, 6 October 2006. Download
- Sally A. Johnson: Spelling trouble? Language, ideology and the reform of German orthography. Clevedon, UK: Multilingual Matters, LTD, 2005, 208 p., ISBN 1-85359-785-6
- Diethelm Prowe: Review of Sally Johnson, Spelling Trouble? Language, Ideology and the Reform of German Orthography. In: H-German, H-Net Reviews, November 2005. online
- Elke Philburn: Rechtschreibreform still spells controversy. In: Debatte. Review of Contemporary German Affairs, Bd. 11. No. 1, 2003, S. 60–69.

=== German titles ===
Due to the nature of the topic, most books and papers regarding the German spelling reform appeared in the German language. The following list includes authors who are responsible for the definition of the imposed changes.

- Gerhard Augst; Karl Blüml; Dieter Nerius; Horst Sitta (Hrsg.): Zur Neuregelung der deutschen Orthographie. Begründung und Kritik. Tübingen: Niemeyer, 1997, VI, 495 S., ISBN 3-484-31179-7
- Hanno Birken-Bertsch; Reinhard Markner: Rechtschreibreform und Nationalsozialismus. (= Reform of German orthography and National Socialism). Ein Kapitel aus der politischen Geschichte der deutschen Sprache. [Eine Veröffentlichung der Deutschen Akademie für Sprache und Dichtung]. Göttingen: Wallstein-Verlag, 2000, 134 S., ISBN 3-89244-450-1 – Note: This book includes a comparison with the German spelling reform of Nazi Germany or Drittes Reich ("Third Reich") of 1944. Anmerkung: Dies Buch enthält einen Vergleich mit der Reform der deutschen Rechtschreibung von 1944 – online
- Hanno Birken-Bertsch und Reinhard Markner: Sprachführer. Über den Sonderweg der deutschen Rechtschreibreformer. In: Junge Welt vom 3. April 2001 – online
- Friedrich Denk: Frankfurter Erklärung zur Rechtschreibreform. In: Frankfurter Allgemeine Zeitung vom 19. Oktober 1996 – online
- Friedrich Denk: Kein Schlußstrich. In: Frankfurter Allgemeine Zeitung Nr. 293 vom 16. Dezember 2006, S. 18 – online
- Wolfgang Denk: 10 Jahre Rechtschreibreform. Überlegungen zu einer Kosten-Nutzen-Analyse. Masterarbeit im Fachbereich 09 Wirtschaftsingenieurwesen der Fachhochschule München. München, 5. September 2006, 172 Seiten – PDF Download
- Matthias Dräger: Rechtschreibreform: Matthias Dräger über den Volksentscheid in Schleswig-Holstein. "Ein Sprung in die Jauchegrube". Interview von Thorsten Thaler. In: Junge Freiheit, Nr. 40 vom 25. September 1998, S. 3 – online
- Peter Eisenberg: Das Versagen orthographischer Regeln. Über den Umgang mit dem Kuckucksei. In: Hans-Werner Eroms; Horst Haider Munske (Hrsg): Die Rechtschreibreform. Pro und Kontra. Berlin: Erich Schmidt Verlag, 1997, 264 S., ISBN 3-503-03786-1, S. 47–50
- Peter Eisenberg (Hrsg.): Niemand hat das letzte Wort. Sprache, Schrift, Orthographie. Göttingen: Wallstein, 2006, 121 S., ISBN 978-3-8353-0059-0 (Valerio 3/2006, Publikation der Deutschen Akademie für Sprache und Dichtung) – online
- Hans-Werner Eroms; Horst Haider Munske (Hrsg): Die Rechtschreibreform. Pro und Kontra. Berlin: Erich Schmidt Verlag, 1997, 264 S., ISBN 3-503-03786-1
- Frankfurter Allgemeine Zeitung für Deutschland (Hrsg.): Die Reform als Diktat. Zur Auseinandersetzung über die deutsche Rechtschreibung. Frankfurter Allgemeine Zeitung, Frankfurt am Main, Oktober 2000, 119 S.
- Peter Gallmann, Horst Sitta: Die Neuregelung der deutschen Rechtschreibung. Regeln, Kommentar und Verzeichnis wichtiger Neuschreibungen. Mannheim / Leipzig / Wien / Zürich: Dudenverlag, 1996, 316 S. (= Dudentaschenbuch, Band 26)
- Peter Gallmann, Horst Sitta: Handbuch Rechtschreiben. 4. Auflage. Zürich: Lehrmittelverlag des Kantons Zürich, 1998, 216 Seiten, ISBN 3-906718-50-6
- Rolf Gröschner: Zur Verfassungswidrigkeit der Rechtschreibreform. In: Eroms, Hans Werner / Munske, Horst Haider (Hrsg.): Die Rechtschreibreform. Pro und Kontra. Berlin: Erich Schmidt Verlag, 1997, 264 S., ISBN 3-503-03786-1, S. 69–79
- Uwe Grund: Orthographische Regelwerke im Praxistest - Schulische Rechtschreibleistungen vor und nach der Rechtschreibreform, Verlag Frank&Timme, Berlin, 248 Seiten, ISBN 978-3-7329-0279-8
- Jan Henrik Holst: Abschaffung der Rechtschreibreform – eine Chance für die deutsche Sprachgemeinschaft. Hamburg, 6. Oktober 2006 Download
- Theodor Ickler: Die sogenannte Rechtschreibreform. Ein Schildbürgerstreich. 2. Auflage, St. Goar: Leibniz-Verlag, 1997, 206 Seiten, ISBN 3-931155-09-9 (Download PDF, 750 kB)
- Theodor Ickler: Kritischer Kommentar zur "Neuregelung der deutschen Rechtschreibung". Mit einem Anhang zur "Mannheimer Anhörung", 2. durchgesehene und erweiterte Auflage, Erlangen und Jena: Verlag Palm & Enke, 1999 (Erlanger Studien, Band 116), 289 Seiten, ISBN 3-7896-0992-7
- Theodor Ickler: Regelungsgewalt. Hintergründe der Rechtschreibreform, St. Goar: Leibniz, 2001, 312 S., ISBN 3-931155-18-8 (Download PDF, 1,9 MB)
- Theodor Ickler: Normale deutsche Rechtschreibung. Sinnvoll schreiben, trennen, Zeichen setzen, 4. erweiterte Auflage, St. Goar: Leibniz Verlag, 2004, 579 S., ISBN 3-931155-14-5 (Früher u.d.T.: Ickler, Theodor: Deutsche Einheitsorthographie 1999 und: Das Rechtschreibwörterbuch, 2000)
- Theodor Ickler: Rechtschreibreform in der Sackgasse: Neue Dokumente und Kommentare, St. Goar: Leibniz, 2004, 276 S., ISBN 3-931155-22-6 (Download PDF, 1,7 MB)
- Theodor Ickler: Falsch ist richtig. Ein Leitfaden durch die Abgründe der Schlechtschreibreform, München: Droemer, 2006, 271 S., ISBN 978-3-426-27391-3
- Helmut Jochems; Theodor Ickler: Die Rechtschreibreform. Ein Schildbürgerstreich. In: Pädagogische Rundschau, Jg. 51 (1997), Heft 6, S. 764–766
- Helmut Jochems: Die Rechtschreibreform ist seit dem 1.8.1998 amtlich. Was heißt das? Was ist jetzt zu tun? In: Schule in Frankfurt (SchiFF), Nr. 40, November 1998, S. 6–10 – online
- Helmut Jochems: Schlußstrich oder Schlussstrich? Die neue deutsche Rechtschreibung im zweiten Jahr ihrer Erprobungsphase. In: Schule in Frankfurt (SchiFF), Nr. 42, Dezember 1999, S. 9–11 – online
- Wolfgang Kopke: Rechtschreibreform und Verfassungsrecht. Schulrechtliche, persönlichkeitsrechtliche und kulturverfassungsrechtliche Aspekte einer Reform der deutschen Orthographie. Zugleich: Dissertation, Universität Jena, 1995. Tübingen: Mohr, 1995, XII, 452 S., ISBN 3-16-146524-5
- Hans Krieger: Der Rechtschreib-Schwindel. Zwischenrufe zu einem absurden Reformtheater, 1. Auflage, 1998, 152 S., 2. erweiterte Auflage, mit neuen Texten zur aktuellen Entwicklung. St. Goar: Leibniz-Verlag, 2000, 207 S., ISBN 3-931155-11-0 Aufsatzsammlung des Feuilletonchefs der Bayerischen Staatszeitung
- Hans Krieger: "Klar, schlicht und stark" – Sollen wir schreiben wie die Nationalsozialisten? Das verdrängte Vorbild der Rechtschreibreform. In: Süddeutsche Zeitung vom 2. Oktober 2000 ["Clear, simple and powerful" – Shall we write like the National Socialists? The suppressed model of the Reform of German orthography] – online
- Heide Kuhlmann: Orthographie und Politik. Zur Genese eines irrationalen Diskurses. Magisterarbeit. Hannover, 1999 – online
- Christian Meier: "Opfer der Spaßgesellschaft". Christian Meier über die aktuelle Lage im Rechtschreibkampf, den Reform-Widerstand der Deutschen Akademie und die hiesige Lesekultur. Interview von Moritz Schwarz. In: Junge Freiheit Nr. 34, 18. August 2000. S. 3 – online
- Horst Haider Munske: Orthographie als Sprachkultur. Frankfurt am Main; Berlin; Bern; New York; Paris; Wien: Peter-Lang-Verlag, Europäischer Verlag der Wissenschaften, 1997, 336 Seiten, ISBN 3-631-31142-7
- Horst Haider Munske: Neue Rechtschreibwörterbücher im Irrgarten der Rechtschreibreform. Wie soll man selber schreiben und publizieren in diesem Rechtschreibchaos? [Darin: "Alles Rotgedruckte ist falsch! Man vermeide die roten Giftpilze im Duden!"] In: Schule in Frankfurt (SchiFF), Nr. 44, Juni 2001 – online
- Horst Haider Munske: Die angebliche Rechtschreibreform, St. Goar: Leibniz-Verlag, 2005, 163 Seiten, ISBN 3-931155-13-7
- Horst Haider Munske: Lob der Rechtschreibung. Warum wir schreiben, wie wir schreiben. München: Beck, 2005, 141 S., ISBN 3-406-52861-9
- Thomas Paulwitz: Chaos-Regeln. Die Rechtschreibreform ist gescheitert. Gibt es jetzt eine Reform der Reform? In: Junge Freiheit Nr. 11 vom 8. März 2002, S. 2 – online
- Thomas Paulwitz: Der Rechtschreibrat ist gescheitert. Eine Bewertung der neuesten Reform der Rechtschreibreform. In: Deutsche Sprachwelt – Ausgabe 23 vom 20. März 2006, S. 4 – Download PDF
- Stephanus Peil: Die Wörterliste. St. Goar: Leibniz-Verlag, 1997, 28 S., ISBN 3-931155-07-2; 10., überarb. Auflage: Die Wörterliste. Ein Vergleich bisheriger und geplanter Schreibweisen. Westerburg, In den Gärten 5: S. Peil, 1998, 42 S. – online
- Elke Philburn: "New rules chaos" – Die deutsche Rechtschreibreform in Großbritannien. In: Schule in Frankfurt (SchiFF), Nr. 47, November 2003 – online
- Reichs- und Preußisches Ministerium für Wissenschaft, Erziehung und Volksbildung [Hrsg.]: Regeln für die deutsche Rechtschreibung nebst Wörterverzeichnis. Unveränderte Neuauflage von 1940, Berlin: Weidmann, 1941
- Reichsministerium für Wissenschaft, Erziehung und Volksbildung [Hrsg.]: Regeln für die deutsche Rechtschreibung und Wörterverzeichnis. Berlin: Deutscher Schulverlag, 1944
- Manfred Riebe: Die sogenannte deutsche Rechtschreibreform und die Reform der Reform. In: europa dokumentaro Nr. 13. März 2000, S. 10–13 – online
- Manfred Riebe: Unlogisch und verwirrend. Vor einem Jahr wurde in den meisten Medien die neue Rechtschreibung eingeführt. In: Junge Freiheit Nr. 31/32 vom 28. Juli / 4. August 2000; S. 11 – online
- Manfred Riebe: Es ist nie zu spät. Die Front gegen die Rechtschreibreform wird breiter. In: Junge Freiheit Nr. 30 vom 16. Juli 2004, S. 2 – online
- Manfred Riebe; Norbert Schäbler; Tobias Loew (Hrsg.): Der "stille" Protest. Widerstand gegen die Rechtschreibreform im Schatten der Öffentlichkeit, St. Goar: Leibniz-Verlag, Oktober 1997, 298 S., ISBN 3-931155-10-2 – Dokumentation von 21 Initiativen gegen die Rechtschreibreform
- Maria Theresia Rolland: Streitobjekt Sprache. In: Manfred Riebe; Norbert Schäbler; Tobias Loew (Hrsg.): Der "stille" Protest. St. Goar: Leibniz-Verlag, 1997, S. 190 f.
- Maria Theresia Rolland: Korrekte Informationsvermittlung durch Rechtschreibreform gefährdet. In: NFD, Information – Wissenschaft und Praxis, 48 (1997) 5; S. 289–293
- Maria Theresia Rolland: Sprache in Theorie und Praxis. Gesammelte Aufsätze 1995–1997. Würzburg: Königshausen und Neumann, 1999, 247 S., ISBN 3-8260-1585-1
- Wolfgang Roth: Zur Verfassungswidrigkeit der Rechtschreibreform. Zugleich Anmerkungen zum Urteil des BVerfG vom 14.7.1998 – 1 BvR 1640/97. In: Bayerische Verwaltungsblätter, Heft 9, 1. Mai 1999, S. 257–266
- Michael Schneider: Geschichte der deutschen Orthographie – unter besonderer Berücksichtigung der Entwicklung seit 1994. Universität Marburg, 2001, 30 S. – PDF
- Alexander Siegner (Hrsg.): Rechtschreibreform auf dem Prüfstand. Die Rechtschreibreform – Jahrhundertwerk oder Flop? Mit Beiträgen von Reiner Kunze; Stephanus Peil; Theodor Ickler u.a. – St. Goar: Leibniz-Verlag, 1997, 55 S., ISBN 3-931155-08-0
- Dieter Stein (Hrsg.): Rettet die deutsche Sprache. Beiträge, Interviews und Materialien zum Kampf gegen Rechtschreibreform und Anglizismen. Edition JF – Dokumentation, Band 9, Berlin 2004, 192 Seiten, ISBN 3-929886-21-9 (mit Beiträgen u.a. von Theodor Ickler, Walter Krämer, Christian Meier, Thomas Paulwitz, Karin Pfeiffer-Stolz, Manfred Riebe)
- Verein für Deutsche Rechtschreibung und Sprachpflege e. V. (VRS) – Initiative gegen die Rechtschreibreform: Unser Kampf gegen die Rechtschreibreform. Volksentscheid in Schleswig-Holstein. Bearbeitung und Kommentar: Manfred Riebe. Nürnberg: VRS, Dezember 1998, 34 S.
- Johannes Wasmuth: Verbot der Werkänderung und Rechtschreibreform. In: Zeitschrift für Urheber- und Medienrecht (ZUM) Nr. 11/2001, S. 858–865
- Hagen A. Wegewitz: Verfassungsunmittelbare Bindungswirkung abstrahierbarer Auslegungen des Grundgesetzes. Theorie der Bindungswirkung und Methodik zur Ermittlung der tragenden Gründe von Bundesverfassungsgerichtsentscheidungen am Beispiel einer argumentationstheoretischen Analyse der Entscheidungen zur Rechtschreibreform. Zugleich: Dissertation Universität Jena, 2002. Frankfurt am Main; Berlin; Bern; Bruxelles; New York; Oxford; Wien: Lang, 2003, 366 S., ISBN 3-631-50688-0
- Hermann Zabel (Hrsg.): "Keine Wüteriche am Werk". Berichte und Dokumente zur Neuregelung der deutschen Rechtschreibung. Hrsg. in Verbindung mit der Gesellschaft für deutsche Sprache. Hagen: Reiner Padligur Verlag, 1996, 448 S., ISBN 3-922957-46-3
- Hermann Zabel (Hrsg.): Widerworte. "Lieber Herr Grass, Ihre Aufregung ist unbegründet". Antworten an Gegner und Kritiker der Rechtschreibreform. Aachen: Shaker, 1997, 184 S., ISBN 3-8265-2859-X
- Jean-Marie Zemb: Für eine sinnige Rechtschreibung. Eine Aufforderung zur Besinnung ohne Gesichtsverlust. Tübingen: Max Niemeyer Verlag, 1997, 154 S., ISBN 3-484-73047-1
