= Otto Basler =

German philologist

- Born: May 8, 1892; Kitzingen, Bavaria
- Died: May 28, 1975 (aged 83); Freiburg im Breisgau

Academic background
- Education: University of Freiburg

Otto Basler (8 May 1892 in Kitzingen, Bavaria – 28 May 1975 in Freiburg im Breisgau) was a German philologist.

Basler studied German, Romance studies, English and history at the University of Freiburg. In World War I, he was a reserve officer. After his graduation, he was a librarian at the University of Freiburg until 1936, when he became the librarian at the German army library from 1936 to 1945 in Berlin. In 1943, he started teaching at the Ludwig-Maximilians-Universität München, first with a training order for German philology and folklore, and in 1947, he became a professor at the university. From 1952 to his retirement, he taught at the University of Freiburg. He left Freiburg im Breisgau, where he taught since 1952 as a fee professor to 1959. Basler was involved in the German orthography reform of 1944. After the end of the World War II, he published his proposals for a spelling reform in his Leibniz publishing house.
