= Gesellschaft für deutsche Sprache =

German government-sponsored language society

Coordinates: 50°5′7.7″N 8°14′31.6″E

- Predecessor: Allgemeiner Deutscher Sprachverein
- Founded: 1947; 79 years ago
- Founder: Max Wachler
- Location: Wiesbaden, Germany
- Region served: Worldwide
- Chairman: Peter Schlobinski
- Website: gfds.de

The Gesellschaft für deutsche Sprache (German pronunciation: [ɡəˈzɛlʃaft fyːɐ̯ ˈdɔʏtʃə ˈʃpʁaːxə], Association for the German Language), or GfdS, is a language society sponsored by the German Government. Its headquarters are in Wiesbaden. Re-founded shortly after the Second World War in 1947, the GfdS is politically independent and the declared successor of the Allgemeiner Deutscher Sprachverein (ADSV), the General Association for the German Language, which had been founded in 1885 in Brunswick. Its aim is to research and cultivate the German language; to critically evaluate the current German language change; and to give recommendations concerning the current usage of German.

== Activities ==
With its language advice service, the GfdS supports individuals, companies, authorities and institutions concerning questions of the usage of contemporary German with regard to spelling, grammar and style.

In a bi-annual public ceremony, the GfdS awards the Media Award for Language Culture (Medienpreis für Sprachkultur). Furthermore, and in co-operation with the Alexander Rhomberg Foundation, the GfdS awards the annual Alexander Rhomberg Award for young journalists.

Since 1971, the GfdS produces the annual language retrospective, well known for its Word of the Year (German: Wort des Jahres).

The GfdS has a podcast called "Wortcast" and has also been featured on other national and international podcasts such as "Yellow of the Egg" and "Nah am Menschen".

=== Work for the German Parliament ===
The GfdS editorial panel of the parliament (Redaktionsstab der Gesellschaft für deutsche Sprache e. V. beim Deutschen Bundestag) gives linguistic advice to the Bundestag and Bundesrat. They also advise ministries and authorities on both federal and state level as regards the linguistic correctness of draft legislation, by-laws, orders and other texts.

The most important task of the GfdS is to revise the language of draft legislation, by-laws, and orders whose legal terminology must be formulated clearly and concisely.

=== Publications ===
The GfdS publishes two linguistic journals, Der Sprachdienst and Muttersprache.

Der Sprachdienst was founded in 1957 as a result of the practical work of the GfdS, it is the association's newsletter, published bi-monthly, with a circulation of 3,200 (2012) and aims to address a broad, general audience with an interest in linguistic issues. The publication mainly focuses on historical linguistics, grammar, stylistics, phraseology, terminology, onomastics and spelling, but also contains articles dealing with more general questions concerning the use of current German.

The GfdS publishes a highly regarded quarterly academic journal, Muttersprache. As of 2012, it is in its 122nd year of publication, with a circulation of 1,000 covering over 40 countries, and focuses entirely on specialist linguistic matters.

== Organisation ==
The chairman of the GfdS is Armin Burkhardt, a professional linguist and Professor of Germanic Linguistics at Otto-von-Guericke University Magdeburg; the GfdS Secretary is Andrea-Eva Ewels, also a professional linguist.

As of 2012, the association consists of a 103 branches in 35 countries on four continents, 47 in Germany and 56 abroad.

=== German branches ===
As of 2015, 50 GfdS branches are located in Germany, with at least one branch in each of the 16 German federal states:

- Baden-Württemberg (Freiburg, Heidelberg, Karlsruhe, Stuttgart)
- Bavaria (Munich, Nuremberg, Würzburg)
- Berlin
- Brandenburg (Frankfurt (Oder), Potsdam)
- Bremen
- Hamburg
- Hesse (Darmstadt, Frankfurt, Kassel, Marburg, Wiesbaden)
- Lower Saxony (Braunschweig, Celle, Göttingen, Hanover)
- Mecklenburg-Vorpommern (Greifswald, Rostock, Schwerin)
- North Rhine-Westphalia (Aachen, Bonn, Dortmund, Düsseldorf, Duisburg, Münster, Siegen, Wuppertal)
- Rhineland-Palatinate (Koblenz, Mainz, Trier)
- Saxony (Chemnitz, Dresden, Leipzig, Zittau, Zwickau)
- Saxony-Anhalt (Halle (Saale), Magdeburg)
- Saarland (Saarbrücken)
- Thuringia (Erfurt, Weimar)

If a federal state has more than one branch, then at least one branch is located in the capital of the state.

=== Branches outside Germany ===
As of 2015, the GfdS has 59 branches outside Germany, in 38 countries on four continents:

- Africa (6 branches)
  - Egypt (Cairo)
  - Cameroon (Yaoundé)
  - Namibia (Windhoek)
  - South Africa (Johannesburg, Cape Town)
  - Togo (Lomé)
- America (7 branches)
  - Brazil (Porto Alegre, São Paulo)
  - USA (Boston, Chicago, Madison, New York, Philadelphia)
- Asia (11 branches)
  - Armenia (Yerevan)
  - China (Hangzhou, Beijing, Shanghai)
  - India (Pune)
  - Israel (Tel Aviv)
  - Japan (Tokyo)
  - Russia (Omsk, Ural)
  - South Korea (Seoul)
  - Turkey (Ankara)
- Europe (35 branches)
  - Austria (Innsbruck, Vienna)
  - Belgium (Brussels)
  - Bulgaria (Sofia)
  - Croatia (Zagreb)
  - Czech Republic (Prague)
  - Denmark (Copenhagen)
  - Estonia (Tallinn)
  - Finland (Turku, Vaasa)
  - France (Paris)
  - Georgia (Tbilisi)
  - Greece (Athens)
  - Hungary (Budapest)
  - Italy (Bolzano, Milan, Rome)
  - Lithuania (Vilnius)
  - Luxembourg (Luxembourg)
  - Netherlands (Nijmegen)
  - Poland (Warsaw, Wrocław)
  - Romania (Bucharest)
  - Russia (Kaliningrad, Moscow, Nizhny Novgorod, Polar Region, Saratow, St Petersburg, Voronezh)
  - Slovakia (Bratislava)
  - Spain (Madrid)
  - Ukraine (Kiev, Chernivtsi)
  - United Kingdom (London)

=== Co-operation ===
The chairman represents the GfdS on the Council for German Orthography (Rat für deutsche Rechtschreibung). In 2003, both organisations, together with the Goethe-Institut and the Institute of the German Language, founded the German Language Council (Deutscher Sprachrat) which was later also joined by the German Academic Exchange Service (DAAD).

The GfdS is connected to various universities and other education institutions with an interest in linguistics, e.g. the German Academy for Language and Poetry and the Institute of the German Language (IDS).
