= German orthography reform of 1944 =

The planned German spelling reform of 1944 was a failed attempt to amend German orthography. Although one million copies of the new rules were printed by 1944 for school use, the reform was never introduced. Their preparation was initiated by the Reich Education Minister Bernhard Rust and they were drawn up by Otto Basler, Erich Gierach and Karl Reumuth.

On the orders of Hitler, the introduction of the new rules in schools, which had been planned for the start of the 1944–45 school year, was postponed as it was considered "not important for the war effort". Otto Basler produced a slightly revised version of the rulebook in 1948, but the innovations contained in it were not implemented.

== Description ==
- optional changes to the spelling of words of foreign origin to remove non-German combinations, e.g. Filosof for Philosoph meaning philosopher
- the removal of the third consonant in all groups of three consecutive consonants resulting from the combination of two words, e.g. Sauerstoffflasche to Sauerstofflasche, although this was often overcome using a hyphen.
- division of words at the end of a line according to the spoken syllables (wa-rum, da-rüber, Fens-ter)
- the disappearance of the comma before main clauses introduced by und or oder.

Some of the proposed changes, such as the comma before the conjunction und becoming optional and the hyphenation changes, were included in the German spelling reform of 1996.

Some of Rust's proposed spellings could be found in the dictionary up to the 1980s, such as the spelling Kautsch (standard orthography: Couch).

== See also ==
- Spelling reform
- German Orthographic Conference of 1901
- German orthography reform of 1996

== Literature ==
- Otto Basler: Deutsche Rechtschreibung. Regeln und Wörterverzeichnis. Leibniz (später: Oldenbourg), München, 1948 u. ö.
- Wolfgang Kopke: Rechtschreibreform und Verfassungsrecht. Mohr, Tübingen 1995.
- Theodor Ickler: "Die einzige wirkliche Rechtschreibreform in Deutschland". In: Süddeutsche Zeitung, Nr. 129 vom 8. June 1998, p. 9.
- Hanno Birken-Bertsch and Reinhard Markner: Rechtschreibreform und Nationalsozialismus. Ein Kapitel aus der politischen Geschichte der deutschen Sprache, Göttingen: Wallstein, 2000. ISBN 3-89244-450-1.
