= Outline of German language =

West Germanic language

The following outline is provided as an overview of and topical guide to German language.

One of the major languages of the world, German is the first language of almost 100 million people worldwide and the most widely spoken native language in the European Union. Together with French, German is the second most commonly spoken foreign language in the EU after English, making it the second biggest language in the EU in terms of overall speakers.

== Scope ==
German language can be described as having two branches, High German and Low German, as depicted in their family trees below:

- Language family
  - Indo-European languages
    - Proto-Germanic language
      - Germanic languages
        - West Germanic languages
          - German language
            - High German: Standard High German, Central German, Upper German – diachronic: Old High German, Middle High German, New High German
            - Low German – diachronic: Old Saxon, Middle Low German, New Low German

What constitutes a language and what a dialect of a language is a social question into which linguistic factors may, but don't have to, play. For instance, Luxembourgish was in the mid-late 20th century reclassified from originally dialects of German as representing its own language. Austrian and Swiss Standard German may be conceived as their own standards that differ from German Standard German, which makes present-day German a pluricentric language. Attitudes that continue to see German as a monocentric variety, with only one standard, remain strong and lead some scholars to talk of a One Standard German Axiom as a field-defining characteristic.

== Dialects of German language ==
- Aachen dialect
- Alsatian dialect
- Alzenau dialect
- Amana German
- Argentinien-schwyzertütsch dialect
- Austrian German
- Barossa German
- Basel German
- Bavarian language
- Bergish dialects
- Berlin German
- Bernese German
- Bernese German phonology
- Bönnsch dialect
- Brandenburgisch dialect
- Brazilian German
- Central Bavarian
- Central German
- Central Thuringian
- Chemnitz dialect
- Cimbrian language
- Colonia Tovar dialect
- Duisburg dialect
- East Central German
- East Franconian German
- East Frisian Low Saxon
- East Low German
- East Pomeranian dialect
- Eastphalian dialect
- Erzgebirgisch
- Gottscheerish
- Hamburg German
- High Alemannic German
- High German languages
- High Prussian dialect
- Highest Alemannic German
- Historic Colognian
- Hohenlohisch dialect
- Hunsrückisch dialect
- Hutterite German
- Itzgründisch dialect
- Kerkrade dialect
- Kleverlandish
- Colognian dialect
- Koschneiderisch
- Lachoudisch
- Lorraine Franconian
- Lotegorisch
- Low Alemannic German
- Low Lusatian German
- Low Prussian dialect
- Lusatian dialects
- Luxembourgish
- Mecklenburgisch-Vorpommersch dialect
- Meuse-Rhenish
- Missingsch
- Mòcheno language
- Moselle Franconian dialects
- Multiethnolect
- Mundart des Kürzungsgebiets
- Mundart des Ostgebietes
- Mundart des Weichselmündungsgebietes
- Nehrungisch
- Northern Bavarian
- Northern Low Saxon
- Ostkäslausch
- Palatine German language
- Pennsylvania German language
- Plautdietsch language
- Rhine Franconian dialects
- Ripuarian language
- Ruhrdeutsch
- Sathmar Swabian
- Siegerländisch
- Silesian German
- South Franconian German
- South Tyrolean dialect
- Southern Bavarian
- Standard German
- Swabian German
- Swiss German
- Texas German
- Thuringian dialect
- Transylvanian Saxon dialect
- Upper German
- Upper Saxon German
- Viennese German
- Vogtlandian
- Vorerzgebirgisch
- Walser German
- Werdersch
- West Central German
- West Low German
- Westphalian language
- Wisconsin German
- Wymysorys language
- Yenish language
- Zipser German
- Zürich German

== Distribution of German language ==
- List of territorial entities where German is an official language
- Geographical distribution of German speakers

== History of German language ==
- History of German
  - Old High German
    - Middle High German
      - New High German
        - Early New High German
        - Standard German
          - Duden
          - German Orthographic Conference of 1901
          - German orthography reform of 1996
  - Old Saxon
    - Middle Low German
      - Low German

== General German language concepts ==
German grammar

- Accusative absolute
- Adverbial genitive
- German articles
- Der Dativ ist dem Genitiv sein Tod
- German adjectives
- German adverbial phrases
- German compounds
- German conjugation
- German modal particles
- German sentence structure
- Germanic strong verb
- Germanic verb
- Germanic weak verb
- Grammatical gender in German
- Hammer's German Grammar and Usage
- German nouns
- German pronouns
- German verbs
- German declension

German phonology

- Bernese German phonology
- Bühnendeutsch
- Standard German phonology
- Rheinische Dokumenta
- Teuthonista

German orthography

- Council for German Orthography
- Fraktur
- German Orthographic Conference of 1901
- German orthography reform of 1944
- German orthography reform of 1996

== German language dictionaries ==
- List of German dictionaries
- Altägyptisches Wörterbuch
- Cooperative Dictionary of the Rhinelandic Colloquial Language
- Petrus Dasypodius
- Deutsches Fremdwörterbuch
- Deutsches Rechtswörterbuch
- Deutsches Wörterbuch
- Dictionarium quatuor linguarum
- Duden
- Etymological Dictionary of the German Language
- Johannes Fries
- German–Serbian dictionary (1791)
- Der Große Muret Sanders
- Historisch-kritisches Wörterbuch des Marxismus
- LEO (website)
- Linguee
- Josua Maaler
- Österreichisches Wörterbuch
- Prosopographisches Lexikon der Palaiologenzeit
- Reverso (language tools)
- Schweizerisches Idiotikon
- Vocabularius ex quo
- Wörterbuch der ägyptischen Sprache

== German-language encyclopedias ==
- Abrogans
- Agent*In
- Alemannic Wikipedia
- Allgemeine Deutsche Biographie
- The Austro-Hungarian Monarchy in Word and Picture
- Brockhaus Enzyklopädie
- Deutsches Theater-Lexikon
- Encyclopedia of Life
- Encyclopedia of Fairy Tales
- Glottopedia
- Historical Dictionary of Switzerland
- Klein's encyclopedia
- Klexikon
- Munzinger-Archiv
- Oesterreichisches Musiklexikon
- Realencyclopädie der classischen Altertumswissenschaft
- Ripuarian Wikipedia
- Swiss Biographical Archive
- Verfasserlexikon
- German Wikipedia

== German words and phrases ==
- Glossary of Nazi Germany
- List of German expressions in English
- Angstloch
- Arbeit macht frei
- Arbeitseinsatz
- Auslese
- Bambule
- Bandenbekämpfung
- Beerenauslese
- Befehlsnotstand
- Bergfried
- Bildungsbürgertum
- Bildungsroman
- Blut und Boden
- Bundespräsidentenstichwahlwiederholungsverschiebung
- Das Dritte Reich
- Desk murderer
- Dienstmann
- Donaudampfschiffahrtsgesellschaft
- Donaudampfschiffahrtselektrizitätenhauptbetriebswerkbauunterbeamtengesellschaft
- Doppelgänger
- Drang nach Osten
- Drittes Reich
- Eidgenossenschaft
- Eissporthalle
- Endsieg
- Fach
- Fahlband
- Fahrvergnügen
- Festschrift
- Festung
- Feuerschutzpolizei
- Fingerspitzengefühl
- Fräulein
- Freischar
- Freiwilliger Arbeitsdienst (FAD)
- Freiwilliger Helfer der Volkspolizei
- Führer
- Führerprinzip
- Fürst
- Gänsebraten
- Gastarbeiter
- Gau (territory)
- Gauliga
- Gebrauchsmusik
- Gedankenexperiment
- Gegenschein
- Geist
- Geistesgeschichte
- Gemeinde (theology)
- Gemeindepolizei
- Gemeindeverband
- Gemeinschaft and Gesellschaft
- Gemütlichkeit
- Generalmusikdirektor
- Generalplan Ost
- Gesamtbedeutung
- Gesamtkunstwerk
- Gesamtschule
- Gewürztraminer
- Gleichschaltung
- Glockenspiel
- Goetheforschung
- Goldschläger
- Goralenvolk
- Gott mit uns
- Gott strafe England
- Graf
- Grammatischer Wechsel
- Gruppenführer
- Grüß Gott
- Gutmensch
- Hansaplatz
- Hauländer
- Hauptmann
- Hauptstimme
- Hauptvermutung
- Heerstraße
- Heiligenschein
- Heim ins Reich
- Heimat
- Heimatforscher
- Herrenhaus
- Himbeergeist
- Himmelblau
- Hirtenkäse
- Historikerstreit
- Hochmeister
- Hochschule
- Hofmeister (office)
- Hohlraum
- Ich bin ein Berliner
- Jäger (infantry)
- Jedem das Seine
- Josephskreuz
- Journaille
- Jüdischer Kulturbund
- Junker
- Kabarettist
- Kabinett
- Kaiserlich
- Imperial and Royal
- Kaiserreich
- Kaiserthum
- Kammersänger
- Kampfgruppe
- Kanake
- Kanalkrankheit
- Kanne (surname)
- Kapellmeister
- Kapitän
- Kaserne
- Kassirer
- Kassler
- Katzbalger
- Kennkarte
- Kesselgarden
- Kiez
- Kinder, Küche, Kirche
- Kirchweger-Kondensationseinrichtung
- Kleinstaaterei
- Konditorei
- Kongokonferenz
- Königstrasse
- Kriegsspiel (disambiguation)
- Kriminalpolizei
- Kristallnacht
- Kuchen
- Kugel
- Kulturdenkmal
- Kulturgeschichte
- Kulturkampf
- Kunstgewerbeschule
- Kunsthalle
- Künstlerroman
- Lagerstätte
- Länder
- Landesrabbiner
- Landflucht
- Landschaftsverband
- Landsknecht
- Language speaks
- Lebensraum
- Leberkäse
- Lehrstücke
- Leitkultur
- Leitwortstil
- Lesesucht
- Liebfraumilch
- List of stoffs
- Literaturoper
- Loanwords in German
- Luft
- Luftwaffe
- Lügenpresse
- Lutherkirche
- Magenbrot
- Mahlzeit
- Maultasche
- Meine Ehre heißt Treue
- Meistersinger
- Mensch
- Mensurstrich
- Glossary of German military terms
- Ministerpräsident
- Mitläufer
- Mittelafrika
- Mitteleuropa
- Mittelschmerz
- Mittelstand
- Moin
- Muggeseggele
- Multikulti
- Musikdrama
- Muttiheft
- Nacht und Nebel
- Nachtigall
- Nibelung
- Nur für Deutsche
- Nuremberg Funnel
- Oberbürgermeister
- Oberteich
- Ohrwurm
- One-Mensch-Theater
- Opernball
- Ordnung muss sein
- Ordnungspolizei
- Ostalgie
- Ostforschung
- Ostindustrie
- Ostpolitik
- Ostsiedlung
- Pakfront
- Panzer
- Panzerkeil
- Patzer

== People influential in German language ==
=== Linguists ===
- Johann Christoph Adelung
- Johann Christoph Gottsched
- Jacob Grimm
- Simon Heinrich Adolf Herling
- Justus Georg Schottelius
- Kaspar von Stieler

For foreigners:

- Wilhelm Theodor Schiefler
- Harald Weinrich
- George Oliver Curme

== German-language schools ==
- German American School
- German School Kuala Lumpur
- German School of Connecticut
- Deutsche Schule Helsinki
- Internationales Kulturinstitut
- St. Kilian's German School
- Bahçelievler Anatolian High School
- Cağaloğlu Anadolu Lisesi
- German International School New York
- Nikolaus Lenau High School
- German School of Oslo
- Samuel von Brukenthal National College

== See also ==
- Outline of Esperanto
