= Rhinelandic regiolect =

German dialect

The terms Rhinelandic, Rhenish, and Rhinelandic regiolect (German: Rheinischer Regiolekt, pronounced [ˈʁaɪnɪʃɐ ʁeɡi̯oˈlɛkt]) refer to the vernacular lect spoken in the so-called Rhineland of western Germany. This linguistic region roughly consists of the western portion of North Rhine-Westphalia, the northern areas of Rhineland-Palatinate and several smaller adjacent areas, including some in neighbouring countries.

Although there is such a thing as a Rhinelandic accent, and the regiolect uses it, the Rhinelandic variety is not simply German spoken with an accent. Indeed, it differs from Standard German in several thousand commonly used additional words, phrases, and idioms, and some grammatical constructions. Like other German regiolects, there is not a strict definition of what constitutes Rhinelandic; it can be spoken in a way very close to the standard idiom, but if locals talk to each other, it is mostly unintelligible to inhabitants of other German-speaking regions.

Linguists classify the Rhinelandic regiolect as a dialectal variety of Standard German having a strong substratum of the many diverse local community languages of the Rhineland. As such, it occupies a middle position between the group of older West Central German languages, and Low Franconian languages spoken in the Rhineland, and the newer Standard German. The latter has only been brought into the area recently, under the Prussian reign, when local speakers merged many common properties and words of their local languages into the standard language. Thus a new regiolect formed, which in many respects follows the conventions of Standard German, but at the same time continues local linguistic traditions, making it comprehensible in a much wider area than the original local languages. Nevertheless, it still reflects differences inside the dialect continuum of the Rhineland, since speakers often prefer distinct words, styles or linguistic forms depending on the subregion they come from.

== Scientific recognition and documentation ==
Differing across subregions of the Rhineland, and continually evolving, the Rhinelandic regiolect is not easily formalized. Though spoken by millions, it is rarely written down, which hampers scientific treatment. It has long been regarded as 'sheer colloquial speech' by the scientific community, valued too low to be subject of serious recognition and research. Only recently has it shifted into the focus of empirical research of some linguists. Most notably, the linguistics department of the Institut für Landeskunde und Regionalgeschichte (Institute for Regional Studies and History, former: Amt für Rheinische Landeskunde (ARL) – Office of Rhinelandic Regional Knowledge and Documentation) of the Landschaftsverband Rheinland (LVR) has contributed to that work.

Scientists of today's Landschaftsverband have observed, documented, and researched lingual development in the Rhine Province, and lately the Rhineland, for about two hundred years. During the past decades, they have published several studies of the current regiolect, as well as scientific books and papers, popular science books, articles and essays. Some of their findings are available on the internet. They regularly make surveys based on printed questionnaires which more recently can also be obtained and submitted via e-mail. These surveys are supplemented, extended, and updated by use of their interactive website Mitmachwörterbuch der rheinischen Umgangssprache (Cooperative Dictionary of the Rhinelandic Colloquial Language) since 2007.

Literature on colloquialisms and colloquial German generally lists words and phrases coming from the Rhineland, marking their regional provenience appropriately.

Despite obviously not having heen created for this purpose and not including regiolect references at all, the well-known extensive multi-volume compendium Rheinisches Wörterbuch is nevertheless usually very helpful for finding hints to the probable meanings of words of the Rhinelandic regiolect that cannot be determined from other sources. Many regiolectal words come from, or are identical to, local language words which are documented in the Rheinisches Wörterbuch. They usually bear identical, related, or quite similar meanings.

== Grammatical and syntactical deviations from Standard German ==
- Two of the important and most eye-catching characteristics of Rhinelandic are the progressive tense and the so-called "possessive dative", both of which do not exist in the standard language. Rhinelandic constructs progressive forms with the verb "to be", the preposition "am" (= "at the", a Standard German contraction of an dem) and the infinitive, e.g. "Ich bin am Warten" [ɪʃ bɪn aɱ ˈvaːtn̩] (literally: I am at the waiting) is equivalent to English "I am waiting", cf. Dutch "Ik ben aan het wachten" (there is no corresponding contraction nor a German-like case system in Dutch). The possessive-dative construction replaces the standard genitive. The possessor is named in the dative case, followed by a possessive pronoun, e.g. "der alten Frau ihr Mann" [dɐ ˈaltn̩ ˈfʁaʊ iːɐ̯ ˈman] (literally: to the old woman her husband), which is equivalent to English "the old woman's husband". The following exemplary sentence features both a progressive verb construction and a possessive dative. Sentences like this are common in the Rhinelandic parlance, but often not easy to understand for German speakers unfamiliar with it.

Rhinelandic		Dä	Peter	is	→	dem	Manfred	sein	Farrad	am	→Repariern
Dutch	Standard	[~~De~~]	Peter	is	→	[~~van de~~]	Manfred's	-	fiets	aan het	→repareren
Dutch	Colloquial	[~~De~~]	Peter	is	→	[~~van de~~]	Manfred	z'n	fiets	aan het	→repareren
Standard German		[~~Der~~]	Peter	-	repariert	[~~des~~]	Manfreds	-	Fahrrad	-	-
English		[~~The~~]	Peter	is	fixing	[~~of the~~]	Manfred‘s	-	bike	-	-

- There is different use of some prepositions and declensions or grammatical cases:

Rhinelandic	-	komma		bei	mich	[ˈkɔma baɪ ˈmɪʃ]
Standard German	bitte	komme	einmal	zu	mir	[ˈbɪtə ˈkɔmə ʔaɪnmaːl tsu ˈmiːɐ̯]
English	please	come	-	to	me	

- The regiolect sometimes uses a different auxiliary verb to build the past tenses. Most commonly, "vergessen" ("to forget") and "anfangen" ("to begin") take the auxiliary "sein" ("to be") instead of "haben" ("to have"). This is the case especially in the Low Franconian area and makes sentences appear closer to Dutch than to German.

Rhinelandic	ich	bin	dat	ganz	vergessen	-	[ɪʃ bɪn dat ˈɡants fɐˈɡɛsn̩]
Dutch	ik	ben	dat	helemaal	vergeten	-	[ɪɡ bɛn dɑt ˈɦeːləmaːl vərˈɣeːtə(n)]
Standard German	ich	habe	es	völlig	vergessen	-	[ɪç haːbə ʔɛs ˈfœlɪç fɐˈɡɛsn̩]
English	I	have	→	completely	forgotten	→it	

Rhinelandic	ich	bin	dat	ganz	vergessen	gewesen	-	[ɪʃ bɪn dat ˈɡants fɐˈɡɛsn̩ ɡəˈveːzn̩]
Dutch	ik	was	dat	helemaal	vergeten	-	-	[ɪk ʋɑz dɑt ˈɦeːləmaːl vərˈɣeːtə(n)]
Standard German	ich	hatte	es	völlig	vergessen	-	-	[ɪç hatə ʔɛs ˈfœlɪç fɐˈɡɛsn̩]
English	I	had	→	completely	forgotten	-	→it	

- Another phenomenon shared with Dutch is separation of "da + preposition" (dafür; damit = for that; with that). Standard German never splits this construction up, but in Rhinelandic and Dutch it is most common to do so. In this case, Rhinelandic "da" can be placed anywhere in the sentence, the preposition must follow at (or towards) the end of the sentence.

Rhinelandic	Ich	hab	da	kein(e)	Zeit	für	-
Dutch	Ik	heb	daar	geen	tijd	voor	-
Standard German	Ich	habe	dafür	keine	Zeit	-	-
English	I	have	→	no	time	for	→that

- Individual expressions reflect dialectal usage, which also may lead to similarities with Dutch.

Rhinelandic	du	has	den	verschreck jemacht	-	[dʊ has dəɱ fɐˈʃʁɛk jəˈmaxt]
Dutch	je	hebt	hem	laten schrikken	-	[jə ɦɛpt ɦɛm ˈlaːtə(n) ˈsxrɪkə(n)]
Standard German	Du	hast	ihn	erschreckt	-	[du hast ʔiːn ʔɐˈʃʁɛkt]
English	you	have	→	scared or spooked	→him	

- Names of persons, and denominators of roles and social positions are almost always preceded by grammatical articles. References to females, and especially to young females, may decline with the neuter grammatical gender (which is not at all pejorative). Using articles with personal names is wrong in Standard German, but is normal not only in Rhinelandic but also in most dialects and colloquial varieties of German in central and southern Germany, as well as in Austria and Switzerland.

Rhinelandic	es/et/das/dat/de/die	Lisa	heirat	graad
Standard German	[~~die~~]	Lisa	heiratet	gerade
English	[~~the~~]	Lisa	marries	at the moment

Rhinelandic	es/et/das/dat/de/die	Lisa	is	am	heiratn
Standard German	[~~die~~]	Lisa	heiratet gerade		
English	[~~the~~]	Lisa	is	-	marrying

Rhinelandic		et	kütt	:	dä	Schmitz	,	die	Schmitz	,	un	-	et	Schmitz	[ət ˈkʏt dɛ ˈʃmɪts dɪ ˈʃmɪts ʊn ət ˈʃmɪts]
Standard German	(literally)	es	kommt	:	der	Schmitz	,	die	Schmitz		und	-	das	Schmitz	[ɛs ˈkɔmt deːɐ̯ ˈʃmɪts diː ˈʃmɪts ʔʊnt das ˈʃmɪts]
Standard German	(better)	es	kommen		die Eheleute Schmitz						mit	-	Tochter		[ɛs ˈkɔmən di ˈʔeːəlɔʏtə ˈʃmɪts mɪt ˈtɔxtɐ]
English	(literally)	there	comes	:	the (masculine)	Smith	,	the (feminine)	Smith	,	and	-	the (neuter)	Smith	
English	(better)	-	coming are	:	Mr.		and	Mrs. Smith			with	their	daughter		

- People talk about themselves in the third person in specific contexts, also with articles. This can be done in English, too, but not in correct Standard German. For example, a mother addressing her child:

Rhinelandic	-	hasse		-	schön	geputz	,	da	muss	de	Mamma	-	nich	mehr	bei	[gehn]	-
Standard German	das	hast	du	[so]	gut	geputzt	, dass	-	→	ich		-	nicht	[mehr]	nacharbeiten		→muss
English	this	have	you	[so]	nicely	cleaned	, that	-	→	mom / I		→need[s]	not	any [more]	rework		-

== Intermediate position between Standard German and broad dialect ==
The following exemplary sentences may show how the regiolect is related to both Standard German and the actual dialect (Kölsch in this case), and found to be in the middle between the two.

Kölsch Dialect	Rhenish Regiolect	Standard German	English
Jetz setze mer uns_eesch_ens hen un drinke_uns_e Käffje.	Jetz setz'mer uns_ers'ma hin un trinken_uns_en Käffchen. [ˈjɛts ˈzɛtsmɐ ʊnz ˈeːɐ̯sma ˈhɪn ʊn ˈtʁɪŋkŋ̍ ʊnz əŋ ˈkɛfʃn̩]	Jetzt setzen wir uns erst mal hin und trinken einen Kaffee. [ˈjɛtst ˈzɛtsn̩ viːɐ̯ ʔʊns ˈeːɐ̯st maːl ˈhɪn ʔʊnt ˈtʁɪŋkn̩ ʔaɪnən ˈkafe]	Now let's first sit down and have a cup of coffee.
Dann sühd_et Levve att widder anders uß.	Dann siehd_et Leben schonn wider anders_aus. [ˈdan ˈziːd ət ˈleːbm̩ ʃɔn vɪdɐ ˈandɐz ˌaʊs]	Dann sieht das Leben schon wieder anders aus. [ˈdan ˈziːt das ˈleːbn̩ ʃoːn viːdɐ ˈʔandɐs ˌʔaʊs]	After that, life will look much better.
Ärbeide künne mer emmer noch!	Aabeiten köm_mer immer noch! [ˈaːbaɪtn̩ kœmːɐ ˈɪmɐ nɔx]	Arbeiten können wir noch immer! [ˈaʁbaɪtn̩ kœnən viːɐ̯ nɔx ˈʔɪmɐ]	Work can wait a while!

The example shows that the regiolect is based on Standard German. Thus, it uses ers'ma ("first") from the standard "erst mal" (vs. dialect: eesch ens), and schonn ("already") from the standard "schon" (vs. dialect: att or allt). With words common to both languages, vowel and consonant qualities are usually those of the standard (trinken instead of drinke; immer instead of emmer), as are the rules of morphology.

However, the strong dialectal influence is also evident: Word final t/d is often deleted after another consonant (jetz, un); there is a tendency towards vowel shortening (schonn, widder); some structure words come in the dialectal form (mer = "wir"; et = "es, das", cf. Dutch "het"); and words with an initial vowel are most often not separated from the preceding word by a glottal stop, but rather linked to it, like in Swiss and Austrian Standard German, as well as English. If the final sound is a consonant, it is typically realized voiced in this context (both the lack of glottal stops and voicing are marked in the example by an underscore.) This feature is shared with the Luxembourgish language. The regiolect also uses diminutives more often (Käffchen instead of "Kaffee"), and has borrowed from the dialect many syntactical constructions unknown in the standard, e.g. mer trinken uns (en Käffchen), literally "we drink (a coffee) to ourselves", meaning: "to drink something with ease and pleasure." The unrelated Polish language has the same structure: pijemy sobie kawę (meaning the same).

Another good example is the word "afternoon", for which the regiolect uses a form similar to the dialect, but has adapted a vowel and a consonant to the standard.

Kölsch Dialect	Nommedach	[ˈnɔməˌdax]
Rhenish Regiolect	Nammetach	[ˈnaməˌtax]
Dutch	(Na)middag	[ˈnaːmɪˌdɑx], [ˈmɪdɑx]
Standard German	Nachmittag	[ˈnaːxmɪˌtaːk]
English	afternoon	[ˌɑːftəˈnuːn]

The continuum Rhenish dialects – Rhenish regiolect – Standard German is comparable (however not wholly equal) to the continuum Scots – (colloquial) Scottish English – British Standard English in Lowland Scotland. The first end of the continuum is made up by the traditional regional language, which is closely related to the standard, but has had its independent development for several centuries; in both cases, it is alive, but losing ground in everyday communication, especially among younger people. The other end of the continuum is the supra-regional standard language used for example on national television. In between the two, we find the new common speech, which is based on the standard, but has a strong substratum from the traditional language.

== Regional differences ==
The Rhinelandic regiolect has several regional and subregional features. Very many approximately coincide with the general dialect groups found in the local languages. For example:

English	German	Rhinelandic (North)	Rhinelandic (Center)	Rhinelandic (South)
little jar	Gefäß	Kümpken	Kümpche(n)	Kimpche

As usual, the Low Franconian area in the North uses their own way to build the diminutive. The Central Rhineland between the Benrath line and the Sankt Goar line usually has an intermediate position. In this instance, the South uses their own vocalism that already incorporates parts of the Palatinate German one, found even further South.

== Rhinelandic influences on Standard German ==
Like other jargons and regional varieties, the Rhinelandic regiolect has influenced the vocabulary of Standard German. Instances of more recent additions are:

- Knöllchen [ˈknœlʃn̩] − a (parking or similar) ticket
- Poppen [ˈpɔpm̩] − to have sexual intercourse
- Sie sind sich nicht eins [zɪ ˈzɪnt zɪʃ nɪʒd ˈaɪns] − they do not agree − instead of German: Sie sind nicht einig miteinander. Compare Dutch Zij zijn het niet eens.
- kungeln [ˈkʊŋl̩n], Klüngel [ˈklʏŋl̩], rheinische Lösung [ˌʁaɪnɪʃə ˈløːzʊŋ] (Rhinelandic solution) − all three can be understood in the narrowed sense of corruption in office, nepotism, etc.
- Schiss haben [ˈʃɪs ˌhaːbm̩] − to be afraid or anxious; to feel threatened; to be in sorrow about something. (This expression is also in widespread use in Low German)

A grammatical deviation, the am-Progressive as mentioned above, has also invaded the colloquial speech of other parts within the German-speaking areas. Experts state that it can be seen as "almost standard language use in wide parts."

== Bibliography ==
- Dr. Georg Cornelissen: Rheinisches Deutsch. Wer spricht wie mit wem und warum. Greven Verlag, Köln 2005, ISBN 3-7743-0367-3
- Peter Honnen: Kappes, Knies und Klüngel. Regionalwörterbuch des Rheinlandes. Greven, Köln 2003, ISBN 3-7743-0337-1
- Dr. Georg Cornelissen (2008), Meine Oma spricht noch Platt – Wo bleibt der Dialekt im Rheinland? (in German), Köln: Greven Verlag, ISBN 978-3-7743-0417-8
- Peter Honnen (2008), Alles Kokolores? - Wörter und Wortgeschichten aus dem Rheinland (in German), Köln: Greven Verlag, ISBN 978-3-7743-0418-5
- Dr. Georg Cornelissen (2007), Der Niederrhein und sein Deutsch - sprechen tun et fast alle (in German), Köln: Greven Verlag, ISBN 978-3-7743-0394-2
- Klaus J. Zöller: Rheinisch auf deutsch. Herkunft und Bedeutung rheinischer Wörter. 72 Seiten. Bruckmann, München 1974, ISBN 3-7654-1611-8
