= Columbia School of Linguistics =

School of thought in linguistics

The Columbia School of Linguistics is a group of linguists with a radically functional and empirical conception of language. According to their school of thought, the main function of language is communication, and it is this fact that guides the formulation of grammatical hypotheses and constrains the form these hypotheses can take. Columbia School linguistic analyses typically are based on observable data, such as corpora (texts or recorded speech), not on introspective ad hoc sentence examples. Rather than a single theory of language, the Columbia School is a set of orientations in which scholars analyze actual speech acts in an attempt to explain why they take the forms they do. This was the methodology of its founder, the late William Diver, who taught linguistics at Columbia University until his retirement in 1989.

== Orientations ==
On the one hand, this methodology is more modest in its goals than most other schools. On the other hand, the results produced are more reliable, because they are based on objective data, rather than on mentalistic or philosophical entities. The assumption is that modest goals are more appropriate for a linguistic science still in its infancy, a science that hasn't yet freed itself entirely from traditional philological parts of speech, self-standing sentence examples, and logico-philosophical entities such as subject and predicate. Conclusions about how the mind functions, based on the structure of language, should wait until a new, more reliable linguistics emerges, as did astronomy from its origins in astrology.

A useful illustration of the differences between the Columbia School of Linguistics (CSL) and other linguistic approaches is the way each regards the field of mathematics. Rather than considering human language to be itself a kind of logic or mathematics, CSL uses mathematics as a tool to analyze and draw conclusions about languages. Instead of trying to produce rules to generate all possible “grammatical” sentences, CSL scholars count and compare numbers of occurrences of various phenomena and then apply statistical criteria to draw conclusions about the reasons for this usage. These conclusions, although not earth-shattering, are based on the CSL orientations of communication, physiology or psychology. CSL researchers typically search the gray areas for an explanation of why one form appears more often than another, and are not satisfied with a black-and-white mapping of the frontiers of grammaticality. Whereas most linguists talk of constraints and combinations of entities that are not permitted, CSL linguists discuss the choices that speakers of language have and how they make use of those choices.

CSL's basic unit of language is the morpheme, the smallest meaningful unit of language. This is the linguistic sign, the unit shared by all other subdisciplines of semiotics. By taking the sign as the basic unit—as opposed to the sentence—CSL linguists can reasonably compare either spoken or sign language to all other forms of communication through signs, from ideograms to musical notation to bee dancing. It is not a goal of CSL to search for entities of human language that distinguish it from other forms of animal communication. As with all posited entities, CSL will accept them after they have been shown to have a function.

== Semantics ==
One radical approach of CSL is in its treatment of meaning. Rather than assuming that there exist semantic universals—much less that we know what they are—CSL assumes that every linguistic sign has a meaning different from all other signs in any language. Although meanings may be similar, they are never exactly the same. And until it can be objectively shown that a particular sign has multiple meanings, the assumption is that it has only one meaning (elsewhere known as a Gesamtbedeutung), capable of carrying diverse messages. This derives from Ferdinand de Saussure's structuralist perspective on language, whose perspective relies heavily on the dictum "one form - one meaning". For example, many linguists believe that the word with has several meanings, such as instrumental: “cut with a knife,” adversarial: “struggle with your enemies”, and even partitive: “split with the organization,” among others. However, CSL linguists observe that what varies among these uses is not the meaning of with but the message of the phrase, due to the accompanying verbs and nouns. Struggle undoubtedly contributes to the adversarial message, but so does the word enemies; “struggle with your comrades” would likely eliminate the adversarial relationship. The little word with contributes the same weak meaning (something like: “at some time accompanied by”) throughout. Not only do words in the same sentence affect the message conveyed by with, but the surrounding context and the non-linguistic circumstances do so as well. In “don’t struggle with him,” the sense is radically affected by the antecedent of him, whether him was identified in the previous sentence or whether the speaker is pointing to someone likely to be the listener's comrade or enemy.

== Syntax ==
Another distinguishing characteristic of the Columbia school is its approach to syntax. CSL does not attempt to create an algorithm that can generate all possible sentences, because there is no clear dividing line between “grammatical” and “ungrammatical” sentences. Many apparently ungrammatical sentences can find a useful application, given the proper context.

== Phonology ==
CSL differs from other schools in the other major aspect of language, phonology, as well. Here again, CSL does not posit entities, such as binary features, unless they can be shown to have a function. There is nothing in information theory that requires every message to consist ultimately of a binary code. Any linguistic message can be represented by a binary code, just as our decimal number system can be represented binarily. Therefore, the bit can be used as convenient but arbitrary measure of information for speech or for numerical information. But nobody seriously proposes that people fundamentally use binary digits in counting, as some linguists do for speech.

Unlike most other schools, CSL concentrates on articulation, rather than sound, as its object of study (but see also articulatory phonology). For example, CSL attributes the relative rarity in most languages of words beginning with /g/ to its relative difficulty of articulation, not to auditory causes. In the production of a (voiced) /g/, air must pass through the vocal cords while the back of the tongue stops up the vocal tract, blocking that air. Since the resulting chamber of air for /g/ is smaller than for /b/ or /d/, there is less time for air to build up, making it harder to produce a vocal vibration when starting to speak. Thus, through its physiological theoretical orientation, CSL gives an articulatory explanation of the low frequency of initial /g/ in human language. CSL does not neglect sound as the means through which spoken language is transmitted and whose perceptible differences serve to distinguish linguistic signs. However, it considers articulatory gestures, not binary acoustic features, to be the physical units of which any utterance is made up.

== Summary ==
The Columbia School of Linguistics traces its origins through André Martinet and others back to Ferdinand de Saussure, the founder of modern linguistics. Like Saussure, CSL considers a language to be a kind of system “où tout se tient” (where everything depends on or influences everything else). But CSL differs from Saussure and his followers in its interest in substance as well as in form. Saussure emphatically denied the relevance of the physical media (vocal tract, sound) through which language functions, claiming that language consists of nothing but differences, which are phonetically achieved through the use of physical media. But CSL linguists make a practice of explaining the arrangement of various forms (/g/, red barn vs. barn red) through their related substances (air chambers, difference in meaning). CSL researchers set as their goal what other linguists postulate—but do not explain how—children do as they acquire their first language, that is, they analyze the undifferentiated mass of linguistic input actually produced by people. Rather than marveling at the infinitude of possible sentences that could be produced by an algorithm, CSL linguists wonder at the remarkable skill that humans have in employing a limited number of physical resources and meanings to produce a myriad of messages appropriate for a myriad of situations.

== Sources ==
- Contini-Morava, Ellen, and Goldberg, Barbara Sussman (eds.) 1995. Meaning as explanation: Advances in linguistic sign theory. Berlin: Mouton De Gruyter.
- Davis, Joseph, Radmila J. Gorup, and Nancy Stern (eds.). 2006. Advances in Functional Linguistics: Columbia School Beyond its Origins. Philadelphia / Amsterdam: John Benjamins.
- Diver, William. 1979. "Phonology as human behavior." In Doris Aaronson and Robert Rieber (eds.) Psycholinguistic research: implications and applications. Hillsdale, NJ: Lawrence Erlbaum Assoc., pp. 161–186.
- Huffman, Alan. 1997. The Categories of grammar: French lui and le. Amsterdam: John Benjamins.
- --- 2001. "The Linguistics of William Diver and the Columbia School." Word 52:1, 29–68.
