= Friedrich August Grotefend =

German philologist (1798–1836)

Friedrich August Grotefend (12 December 1798 in Ilefeld to 28 February 1836 in Göttingen) was a German philologist. Grotefend was a relative of Georg Friedrich Grotefend, who deciphered the cuneiform writing.

== Biography ==
Grotefend studied theology and philology at the University of Göttingen, and afterwards was a teacher at the Pädagogium in Ilefeld (from 1821). In 1831 he was appointed director of the gymnasium in Göttingen. In 1835 he received an associate professorship at the University of Göttingen, however he died soon afterwards on 28 February 1836.

His work was largely in the field of Latin grammar, being especially concerned with its aspects of syntax.

== Publications ==
- Grundzüge einer neuen Satztheorie auf die Theorie des Herrn Prof. Herling. Hannover (1827) – Principles of a new set theory: in relation to the theory of Simon Heinrich Adolf Herling.
- Ausführliche Grammatik der lateinischen Sprache (A complete grammar of the Latin language). 2 vols. Hannover (1829–30).
- Lateinische Schulgrammatik. 2 vols. Hannover (1842).
