= Hieronymus Megiser =

German polymath, linguist and historian

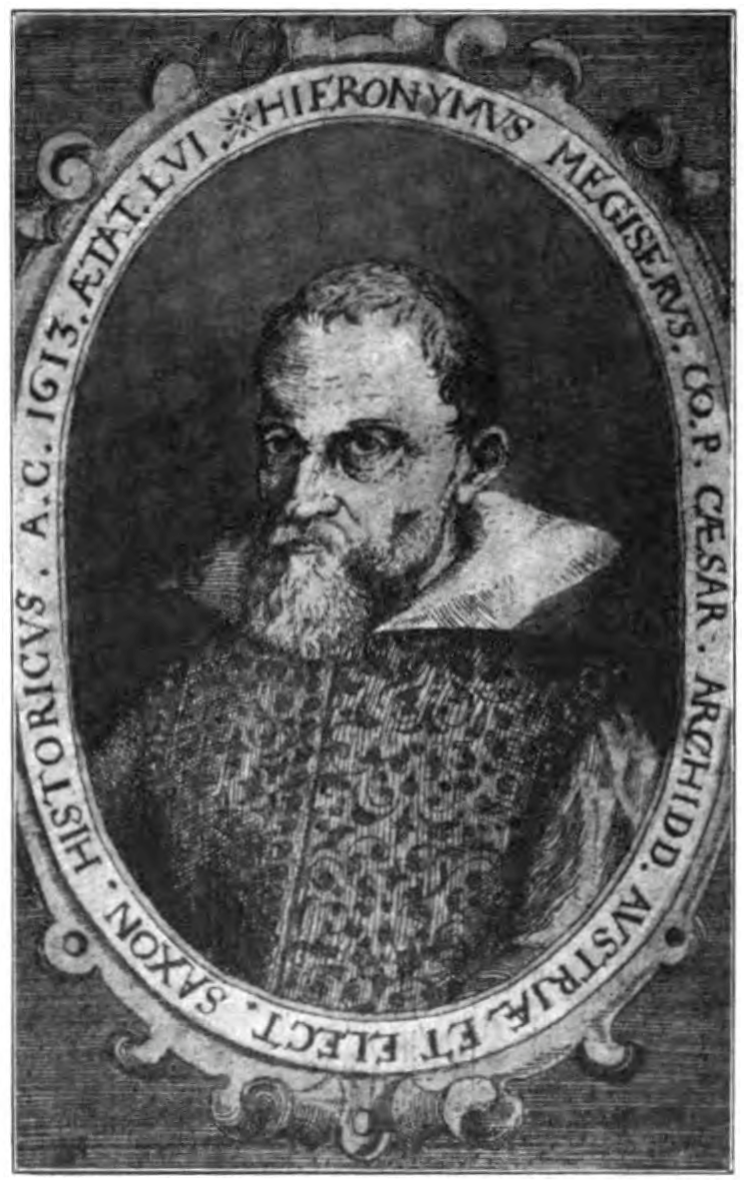
Hieronymus Megiserus (1613)

Hieronymus Megiser (c. 1554 in Stuttgart – 1618 or 1619 in Linz, Austria) was a German polymath, linguist and historian.

== Career ==
From 1571 he studied at the University of Tübingen, and was a favourite student of the humanist and philologist Nicodemus Frischlin. In 1577 he graduated there with a master's degree. In 1581 he moved as a private tutor to Ljubljana (Laibach). From 1582 he studied jurisprudence in Padua and was then active as a private tutor of young noblemen from Croatia and Styria. In 1588/89 he travelled to Italy and Malta, and in 1591 to North Germany, the Netherlands and England.

In 1590/91 he was granted the title of "Ordinarius Historiographus" by Archduke Charles in Graz. In 1592, still in Graz, he published his Dictionarium quatuor linguarum, the first multilingual dictionary of Slovene. He made the acquaintance of the young Johannes Kepler, and remained in learned correspondence with him. After further travels he settled in Frankfurt am Main and married the daughter of the printer Johann Spiess. From 1593 until 1601 he was the Rector of the Protestant Collegium sapientiae et pietatis in Klagenfurt, Carinthia.

After returning to Frankfurt am Main he became Professor of History at the University of Leipzig. From 1610 the interest of the Upper Austrian dignitaries in history was so great that they required a historian to head up the provincial library, in a similar way to a court historian. Megiser was selected for this role in 1615, and was commissioned to write a chronicle of the province.

In 1612 he published Annales Carinthiae or Chronica des Loeblichen Ertzhertzogthumbs Khaerndten, which he signed as his own work, although it was mainly written by Carinthian pastor Michael Gothard Christalnick and only edited by Megiser on the request of the Carinthian Estates.
