= Articulatory gestures =

Articulatory gestures are the actions necessary to enunciate language. Examples of articulatory gestures are the hand movements necessary to enunciate sign language and the mouth movements of speech. In semiotic terms, these are the physical embodiment (signifiers) of speech signs, which are gestural by nature (see below).

The definition of gesture varies greatly, but here it will be taken in its widest sense, namely, any meaningful action. An intentional action is meaningful if it is not strictly utilitarian: for example, sending flowers to a friend is a gesture, because this action is performed not only for the purpose of moving flowers from one place to another, but also to express some sentiment or even a conventional message in the language of flowers. Use of the broadest definition of gesture (not restricted to hand movements) allows Hockett’s “rapid fading” design feature of human language to be accommodated as a type of sign in semiotic theory.

But if an articulatory gesture is to be considered a true gesture in the above sense, it must be meaningful. Therefore, an articulatory gesture must be at least as large as the smallest meaningful unit of language, the morpheme. A morpheme corresponds roughly to a spoken word or a sign language gesture.

This definition differs from the practice, common among linguists, of referring to phonemes (meaningless mouth movements) as articulatory gestures (see articulatory phonology). In semiotics, meaningless components of spoken gestures (written as individual letters), or meaningless components of sign language gestures (such as location of hand contact) are known as figurae, the constituents of signs.

It also differs from the tradition of considering speech sounds to be the signifiers of speech signs. But this practice confuses signals with symbols. Sound and light are analogue signals, whereas mouth and hand gestures are discrete symbolic entities. A sound or light signal is subject to random noise, whereas the image of the gesture is subject to regular distortion, as when a signer's hand is viewed from different angles. In speech, the sound of the contact of the tongue in the letter T can be distorted by surrounding mouth movements, as in the phrase “perfect memory”. When pronounced at conversational speed, the sound of the tongue contact is completely obscured by surrounding consonants even though this T movement is fully carried out.

Articulatory gestures, when seen as the physical embodiment of speech and sign language symbols, provide a link between these two language types, and show how speech resembles sign language more closely than is generally presumed.

== See also ==
- Language production
- Linguistic performance

== References and further reading ==
- Eccardt, Thomas. (2006). "The case for articulatory gestures -- not sounds -- as the physical embodiment of speech signs." In Joseph Davis, Radmila J. Gorup and Nancy Stern. Advances in Functional Linguistics: Columbia School beyond its Origins. Amsterdam: John Benjamins.
- Hockett, Charles. (1960). "Logical Considerations in the Study of Animal Communication." In W. Lanyon and W. Tavogla (eds.), Animal Sounds and Communication. Washington, D.C.: American Institute of Biological Sciences
