= Duisburg dialect =

Extinct dialect of Duisburg, Germany

- Düsbergsch Platt
- Native to: Germany
- Region: Duisburg
- Language family: Indo-European: Germanic; West Germanic; Low Franconian; Kleverlandish or South Low Franconian; Duisburg dialect

Language codes
- ISO 639-3: –
- Glottolog: None

Duisburg dialect (German: Duisburger Platt, pronounced [ˈdyːsbʊʁɡɐ ˌplat]; Dutch: Duisburgs, pronounced [ˈdyzbur(ə)ks] or [ˈdœyzbʏr(ə)xs]; Duisburg dialect: Düsbergsch Platt) is the extinct Low Franconian dialect that was spoken in the German city of Duisburg.

During the 20th century, a Ruhr/Lower Rhine regiolect, with traces of the old dialect in grammar, syntax and vocabulary gradually became dominant in the Duisburg region. The Duisburg dialect became extinct in spoken form, between the 1950s and 1970s.

== Features and classification ==
The dialect was located close to the northern side of the Uerdingen line, a linguistic isogloss within the continental West Germanic languages in Europe, separating dialects that preserve the -k sound in the first person singular pronoun word "ik" (north of the line) from dialects in which the word final -k has changed to a final -ch in the word "ich" (ç) (south of the line). In the west, that sound shift is the one that progressed the farthest north among the consonant shifts that characterize High German and Low German dialects. The line passes through Belgium, the Netherlands and Germany. Based on this feature, the Duisburg dialect is often classified as part of the Kleverlandish dialect group.

The Duisburg dialect shared with South Low Franconian the High German split of Proto-West Germanic (PWGmc) closing diphthongs *ai – *au – *au (+ umlaut) (cf. Middle High German (MHG) ê – ô – ö̂ vs. ei – ou – öü, as in modern German Schnee 'snow' vs Stein 'stone'), and did not take part in *ai-umlaut that split PWGmc *ai into /eː/ and /ai/ triggered by the vowel in the following unstressed syllable and which occurred in Low German and most Low Franconian dialects (including Kleverlandish in a stricter sense). It further had Rhenish pitch accent. Based on these features, Peter Wiesinger placed Duisburg in the "Ripuarian-Low Franconian transitional area" (Wiesinger's term for South Low Franconian in a broader sense), rather than assigning it to Kleverlandish. The vocalism of Duisburg is further characterized by the merger of the Old Low Franconian falling diphthongs *ie - *üö - *uo with the high long vowels *iː - *üː - *uː, which is a typical feature for dialects of the area where Kleverlandish and South Low Fronconian meet.

== Examples ==
Duisburg dialect:

Wellem van der Weppe wor all fis op Johre, as hä sech en Frau nohm. Hä wor ömmer
en betzke vörsechtig en allem.
„Jezz bös do noch los on ledig,“ sagg hä sich, as hä fiefonvertig Johr old wor,
„on wezz, wat do häss, ävver wat do kriggs, wenn do dich en Frau op de Hals
hängs, dat wezz do noch lang nit!“

Dutch:

Wilhelm van der Weppe was al jaren oud als hij een vrouw nam. Hij was immer
een beetje voorzichtig in alle dingen.
„Nu ben je nog los en ongehuwd“, zei hij als hij vijfenveertig jaar oud was,
„en je weet wat je hebt, maar wat je krijgt als je je een vrouw op de hals haalt,
dat weet je nog lang niet!“

English:

Wellem van der Weppe was years old when he took a wife. He has always been
a bit careful in all matters.
"Now I am free and unmarried", he said when he was forty-five years old.
"now I know what I have, but what I will get when I am saddled with a wife,
that I do not know by far yet!"

German:

Wilhelm van der Weppe war schon alt an Jahren, als er sich eine Frau nahm. Er war immer ein bisschen vorsichtig in allem.
„Jetzt bist du noch frei und ledig,“ sagte er sich, als er fünfundvierzig Jahre alt war,
und weißt, was du hast, aber was du bekommst, wenn du dir eine Frau an den Hals
hängst, das weißt du noch lang nicht!“

Duisburg dialect	Dutch	English	German
all	al	already	bereits
as	als	when	als
äte(n)	eten	eat	essen
Daach	dag	day	Tag
dat	dat	that	das
drinke(n)	drinken	drink	trinken
ek	ik	I	ich
en betzke	een beetje	a bit	ein bisschen
et	het	it	es
fiefonvertig	vijfenveertig	forty-five	fünfundvierzig
glöhwe(n)	geloven	believe	glauben
hä	hij	he	er
loss	los	free	frei
make(n)	maken	make	machen
nehme(n)	nemen	take	nehmen
nit	niet	not	nicht
noch lang nit	nog lang niet	not yet so far	noch lange nicht
on	en	and	und
ohld	oud	old	alt
segge(n)	zeggen	say	sagen
tien	tien	ten	zehn
trecke(n)	trekken	pull (drag)	ziehen
tüschen [ˈtyʃən]	tussen	between	zwischen
twee	twee	two	zwei
vandaach [vanˈdaːx]	vandaag	today	heute
vörsechtig	voorzichtig	cautious	vorsichtig
weete(n)	weten	know	wissen
wat	wat	what	was

== Literature ==
- Georg Böllert: Ut Old Düsberg’s Tid, Georg Böllert, Duisburg, 1934 (originally published in 1911)
- Heinrich Neuse: Studien zur niederheinischen Dialektgeographie in den Kreisen Rees, Dinslaken, Hamborn, Mülheim, Duisburg, in: DDG [= Deutsche Dialektgeographie] 8, Marburg, Friedrich (1915)

== See also ==
- Ruhrdeutsch
