= William Diver =

American linguist

- Born: July 20, 1921; Chicago, Illinois, United States
- Died: August 31, 1995 (aged 74); Nantucket, Massachusetts, United States
- Education: Lawrence College (B.A.); Harvard University (M.A.); Columbia University (Ph.D.)
- Occupations: Linguist; professor

William Diver (July 20, 1921 – August 31, 1995) was an American linguist. He was the founder of the Columbia School of Linguistics, which is named after Columbia University, where he received his Ph.D. in comparative Indo-European linguistics.

Although his background lay mainly in the linguistics of ancient languages, his approach to linguistics was uniquely modern and scientific. His lectures were sprinkled with references to the history and the methodology of science. He believed that science is explanation, not description or prediction, and he compared the explanatory power of the Copernican astronomical system with the explanatory weakness of the epicycles of the Ptolemaic system, both of which had equal descriptive and predictive power. He also believed that the purpose of language was chiefly communication, and his linguistic analyses reflected that orientation, along with that of human psychology and physiology. In other words, those orientations helped him to explain why languages take the forms they do.

During Diver’s career, most popular schools of linguistic thought tended towards pure formalism, based on traditional categories and entities, such as the parts of speech and the sentence. While this schools rejected prescriptivism and the idealization of the standard language, Diver stood almost alone in rejecting traditional entities that had no specific function, such as the syllable and the mechanistic interpretation of "government" or "agreement." He analyzed language as a form of human behavior, rather than as an idealized expression of truth. The article on the Columbia School of Linguistics has more details and successful application of Diver's methodology.

== Life ==
Born in Chicago, Diver received his B.A. from Lawrence College in 1942, his M.A. in English literature from Harvard and his Ph.D. in comparative Indo-European linguistics from Columbia University. He served in the US Navy during World War II and earned the Legion of Merit. He taught linguistics from 1955 to 1989 at Columbia University. He died at 74 while he was on a sailing vacation in Nantucket.

== Works ==
- Language, Communication and Human Behavior: The Linguistic Essays of William Diver. Huffman, A. & Davis, J. (eds). Leiden/Boston: Brill (2012).
- "The system of relevance of the Homeric verb," Acta Linguistica Hafniensia 12, 45-68 (1969).
- "Substance and value in linguistic analysis," in Semiotext(e) 1, 13-30 (1974).
- "Phonology as human behavior," in D. Aaronson and R. Rieber (eds.) Psycholinguistic Research: Implications and Applications. Hillsdale, N.Y.: Lawrence Erlbaum Assoc., pp. 161–182 (1979).
- "Theory," in E. Contini-Morava and B. Goldberg (eds.) Meaning as Explanation: Advances in Linguistic Sign Theory. Berlin: Mouton de Gruyter (1995).
