= German adjectives =

Aspect of the German language

German adjectives come before the noun, as in English, and are usually not capitalized. However, as in French and other Indo-European languages, they are inflected when they come before a noun. (But, unlike in French, they are not inflected when used as predicative adjectives.) That is, they take an ending that depends on the gender, case, and number of the noun phrase.

== Adjective inflection ==
German adjectives take different sets of endings in different circumstances. Essentially, the adjectives must provide case, gender and number information if the articles do not.

This table lists the various endings, in order masculine, feminine, neuter, plural, for the different inflection cases. For example, "X e X e" denotes "ein, eine, ein, eine"; and "m r m n" denotes "gutem, guter, gutem, guten".

| | Nominative | Accusative | Dative | Genitive |
|---|---|---|---|---|
| Strong inflection endings No article, or following quantity | r e s e | n e s e | m r m n | n r n r |
| Mixed inflection endings Following indefinite article or possessive determiner | r e s n | n e s n | n n n n | n n n n |
| Weak inflection endings Following definite article | e e e n | n e e n | n n n n | n n n n |
| Indefinite article / possessive determiner endings E.g. ein-, kein-, mein-, dein-, ihr-, etc. | X e X e | n e X e | m r m n | s r s r |
| Definite article E.g. der, das, die, den, etc. | r e s e | n e s e | m r m n | s r s r |

Here are some examples:

- Strong inflection, since no article:

Guter Mann, gutes Kind, gute Frau und gute Menschen.
Good man, good child, good woman and good people.

- Mixed inflected, since following indefinite article:

Er ist ein guter Mann, es ist ein gutes Kind, sie ist eine gute Frau und sie sind keine guten Menschen.
He is a good man, he/she is a good child, she is a good woman and they are not good people.

- Weak inflection, since following definite article:

Der gute Mann, das gute Kind, die gute Frau und die guten Menschen.
The good man, the good child, the good woman and the good people.

- No inflection, since not preceding a noun:

Der Mann ist gut, das Kind ist gut, die Frau ist gut und die Menschen sind gut.
The man is good, the child is good, the woman is good and the people are good.

=== Strong inflection ===
The strong inflection is used when there is no article at all, or if the noun is preceded by a non-inflectable word or phrase such as ein bisschen, etwas or viel ("a little, some, a lot of/much"). It is also used when the adjective is preceded merely by another regular (i.e. non-article) adjective. More specifically, strong inflection is used:

- When no article is used
- When a quantity is indicated by
  - etwas (some; somewhat), mehr (more)
  - wenig- (few), viel- (much; many), mehrer- (several; many), einig- (some)
  - a number (greater than one, i.e. with no endings), without a definite article before it
  - non-inflectable phrases: ein paar (a couple of; a few), ein bisschen (a bit; a little bit)

The adjective endings are similar to the definite article endings, apart from the adjectival ending "-en" in the masculine and neuter genitive singular. (Note: the masculine and neuter genitive singular was originally "-es", as might be expected, but the weak ending "-en" began to displace it by the seventeenth century, and became common by the mid-eighteenth.)

| | Masculine | Feminine | Neuter | Plural |
|---|---|---|---|---|
| Nominative | neuer | neue | neues | neue |
| Accusative | neuen | neue | neues | neue |
| Dative | neuem | neuer | neuem | neuen |
| Genitive | neuen | neuer | neuen | neuer |

=== Mixed inflection ===
The mixed inflection is used when the adjective is preceded by an indefinite article (ein-, kein-) or a possessive determiner.

Note: The prevailing view is that the mixed inflection is not a true inflection in its own right, but merely the weak inflection with a few additions to compensate for the lack of the masculine nominative and neuter nominative and accusative endings.

Mixed inflection is used after:

- indefinite article ein-, kein-, eine, keine
- possessive determiners "mein-", "dein-", "sein-", "ihr-" etc.

Nominative and accusative singular endings are the same as in the strong inflection; all other forms end with "-en".

| | Masculine | Feminine | Neuter | Plural |
|---|---|---|---|---|
| Nominative | ein neuer | eine neue | ein neues | meine neuen |
| Accusative | einen neuen | eine neue | ein neues | meine neuen |
| Dative | einem neuen | einer neuen | einem neuen | meinen neuen |
| Genitive | eines neuen | einer neuen | eines neuen | meiner neuen |

=== Weak inflection ===
The weak inflection is used when there is a definite word in place (der [die, das, des, den, dem], jed-, jen-, manch-, dies-, solch- and welch-). The definite word has provided most of the necessary information, so the adjective endings are simpler.

The endings are applicable to every degree of comparison (positive, comparative, and superlative).

Weak inflection is used after:

- definite article (der, die, das, etc.)
- derselb- (the same), derjenig- (the one)
- dies- (this), jen- (that), jeglich- (any), jed- (every), which decline similarly to the definite article
- manch- (some), solch- (such), welch- (which), which decline similarly to the definite article
- alle (all)
- beide (both)

Five endings in the nominative and accusative cases end with -e, all others with -en.

| | Masculine | Feminine | Neuter | Plural |
|---|---|---|---|---|
| Nominative | der neue | die neue | das neue | die neuen |
| Accusative | den neuen | die neue | das neue | die neuen |
| Dative | dem neuen | der neuen | dem neuen | den neuen |
| Genitive | des neuen | der neuen | des neuen | der neuen |

=== No inflection ===
Several quantifying words are not (always) inflected:

- nichts, wenig, etwas, viel, and genug

"wenig" and "viel" can be put in the plural, where they take endings as normal: viele/wenige Kinder

== Adjective comparison ==
=== Positive form ===
The basic form of the adjective is the positive form: the adjective stem with the appropriate ending.

schön (basic positive form)
das schöne Lied ("the beautiful song")

=== Comparative form ===
The basic comparative form consists of the stem and the suffix -er. Inflected, the corresponding adjective ending is attached.

schöner (basic comparative form)
das schönere Lied ("the more beautiful song")

=== Superlative form ===
A predicate form of the superlative is actually a prepositional phrase. One attaches the suffixes -st and the adjective ending -en to the root, and the word am is put before it.

am schönsten ("the most beautiful")
Ich finde dieses Haus am schönsten. ("I find this house (to be) the most beautiful.")

The attributive superlative form adds the "st" to the comparative root and then the conventional adjective ending.

das schönste Lied

This form can also be placed in a predicate position with the appropriate adjective ending:

Dieses Haus ist das schönste. ("This house is the most beautiful.")
