= Martin Durrell =

English academic

Martin Durrell (born 6 November 1943) is an English academic who is known for his study of the German language. In 1990, Durrell was appointed to the Henry Simon Chair of German at the University of Manchester, until becoming professor emeritus at his retirement in 2008.

== Biography ==
Durrell graduated from Jesus College, Cambridge in Modern & Medieval Languages before earning a Diploma in General Linguistics at the University of Manchester. He then completed a doctorate at the University of Marburg.

From 1967 to 1986, Durrell worked as a lecturer at the University of Manchester before spending four years as Professor of German at the Royal Holloway and Bedford College, University of London.

From 1998 to 2008, Durrell was a member of the International Academic Council of the Institut für Deutsche Sprache (IDS). From 1995 to 2004, he served on the international committee of the Internationale Vereinigung für Germanistik (IVG) (serving as Vice-President during 2004-05). Durrell is particularly known for his work on the text Hammer's German Grammar and Usage which is recognised as the foremost English language reference guide to German grammar.

In 2002, Durrell was given the award of Bundesverdienstkreuz (Order of Merit of the Federal Republic of Germany) for his services to British-German understanding and, in 2020, received the prize of the Director of the Institut für Deutsche Sprache for lifetime achievement in international German linguistics.
