= Grammatical gender in German =

All German nouns are included in one of three genders: masculine, feminine or neuter. While the gender often does not directly influence the plural forms of nouns, there are exceptions, particularly when it comes to people and professions (e.g. Ärzte/Ärztinnen).

In German, it is useful to memorize nouns with their accompanying definite article in order to remember their gender. (Note: While Donaldson (2007) says that it is imperative to do so, Durrell (2017) only mentions that is an ideal method.) However, for about 80% of nouns, the grammatical gender can be deduced from their singular and plural forms and their meaning.

== Noun forms ==
Derivational suffixes in particular, together with most noun endings, consistently relate with specific genders, and there are very few frequent exceptions to this (as reflected in the first column). Nevertheless, the details in the second column are not solid rules, and their irregularities should be noted.

Noun forms and gender (Note: The lists of exceptions here do not necessarily include all of them. Furthermore, the notes referring to the information in the chart are referenced using the pages on its caption.)
Masculine endings (Note: Except das Genus (gender), das Korpus (collection of texts), das Labor (laboratory), das Tempus (tense), das Virus [colloquial also der Virus] (virus), das Tor (gate).)	Masculine gender indications
-ant, -ast, -ich, -ig, -ismus, -ling, -or, -us	The majority of nouns which come from strong verbs without a suffix (but often with a vowel change). (Note: But: das Grab, das Lied, das Maß, das Schloss, das Verbot.)
-ant, -ast, -ich, -ig, -ismus, -ling, -or, -us	60% of nouns in -el and -er, as well as 80% of those in -en, (Note: Since no feminine nouns end in en.) are masculine. (Note: Nouns with -er arising from verbs are masculine (anyhow, most of them describe human beings). Four categories which are not masculine: Nouns which stem from verb infinitives in -en are neuter (das Kochen); Nouns in -sel and -tel are neuter (see the first column); Roughly 15% of the other nouns in -el, -en and -er are neuter; Circa 25% of those in -el and -er are feminine.)
-ant, -ast, -ich, -ig, -ismus, -ling, -or, -us	67% of monosyllabic nouns. (Note: The rest are 19% neuter and 14% feminine.)
Feminine endings (Note: Apart from das Sofa, das Genie, der Atlantik, der Pazifik, das Mosaik, das Abitur, das Futur, das Purpur.)	Feminine gender indications
-a, -ei, -enz, -heit, -ie, (Note: Donaldson (2007) asserts that all nouns of French origin ending in -ie, -ik and -ion are feminine.) -ik, -in, (Note: Chemical terms which end in -in (pronounced [iːn]) are neuter (das Benzin, das Protein).) -keit, -schaft, -sion, -tät, -tion, -ung, (Note: When -ung is used as a suffix to create a noun from a verb, the result is always feminine, e.g. die Bildung (from bilden). A few exceptions exist where -ung derives from the verb's stem, such as der Sprung (from springen) and der Schwung (from schwingen)) -ur	Most nouns ending in -t originating from verbs. (Note: Except for: der Dienst, der Durst, der Frost, der Halt, der Spalt, der Trost, der Verdienst, der Verlust, das Gift.)
-a, -ei, -enz, -heit, -ie, -ik, -in, -keit, -schaft, -sion, -tät, -tion, -ung, -ur	90% of nouns in -e. (Note: The main exceptions are: A few neuter nouns, the most common of which are: das Auge, das Ende, das Erbe (when it means 'inheritance' or 'heritage'), das Finale, das Image, das Interesse, das Prestige, das Regime.; der Charme and der Käse; Most nouns with the prefix Ge- are neuter, even if they end with an -e (see the chart); Nine exceptional masculines: der Buchstabe, der Friede, der Funke, der Gedanke, der Glaube, der Haufe, der Name, der Same, der Wille (these end in -n in the plural and in the accusative and dative singular, but in -ns in the genitive singular); The weak masculines which are names of male persons and animals: der Affe, der Bote, der Hase, der Junge, der Löwe (the weak masculines are a group of nouns, most of which denote male humans or animals, which end in -n or -en in the plural and in all cases besides the nominative).)
Neuter endings (Note: Excluding die Firma, die Insel, der Streusel, der Irrtum, der Reichtum, der Konsum, der Moment, der Zement.)	Neuter gender indications
-chen, -lein, -ma, -ment, -sel, -tel, -tum, -um	90% of the nouns with the prefix Ge-. (Note: The irregularities here are: Categories of humans (der Gehilfe–die Gehilfin ‘assistant’ etc); A large number of feminine and masculine nouns: die Gebärde, die Gebühr, die Geburt, die Geduld, die Gefahr, die Gemeinde, die Geschichte, die Geschwulst, die Gestalt, die Gewähr, die Gewalt; der Gebrauch, der Gedanke, der Gefallen (favour), der Gehalt (content), der Gehorsam, der Genuss, der Geruch, der Gesang, der Geschmack, der Gestank, der Gewinn (Gefallen and Gehalt are neuter when they mean ‘pleasure’ and ‘salary’, respectively.).)
-chen, -lein, -ma, -ment, -sel, -tel, -tum, -um	Two-thirds of nouns in -nis and -sal. (Note: About a third of them are feminine. More specifically, nouns derived from adjectives with the suffix -nis are primarily feminine.)
-chen, -lein, -ma, -ment, -sel, -tel, -tum, -um	Most nouns ending in -al, -an, -ar, -är, -at, -ent, -ett, -ier, -iv, -o and -on (which are of foreign origin), provided that they designate things. (Note: If they describe persons, they are masculine. Irregularities: der Altar, der Apparat, der Automat, der Kanal, der Kanton, der Kommentar, die Manier, die Moral, die Person, der Salat, der Senat, der Skandal.)

Notes: exceptions and irregularities

== Noun meanings ==
The gender of many nouns can be seen by their meaning. However, in almost all circumstances, the rules in the paragraph above override those given here.

Noun meanings and gender
Masculine (der)	Male human beings and animals.	but, for example: die männliche Giraffe (feminine meaning the male giraffe)
Masculine (der)	Seasons, months and days of the week. (Note: As usual, compounds carry the gender of their second component.)	but: die Mittwoche (dated form for der Mittwoch)
Masculine (der)	Compass points, words about winds and types of weather.	but: die Windböe; das Wetter, Gewitter
Masculine (der)	Rocks and minerals.	
Masculine (der)	Alcoholic and plant-based drinks.	but: das Bier
Masculine (der)	Car brands.	
Masculine (der)	Rivers outside Germany. (Note: The nouns which end in either -a or -e are typically feminine.)	
Masculine (der)	Names of currencies.	but: die (Deutsche) Mark, das (britische) Pfund
Masculine (der)	Names of the planets of the Solar System.	but: die Venus, die Erde
Masculine (der)	Mountains and mountain ranges.	but: das Gebirge
Masculine (der)	Rain and Precipitation	
Feminine (die)	Female human beings and animals.	but, for example: das Mädchen
Feminine (die)	Fruits, trees, and many flowers.	but: der Apfel; trees ending in -baum
Feminine (die)	Planes, ships and motorbikes. (Note: Names of planes and ships frequently have the gender of their base words.)	but: das Flugzeug, Schiff, Motorrad
Feminine (die)	Names of numerals.	
Neuter (das)	Young human beings and animals.	but: der Säugling
Neuter (das)	Metals and chemical elements.	but: der Kohlenstoff, Sauerstoff, Stickstoff, Wasserstoff
Neuter (das)	Scientific units.	but: der Meter; der/das Liter
Neuter (das)	Letters and musical notes.	but: der Buchstabe; die Note
Neuter (das)	Cafés, cinemas, hotels and restaurants.	
Neuter (das)	Names of companies with no article. (Note: Less commonly, these names act as feminines.)	
Neuter (das)	Cities, towns, countries, provinces and continents. (Note: Except several feminines, masculines and names ending in -a, -e, -ei or -ie (besides Afrika and China).)	but: die Schweiz; der/(das) Iran, Irak, Sudan
Neuter (das)	Different parts of speech used as nouns (most importantly, this category contains verb substantivisations, but also languages, colours and so on).	
Neuter (das)	Fractions.	

Notes for the chart:

== Special cases ==
The genders of a few nouns are not fixed, and may be linked to regional or register differences. There are a number of words with two meanings distinguished by gender.

=== Compounds and abbreviations ===
Compound words usually carry the gender of their last element. Moreover, the gender of abbreviations is decided by the gender of the base word, and shortened words take the gender of the full word.

=== English loanwords ===
Many loanwords from English adopt the gender of their native German equivalent; the gender of other loanwords may be deduced by the word's form or ending. For example, nouns from English -ing forms are neuter when referring to actions, but masculine when not referring to actions e.g. der Looping, 'loop' esp. in context of a rollercoaster. Another source of neuter loanwords are adverbials like das Off.

=== Monosyllabic nouns from verbs ===
Monosyllabic nouns from verbs are often masculine, and the same goes for monosyllabic words for which there is no other indication, which are mainly masculine.

=== Varying gender ===
In many cases the gender can vary, either because of regional differences or because the noun's gender is not firmly established.

== Professions ==
Most job titles have both a masculine and feminine form that reflects the gender of the professional, similar to the English distinction between "waiter" and "waitress". Feminine job titles are usually created by adding -in to the grammatically masculine word in question. For example, the general grammatically masculine term for train driver is Lokführer (singular or plural). This yields the feminine form Lokführerin (plural: Lokführerinnen).

For job listings, if the generic masculine form is used, the Gesellschaft für deutsche Sprache recommends adding an explanatory note "(männlich/weiblich/divers)" or "(m/w/d)", indicating the role is open to persons of all genders.

In contrast, the German military does not have separate gendered ranks. Even though the grammatically female form of Arzt is Ärztin, the correct form of address for a female medical officer is "Frau Stabsarzt" and not "Frau Stabsärztin".

== See also ==
- German articles
- German cases
- German nouns
