= Lutherkirche =

Lutherkirche or Luther Church are common names for churches named after Martin Luther in German-speaking countries.

Churches named Lutherkirche include:

- Lutherkirche, Königsberg
- Lutherkirche, Wiesbaden
- a church in Apolda
- a church in Bad Harzburg
- a church in Cologne
- a church in Lübeck dedicated to the Lübeck martyrs
- a church in Montabaur
- a church in Schöneberg which hosts the American Church in Berlin
- a church in Schwarzheide
- a church in Tambach-Dietharz
- German name of Church of Luther, Riga
