= Muttiheft =

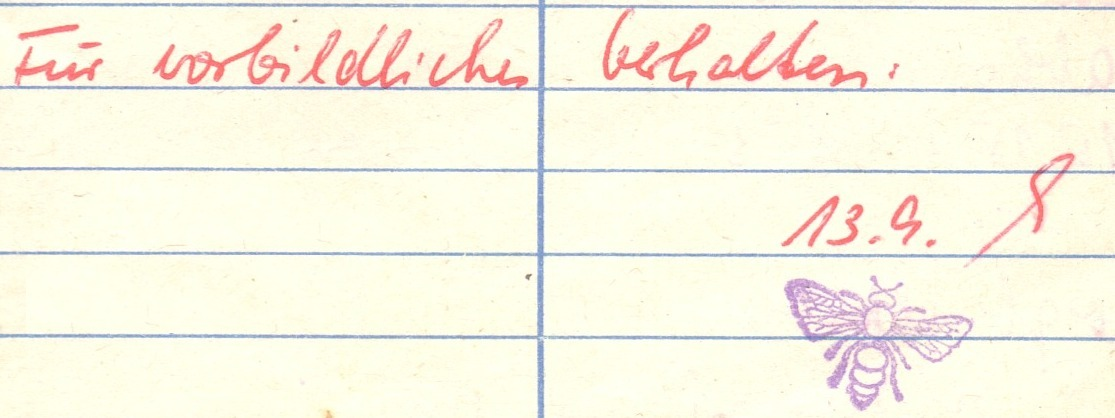
Entry in an East German Muttiheft with the reward of a "small bee" "for model behavior" ("für vorbildliches Verhalten") (1986)

Muttiheft (German for "Mommy notebook"; also Mitteilungsheft, Merkheft, Kommunikationsbuch, Verkehrsheft) is the colloquial term, sometimes ironically used, for a small notebook designed to facilitate communication between teachers and the parents of young students.

The term was most used in the period of Communist East Germany. Criticism, praise, rewards of merit (little rewards) (in the GDR called "little bees" or "Bienchen") were recorded in the books, and parents had to sign the reports to record their receipt of the information. The notebooks could also inform parents about the behavior of their children or about various events.

In more advanced grades, a homework notebook could have this communications functions, and it could be also jokingly referred to as a "Muttiheft."
