= Kriegsspiel (disambiguation) =

Kriegsspiel is a genre of wargaming developed by the Prussian army in the 19th century to teach tactics to officers.

Kriegsspiel or Kriegspiel may also refer to:

- Kriegspiel (chess), a chess variant of imperfect information
- Le Jeu de la Guerre, a wargame developed by Guy Debord, discussed in his 1987 book
- Kriegspiel (board wargame), an abstract board wargame developed by Avalon Hill in 1970
- "Kriegspiel", a song by Patrick Wolf from The Bachelor
