= Herrenhaus =

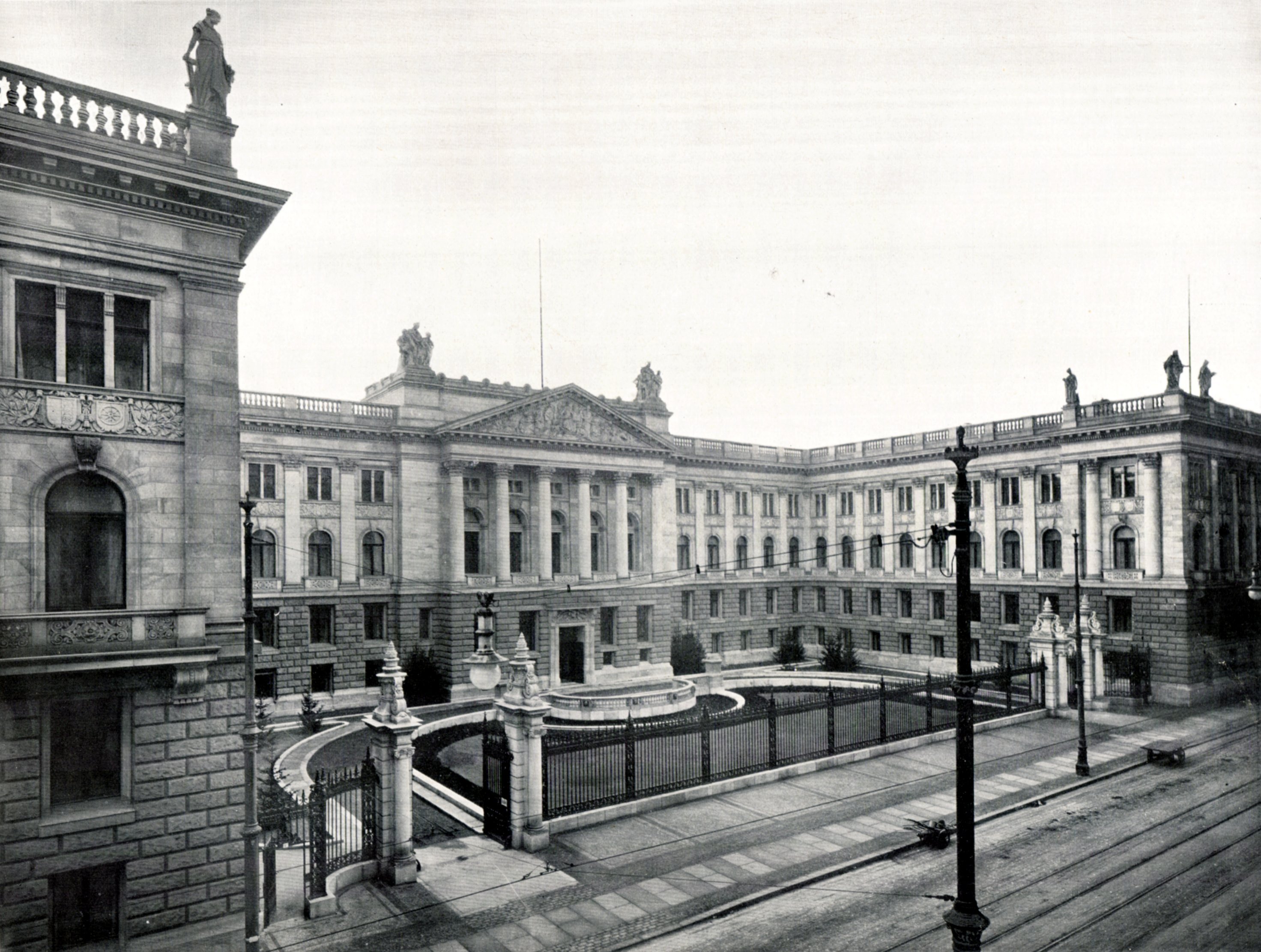
The Prussian House of Lords in Berlin (1900)

Herrenhaus (German, literally "House of Lords") may refer to:

- a manor house or mansion,
- the Prussian House of Lords,
- Österreichisches Herrenhaus, see House of Lords (Austria).

== See also ==
- House of Lords (disambiguation)
