= Oberteich =

Oberteich (German for Upper Pond) may refer to:

- German name for the Upper Pond (Kaliningrad), Russia
- German name of Stawnica, Warmian-Masurian Voivodeship, Poland
- pond in Schönberg, Mecklenburg-Vorpommern, Germany
- pond near Stendorfer See, Schleswig-Holstein, Germany
