= Dictionarium quatuor linguarum =

1592 book by Hieronymus Megiser

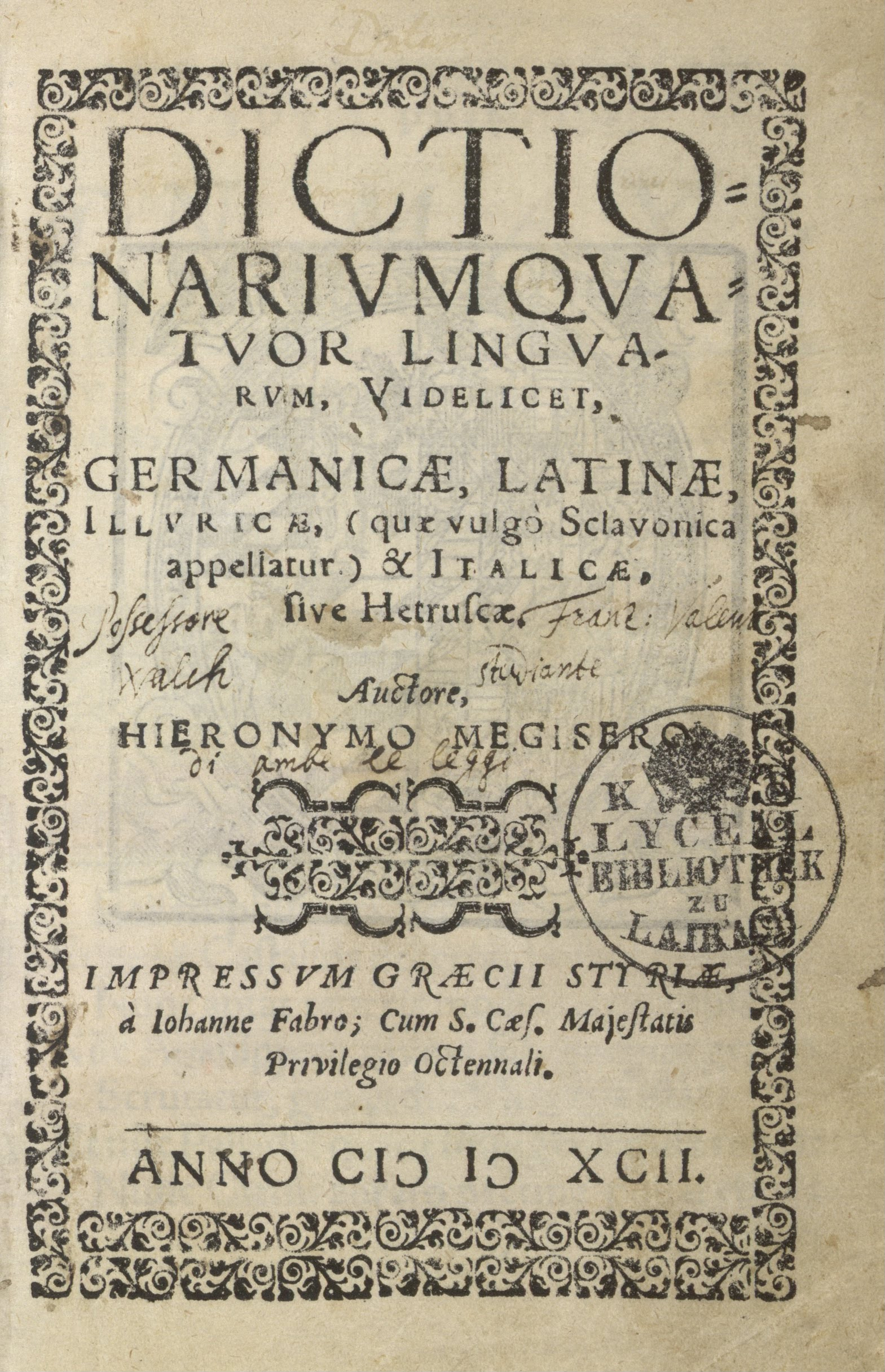
Dictionarium quatuor linguarum (1592). Front page.

Dictionarium quatuor linguarum (Note: Full name: Dictionarium quatuor linguarum videlicet, Germanicae, Latinae, Illyricae, (quae vulgo Sclavonica appellatur) & Italicae, sive Hetruscae.) (The Dictionary of Four Languages) is a 16th-century book by the German polymath Hieronymus Megiser that includes a multilingual dictionary and a multilingual grammar of Italian, Slovene, German, and Latin. It also includes some Croatian words. It was compiled and published in 1592 in Graz (Austria), then part of the Habsburg monarchy. The dictionary is the first multilingual dictionary of Slovene. The appendix, named Exempla aliquot declinationum et coniugationium (Some examples of declensions and conjugations) contains some grammar of the included languages and has been recognised as the second grammar of Slovene and the first multilingual grammar that includes Slovene. The book marks the beginning of Slovene lexicography. An extended edition was published under the same title in 1744 at Klagenfurt (Austria) by the Jesuits. This second edition also contains example phrases in German and Slovene, illustrating the use of the entries given. The number of Slovene equivalents in this edition is notably higher; they often reflect Carinthian Slovene.
