= Peter Honnen =

German linguist

- Born: 1954 (age 71–72)
- Occupation: Language researcher

Peter Honnen (born 1954) is a German linguist and specialist researcher of the languages of the Rhineland. He was born in Rheinhausen, Germany.

For years he worked as a scientific staff member at the section for language research of the Institute of Regional Studies and Regional History (German: Institut für Landeskunde und Regionalgeschichte) (formerly: Office of Rhinelandic Regional Studies, German: Amt für Rheinische Landeskunde – ARL) in Bonn-Endenich. The institute is run by the Landschaftsverband Rheinland (LVR), a body of municipal self-governance, the main seat of which is in Cologne-Deutz. Peter Honnen is the author or a coauthor of numerous books about the regiolect, the dialects, isolated languages, and special languages, such as cants, in the Rhineland. He contributed to the development of the Rheinische Dokumenta in the early 1980s. That is a simple phonetic script based on the Latin alphabet, specially suited for documenting the languages spoken locally inside the villages, towns, and quarters of the big cities of a wide region of Western Germany from the German lower Rhine area in the North to the Southern Palatinate in the South, and about. He has taken part in various publications about dialects in the Rhineland as a consultant. He was a corroborator, or the sole author, of more than 80 dictionaries of some Rhinelandic dialect versus Standard German. He is the head editor, and project leader, responsible for the Cooperative Dictionary of the Rhinelandic Colloquial Language, that the institute is collecting evidence with to research and document the newest developing features of the Rhinelandic Regiolect from a broad crowd of volunteer sources.

== Publications ==
Selected monographs:

- Alles Kokolores? - Wörter und Wortgeschichten aus dem Rheinland. Greven Verlag, Köln 2008, ISBN 978-3-7743-0418-5
- Kappes, Knies und Klüngel. Regionalwörterbuch des Rheinlandes. Greven Verlag, Köln 2003, ISBN 3-7743-0337-1
- Geheimsprachen im Rheinland. Eine Dokumentation der Rotwelschdialekte in Bell, Breyell, Kofferen, Neroth, Speicher und Stotzheim. — „Rheinische Mundarten“, Band 10, 2nd edition. Rheinland-Verlag, Köln 2000. With a compact disc. ISBN 3-7927-1728-X
- with Cornelia Forstreuter: Sprachinseln im Rheinland. Eine Dokumentation des Pfälzer Dialekts am unteren Niederrhein und des „Hötter Platt“ in Düsseldorf-Gerresheim. — „Rheinische Mundarten“, Band 7, Rheinland-Verlag, Köln 1994. With a compact disc. ISBN 3-7927-1456-6
- Ed. with Georg Cornelissen: Anlage einer Wortsammlung. Empfehlungen und Vorschläge für die Mundartdokumentation im Rheinland. Rheinland-Verlag, Köln 1986. 2nd edition 1991. ISBN 3-7927-0926-0
- together with Georg Cornelissen and Fritz Langensiepen (Editor): Das Rheinische Platt: Eine Bestandsaufnahme — „Rheinische Mundarten“, Volume 2. Rheinland-Verlag, Köln 1989, ISBN 3-7927-0689-X
- (presented after the initial work of Fritz Langensiepen) Rheinische Dokumenta: Lautschrift für Rheinische Mundarten, Mundartdokumentation im Rheinland. 2nd edition. Rheinland-Verlag, Köln 1987, ISBN 3-7927-0947-3
