= Bernese German phonology =

Bernese German, like other High Alemannic varieties, has a two-way contrast in plosives and fricatives that is not based on voicing, but on length. The absence of voice in plosives and fricatives is typical for all High German varieties, but many of them have no two-way contrast due to general lenition.

== Vowels ==
=== Monophthongs ===
Monophthong phonemes of Bernese German
	Front				Central		Back	
	unrounded		rounded		unrounded		rounded	
	short	long	short	long	short	long	short	long
Close	i	iː	y	yː			u	uː
Near-close	ɪ	ɪː	ʏ	ʏː			ʊ	ʊː
Mid	ɛ	ɛː	œ	œː	ə		ɔ	ɔː
Open	æ	æː			a	aː		

- /ɛ(ː), œ(ː), ɔ(ː)/ are true-mid [ɛ̝(ː), œ̝(ː), ɔ̝(ː)].
  - /ə/ occurs only in weak unstressed syllables.
- In northern Bernese German, /a/ is rounded to [ɒ] or even merges with /ɔ/ to [ɔ].

=== Vowel length ===
There is a distinctive length opposition in all vowels except [ə]. Unlike in standard German, there is no interdependence of vowel length and vowel quality.

=== Diphthongs ===
Bernese German has seven diphthong phonemes:

- Three closing diphthongs: /ɛi̯, œi̯, ɔu̯/
- Three opening diphthongs: /iə̯, yə̯, uə̯/
- One long diphthong: /aːu̯/

The number of phonetic diphthongs and triphthongs is significantly higher, since all monophthongs (except for short [i], [y], [u], [ə]) and all opening diphthongs may be followed by a [w] (from vocalized /l/), for instance /ˈʃtalː/ → [ˈʃtawː] ('stable'), /ˈʃtaːl/ → [ˈʃtaːw] ('steel'), /ˈkfyə̯l/ → [ˈkfyə̯w] ('feeling').

Additionally, there are certain combinations with [j], for instance [ˈmyə̯j] ('toil') or [ˈd̥ræːjt] ('turns' from [ˈd̥ræːjə] 'to turn').

In southern Bernese German (not in the city of Bern), the closing diphthongs /ɛi̯, œi̯, ɔu̯/ merge with the near-close monophthongs /ɪː, ʏː, ʊː/ to [ɪː, ʏː, ʊː], for instance [ˈɣ̊lɪːd̥] instead of [ˈɣ̊lɛi̯d̥] ('cloth'). This phenomenon is also found in the neighbouring Bernese Highlands and Sense District dialects.

In northern Bernese German, a following [w] triggers rounding of the preceding vowel, for instance [ʋʏw] instead of [ʋɪw] ('because'). This phenomenon is also found in the neighbouring Solothurn and Lucerne dialects.

== Consonants ==
Consonant phonemes of Bernese German
	Labial	Alveolar	Postalveolar	Dorsal	Glottal
Nasal	m – mː	n – nː		ŋ	
Stop	b̥ – p	d̥ – t		ɡ̊ – k	
Affricate	p͡f	t͡s	t͡ʃ	k͡x	
Fricative	v̥ – f	z̥ – s	ʒ̊ – ʃ	ɣ̊ – x	h
Approximant	ʋ	l – lː		j	
Trill		r			

- /m, p, b̥/ are bilabial, /p͡f/ is bilabial-labiodental, whereas /f, v̥, ʋ/ are labiodental.
- /l/ has a labialized velar allophone [w], see below.
- /r/ is usually alveolar [r], but in the old upper-class dialect of the patricians it is uvular [ʀ].
- /ŋ, k, ɡ̊/ are velar, whereas /j/ is palatal.
- /k͡x, x, ɣ̊/ vary between velar [k͡x, x, ɣ̊] and uvular [q͡χ, χ, ʁ̥].
- In addition to occurring on its own, [k͡x] may occur as a realization of the sequence /kh/.

=== Fortis and lenis consonants ===
Bernese German obstruents occur in pairs, as in other Alemannic varieties. These pairs are usually called fortis and lenis. They are not distinguished by voicedness, but they differ in length. A difference in tenseness is also discussed. It has not been established whether length or tenseness is the primary feature that distinguishes these pairs. Likewise, there are different possibilities of transcription. They are often transcribed with the IPA-signs for pairs of voiceless and voiced obstruents (for instance [p – b], [f – v]). In order to explicate that no voicedness is involved in the contrast, the diacritic for voicelessness may be used (for instance [p – b̥], [s – z̥]). Another possibility of transcription is the notation of the length, either with the IPA length sign (for instance [pː – p], [sː – s]) or with doubling (for instance [pp – p], [ss – s]). The opposition is only possible if the obstruents are surrounded by voiced sounds. If there is another adjacent voiceless sound (except [h]), then there is no opposition.

With the fricatives, the opposition does not occur at the beginning of a syllable. This is similar to the length opposition that occurs in the continuants [m n l]. With the stops, however, the opposition is not restricted with respect to syllable structure and also occurs in the syllable onset, for instance [ˈb̥axə] ('to bake') vs. [ˈpaxə] ('baked, past participle'); in order for this opposition not to be neutralized, there must be a preceding voiced sound, for instance [ɪ ˈʋɔt ə ˈɣ̊uəɣ̊ə ˈb̥axə] ('I want to bake a cake') vs. [ɪ ˈhan ə ˈɣ̊uəɣ̊ə ˈpaxə] ('I have baked a cake'). In the Northern Bernese German, however, only lenis plosives may occur at the syllable onset, so 'to bake' and 'baked (past participle)' are homophonous as [ˈb̥axə].

As in other Alemannic dialects, but unlike other Germanic languages, there is no interdependence of the length of a consonant with the length of the preceding vowel. Fortis consonants may occur after either long or short vowels, and lenis consonants as well:

Vowel quantity before fortis/lenis consonants
	short vowel		long vowel	
lenis consonant	[ˈɡ̊rad̥]	'just now'	[ˈɡ̊raːd̥]	'straight'
lenis consonant	[ˈɔv̥ə]	'oven'	[ˈɡ̊ɔːv̥ə]	'kids'
fortis consonant	[ˈʃtat]	'city'	[ˈʃtaːt]	'state'
fortis consonant	[ˈafə]	'apes'	[ˈʒ̊laːfə]	'to sleep'

=== Vocalization of /l/ ===
Long /lː/ is pronounced [wː], for instance /ˈb̥alːə/ → [ˈb̥awːə] ('ball'); /l/ at the end of a syllable [w], for instance /ˈɣ̊alt/ → [ɣ̊awt] ('cold').

This feature is absent in the old upper-class dialect of the patricians.

=== Velarization of /nd̥/ ===
/nd̥/ is pronounced [ŋː] in most cases, for instance /hʊnd̥/ → [hʊŋː] ('dog') or /ɣ̊ɪnd̥/ → [ɣ̊ɪŋː] ('child'). However, there are some words like [ʋɪnd̥] ('wind') or [v̥rʏnd̥] ('friend') in which /nd̥/ is not velarized.

This feature is absent in the old upper-class dialect of the patricians.

In the southwestern dialects of the Schwarzenburg area, it is pronounced [nː].

=== Reduction of /ŋk͡x/ ===
In the western and southern dialects (not in the city of Bern), /ŋk͡x/ is pronounced [jɣ̊], for instance /ˈd̥æŋk͡xə/ → [ˈd̥æjɣ̊ə] ('to think').

== Stress ==
In native words, the word stem is stressed, except verbs with a separable prefix where that prefix is stressed.

In loan words, there is – in comparison to standard German – a preference for initial stress, for instance Bernese German [ˈkaz̥inɔ] ('casino'), [ˈʒ̊alɛ(ː)] ('chalet') vs. standard German [kaˈziːno], [ʃaˈleː].

== Diachronics ==
=== Vowel lengthening and shortening ===
Like other High Alemannic varieties, Bernese German shows monosyllabic lengthening in comparison to Middle High German, in words such as [ˈb̥aːd̥] ('bath'), [ˈrɛːd̥] ('speech'). However, there is normally no open syllable lengthening, so the corresponding disyllabic words have a short vowel, such as [ˈb̥ad̥ə] ('to bathe'), [ˈrɛd̥ə] ('to speak'). Open syllable lengthening occurs only in a few cases, mainly before [l] and [r], for example [ˈv̥aːrə] ('to drive') or [ˈtæːlər] ('valleys').

A distinctive trait of Bernese German that sets it apart from other High Alemannic varieties is the occurrence of vowel shortening in comparison to Middle High German. This shortening applies most generally before [t] in words such as [ˈtsit] ('time') or [ˈlut] ('loud'). Before other consonants, it may be restricted to disyllabic words, for instance [ˈv̥inər] ('finer'), [ˈv̥ulə] ('to foul') as opposed to monosyllabic [v̥iːn] ('fine'), [v̥uː] ('foul') with an unshortened vowel.

In the close vowels, the shortened and lengthened vowels remain distinct from originally short and long vowels. This is why the distinction between close and near-close vowels is phonemic, even though the contrast has a low functional load, with only very few actual minimal pairs such as [ˈritər] ('rider', shortened vowel) vs. [ˈrɪtər] ('knight', originally short vowel) or [ˈtʏːrə] ('door', lengthened vowel) vs. [ˈtyːrə] ('to increase in price', originally long vowel).

== Literature ==
- Marti, Werner (1985), Berndeutsch-Grammatik, Bern: Francke, ISBN 3-7720-1587-5
