= Hammer's German Grammar and Usage =

English reference book on German grammar

- Cover page of the second edition
- Editor: Martin Durrell
- Publication date: 1971
- ISBN: 9781444120165

Hammer's German Grammar and Usage (ISBN 9781444120165) is an English reference book on German grammar.

The 1st edition was published in 1971. The 5th edition was written by Martin Durrell. A review of the 2nd edition noted that the book "continues to be the most accurate and complete reference grammar available for advanced English-speaking learners of German".
