= Multikulti =

Political slogan

Multikulti is a slogan of the multiculturalism public policy approach. Its etymological origin is with the German progressive movements of the 1970s and 1980s. It was popularised by the German Green Party and gained popularity throughout Europe.
