= German articles =

German articles are used similarly to the English articles, a and the. However, they are declined differently according to the number, gender and case of their nouns.

== Declension ==
The inflected forms depend on the number, the case and the gender of the corresponding noun. German articles – like adjectives and pronouns – have the same plural forms for all three genders.

=== Indefinite article ===
This article, ein-, is used equivalently to the word a in English. Like its English equivalent (though unlike Spanish), it has no direct form for a plural; in this situation a range of alternatives such as einige (some; several) or manche (some) would be used.

Indefinite article endings (mixed)
	Masculine	Feminine	Neuter	Plural
Nominative	ein	eine	ein	-
Accusative	einen	eine	ein	-
Dative	einem	einer	einem	-
Genitive	eines	einer	eines	-

The same endings are used for the negative indefinite article-like word (kein-), and the adjectival possessive pronouns (alias: possessive adjectives, possessive determiners), mein- (my), dein- (your (singular)), sein- (his), ihr- (her and their), unser- (our), euer/eur- (your (plural)), Ihr- (your if addressing an authority figure, always capitalised).

=== Definite article ===
This table gives endings for the definite article, equivalent to English the.

Definite article (strong)
	Masculine	Feminine	Neuter	Plural
Nominative	der	die	das	die
Accusative	den	die	das	die
Dative	dem	der	dem	den
Genitive	des	der	des	der

The so-called "der words" (Der-Wort) take similar endings. Examples are demonstrative pronouns (dies-, jen-) (this, that), the relative pronoun (welch-) (which), jed- (every), manch- (many), solch- (such).

Definite article-like endings (strong)
	Masculine	Feminine	Neuter	Plural
Nominative	-er	-e	-es	-e
Accusative	-en	-e	-es	-e
Dative	-em	-er	-em	-en
Genitive	-es	-er	-es	-er

- This is essentially the same as the indefinite article table, but with the masculine nominative -er, and the neuter nominative and accusative -es.

For further details as to the usage of German cases, see German grammar.
