= Hansaplatz =

Hansaplatz (German for "Hanseatic square") refers to:

- a square in Berlin
  - Hansaplatz (Berlin U-Bahn), station in Berlin
- a square in Cologne
- a square in Düsseldorf
- a square in Hamburg
- a square in Dortmund
- a square in Königsberg, now Victory Square, Kaliningrad
