= Kanne (surname) =

Kanne is a surname. Notable people with the surname include:

- Friedrich August Kanne (1778–1833), composer and music critic in Vienna
- Michael Stephen Kanne (1938-2022), American federal judge
- William R. Kanne (fl. 1940s), American physicist
