= Archaic Dutch declension =

The Dutch language in its modern form does not have grammatical cases, and nouns only have singular and plural forms. Many remnants of former case declensions remain in the Dutch language, but few of them are productive. One exception is the genitive case, which is still productive to a certain extent. Although in the spoken language the case system was probably in a state of collapse as early as the 16th century, cases were still prescribed in the written standard up to 1946/1947.

The declensions are still present in the sociolect known as "tale Kanaäns" (the language of Canaan), which is used by conservative, pietistic, Dutch Reformed Dutch speakers. This is because of the fact this sociolect takes a lot of influence from Early Modern Dutch, the language of the Statenvertaling and the oudvaders.

== Case usage ==
The four Dutch cases were the nominative, genitive, dative and accusative. They were still alive and in use in Middle Dutch, but they gradually fell out of use in early modern Dutch. Seventeenth-century grammarians and those that came after them attempted to keep the case system alive, and codified a written standard that included them. This standard was prescriptive—an attempt to influence how people wrote and spoke Dutch rather than to reflect how they already spoke naturally. It included not just the crumbling case system, but also a strict separation between masculine and feminine genders, falling out of use in some dialects as well.

By the 18th century, the everyday spoken language had lost its case system in most dialects, but it remained present in the written standard. Rules for the use of cases were relaxed in the Marchant spelling of 1934, and were finally abolished in the 1946/1947 spelling reform, along with many other archaic features. After the reform, the use of cases was discouraged, although they were still allowed by the standard. In modern Dutch, they are preserved in certain fixed expressions. They also continue to be used when writers want to make something sound deliberately archaic.

Only the nominative case or the accusative case survives in the modern spoken language (nominativism and accusativism respectively); which case survives depends on the dialect. In dialects with accusativism, the masculine and feminine genders remain distinct; in dialects with nominativism, they are merged. This is because in the older declension, the nominative was the same for the masculine and feminine gender, but the accusative forms differed:

- Nominativism: In spoken northern Dutch, as well as the modern written standard. Examples: de man, een man (the man, a man), de vrouw, een vrouw (the woman, a woman)
- Accusativism: In spoken southern Dutch (especially Brabantian in the Netherlands and Belgium). Examples: den/d'n man, ene(n)/'ne(n) man, de vrouw, een vrouw.

=== Nominative ===
In the older standard, the nominative (nominatief or eerste naamval) was used for the following:

- Subject: Ik ga naar school. (I go to school)
- Predicate nominative: Peter is piloot. (Peter is a pilot)

=== Genitive ===
The genitive (genitief or tweede naamval) was used in the following cases:

- Possession: des mans hoed (the man's hat), Peters vriend (Peter's friend)
- Relationship: Zoon des mensen (Son of man), het rijk der natuur (the realm of nature)
- Partitive: Eén der mensen ontbreekt. (One of the people is missing)
- Indicating time: 's maandags studeert ze aardrijkskunde (Mondays she studies geography)
- With certain adjectives, such as bewust, deelachtig, gedachtig, machtig, schuldig, waardig.
- As a complement of certain verbs, such as zich ontfermen, zich erbarmen, gedenken, zich herinneren, zich schamen.

Many of these uses are replaced by the preposition van in modern Dutch. A few cases use other prepositions.

- de hoed van de man
- het rijk van de natuur
- Eén hunner kon ontsnappen → Een van hen kon ontsnappen (One of them was able to escape)
- Ontferm u mijner → Ontferm u over mij (Have mercy on me)

The (possessive) genitives of the personal pronouns are replaced by the possessive pronouns.

- een vriend mijner (a friend of mine) → mijn vriend (my friend)

The possessive form of the genitive is still productive when used with proper names. This form does not resemble the old genitive, which was a full case and had distinctive endings on each word in a phrase. Instead, it is a possessive clitic much like in English, and attaches to the last word in the whole phrase. For example, "Jans auto" (John's car) is productive and in common usage. However, in some cases the old form is still productive to evoke a certain style: de generatie der babyboomers or to avoid using van too often: de wensen van de meerderheid der Nederlandse bevolking.

A partitive genitive form of the adjective is still used after words like iets, niets (something, nothing), e.g. iets nieuws (something new).

Gerunds can sometimes still be found in the genitive case in expressions involving tot ... toe: tot vervelens toe, (until boredom set in) tot bloedens toe (until bleeding occurred)

The genitive of time and the old form of the possessive genitive are nowadays still used in quite a lot of more or less "frozen" forms: des daags (by day), des nachts or 's nachts (by night), 's ochtends (in the morning), 's avonds (in the evening), 's-Gravenhage, 's-Hertogenbosch, 's-Gravenbrakel, 's-Hertogenrade (place names), etc.

=== Dative ===
The dative (datief or derde naamval) was used in the following cases:

- Indirect object: Hij gaf hun het boek (He gave them the book)
- After the preposition te: ter plekke (on site), ten einde (at the end)
- After prepositions with a figurative meaning: in den beginne (at the beginning)

In modern Dutch, the dative case is technically still required after the preposition te (to). However, this preposition itself has fallen out of use, and is found only in fixed expressions. These expressions tend to keep the original dative form. For example, ten slotte 'finally', te allen tijde 'at all times'. It is also used somewhat productively for placenames without any case marking. For example, Het Rijksmuseum te Amsterdam 'The National Museum in Amsterdam'. Even this is still dated to some degree.

Gerunds in -ing (which are feminine) can still be combined with ter (e.g. ter herdenking 'to commemorate') and enjoy a modicum of productivity, like ter wikifiëring 'to be wikified', which is certainly acceptable Dutch.

=== Accusative ===
The accusative (accusatief or vierde naamval) was used in the following cases:

- Direct object: Jij sloeg mij (You hit me)
- Object of a preposition other than te: door mij (by me), bij hen (at their place)

The accusative case was left for objects of transitive verbs and objects of all prepositions except for te. However, as distinctions between the grammatical cases were only weakly felt among speakers of Dutch, the feminine and neuter declensions were identical in the nominative and accusative, and the masculine declension was identical for the accusative and dative, endless confusion reigned.

== Articles ==
=== Definite article ===
	Singular			Plural
	Masculine	Feminine	Neuter	All
Nominative	de		het ('t)	de
Genitive	des ('s)	der	des ('s)	der
Dative	den (d'n)	der	den (d'n)	
Accusative	den (d'n)	de	het ('t)	de

The forms in brackets are shortened forms that were occasionally used. They were somewhat colloquial.

- des morgens → 's morgens (in the morning)
- het paard → 't paard (the horse)

The preposition te contracts with a following definite article: te den → ten, te der → ter. Compare this to German zum, zur.

- te der plaatse → ter plaatse (on the spot, on site, at the scene)
- te den tijde → ten tijde (at the time)

=== Indefinite article ===
	Masculine	Feminine	Neuter
Nominative	een ('n)	een ('n), ene ('ne)	een ('n)
Genitive	eens ('ns)	ener	eens ('ns)
Dative	enen ('nen)	ener	enen ('nen)
Accusative	enen ('nen)	een ('n), ene ('ne)	een ('n)

Because Dutch had many spelling reforms, some forms had different spellings in the past. The stem was formerly spelled een- regardless of the ending, so eenen, eener etc. The modern spelling, given in the table, are written according to the rules of modern Dutch orthography.

The forms in brackets are shortened forms that were occasionally used. As with the shortenings of the definite article, these are colloquial.

- een paard → 'n paard (a horse)
- een koning → 'ne koning (a king)
- eens konings → 'ns konings (a king's)
- enen koning → 'nen koning (a king)

== Nouns ==
A distinction was made between strong and weak declensions. The weak declension had most cases with the ending -en in the singular, while the strong declension had other endings. This distinction was not as important in 19th century standard Dutch as it was in earlier Old and Middle Dutch. The two types were much more distinct in Old and Middle Dutch, but gradually became mixed together. The older strong plural forms disappeared so that all nouns became weak in the plural. In the singular the opposite happened: the weak declension was replaced with the strong declension in most nouns. The difference was then only relevant for the singular, the plural was the same for all nouns.

The older standards of Dutch maintained a strict separation between the masculine, feminine and neuter gender. While this is not significant in the modern language without cases, it was important in the older standard because the masculine and feminine nouns declined rather differently. Masculine and neuter nouns declined the same, and were usually strong, with some nouns retaining the weak declension. Feminine nouns declined differently, and there was no strong-versus-weak distinction for them.

Because the difference between masculine and feminine was disappearing or had already disappeared in the spoken language, some nouns tended to mix masculine and feminine endings. One will come across fixed expressions such as te zijner tijd (feminine dative singular) alongside destijds (masculine genitive singular). This confusion was largely eliminated when cases were abolished, but on the occasion that cases are used in modern Dutch, this confusion is very frequent in areas where the spoken language has only a single "common" gender. Thus, masculine and feminine case endings, when used nowadays, may be almost interchangeable.

=== Masculine and neuter nouns ===
The following declension was used for most masculine and neuter nouns. It had also come to be used for female proper names, but normal feminine nouns used a separate declension, seen further below.

==== Strong nouns ====
	Singular	Plural
Nominative	man	mannen
Genitive	mans	mannen
Dative	manne/man	mannen
Accusative	man	mannen

	Singular	Plural
Nominative	veld	velden
Genitive	velds	velden
Dative	velde/veld	velden
Accusative	veld	velden

Most nouns had -s in the genitive singular. This was extended to -es when it would have caused an awkward-to-pronounce combination of sounds otherwise (huis, gen. sg. huizes), but it was also used occasionally for nouns that did not require it. If the noun ended with a long vowel, then an apostrophe was included as in modern usage.

The -e of the dative singular was frequently dropped.

Some masculine and neuter nouns became feminine in the dative singular. See below under "mixed nouns".

The plural could end in either -en or -s. A few had plurals in -eren (kind, pl. kinderen). This is the same as in modern Dutch.

==== Weak nouns ====
Some nouns retained a weak genitive in the singular, including nouns with a nominative sg. in -e and substantivised adjectives. Examples are mens (man), bode (courier), and dappere ("brave one").

	Singular	Plural
Nominative	mens	mensen
Genitive	mensen	mensen
Dative	mense/mens	mensen
Accusative	mens	mensen

	Singular	Plural
Nominative	bode	boden
Genitive	boden	boden
Dative	bode	boden
Accusative	bode	boden

	Singular	Plural
Nominative	dappere	dapperen
Genitive	dapperen	dapperen
Dative	dappere	dapperen
Accusative	dappere	dapperen

Many of the weak nouns were words for people, including bediende (servant) graaf (count), heer (lord), hertog (duke), knaap (lad), prins (prince), vorst (prince). Hart (heart) belongs to the same group (but see below).

Some relics remain of the weak declension in modern Dutch. The cities of 's-Gravenhage and 's-Hertogenbosch both still show the original weak genitive ending in their names. The Christian expression dag des Heren (day of the Lord) also retains it.

=== Feminine nouns ===
Feminine nouns had a simpler declension. When separate endings were used, the genitive and dative singular forms would end in -e. Female proper names did not follow this declension, but were declined as strong masculine/neuter nouns instead.

	Singular	Plural
Nominative	vrouw	vrouwen
Genitive	vrouwe/vrouw	vrouwen
Dative	vrouwe/vrouw	vrouwen
Accusative	vrouw	vrouwen

=== Mixed nouns ===
Some nouns mixed several types of declension. The most common irregularity was a feminine dative singular replacing the masculine or neuter one.

- hart (heart) was a weak neuter noun, but was feminine in the dative singular: der harte
- oor (ear) was a strong neuter, feminine in the dative singular: der ore
- uur (hour) was a strong neuter, feminine in the genitive and dative singular: der ure
- gunst (favour) was a strong masculine noun, feminine in the genitive and dative singular: der gunste
- tijd (time) was a strong masculine, but alternatively feminine in the genitive and dative singular: der tijd alongside des tijds/den tijde
- wereld (world) was a strong masculine, alternatively feminine in the genitive singular: der wereld alongside des werelds

== Adjectives ==
The older standard distinguished between predicative and attributive adjectives, much as the modern standard. It also distinguished definite and indefinite declensions. However, the difference was three-way rather than two-way:

- Weak declension: Preceded by a definite word. Example: de goede man (the good man).
- Mixed declension: Preceded by an indefinite word. Example: een goede man (a good man).
- Strong declension: Not preceded by any word. Example: goede man (good man).

This distinction still exists in modern German. In modern Dutch, the mixed and strong declensions have fallen together, becoming the indefinite declension, while the weak declension remains as the definite declension.

Adjectives ending in -en (e.g. houten, koperen) did not receive any endings, like in modern Dutch.

=== Weak declension ===
	Singular			Plural
	Masculine	Feminine	Neuter	All
Nominative	de goede man	de goede vrouw	het goede/goed kind	de goede mannen, vrouwen, kinderen
Genitive	des goeden mans	der goede vrouwe/vrouw	des goeden kinds	der goede mannen, vrouwen, kinderen
Dative	den goeden manne/man	der goede vrouwe/vrouw	den goeden kinde/kind	den goeden mannen, vrouwen, kinderen
Accusative	den goeden man	de goede vrouw	het goede/goed kind	de goede mannen, vrouwen, kinderen

=== Mixed declension ===
	Singular			Plural
	Masculine	Feminine	Neuter	All
Nominative	een goede man	een/ene goede vrouw	een goed kind	vele goede mannen/vrouwen/kinderen
Genitive	eens goeden mans	ener goede vrouwe/vrouw	eens goeden kinds	veler goede mannen, vrouwen, kinderen
Dative	een/enen goeden manne/man	ener goede vrouwe/vrouw	een/enen goeden kinde/kind	velen goeden mannen, vrouwen, kinderen
Accusative	een/enen goeden man	een/ene goede vrouw	een goed kind	vele goede mannen, vrouwen, kinderen

The masculine and feminine endings in -en and -e of the indefinite article were frequently dropped even in written language. However, the endings in -en and -e of een, geen, mijn, uw, zijn, hun, and haar were strictly maintained in government and administrative documents until 1946/7.

=== Strong declension ===
	Singular			Plural
	Masculine	Feminine	Neuter	All
Nominative	goede man	goede vrouw	goed kind	goede mannen, vrouwen, kinderen
Genitive	goeden mans	goeder vrouwe/vrouw	goeden kinds	goeder mannen, vrouwen, kinderen
Dative	goeden manne/man	goeder vrouwe/vrouw	goeden kinde/kind	goeden mannen, vrouwen, kinderen
Accusative	goeden man	goede vrouw	goed kind	goede mannen, vrouwen, kinderen

There also was a special vocative form for the neuter singular: Lieve kind (Sweet child). However, this form was not widely accepted, and the nominative was used instead.

== Pronouns and determiners ==
Most pronouns and determiners followed the strong adjective declension. Some pronouns (such as iemand, iets, elkaar) declined as nouns and had only -s in the genitive but no endings otherwise. Those that were irregular in some way are given here.

=== Personal pronouns ===
Uniquely, modern Dutch retains the use of cases in the personal pronouns. The older forms were the same as the modern ones, with the modern object form used for both the dative and accusative, and the subject form for the nominative. For the genitive, the possessive determiners (which were fully inflected, see below) were used, but there were also special pronoun forms which used the genitive form of the possessive (ending -er).

An exception was the third-person plural. The standard prescribed that hen was the accusative form, while hun was the dative.

=== Possessive determiners ===
The possessive determiners declined like strong adjectives. In modern Dutch, they do not decline at all, except for ons.

Like in modern Dutch, a different declension was used when the possessives were used as nouns. This declension resembled the strong declension of nouns in the singular, but with an extra -e added in many cases. In the plural, the strong adjective declension was used, but the neuter nominative/accusative had only -e, not -en.

	Singular			Plural
	Masculine	Feminine	Neuter	All
Nominative	de mijne		het mijne	de mijne(n)
Genitive	des mijns	der mijne	des mijns	der mijner
Dative	den mijne	der mijne	den mijne	den mijnen
Accusative	den mijne	de mijne	het mijne	de mijne(n)

=== Demonstratives ===
The proximal pronoun deze:

	Singular			Plural
	Masculine	Feminine	Neuter	All
Nominative	deze		dit	deze
Genitive	dezes	dezer	dezes	dezer
Dative	dezen	dezer	dezen	
Accusative	dezen	deze	dit	deze

The distal pronoun die:

	Singular			Plural
	Masculine	Feminine	Neuter	All
Nominative	die		dat	die
Genitive	diens	dier	diens	dier
Dative	dien	dier	dien	
Accusative	dien	die	dat	die

The interrogative pronoun wie (who) declined the same way.

== Historical overview ==
Dutch has retained some vestiges of the original case system, more so than English, but to a much lesser extent than German. In contemporary language, nouns and articles are no longer inflected for case, although an elaborate case system was used in the written language until the middle of the 20th century. Many surnames, toponyms and set expressions still exhibit fossilised inflected forms of the article and noun.

=== Middle Ages ===
In Middle Dutch, a productive case system was still in existence, which was very similar to that of modern German. Given below is the so-called "strong" inflection.
(adjective clein = small, noun worm = worm, daet = deed/action, broot = (loaf of) bread)

Case	Masculine		Feminine		Neuter	
Number	singular	plural	singular	plural	singular	plural
Nominative	die cleine worm	die cleine worme	die cleine daet	die cleine dade	dat cleine broot	die cleine brode
Accusative	den cleinen worm	die clene worme	die cleine daet	die cleine dade	dat cleine broot	die cleine brode
Genitive	des cleins worms	der cleiner worme	der cleiner daet	der cleiner dade	des cleins broots	der cleiner brode
Dative	den cleinen worme	den cleinen wormen	der cleiner daet	den cleinen daden	den cleinen brode	den cleinen broden

=== 16th to 18th centuries ===
It was already observed in the 15th century that there existed no distinction between the nominative and accusative forms of nouns and articles in the northern dialects. From the Renaissance onward, the view that the Dutch language should somehow be 'ennobled' with an extensive case system after the model of Latin was widespread. Hendrik Louwerisz. Spieghel, an influential 16th-century grammarian, tried to reform and standardize the Dutch case system in his book on grammar, Twe-spraack van de Nederduitsche Letterkunst [Dialogue on the Low German art of letters] (1584). In particular, Spieghel wanted to create a distinction in grammatical function between two existing forms of the definite article, de and den, having de pertain to subjects and den to objects. (In this system, no distinction was made between masculine and feminine nouns, as was later done; des vrouws, den vrouwe (f) would stand alongside des heers, den here (m).) Another artificial distinction, still in use today, between the plural personal pronouns hun (for the indirect object) and hen (for the direct object) was created by Christiaen van Heule, who wrote De Nederduytsche spraec-konst ofte tael-beschrijvinghe [The Low German speech-art or language-description] (printed in 1633). In the same vein, the distinction between masculine and feminine nouns was rigidly maintained, although this distinction was felt only vaguely at best in the northern dialects. (In the dialects of the Southern Netherlands, however, the distinction did indeed exist and is still in existence today.) Celebrated poets such as Joost van den Vondel and Pieter Cornelisz. Hooft often disagreed in assigning gender to nouns, which they arbitrarily based on equivalents in Latin, German, or other languages whenever they saw fit. Their choices were adopted by the grammarian David van Hoogstraten in his Aenmerkingen over de Geslachten der Zelfstandige Naemwoorden [Comments on the genders of the independent nouns] (1700); where Vondel and Hooft disagreed, Van Hoogstraten would assign a gender to a noun by his own choice. These "gender lists" were steadily extended, especially by professor Adriaan Kluit (1735–1807), who revised Van Hoogstraten's work. Kluit's list formed the basis of later 19th-and early 20th-century practice.

=== 19th and early 20th centuries ===
This artificial approach to the Dutch language remained the prevailing practice through the 17th and 18th centuries, but attitudes began to change in the 19th century. The rigidity of the written language was satirized in 1865 by Jacob van Lennep in his De vermakelijke spraakkunst [The amusing art of language], in which he noticed that the case system was hardly used in spoken language. The practice of approaching Dutch as if it were a classical, inflecting language comparable to Latin and Greek (or German) was gradually abandoned in the 19th century, and it was recognized that word order played a far greater role in defining grammatical relationships. R. A. Kollewijn (1857–1942) advocated spelling reforms for the whole of the Dutch language, at a time when a rather extensive case system was maintained in the written language by the De Vries–Te Winkel spelling. The table below shows the conventions of the written language in the late 19th and early 20th centuries. Only the "strong" inflection is shown here.

Case	Masculine	Feminine	Neuter
Nominative (sg.)	de kleine worm	de kleine daad	het kleine brood
Genitive (sg.)	des kleinen worms	der kleine daad	des kleinen broods
Dative (sg.)	den kleinen worm	de kleine daad	het kleine brood
Accusative (sg.)	den kleinen worm	de kleine daad	het kleine brood
Nominative (pl.)	de kleine wormen	de kleine daden	de kleine broden
Genitive (pl.)	der kleine wormen	der kleine daden	der kleine broden
Dative (pl.)	den kleinen wormen	den kleinen daden	den kleinen broden
Accusative (pl.)	de kleine wormen	de kleine daden	de kleine broden

=== Later 20th century to present ===
Some of Kollewijn's proposals for a simplified spelling, including the effective abandonment of the case system, were adopted by Minister of Education Marchant for use at schools in 1934, which meant that the case endings were no longer taught at school. Kollewijn's spelling was officially implemented by the Belgian and Dutch governments in 1946 and 1947 respectively.

Since 1946/1947, only one form is used for all cases, and the only remaining distinction is the one between singular and plural. The -n has been lost in adjective nouns.

Number \ Gender	Masculine	Feminine	Neuter
Singular	de kleine worm	de kleine daad	het kleine brood
Plural	de kleine wormen	de kleine daden	de kleine broden

Numerous remnants of the old system remain in the language, usually on the level of individual idioms, but there are larger issues. One part of the legacy involved the formation of compounds, like bijenkorf (beehive). In modern Dutch the two parts of a compound are typically linked by either -e-, -en- or -s- and historically these linkers descend from the genitive endings of the old case system. Particularly the question when to use -e- or -en- became a source of a plethora of spelling errors, because the system that produced the forms was no longer understood. In 1995 and 2006 spelling changes were adopted that introduced new rules that abandoned any relationship with the historical development of the word.

== See also ==
- Dutch grammar
- Dutch orthography

== Sampling ==
From the Dutch language Wikipedia:

- nl:Datief
- nl:Accusatief
- nl:Vormen van verkleinwoord in het Nederlands
- nl:Verkleinwoord
- nl:Trappen van vergelijking
- nl:Aanwijzend voornaamwoord

== Bibliography ==
- Johann Franz Ahn, (1796–1865) Elements of Dutch grammar, after Dr. Ahn's method (The Hague, Nijhoff, 1871)
- W. Bilderdijk, Nederlandsche spraakleer (The Hague, 1826)
- W.G. Brill, Nederlandsche spraakleer. Deel I. Klankleer, woordvorming, aard en verbuiging der woorden (4th edition, Leiden, 1871)
- J.M. Hoogvliet Elements of Dutch grammar, 4th edition (The Hague, Nijhoff, 1908) Here it is already stated the declension is archaic in nature.
