= Königstrasse =

Königstrasse or Königstraße is the German word for "King Street".

Things named Königstrasse include:

- Königstrasse (Königsberg)
- Königstrasse station, Hamburg
- Königstraße (Stuttgart), main shopping street of Stuttgart, Germany
