= Simon Heinrich Adolf Herling =

Simon Heinrich Adolf Herling (13 October 1780 in Detmold – 1 April 1849 in Frankfurt am Main) was a German philologist and grammarian known for his scholastic treatment of German syntax.

== Career ==
From 1801 to 1804, he studied theology at the University of Göttingen, afterwards spending several years as a private tutor in Frankfurt am Main. From 1809 to 1849, he worked as an instructor at the gymnasium in Frankfurt, and in the meantime served as a professor of classical languages at the Frankfurt Lyceum (1811–14). He was a founding member (1817) and president of the Frankfurtischen Gelehrtenvereins für Deutsche Sprache.

== Works ==
Along with philologist Karl Ferdinand Becker, Herling is considered to be a primary representative of the so-called school of "rational grammar" in Germany. His principal writings are:

- Ueber die Topik der deutschen Sprache, 1821 – The topic of German language.
- Grundregeln des deutschen Stils oder der Periodenbau der deutschen Sprache. Ein Lehrbuch für den stilistischen Unterricht, 1823 (Google). Later editions as 2nd part of Die Syntax der deutschen Sprache.
- Die Syntax der deutschen Sprache – German language syntax.
  - 1st part, 1830 (Google)
  - 2nd part also named Grundregeln des deutschen Styls, oder der Periodenbau der deutschen Sprache: 2nd ed. 1827 (Google), 3rd ed. 1832 (Google, Google)
- Erster Cursus eines wissenschaftlichen Unterrichts in der deutschen Sprache für Deutsche, 1828 (Google)
- Theoretisch-praktisches Lehrbuch der Stylistik für obere Classen höherer Schulanstalten und zum Selbstunterricht, 1837, 1st part (Google), 2nd part (Google) – Textbook of stylistics.
- Vergleichende Darstellung der Lehre vom Tempus und Modus. Ein Beitrag zur einfachern und richtigern Behandlung dieser Lehre in den Grammatiken der griechischen, deutschen, lateinischen, französischen und hebräischen Sprache, 1840 (Google) – Comparative studies on the doctrines of tense and mode.

Herling was also the author of several treatises with mathematical and theological themes.
