= Gesamtbedeutung =

Linguistic concept of general meaning

Gesamtbedeutung (German for "general meaning", German pronunciation: [ɡəˈzamtbəˌdɔʏtʊŋ]), in linguistics, is the general meaning of the various uses of a morphological element. The Gesamtbedeutung of a language's past tense, for instance, might be conceived as "distance from the present". This meaning might later be generalized to refer to events both temporally distant (e.g. the box was empty) as well as separated in terms of reality or likelihood (e.g. the box might be empty, if the box were empty..., the box could be empty, etc.)

In Japanese, for example, the tense system has been reduced to a system of "past", "non-past", and "probable". The last two tenses share the Gesamtbedeutung of abstraction from the real. The past tense refers to events which are complete and definite, and the non-past refers to virtually everything else, including present and future events. The probable tense functions in much the same way as the non-past but with a stronger sense of separation from the present reality.

For another example, the English word endings "-ing" and "-er" share a Gesamtbedeutung of agency (as opposed to that of patienthood, which is represented by such morphemes as "-ed" and "-ee"). One who is driving is, by definition, a driver. Though differing in grammatical function, both morphemes share a common Gesamtbedeutung.
