= Ruhrdeutsch =

Area where Ruhr German is spoken in Germany.

Ruhrdeutsch (Ruhr German; also: Ruhrgebietsdeutsch, Ruhrpottdeutsch, Ruhrpottisch, Ruhrpöttisch) is a regiolect of German spoken in the Ruhr area. Through immigration, its vocabulary has been influenced by Low Franconian, Westphalian and Ripuarian dialects as well as from Eastern German dialects, Polish, Yiddish, and various sociolects ("slang").
