= Cooperative Dictionary of the Rhinelandic Colloquial Language =

German dictionary

The Cooperative Dictionary of the Rhinelandic Colloquial Language (Mitmachwörterbuch der rheinischen Umgangssprache) was a website that both documents and collects data on the current distinct variety of German used colloquially in the Rhineland region - where some 15 million speakers live.

It is run by the Landschaftsverband Rheinland (LVR), a public body of municipal self governance of the Rhineland in West of North Rhine-Westphalia in Western Germany, under the auspices of the Bureau of Research and Documentation of the Rhineland (Amt für rheinische Landeskunde); and is the first of its kind - replacing interviews with individual speakers, or questionnaires, by an interactive web application quasi anonymously collecting scientific evidence about a contemporary language.

The Project started the interactive World Wide Web site towards the end of February 2007.

== Website ==
The cooperative dictionary website has several pages describing what it is all about, how to use it, and such. It has an editorial-like "featured word of the month" series of articles which is added to every six or seven weeks. Its main areas are:

1. Read (German: Lesen) – allows reading the dictionary pretty much like a printed copy. Page layout resembles print. Catchwords are sorted alphabetically. Related words appear under their associated main catchwords. Each initial letter starts another page, only page size exceeds normal sheet length by far, meanwhile.
2. Page (German: Blättern) – The paging function permits access to individual words through a set of keyword lists, each covering a portion of the alphabet. Keywords link to the individual pages on words in the format, that also the search function presents.
3. Search (German: Suchen) – There is a simple and a slightly more sophisticated search form, supporting limited fuzziness and wildcards. They usually yield two word lists of links to pages on individual words. One list has catchwords only, the other occurrences in sample sentences presented with arbitrary catchwords. Any such word page presents the data already collected and edited for the word, and, usually, related words, and sample sentences demonstrating its use in everyday colloquial speech. After that, there is a form, where additional comments can be made by users. Submitted comments appear on the page at once, they are visible for everyone. Editors incorporate comments into word articles every now and then, and delete comments that are done.
4. Contribute (German: Mitmachen) – Missing words, expressions or phrase constructs, as well as any sort of information, can be entered into an online form here. Along with the submitters e-mail address (optional) and town, city or region (optional), everything is sent per e-mail to the team of editors. Submissions are usually integrated into the dictionary within several weeks.

Participants are asked to submit words, and sample sentences. Optionally, they should also enter their regional background, e.g. the town or village where they live, or the region within which a word or expression is being used. They are under no obligation to do so, but they can enter their names for publication, and e-mail addresses, which are always kept confidential and not published. There is no login and no identity check. False impersonations are generally possible, but pretty pointless. The list of contributors having agreed to have their names mentioned grew from none to about 600 in the 1st half year once the website was online. Submissions take several days to weeks, occasionally months, to be incorporated in the dictionary by the editors who read, filter, and process them.

Even though the cooperative dictionary conceptually builds upon volunteer contributions, it is not a commonplace Web 2.0 type of website, since there is a board of editors collecting and condensing contributions, and editing them, before they get published. The project in a way works similar to the most popular German Duden editors, who are watching and observing the use of written Standard German, reporting their findings in the form of a printed dictionary. The cooperative dictionary only focuses on the spoken language, and on a much smaller region, so instead of new books, magazines, and papers, they evaluate voluntary statements of speakers about their everydays colloquial language use.

== Subject of research and methods of assessment ==
Subject matter of research and documentation is the spoken colloquial language of the Rhineland.

The definition of Rhineland thereby includes the Lower Rhine region of Germany, the Ruhr Area, the Bergisches Land, the so-called Central Rhineland around the big cities Aachen, Bonn, Cologne, Düsseldorf, the more rural Eifel and Hunsrück regions, plus some small stripes alongside the borders. This coincides approximately with the North and Central of the former Rhine Province of the former Prussian reign. Its northern areas are covered by the more modern term of Meuse-Rhine area.

The term colloquial language does explicitly not mean the many local languages, which in Germany commonly are referred to as "dialects", even if they still dominate everydays communication here and there. It rather means a common regional colloquial language, also termed a Regiolect, which has developed very recently as a kind of dachsprache enveloping the older local languages. It is more or less influenced by the so-called dialects, but in itself a variant of Standard German or High German, which incorporates several mild, globalized and unified localisms. It does have subregional variations itself, but these are less, and almost always ubiquitously comprehended, as opposed to the local languages, which are far more diverse, and most often largely mutually incomprehensible, when geographically somewhat distant.

Regiolect speakers very often are not aware that their spoken language, and its use, deviate quite a lot and to a large extent from Standard German. Only a part of the Rhinelanders consciously reflect what those differences are. Contributions show that likely this relatively small group tends to make submissions to the Cooperative Dictionary project. This may lead to questions about the methodical rigor of the project. Similarly, documenting a spoken language with currently only written evidence created by people who are not educated in this field, using an undocumented unstandardized writing system, is posing questions. The currently used writing style is not well suited to document most of those deviations from Standard German, in the realm of accent and prosody at large, such as type A prosody, melody of speech, phonetic intonation, word accent, rhythm, tonal or pitch accents or tonal intonation, timbre and vocal colors, and so on.

Orthography is mainly left to the contributors. Editors at best only slightly unify writing in sample sentences. Thus orthography reflects both individual preferences and to some extent regional differentiation of speech and intonation, too. Also linguistic registers can show this way.

Currently, the Cooperative Dictionary does not use sound recordings.

== Scientific background ==
In its scientific work of the past, the linguistic section of the ALR, first under Dr. Fritz Langensiepen, later under Dr. Georg Cornelissen, originally mainly researched the local languages, which are collectively called "dialects" in Germany. Since the 1970s they put an additional focus on the supra-dialectal regional language variety and colloquial language of the Rhineland. These, after World War II, had gradually begun to replace the older local languages (dialects) in large areas causing a notable shift of everydays spoken language. In order to research and document the colloquial language of the Rhineland in various publications, regular polls were made over the years, always asking for both specific and more general linguistic information on language use from a large number of volunteers via pre-compiled questionnaires focusing of varying types of information. So, among many others tasks, new maps of word use could be drawn and published, and both stability, and movement, of several isoglosses could be shown. In part, research results were published on the ARLs website, too.

The Cooperative Dictionary is the first attempt to replace, or supplement, such scientific polls of a larger number of volunteers by an ongoing monitoring and surveillance of linguistic evidence. The makers hope to increase the number of individuals in their probe while at the same time, since data is being collected electronically from the very beginning, decrease labour and manual work needed for data entry and, in part, analysis, compared to the previous, predominantly paper based work.

There are no published indications regarding the quality of the data collected anonymously over the internet. Editor Dr. Peter Honnen points out that past observations of wikis dedicated to collect information of a specific kind, such as Wikipedia, and Wiktionary, in part helped the Cooperative Dictionary of the Rhinelandic Colloquial Language on its way by proving that useful data could be collected cooperatively in the internet. Also reception of the publications of the linguistics section of the Amt für Rheinische Landeskunde on the web, and the growing number of Rhinelanders participating in polls sending their questionnaires by e-mail did lend themselves to support an online project.
