= German declension =

Inflection of nouns, adjectives, etc. in German

German declension is the paradigm that German uses to define all the ways articles, adjectives and sometimes nouns can change their form to reflect their role in the sentence: subject, object, etc. Declension allows speakers to mark a difference between subjects, direct objects, indirect objects and possessives by changing the form of the word—and/or its associated article—instead of indicating this meaning through word order or prepositions (e.g. English, Spanish, French). As a result, German can take a much more fluid approach to word order without the meaning being obscured. In English, a simple sentence must be written in strict word order (ex. A man eats an apple). This sentence cannot be expressed in any other word order than how it is written here without changing the meaning. A translation of the same sentence from German to English would appear rather different (ex. Ein Mann isst einen Apfel (a man)-subject eats (an apple)-direct object) and can be expressed with a variety of word order (ex. Einen Apfel isst ein Mann (an apple)-direct object is eaten by (a man)-subject) with little or no change in meaning.

As a fusional language, German marks nouns, pronouns, articles, and adjectives to distinguish case, number, and gender. For example, all German adjectives have several different forms. The adjective neu 'new', for example, can be written in five different ways (neue, neuer, neues, neuen, neuem) depending on the gender of the noun that it modifies, whether the noun is singular or plural, and the role of the noun in the sentence. English lacks such declensions (except for rare and exceptional ones, such as blond/blonde) so that adjectives take only one form, or in the case of pronouns, such as I, me, my, mine, she, her, etc., which show the remnants of nominative, accusative, and genitive case markings.

Modern High German distinguishes between four cases—nominative, accusative, genitive, and dative—and three grammatical genders—feminine, masculine, and neuter. Nouns may also be either singular or plural; in the plural, one declension is used regardless of gender – meaning that plural can be treated as a fourth "gender" for the purposes of declining articles and adjectives. However, the nouns themselves retain several ways of forming plurals which often, but not always, correspond with the word's gender and structure in the singular. For example, many feminine nouns which, in the singular, end in e, like die Reise 'the journey', form the plural by adding -n: die Reisen 'the journeys'. Many neuter or masculine nouns ending in a consonant, like das Blatt 'the leaf' or der Baum 'the tree', form plurals by a change of vowel and appending -er or -e: die Blätter and die Bäume ('the leaves', 'the trees'). Historically, these and several further plural inflections recall the noun declension classes of Proto-Germanic, but in much reduced form.

== Articles ==
=== Definite article ===
The definite articles (der, die, etc.) correspond to the English "the".

	Masculine	Feminine	Neuter	Plural
Nominative	der	die	das	die
Accusative	den	die	das	die
Dative	dem	der	dem	den
Genitive	des	der	des	der

=== Indefinite article ===
The indefinite articles (ein, eine, etc.) correspond to English "a", "an". Note: ein is also a numeral which corresponds to English "one" (i.e. 1).

Ein has no plural; as in English, the plural indefinite article is null, as in "There are cows in the field" (Es gibt Kühe auf dem Felde). Instead, the declension of the pronoun kein ('no, not any, not one') is given, which follows the plural paradigm.

	Masculine	Feminine	Neuter	Plural*
Nominative	ein	eine	ein	keine
Accusative	einen	eine	ein	keine
Dative	einem	einer	einem	keinen
Genitive	eines	einer	eines	keiner

== Adjectival pronouns ==
Certain adjectival pronouns also decline like der: all-, dies-, jed-, jen-, manch-, solch-, welch-. These are called der-words (Der-Wort).

The general declension pattern is as shown in the following table:

	Masculine	Feminine	Neuter	Plural
Nominative	-er	-e	-es	-e
Accusative	-en	-e	-es	-e
Dative	-em	-er	-em	-en
Genitive	-es	-er	-es	-er

Examples:

	Masculine	Feminine	Neuter	Plural
Nominative	dieser	diese	dieses	diese
Accusative	diesen	diese	dieses	diese
Dative	diesem	dieser	diesem	diesen
Genitive	dieses	dieser	dieses	dieser

Case	jeder (singular)			alle (plural)
Case	Masculine	Feminine	Neuter	alle (plural)
Nominative	jeder	jede	jedes	alle
Accusative	jeden	jede	jedes	alle
Dative	jedem	jeder	jedem	allen
Genitive	jedes	jeder	jedes	aller

Adjectival possessive pronouns (or possessive determiners) and kein decline similarly to the article ein. The general declension pattern is as shown in the following table:

	Masculine	Feminine	Neuter	Plural
Nominative	–	-e	–	-e
Accusative	-en	-e	–	-e
Dative	-em	-er	-em	-en
Genitive	-es	-er	-es	-er

Examples:

	Masculine	Feminine	Neuter	Plural
Nominative	kein	keine	kein	keine
Accusative	keinen	keine	kein	keine
Dative	keinem	keiner	keinem	keinen
Genitive	keines	keiner	keines	keiner

	Masculine	Feminine	Neuter	Plural
Nominative	dein	deine	dein	deine
Accusative	deinen	deine	dein	deine
Dative	deinem	deiner	deinem	deinen
Genitive	deines	deiner	deines	deiner

	Masculine	Feminine	Neuter	Plural
Nominative	ihr	ihre	ihr	ihre
Accusative	ihren	ihre	ihr	ihre
Dative	ihrem	ihrer	ihrem	ihren
Genitive	ihres	ihrer	ihres	ihrer

	Masculine	Feminine	Neuter	Plural
Nominative	euer	eure	euer	eure
Accusative	euren	eure	euer	eure
Dative	eurem	eurer	eurem	euren
Genitive	eures	eurer	eures	eurer

Euer is slightly irregular: when it has an ending, its stem may be reduced to eur-, e.g. dative masculine eurem (also euerem).

== Nouns ==
Only the following nouns are declined according to case:

- Masculine weak nouns gain an -n (sometimes -en) at the end in cases other than the singular nominative. e.g., der Student, des Studenten.
- A handful of masculine "mixed" nouns, the most common of which is der Name (the name), gain an -ns at the end in the singular genitive, e.g. der Name, des Namens, and otherwise behave exactly like weak nouns.
- The genitive case of other nouns of masculine or neuter gender is formed by adding either -s or -es, e.g. das Bild, des Bildes.
- Nouns in plural that do not already end in -n or -s (the latter mostly found in loanwords) gain an -n in the dative case. e.g. der Berg, die Berge, den Bergen. Most of these nouns are either masculine or neuter, but there is a group of feminine nouns that are declined in this way too. While this group comprises only a small minority of feminine nouns, it includes some of the most oft-used nouns in the language. e.g. die Hand, die Hände, den Händen.
- The irregular neuter noun das Herz behaves almost exactly like the masculine "mixed" nouns, except that it is not inflected in the singular accusative and inflection in the singular dative is optional especially in spoken German, e.g. das Herz, das Herz, dem Herzen or dem Herz, des Herzens.

There is a dative singular marking -e associated with strong masculine or neuter nouns, e.g. der Tod and das Bad, but this is rarely regarded as a required ending in contemporary usage, with the exception of fossilized phrases, such as zum Tode verurteilt ('sentenced to death'), or titles of creative works, e.g. Venus im Bade ('Venus in the Bath'): In these cases, the omission of the ending would be unusual. It also retains a certain level of productivity in poetry and music where it may be used to help with meter and rhyme, as well as in extremely elevated prose (such as might be found on memorial plaques).

== Pronouns ==
=== Personal pronouns ===
The genitive case for personal pronouns is currently considered archaic and is used only in certain archaic expressions like ich bedarf seiner ('I need him'). This is not to be confused with possessive adjectives.

Nominative	Accusative	Dative	Genitive
ich – I	mich – me	mir – to/for me	meiner – of me
du – you (familiar singular)	dich – you	dir – to/for you	deiner – of you
er – he	ihn – him	ihm – to/for him	seiner – of him
sie – she	sie – her	ihr – to/for her	ihrer – of her
es – it	es – it	ihm – to/for it	seiner – of it
wir – we	uns – us	uns – to/for us	unser – of us
ihr – you (familiar plural)	euch – you	euch – to/for you	euer – of you
Sie – you (formal singular and plural)	Sie – you	Ihnen – to/for you	Ihrer – of you
sie – they	sie – them	ihnen – to/for them	ihrer – of them

Note that unlike in English, er and sie can refer to any masculine or feminine noun, not just persons, while es can refer to a person described by a neuter noun: das Kind, es...; das Mädchen, es...

=== Interrogative pronouns ===
	Nominative	Accusative	Dative	Genitive
Personal ("who/whom")	wer	wen	wem	wessen
Impersonal ("what")	was	was	^{−}	^{−}

1. Generally, prepositions that need to be followed by either case merge with was to form new words such as wovon ('whereof'), woher ('whence', 'from where'), weswegen ('for what reason').

=== Relative pronouns ===
	Masculine	Feminine	Neuter	Plural
Nominative	der	die	das	die
Accusative	den	die	das	die
Dative	dem	der	dem	denen
Genitive	dessen	deren	dessen	deren

	Masculine	Feminine	Neuter	Plural
Nominative	welcher	welche	welches	welche
Accusative	welchen	welche	welches	welche
Dative	welchem	welcher	welchem	welchen
Genitive	welches	welcher	welches	welcher

=== Possessive pronouns ===
Possessive pronouns are treated as articles in German and decline the same way as kein; see Indefinite article above.

=== Demonstrative pronouns ===
These may be used in place of personal pronouns to provide emphasis, as in the sentence "Den sehe ich" ("I see that"). Also note the word ordering: den corresponds to "that", and ich corresponds to "I". Placing the object at the beginning of the sentence places emphasis on it. English, as a generally non-declined language, does not normally show similar behavior, although it is sometimes possible to place the object at the front of a sentence for similar emphasis, as in: "Him I see, but I don't see John".

The table is the same as for relative pronouns.

=== Reflexive pronouns ===
Reflexive pronouns are used when a subject and object are the same, as in Ich wasche mich 'I wash myself'.

Nominative (Subject)	Accusative (Direct Object)	Dative (Indirect Object)
ich – I	mich – myself	mir – to/for myself
du – you	dich – yourself	dir – to/for yourself
er/sie/es/man – he/she/it/one	sich – himself/herself/itself/oneself	sich – to/for himself/herself/itself/oneself
wir – we	uns – ourselves	uns – to/for ourselves
ihr – you (pl.)	euch – yourselves	euch – to/for yourselves
Sie – you (formal)	sich – yourself/yourselves	sich – to/for yourself/yourselves
sie – they	sich – themselves	sich – to/for themselves

=== Indefinite pronouns ===
The pronoun man refers to a generic person, and is usually translated as one (or generic you). It is equivalent to the French pronoun on.

Nominative	Accusative	Dative	Genitive
man – one/you/they	einen – one/you/them	einem – to/for one/you/them	sein – one's/your/their

== Adjectives ==
=== Predicate adjectives ===
Predicate adjectives (e.g., kalt in mir ist kalt 'I am cold' are undeclined.

=== Attributive adjectives ===
==== Strong inflection ====
Strong adjective declension is used when:

- there is no preceding article; or
- the preceding article does not fully indicate the case, gender, and number of the noun.

	Masculine	Feminine	Neuter	Plural
Nominative	-er	-e	-es	-e
Accusative	-en	-e	-es	-e
Dative	-em	-er	-em	-en
Genitive	-en	-er	-en	-er

Here is an example.

	Masculine	Feminine	Neuter	Plural
Nominative	schwieriger Fall	rote Tinte	schönes Haus	alkoholfreie Getränke
Accusative	schwierigen Fall	rote Tinte	schönes Haus	alkoholfreie Getränke
Dative	schwierigem Fall(e)	roter Tinte	schönem Haus(e)	alkoholfreien Getränken
Genitive	schwierigen Fall(e)s	roter Tinte	schönen Hauses	alkoholfreier Getränke

Note that the ending for genitive masculine and neuter is -en. This is a source of confusion for learners, who typically assume it is -es, and also native speakers, who interpret the pronouns called der-words (Der-Wort), for example jed-, as adjectives with no article, to be declined strongly.

==== Weak inflection ====
Weak adjective declension is used when the article itself clearly indicates case, gender, and number.

	Masculine	Feminine	Neuter	Plural
Nominative	-e	-e	-e	-en
Accusative	-en	-e	-e	-en
Dative	-en	-en	-en	-en
Genitive	-en	-en	-en	-en

	Masculine	Feminine	Neuter	Plural
Nom.	welcher schwierige Fall	solche rote Tinte	dieses schöne Haus	alle alkoholfreien Getränke
Acc.	welchen schwierigen Fall	solche rote Tinte	dieses schöne Haus	alle alkoholfreien Getränke
Dat.	welchem schwierigen Fall(e)	solcher roten Tinte	diesem schönen Haus(e)	allen alkoholfreien Getränken
Gen.	welches schwierigen Fall(e)s	solcher roten Tinte	dieses schönen Hauses	aller alkoholfreien Getränke

==== Mixed inflection ====
Mixed adjective declension is used when there is a preceding indefinite article (e.g. ein-, kein-), or possessive determiner (mein-, dein-, ihr-, etc.). It is like the weak inflection, but in forms where the weak inflection has the ending -e, the mixed inflection replaces these with the forms of the strong inflection (shown in grey).

	Masculine	Feminine	Neuter	Plural
Nominative	-er	-e	-es	-en
Accusative	-en	-e	-es	-en
Dative	-en	-en	-en	-en
Genitive	-en	-en	-en	-en

	Masculine	Feminine	Neuter	Plural
Nominative	mein schwieriger Fall	seine rote Tinte	euer schönes Haus	keine alkoholfreien Getränke
Accusative	meinen schwierigen Fall	seine rote Tinte	euer schönes Haus	keine alkoholfreien Getränke
Dative	meinem schwierigen Fall(e)	seiner roten Tinte	eurem schönen Haus(e)	keinen alkoholfreien Getränken
Genitive	meines schwierigen Fall(e)s	seiner roten Tinte	eures schönen Hauses	keiner alkoholfreien Getränke

== Undeclined geographic attributive words ==
Many German locality names have an attributive word associated with them which ends in -er, for example Berliner for Berlin and Hamburger for Hamburg, which are not marked for case but always end in -er. Die Berliner Mauer (‘the Berlin Wall’) and das Brandenburger Tor (‘the Brandenburg Gate’) are prominent examples of this. Note the -er ending despite the neuter gender of the word Tor. If the place name ends in -en, like Göttingen, the -er usually replaces the terminal -en.

== See also ==
- Archaic Dutch declension
