= List of countries and territories where German is an official language =

Legal status of German language: German is an official language. German is a co-official language. Squares: German (or a variety of German) is a legally recognized minority language. Solid: Statutory national or cultural language. German is a cultural language.

Approximate distribution of native German speakers (assuming a rounded total of 95 million) worldwide:
1. Germany (78.3%)
2. Austria (8.40%)
3. Switzerland (5.60%)
4. Brazil (3.20%)
5. Italy (0.40%)
6. Others (4.10%)

The following is a list of the countries and territories where German is an official language (also known as the Germanosphere). It includes countries that have German as (one of) their nationwide official language(s), as well as dependent territories with German as a co-official language.

All countries and territories where German has some officiality are located in Europe.

== German as an official language ==
German is the official language of six countries, all of which lie in central and western Europe. These countries (with the addition of South Tyrol of Italy) also form the Council for German Orthography and are referred to as the German Sprachraum (German language area). Since 2004, Meetings of German-speaking countries have been held annually with six participants: Germany, Austria, Belgium, Liechtenstein, Luxembourg, and Switzerland:

Country	Population	Speakers		Notes
Country	Population	Native	Second	Notes
Germany	84,607,016	75,101,421 (88.8%)	5,600,000 (6.6%)	De facto sole nationwide official language (Note: While several specific laws, e.g., §23 VwVfG or $184 GVG, specify German as the administrative language in Germany, the Grundgesetz does not specifically mention it as federal official language.)
Belgium	11,810,018	73,000 (0.6%)	2,472,746 (20.9%)	Co-official federal language, as well as the sole official language in the German-speaking Community
Austria	9,154,514	8,040,960 (87.8%)	516,000 (5.6%)	De jure sole nationwide official language
Switzerland	8,931,306	5,329,393 (59.7%)	395,000 (4.4%)	Co-official language at federal level; de jure sole official language in 17, co-official in 4 cantons (out of 26)
Luxembourg	672,050	11,000 (1.6%)	380,000 (56.5%)	De jure nationwide co-official language
Liechtenstein	39,724	32,075 (80.7%)	5,200 (13.1%)	De jure sole nationwide official language
Total	115,203,387	87,875,432	9,368,947	Total speakers: 97,244,379

=== Subdivisions of countries ===
While not official at the national level, German is a co-official language in subdivisions of the countries listed below. In each of these regions, German is an official language on the administrative level.

Region	Country	Population 2006/2011	Native speakers	Notes
Autonomous Province of South Tyrol	Italy	511,750	354,643 (69.3%)	Co-official language on province level; equal to Italian
Opole Voivodeship (28 communes); Silesian Voivodeship (3 communes)	Poland	250,000	~50,000 (~20%)	Auxiliary language in 31 communes; also national minority language

== Other legal statuses ==
There are other political entities (countries as well as dependent entities) which acknowledge other legal statuses for the German language or one of its dialects. While these may cover minority rights, support of certain language facilities (schools, media, etc.), and the promotion of cultural protection/heritage, they do not encompass the establishment of German as an "official" language, i.e., being required in public offices or administrative texts.

These countries include:

- Brazil (German is a statewide cultural language in Espírito Santo and Rio Grande do Sul; Standard German official in 2 municipalities and non-standard German dialects official in 16 others)
- Czech Republic (national minority language)
- Denmark (minority language in Syddanmark, established with the Bonn-Copenhagen declarations, 1955)
- Hungary (national minority language)
- Namibia (national language; co-official language 1884–1990)
- Poland (national minority language; also auxiliary language in 31 communes)
- Romania (national minority language)
- Russia (minority language in the Azovo German National District)
- Slovakia (regional minority language)

Although in France, the High German varieties of Alsatian and Moselle Franconian are identified as "regional languages" according to the European Charter for Regional or Minority Languages of 1998, the French government has not yet ratified the treaty, and therefore those varieties have no official legal status.

Due to the German diaspora, many other countries with sizable populations of (mostly bilingual) German L1 speakers include Argentina, Australia, Bolivia, Canada, Chile, Peru, Paraguay, as well as the United States. However, in none of these countries does German or a German variety have any legal status.

Section 6 (5) (b) of the Constitution of the Republic of South Africa, 1996 acknowledges German as a language commonly used by communities in South Africa though not being an official language.

== International institutions ==
German is an official language of the following international institutions:

Organisation	Number of official languages	Headquarters
European Patent Organisation	3 (English, French)	Munich, Germany
Unified Patent Court	3 (English, French)	Paris, France
European Space Agency	3 (English, French)	Paris, France
European Union	24	Brussels, Belgium
European Commission	3 (English, French)	Brussels, Belgium
Organization for Security and Co-operation in Europe	6 (English, French, Italian, Russian, Spanish)	Vienna, Austria
International Union of Railways	3 (English, French)	Paris, France
European Centre for Medium-Range Weather Forecasts	3 (English, French)	Reading, UK
International Trade Union Confederation	4 (English, French, Spanish)	Brussels, Belgium
World Association of Newspapers and News Publishers	4 (English, French, Spanish)	Frankfurt, Germany
Danube Commission	3 (French, Russian)	Budapest, Hungary
European Investment Bank	3 (English, French)	Kirchberg, Luxembourg
European Bank for Reconstruction and Development	4 (English, French, Russian)	London, UK
Permanent Committee on Geographical Names	1	Frankfurt am Main, Germany

- International sports associations:
  - European Handball Federation (EHF)
  - Fédération Internationale de Bobsleigh et de Tobogganing (FIBT)
  - Fédération Internationale de Football Association (FIFA)
  - Fédération Internationale de Luge de Course (FIL)
  - Fédération Internationale de Ski (FIS)
  - International Biathlon Union (IBU)
  - Union of European Football Associations (UEFA)

== See also ==
- German language in the Basic Law
- Distribution of German diasporas
- Germanic languages
- Geographical distribution of German speakers
- Unserdeutsch
- Geolinguistics
- Language geography

== Notes ==
By ISO 639-3 code
Enter an ISO code to find the corresponding language article.
