= Am-progressive =

Type of progressive aspect in colloquial German

The am-progressive (German: Am-Progressiv) is a type of progressive aspect (German: Verlaufsform) in German grammar which uses the auxiliary verb sein (to be). For instance, instead of saying ich arbeite gerade (lit. 'I am working'), some regional dialects use the construction ich bin am Arbeiten (lit. 'I am on the work') in order to emphasise the continuous nature of the action. The use of the am-progressive is considered colloquial, and is proscribed in the education system.

The progressive with am is used most often in the Rhinelandic, West German, and Swiss dialects of German. Originally it was believed that the construction originated in West Germany, because of which it has also been called the Rhenish progressive, Ruhr progressive, and Westphalian progressive. However, these names may be misleading because the construction has been observed across West Germany, Switzerland, and beyond.

== Occurrence ==
In the regions where it originated, the am-progressive is used not only in regional dialects but also in colloquial speech. Modified forms, for example, ich bin grad einen Brief am Schreiben dran (lit. 'right now I'm writing a letter') are mainly used in the Ruhr dialect and occur less frequently in other areas where the am-progressive is used. Over time, the colloquial use of this progressive tense has expanded throughout the German-speaking region.

According to Duden, the progressive is "somewhat viewed as standard speech already". Surveys conducted by Flick, Kuhmichel, and other linguists have also documented its occurrence in journalistic language. Despite its growing use in colloquial contexts and its general intelligibility in everyday speech, the am-progressive remains ungrammatical in formal education and is often proscribed alongside other common colloquialisms such as ans and überm.

The use of the am-progressive across a Satzklammer, where the two verbs sandwich the rest of the sentence, is more firmly restricted to the areas where the construction was originally attested, the Rhineland and Westphalia, as well as in Switzerland. A sentence such as Ich kann nicht ans Telefon kommen, ich bin gerade den Rasenmäher am Reparieren (lit. 'I can't get the phone, I'm repairing the lawn mower') would be extremely unlikely in Saxony or Austria, but used commonly in Ruhr or Zürich. The Atlas zurdeutschen Alltagssprache (Atlas of Everyday German) therefore suggests that the spread of the am-progressive is biphasic: the intransitive form spreads before the transitive form.

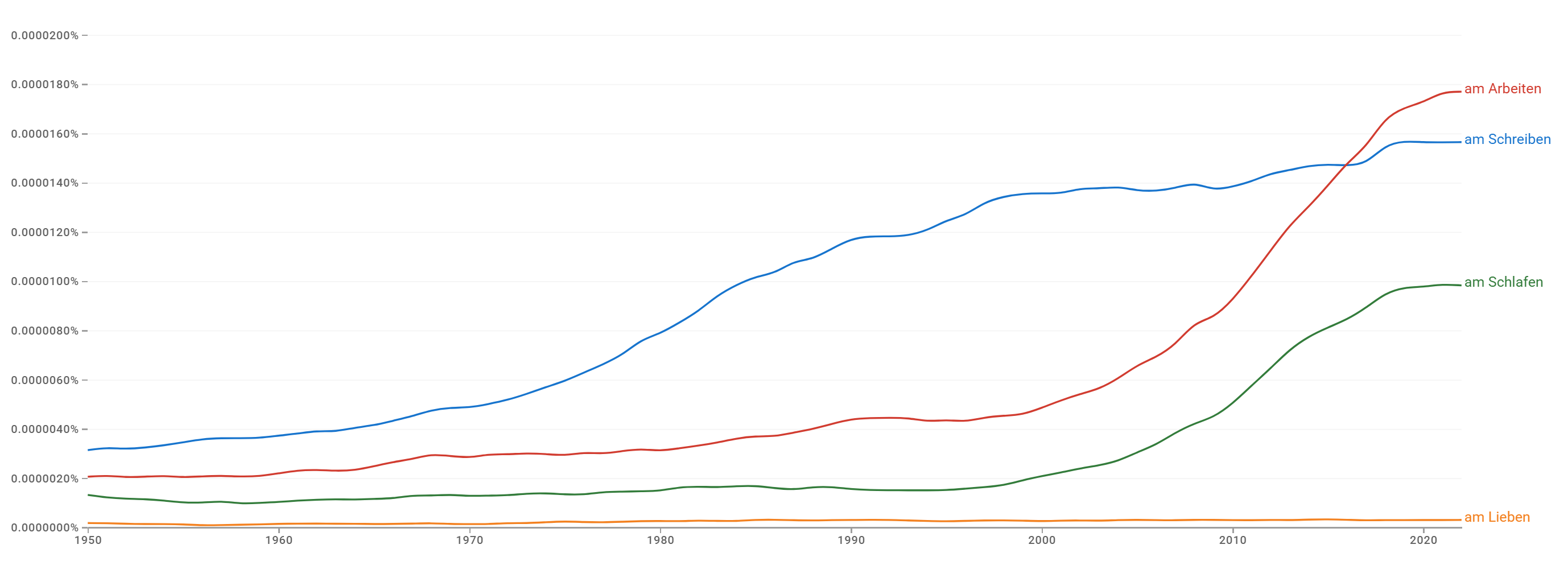
A Google Ngram graph showing the relative use of "am Arbeiten", "am Schlafen", "am Schreiben", and "am Lieben" in the period 1950–2022. There is a stark increase in the first three due to their use in progressives, but not in "am Lieben", because "I am loving..." does not make sense.

=== Construction ===
In German, the nominalised infinitive is the same as the verb (but capitalised because it is a noun), and is always neuter, so lachen (to laugh) would become am Lachen and weinen (to cry) would become am Weinen; the word am comes from an + dem, and although this contraction only applies to masculine and neuter nouns, it always works in the progressive because the nominalised infinitives are always neuter. Sentences in the progressive form usually still use the word gerade, or its colloquial form grad, to mean 'right now', as well as the verb construction.

In German, verbs are always lowercase and nouns are always uppercase, so am Lesen would suggest that the progressive is being constructed with a noun (the nominalised infinitive) but am lesen would suggest the progressive is being constructed with a verb. Note that despite the verb sein always taking the nominative in German, and thus the object of the sentence logically being in the nominative case, the case in the progressive form is aligned with the case taken by the progressive verb, hence ich bin einen Brief am Schreiben and not ich bin ein Brief am Schreiben.

For verb phrases which contain a noun (e.g. einen Apfel schälen – to peel an apple), the noun is contained within the am-progressive clause (e.g. er ist gerade am Apfel schälen – he's peeling an apple right now); the construction with the object before the am (e.g. er ist gerade Apfel am schälen) is significantly rarer in all places and limited almost exclusively to North Rhine-Westphalia. In order to form the progressive in different tenses, the auxiliary sein is always affected and never the verb in the progressive form:

- He is writing a letter – er ist grad einen Brief am Schreiben (present)
- He was writing a letter – er war grad einen Brief am Schreiben (preterite)
- He has been writing a letter – er ist grad einen Brief am Schreiben gewesen (perfect)
- He had been writing a letter – er war grad einen Brief am Schreiben gewesen (pluperfect)
- He will be writing a letter – er wird grad einen Brief am Schreiben sein (future)
- He will be writing a letter – er wird grad einen Brief am Schreiben gewesen sein (future perfect)

Note that the past forms of the progressive take sein as an auxiliary verb instead of haben, which is why it is er ist instead of er hat for the perfect and er war instead of er hatte for the pluperfect.

Examples of German progressive forms
Indicative	Ich schreibe einen Brief I write a letter
With grad	Ich schreibe grad einen Brief I'm writing a letter
With am	Ich bin einen Brief am Schreiben I'm writing a letter right now
With beim	Ich bin einen Brief beim Schreiben I'm writing a letter right now
With tun	Ich tue Briefe schreiben I do write letters.

=== Similar progressive constructions ===
The Ripuarian language and some Low Franconian languages make use of a further progressive form constructed using tun (to do), in the same way as English emphasis (e.g. "I do brush my teeth"). In the Colognian dialect, for example, you can say Dä deijt do wunne (Standard German: Der tut da wohnen; English: He does live there) to mean that it is certain and permanent that someone is living there. In contrast, Dä eß do am Wunne (Standard German: Der ist da am Wohnen; English: He's living there right now) could mean that someone is living there temporarily, such as if they were on holiday. The construction with tun has started being used in more standard forms of colloquial German, but is much rarer and more dialectal than the construction using sein.

In Austria, the published standard instead uses the word beim (ich bin beim Arbeiten; lit. 'I am at the work'), but a growing proportion of speakers use am instead. Some people consider beim to be a less formal construction of the progressive than am, and Bastian Sick reported in 2005 that beim was more common as an informal progressive. He also describes beim as inappropriate for some verbs, such as lieben (to love), but that am can be used colloquially with those verbs.

A similar progressive construction can be found in Dutch using aan het + Verb and is generally acceptable there. Duplicate forms of am also exist in the Eschweiler dialect, which is a Ripuarian dialect.

== Spelling controversy ==
The question of how to spell the verb component in the progressive is currently still in dispute, primarily whether it should be ich bin am Arbeiten or ich bin am arbeiten. Duden argued in its 2009 edition that the word is casually used as a verb, not a noun. As of 2023, the entry on the word am in the online edition of Duden describes the am-progressive as colloquial, and suggests, in contrast to its earlier print edition, that it should be used with capitalised verb forms (i.e. nominalised infinitives). The German-language expert Gabriella Gárgyán argued in her 2010 dissertation that so-called progressive verbs were a new verb class, because the verb has a distinct function to an infinitive and therefore she makes the case for it being spelled lowercase.

Alternatively it is sometimes viewed that am is a fourth verb state alongside the infinitive, zu-infinitive, and past participle, and that the am-infinitive is only to be used with sein. Evidence from the internet has also shown that the lowercase spelling (i.e. the infinitive) is also generally acceptable.

== See also ==
- German grammar
- German conjugation
- Continuous and progressive aspects
