= His genitive =

English construction used in the 16th–17th centuries

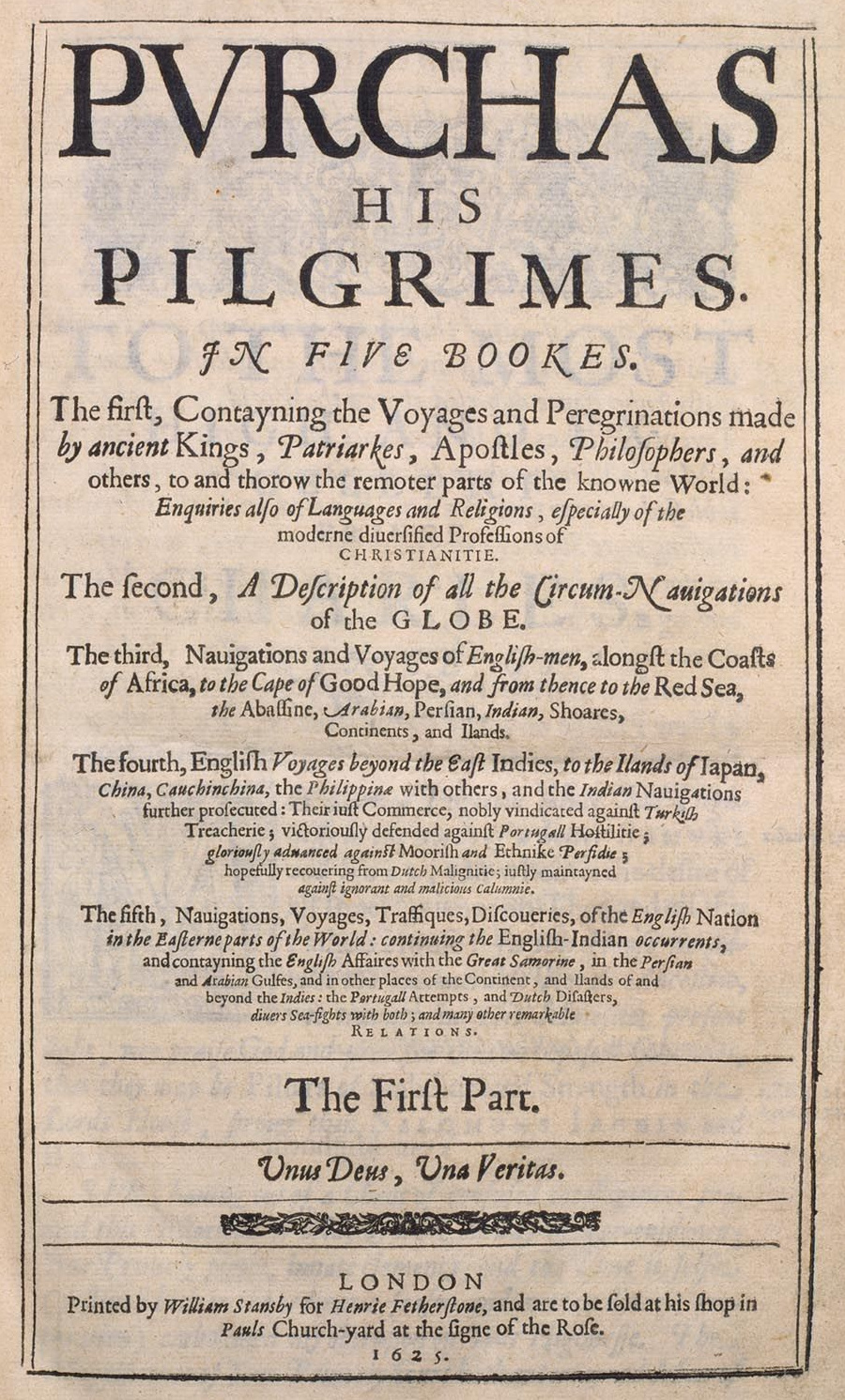
Purchas his Pilgrimes, London, 1625

The his genitive is a means of forming a genitive construction by linking two nouns with a possessive adjective such as "his" (e.g. "my friend his car" instead of "my friend's car"). This construction was only very briefly widely used in English in the late 16th century and the 17th century but is common in some varieties of many different Germanic languages and is standard in Afrikaans.

== In English ==
In Early Modern English, the orthographic practice developed of marking the genitive case by inserting the word "his" between the possessor noun, especially if it ended in -s, and the following possessed noun. The heyday of the construction was the late 16th and early 17th century. It was employed by John Lyly, Euphues His England (1580), the poem Willobie His Avisa (1594), in the travel accounts under the title Purchas His Pilgrimes (1602), Ben Jonson's Sejanus His Fall (1603) and John Donne's Ignatius His Conclave (1611). For example, in 1622, the Holy Roman Emperor's ambassador in London "ran at tilt in the Prince his company with Lord Montjoy". The term "his genitive" may refer to marking genitives with "his" as a reflexive or intensifying marker or, much more precisely, the practice of using "his" instead of an -s. Therefore, use of the "his" genitive in writing occurred throughout later Middle English and Early Modern English as an intensifier but as a replacement marker for only briefly.

=== Origins and history ===
In Old English, the genitive case was marked most often by an "-es" ending for masculine and neuter nouns, but it was marked with other suffixes or by umlaut with many nouns. There are no unassailable examples of the "his" genitive in Anglo-Saxon. Although a small number of examples were produced by earlier scholars to show that the "his" genitive can be traced back to Old English, Allen examines every putative example of the "his" genitive that has been presented from Old English and finds them all to be subject to other possible analyses. The first clear examples of the "his" genitive do not appear until c. 1250, when the "-s" ending had extended to all noun classes and NP-internal agreement had disappeared, making the "-s" ending the sole marker of genitive case.

The history of the "his" genitives in English is extensively covered in Allen (2008). There were two periods of "his" genitives. In the earliest period, only "his" (or some "h"-less form such as "ys", "is" or "us") is found, even if the possessor was feminine, as in Margere ys dowghter ys past to Godd 'Margery's daughter has passed to God' (Cely letter from 1482) or plural, as in not borrowed of other men his lippes 'not borrowed from other men's lips' (Roger Asham, b. 1515). In 1546, however, Elizabeth Holland her howse 'Elizabeth Holland's house' is found, and afterward, the pronoun always agrees with a feminine or plural head. However, most examples involve singular masculine possessors and are therefore not diagnostic for agreement or the lack of it. Most examples in fact involve men's names.

Around 1680, the "his" genitive began to disappear in contrast to the "-s" genitive. Before then, both "his" and -s genitives occur in the writings of the same author although the -s genitive is always dominant, except with men's names. Essentially, this meant writing or saying, "Ned his house", instead of "Neds house". As George Oliver Curme puts it, "The s-genitive was doubtless felt by many as a contraction of the his-genitive, which strengthened the tendency to place an apostrophe before the genitive endings" (as an indication of an elided "his"). The "his" genitive was not limited to masculine singular nouns in Middle English, but was also found with feminine gender and plural number. It is only in the mid-16th century, in Early Modern English, that "agreeing" genitives are found like "Pallas her Glasse" from Sir Arthur Gorges's English translation of Francis Bacon's The Wisedome of the Ancients from the original Latin. These "agreeing" genitives were likely analogous. Furthermore, impersonal and lifeless, though linguistically masculine, nouns were rarely expressed with the "his" genitive.

An "agreeing" pronominal genitive is also present in other Germanic languages, but it died out quickly in English. Therefore, there are analogous "his" genitives in Low German and other languages, but no Old English "his" genitive is the source of the Early Modern English form. It is possible that the "his" genitive derived instead from unstressed forms of the Middle English "-es" genitive since, according to Baugh, "the -es of the genitive, being unaccented, was frequently written and pronounced -is, -ys". In other words, it was already pronounced as "his", and "his" often lost its /h/ when it was unstressed in speech. Therefore, it is likely that people were already saying "his" after a masculine noun in later Middle English by hypercorrection, and the "his" genitive may therefore have been an orthographic anomaly. Samuel Johnson, among others, recognised that the apostrophe possessive was not due to the contraction of "his".

The "his" genitive as a hypercorrection had a brief literary existence, whatever its prevalence in spoken English. Having only appeared around 1580, it was exceptionally rare by 1700. As printing became more widespread, and printed grammars informally standardized written English, the "-s" genitive (also known as the Saxon genitive) with an apostrophe (as if a "his" had been contracted) had gone to all nominal genders, including nouns that previously had an unmarked genitive (such as "Lady" in "Lady Day"). This remains the general form for creating possessives in English.

== Parallels in other languages ==
Constructions parallel to the "his" genitive are found in other languages, especially Germanic and Turkic.

=== Germanic ===
- In dialects of German, equivalent constructions like dem Mann sein Haus ("the man-dative his house" instead of genitive case: das Haus des Mannes, or des Mannes Haus, which is archaic) are found. The construction is deliberately used as a pun in the title of Der Dativ ist dem Genitiv sein Tod (lit. The dative is to the genitive its death instead of The dative is the genitive's death), a very popular series of five books of prescriptivist German language advice, critically acclaimed for their humour, by German journalist and author Bastian Sick.
- The modern Saxon language, commonly known as Low German, developed this form of genitive as early as in the Middle Ages. Early stages included mixture forms of genitive and his-construction: Des fischers sin hus (the fisherman's his house). Later development brought forth two kinds of dative constructions existing alongside the proper genitive: Deme fischer sin hus (the fisherman his house) and dat hus van deme fischer (the house of the fisherman) next to des fischers hus (the fisherman's house). Not every class and dialect used both forms equally. Some German-speakers making those mistakes might trace them back to the time of Low German being the language of the lower classes, before High German (or Dutch) established itself as most common first language in all regions and classes.
- In Dutch, the construction is common in the spoken language and dependent on the gender of the possessor (and in most Belgian Dutch dialects on the gender of the object as well). In the Netherlands, possessive pronouns are represented as they are spoken, in their informal unstressed form: Jan z'n fiets, "Jan his bicycle" meaning Jan's bicycle; Anja d'r tas, "Anja her bag". In Belgian Dutch, the full form is common: Jan zijn fiets, Anja haar tas, and the standard form Jans fiets is not commonly used in spoken language. Although discouraged in written Dutch, the construction has found its way into literature as early as the mid-19th-century poetry of Piet Paaltjens and in proverbs such as De een z'n dood is de ander z'n brood (lit. "One man's death is another man's bread", i.e. "One man's breath, another's death"/"One person's loss is another person's gain").
- In Afrikaans, the construction die man se kinders ("the man's children") is standard. The possessive element se appears to derive from sy "his", but unlike in Dutch, it is used with all genders and numbers: die vrouens se kinders "the women's children".
- Norwegian, especially in colloquial registers, uses reflexive possessive pronouns extensively. They agree with the possessor in number (third person) but are also declined according to gender and number of the object (rather than that of the possessor), e.g. "Pål sine høner (Pål his hens); "Ola sin hund" ("Ola his dog"); "Per si(n) klokke" ("Per his clock"); "Hilde sitt hus" ("Hilde her house"); "Tina sine bøker" ("Tina her books"). In Nynorsk, one may also use "hans" and "hennar", e.g. "Klokka hans Per" ("The clock his Per"); "Huset hennar Hilde" ("The house her Hilde"); "Grauten hennar mor" ("The porridge her Mom").

An important difference between the early "his" genitives in Middle English and those of the other Germanic languages is that the early English "his" genitives agreed with neither the possessor nor the possessed. The possessive marker was always some form of "his" or "ys". In Early Modern English, however, the genitive marker was clearly a pronoun that agreed with the possessor.

=== Non-Germanic ===
"His" genitive constructions also occur in Turkic languages (including Turkish and Azerbaijani), Hungarian, and Indonesian. Unlike in Germanic languages, they are marked by possessive affixes, instead of separate pronouns. All of those constructions have no historic relation to the Germanic ones.
