= Rhenish Basic Law =

Das Rheinische Grundgesetz (Kölsch: Et rheinisch Jrundjesetz; "The Rhenish Basic Law"), also called et kölsche Jrundjesetz ("the Colognian Basic Law"), is a collection of eleven dialect sayings from the Rhineland that Konrad Beikircher published in his 2001 book Et kütt wie et kütt – Das Rheinische Grundgesetz. Neither the original authors nor the period in which these maxims arose is known. As early as 1533, however, Heinrich Cornelius Agrippa von Nettesheim remarked: "There is a common saying: whenever people wish to point to some foolish, rash scheme, they say, 'It is a Cologne edict' or 'a Cologne counsel.'"

== Et Rheinisch Jrundjesetz ==
The articles read:

Article 1: Et es wie et es.
("It is as it is.")
Face the facts; you cannot change them anyway.

Article 2: Et kütt wie et kütt.
("It comes as it comes.")
Resign yourself to the inevitable; you cannot change the course of things in any case.

Article 3: Et hätt noch emmer joot jejange.
("It has always turned out all right so far.")
What went well yesterday will work tomorrow too.
Depending on the situation also: We know it's a botch-job, but it'll be fine.

Article 4: Wat fott es, es fott.
("What's gone is gone.")
Don't pine after things, and don't grieve over what is long forgotten.

Article 5: Et bliev nix wie et wor.
("Nothing stays as it was.")
Be open to change.

Article 6: Kenne mer nit, bruche mer nit, fott domet.
("Don't know it, don't need it, away with it.")
Be critical when novelties get out of hand.

Article 7: Wat wellste maache?
("What do you want to do?")
Resign yourself to your fate.

Article 8: Maach et joot, ävver nit zo off.
("Do it well, but not too often.")
Quality over quantity.

Article 9: Wat soll dä Kwatsch/Käu?
("What's the point of this nonsense?")
Always ask the universal question.

Article 10: Drinks de ejne met?
("Will you have a drink with us?")
Honour the duty of hospitality.

Article 11: Do laachs de disch kapott.
("That'll make you laugh yourself to pieces.")
Keep a healthy attitude towards humour.

== Supplements ==
Some authors list additional supplements:

Mät nix. ("Never mind.")
Be tolerant!

Jede Jeck es anders. ("Every fool is different.")
Take your fellow human beings as they are.
Also extended: Jede Jeck es anders, jeder es anders jeck, und jet jeck sin mir all. ("Every fool is different, everyone is foolish in his own way, and we are all a little foolish.")

Hammer immer esu jemaat. ("We've always done it this way.")
Hold on to what is tried and tested.

Küste hück nit, küste morje. ("If you don't come today, you'll come tomorrow.")
No need to rush.

Bliev wie de bes! ("Stay as you are.")
Don't let yourself be bent out of shape.

De Haupsaach es, et Hätz es joot! ("The main thing is, the heart is good.")
What counts are inner values.
