= German conjugation =

Of verbs

German verbs are conjugated depending on their usage as in English. Verbs in German are modified depending on the persons (identity) and number of the subject of a sentence, as well as depending on the tense and mood.

The citation form of German verbs is the infinitive form, which generally consists of the bare form of the verb with -(e)n added to the end. To conjugate regular verbs, this is removed and replaced with alternative endings: Radical: mach-

- To do; machen
  - I do; ich mache
  - He does; er macht
  - I did; ich machte
  - He did; er machte

In general, irregular forms of German verbs exist to make for easier and clearer pronunciation, with a vowel sound in the centre of the word the only part of the word that changes in an unexpected way (though endings may also be slightly different). This modification is often a moving of the vowel sound to one pronounced further forward in the mouth. This process is called the Germanic umlaut. However, a number of verbs including sein (to be) are fully irregular, as in English I am and I was sound completely different.

- To know; wissen Radical: wiss- wuss-
  - I know; ich weiß or weiss (vowel change; -e missing) (irregular)
  - I knew; ich wusste (vowel change; otherwise regular)
- To sing; singen
  - I sing; ich singe (regular)
  - I sang; ich sang (vowel change; -te missing)

For many German tenses, the verb itself is locked in a non-varying form of the infinitive or past participle (which normally starts with ge-) that is the same regardless of the subject, and then joined to an auxiliary verb that is conjugated. This is similar to English grammar, though the primary verb is normally placed at the end of the clause. In both the examples shown below the auxiliary verb is irregular.

- I buy the book; Ich kaufe das Buch.
- I will buy the book; Ich werde das Buch kaufen.
  - She will buy the book; Sie wird das Buch kaufen.
- I have bought the book; Ich habe das Buch gekauft.
  - She has bought the book; Sie hat das Buch gekauft.

The following tenses and moods are formed by direct conjugation of the verb:

- Present – Präsens
- Preterite – Präteritum (in older works also called Imperfekt)
- Imperative – Imperativ
- Perfect – Perfekt (past participle, does not vary by subject)
- Conditional I and II – Konjunktiv

Below is a paradigm of German verbs, that is, a set of conjugation tables, for the model regular verbs and for some of the most common irregular verbs, including the irregular auxiliary verbs.

== German tenses and moods ==
German verbs have forms for a range of subjects, indicating number and social status:

- First-person singular: 'I'; ich
- Second-person familiar: 'you' (as used to a friend); du
- Second-person familiar: 'you' (as used to a friend); Du (possible form in letters, traditionally used for all kinds of addresses)
- Second-person polite: 'you'; Sie (with capital S)
- Third person: 'he', 'she', 'it'; (er, sie, es) with the same form for all three
- First-person plural: 'we'; wir
- Second-person plural: ihr
- Third-person plural: 'they'; sie (not capitalised)

The subject does not have to be one of these pronouns, but can instead be anything that has the same person and number. For example, in the sentences Der Ball ist rund. ("The ball is round.") and Es ist rund. ("It is round."), the verb is in the same form: third-person singular.

In German, the first-person and third-person plural and second-person plural-polite forms are identical for all verbs in every tense. Sie in the second person is used to address one or more people of higher status.

As a summary of German tenses, moods and aspects:

- The German present tense matches both the English present ("I walk to work every day") and also the present progressive ("I am walking to work right now"), to which standard German has no direct equivalent. (See below for a colloquial alternative.) It is formed similarly to the English present tense, by directly conjugating the relevant verb to match the subject.
- The perfect (I have gone to work; also sometimes called the present perfect) is mostly formed, again as in English, from the appropriate present tense form of 'to have' (haben) and a past participle of the relevant verb placed at the end of the clause. Some intransitive verbs involving motion or change take 'to be' (sein) instead of haben; this may depend on the exact meaning of the sentence. Both haben and sein are used in the present tense, and are irregular verbs.
  - 'He has read the book': Er hat das Buch gelesen. (Literally, "He has the book read.")
  - 'He has gone to the cinema': Er ist ins Kino gegangen. (but literally, "He is into the cinema gone.")
- The preterite (I closed the door; usually avoided when speaking) is formed from the verb, as in English. The verb may be regular or irregular.
- The pluperfect (I had read the book, when...) is formed in the same way as in English: identically to the perfect, except with an preterite form of haben or sein instead of a present tense form.
  - He had read the book; Er hatte das Buch gelesen.
  - He had gone to the cinema; Er war ins Kino gegangen.
- The future tense (I will read the book or I'm going to read the book) is formed from the appropriate present tense form of the verb werden (to become) and, as in English, the infinitive of the relevant verb.
  - I will read the book: Ich werde das Buch lesen.
  - A classic but easily avoided mistake made by English-speakers learning German is to use "Ich will" – which actually means I want to.
- The imperative (Be quiet!, Open the door!) is formed by direct conjugation of the verb and varies by number and status of the people addressed, unlike English which always uses an infinitive.
  - Be quiet: Sei ruhig! (when speaking to one person); but Seien Sie ruhig! when speaking to an authority figure. Sei and Seien are both formed from sein (be).
- The conditional (I would do it) can be formed from würden (would) and the infinitive of the relevant verb, placed at the end of the clause.
  - I would love her; Ich würde sie lieben.
- Additional forms of the conditional (known as Konjunktiv I & II, for the present and preterite) also exist. They are equivalent to English forms such as If I were rich or If I loved him, (but also It would be great) and exist for every verb in the present and preterite tense. They are often avoided for uncommon verbs. For the future tense conditional, the conditional form of werden is used with an infinitive.
  - If I were rich; Wenn ich reich wäre, ...
  - If I had more money; Wenn ich mehr Geld hätte, ...
  - It would be fantastic; Es wäre fantastisch
- The passive (It is done) may be formed for any tense. It is formed from the past participle and the appropriate form of the verb werden (to become).
  - The lawn is being mowed; Der Rasen wird gemäht (Literally, "The lawn becomes/is becoming mowed.")
  - The lawn was mowed; Der Rasen wurde gemäht. (Literally, "The lawn became/was becoming mowed.")
  - The lawn has been mowed; Der Rasen ist gemäht geworden.
  - The lawn will be mowed; Der Rasen wird gemäht werden. (This uses the verb werden twice in one sentence, but is still quite correct.)
  - The lawn would be mowed; Der Rasen würde gemäht werden.
- Many German verbs can be converted into the names of jobs, adjectives and verbal nouns describing processes (as English to clean becomes the cleaner, the man cleaning the window and the cleaning process). These generally follow regular patterns, with endings such as -en and -ung. Colloquial German, in particular in the Rhineland and Ruhr areas, uses these verbal nouns with sein to create a kind of present progressive known as the rheinische Verlaufsform:
  - I'm working; "Ich bin am Arbeiten."
  - Arbeiten is not a verb as in the English equivalent but a noun, and is therefore capitalised. A literal translation would be: "I'm at the working."
- A colloquial method to express future actions is to use present tense with an adjective like tomorrow showing that the event will happen in the future:
  - Tomorrow, I am going to buy groceries; Morgen kaufe ich Lebensmittel. (Literally, Tomorrow, I buy groceries.)

== Regular -en verbs (weak verbs) (lieben, to love) ==
The following tables include only the active simple tenses, i.e., those formed by direct conjugation from the verb.

Infinitiv
Infinitiv Präsens	lieben
Infinitiv Futur I	lieben werden
substantivierter Infinitiv	das Lieben (gen. des Liebens)
Partizip I Präsens	liebend (liebender, liebende, liebendes, liebende)
Partizip II (Perfekt)	geliebt (geliebter, geliebte, geliebtes, geliebte)
Indikativ	ich	du	er/sie/es	wir	ihr	sie/Sie
Präsens	liebe	liebst	liebt	lieben	liebt	lieben
Präteritum (Imperfekt)	liebte	liebtest	liebte	liebten	liebtet	liebten
Futur I	werde lieben	wirst lieben	wird lieben	werden lieben	werdet lieben	werden lieben
Konditional	ich	du	er/sie/es	wir	ihr	sie/Sie
Präsens	würde lieben	würdest lieben	würde lieben	würden lieben	würdet lieben	würden lieben
Konjunktiv	ich	du	er/sie/es	wir	ihr	sie/Sie
Konjunktiv I	liebe	liebest	liebe	lieben	liebet	lieben
Konjunktiv II	liebte	liebtest	liebte	liebten	liebtet	liebten
Futur I	werde lieben	werdest lieben	werde lieben	werden lieben	werdet lieben	werden lieben
Imperativ		du	er/sie/es	wir	ihr	sie/Sie
		lieb(e)	liebe	lieben	liebt	lieben

The ending -e in the imperative singular is almost obligatorily lost in colloquial usage. In the standard language it may be lost or not: lieb! or liebe!, sag! or sage!

The ending -e in the first-person singular of the present is always kept in normal written style (ich liebe, ich sage), but may also be lost in colloquial usage (ich lieb', ich sag'). This occurs more often than not in the middle of a sentence, somewhat less frequently if the verb comes to stand in the end of a sentence.

For verbs whose roots end in a sibilant sound (s, ß, z, ss, x), the -st ending is changed to -t. For example, losen.

== Regular -n verbs (weak verbs) (handeln, to act) ==
When a verb stem ends in -el or -er, the ending -en is dropped in favor of -n.

Infinitiv
Present infinitive	handeln
Infinitiv Futur I	handeln werden
substantivierter Infinitiv	das Handeln (gen. des Handelns)
Partizip I Praesens	handelnd (handelnder, handelnde, handelndes, handelnde)
Partizip II (Perfekt)	gehandelt (gehandelter, gehandelte, gehandeltes, gehandelte)
Indikativ	ich	du	er/sie/es	wir	ihr	sie/Sie
Present	handle/handele	handelst	handelt	handeln	handelt	handeln
Präteritum	handelte	handeltest	handelte	handelten	handeltet	handelten
Futur I	werde handeln	wirst handeln	wird handeln	werden handeln	werdet handeln	werden handeln
Konditional	ich	du	er/sie/es	wir	ihr	sie/Sie
Präsens	würde handeln	würdest handeln	würde handeln	würden handeln	würdet handeln	würden handeln
Konjunktiv	ich	du	er/sie/es	wir	ihr	sie/Sie
Konjunktiv I	handle	handlest	handle	handlen	handlet	handlen
Konjunktiv II	handelte	handeltest	handelte	handelten	handeltet	handelten
Futur I	werde handeln	werdest handeln	werde handeln	werden handeln	werdet handeln	werden handeln
Imperativ		du		wir	ihr	Sie
		handle		handeln	handelt	handeln

== Regular -ten verbs (weak verbs) (arbeiten, to work) ==
When a verb stem ends in -t, an intermediate -e- is added before most endings to prevent a large consonant cluster.

Infinitiv
Infinitiv Präsens	arbeiten
Infinitiv Futur I	arbeiten werden
substantivierter Infinitiv	das Arbeiten (gen. des Arbeitens)
Partizip I Praesens	arbeitend (arbeitender, arbeitende, arbeitendes, arbeitende)
Partizip II (Perfekt)	gearbeitet (gearbeiteter, gearbeitetet, gearbeitetes, gearbeitete)
Indikativ	ich	du	er/sie/es	wir	ihr	sie/Sie
Präsens	arbeite	arbeitest	arbeitet	arbeiten	arbeitet	arbeiten
Präteritum	arbeitete	arbeitetest	arbeitete	arbeiteten	arbeitetet	arbeiteten
Futur I	werde arbeiten	wirst arbeiten	wird arbeiten	werden arbeiten	werdet arbeiten	werden arbeiten
Konditional	ich	du	er/sie/es	wir	ihr	sie/Sie
Präsens	würde arbeiten	würdest arbeiten	würde arbeiten	würden arbeiten	würdet arbeiten	würden arbeiten
Konjunktiv	ich	du	er/sie/es	wir	ihr	sie/Sie
Konjunktiv I	arbeite	arbeitest	arbeite	arbeiten	arbeitet	arbeiten
Konjunktiv II	arbeitete	arbeitetest	arbeitete	arbeiteten	arbeitetet	arbeiteten
Futur I	werde arbeiten	werdest arbeiten	werde arbeiten	werden arbeiten	werdet arbeiten	werden arbeiten
Imperativ		du		wir	ihr	Sie
		arbeite		arbeiten	arbeitet	arbeiten

== Irregular -en verbs (strong verbs) (fahren, to drive) ==
Certain verbs change their stem vowel for the second-person and third-person singular forms. These usually follow one of three patterns:

- e → ie
- e → i
- a → ä

Infinitiv
Infinitiv Präsens	fahren
Infinitiv Futur I	fahren werden
substantivierter Infinitiv	das Fahren (gen. des Fahrens)
Partizip I Praesens	fahrend (fahrender, fahrende, fahrendes, fahrende)
Partizip II (Perfekt)	gefahren (gefahrener, gefahrene, gefahrenes, gefahrene)
Indikativ	ich	du	er/sie/es	wir	ihr	sie/Sie
Präsens	fahre	fährst	fährt	fahren	fahrt	fahren
Präteritum	fuhr	fuhrst	fuhr	fuhren	fuhrt	fuhren
Futur I	werde fahren	wirst fahren	wird fahren	werden fahren	werdet fahren	werden fahren
Konditional	ich	du	er/sie/es	wir	ihr	sie/Sie
Präsens	würde fahren	würdest fahren	würde fahren	würden fahren	würdet fahren	würden fahren
Konjunktiv	ich	du	er/sie/es	wir	ihr	sie/Sie
Konjunktiv I	fahre	fahrest	fahre	fahren	fahret	fahren
Konjunktiv II	führe	führest	führe	führen	führet	führen
Futur I	werde fahren	werdest fahren	werde fahren	werden fahren	werdet fahren	werden fahren
Imperativ		du		wir	ihr	Sie
		fahr(e)		fahren	fahrt	fahren

== Irregular -en verbs (strong verbs) (geben, to give) ==
Certain verbs change their stem vowels for the preterite indicative and subjunctive. These changes are unique for each verb.

Infinitiv
Infinitiv Präsens	geben
Infinitiv Futur I	geben werden
substantivierter Infinitiv	das Geben (gen. des Gebens)
Partizip I Praesens	gebend (gebender, gebende, gebendes, gebende)
Partizip II (Perfekt)	gegeben (gegebener, gegebene, gegebenes, gegebene)
Indikativ	ich	du	er/sie/es	wir	ihr	sie/Sie
Präsens	gebe	gibst	gibt	geben	gebt	geben
Präteritum	gab	gabst	gab	gaben	gabt	gaben
Futur I	werde geben	wirst geben	wird geben	werden geben	werdet geben	werden geben
Konditional	ich	du	er/sie/es	wir	ihr	sie/Sie
Präsens	würde geben	würdest geben	würde geben	würden geben	würdet geben	würden geben
Konjunktiv	ich	du	er/sie/es	wir	ihr	sie/Sie
Konjunktiv I	gebe	gebest	gebe	geben	gebet	geben
Konjunktiv II	gäbe	gäbest	gäbe	gäben	gäbet	gäben
Futur I	werde geben	werdest geben	werde geben	werden geben	werdet geben	werden geben
Imperativ		du		wir	ihr	Sie
		gib		geben	gebt	geben

== Irregular verbs (gehen, to go, to walk) ==
Infinitiv
Infinitiv Präsens	gehen
Infinitiv Futur I	gehen werden
substantivierter Infinitiv	das Gehen (gen. des Gehens)
Partizip I Praesens	gehend (gehender, gehende, gehendes, gehende)
Partizip II (Perfekt)	gegangen (gegangener, gegangene, gegangenes, gegangene)
Indikativ	ich	du	er/sie/es	wir	ihr	sie/Sie
Präsens	gehe	gehst	geht	gehen	geht	gehen
Präteritum	ging	gingst	ging	gingen	gingt	gingen
Futur I	werde gehen	wirst gehen	wird gehen	werden gehen	werdet gehen	werden gehen
Konditional	ich	du	er/sie/es	wir	ihr	sie/Sie
Präsens	würde gehen	würdest gehen	würde gehen	würden gehen	würdet gehen	würden gehen
Konjunktiv	ich	du	er/sie/es	wir	ihr	sie/Sie
Konjunktiv I	gehe	gehest	gehe	gehen	gehet	gehen
Konjunktiv II	ginge	gingest	ginge	gingen	ginget	gingen
Futur I	werde gehen	werdest gehen	werde gehen	werden gehen	werdet gehen	werden gehen
Imperativ		du		wir	ihr	Sie
		geh(e)		gehen	geht	gehen

== Modal verbs (dürfen, may) ==
In modal verbs, the stem vowel will change for all conjugations of the singular simple present. These changes are unique to each verb. In addition, the ending will be missing for the first and third person conjugations of the singular simple present.

Infinitiv
Infinitiv Präsens	dürfen
Infinitiv Futur I	dürfen werden
substantivierter Infinitiv	das Dürfen (gen. des Dürfens)
Partizip I Praesens	dürfend (dürfender, dürfende, dürfendes, dürfende)
Partizip II (Perfekt)	gedurft (gedurfter, gedurfte, gedurftes, gedurfte)
Indikativ	ich	du	er/sie/es	wir	ihr	sie/Sie
Präsens	darf	darfst	darf	dürfen	dürft	dürfen
Präteritum	durfte	durftest	durfte	durften	durftet	durften
Futur I	werde dürfen	wirst dürfen	wird dürfen	werden dürfen	werdet dürfen	werden dürfen
Konditional	ich	du	er/sie/es	wir	ihr	sie/Sie
Präsens	würde dürfen	würdest dürfen	würde dürfen	würden dürfen	würdet dürfen	würden dürfen
Konjunktiv	ich	du	er/sie/es	wir	ihr	sie/Sie
Konjunktiv I	dürfe	dürfest	dürfe	dürfen	dürfet	dürfen
Konjunktiv II	dürfte	dürftest	dürfte	dürften	dürftet	dürften
Futur I	werde dürfen	werdest dürfen	werde dürfen	werden dürfen	werdet dürfen	werden dürfen
Imperativ		du		wir	ihr	Sie
		dürfe		dürfen	dürft	dürfen

== werden (to become, shall, will) ==
Infinitiv
Infinitiv Präsens	werden
Infinitiv Futur I	werden werden
substantivierter Infinitiv	das Werden (gen. des Werdens)
Partizip I Praesens	werdend (werdender, werdende, werdendes, werdende)
Partizip II (Perfekt)	geworden (gewordener, gewordene, gewordenes, gewordene) (to become) worden (aux. shall, will)
Indikativ	ich	du	er/sie/es	wir	ihr	sie/Sie
Präsens	werde	wirst	wird	werden	werdet	werden
Präteritum	wurde (archaic ward)	wurdest (archaic wardst)	wurde (archaic ward)	wurden	wurdet	wurden
Futur I	werde werden	wirst werden	wird werden	werden werden	werdet werden	werden werden
Konditional	ich	du	er/sie/es	wir	ihr	sie/Sie
Präsens	würde werden	würdest werden	würde werden	würden werden	würdet werden	würden werden
Konjunktiv	ich	du	er/sie/es	wir	ihr	sie/Sie
Konjunktiv I	werde	werdest	werde	werden	werdet	werden
Konjunktiv II	würde	würdest	würde	würden	würdet	würden
Futur I	werde werden	werdest werden	werde werden	werden werden	werdet werden	werden werden
Imperativ		du		wir	ihr	Sie
		werde		werden	werdet	werden

== Irregular verbs sein (to be) ==
Infinitiv
Infinitiv Präsens	sein
Infinitiv Futur I	sein werden
substantivierter Infinitiv	das Sein (gen. des Seins)
Partizip I Praesens	seiend (seiender, seiende, seiendes, seiende)
Partizip II (Perfekt)	gewesen (gewesener, gewesene, gewesenes, gewesene)
Indikativ	ich	du	er/sie/es	wir	ihr	sie/Sie
Präsens	bin	bist	ist	sind	seid	sind
Präteritum	war	warst	war	waren	wart	waren
Futur I	werde sein	wirst sein	wird sein	werden sein	werdet sein	werden sein
Konditional	ich	du	er/sie/es	wir	ihr	sie/Sie
Präsens	würde sein	würdest sein	würde sein	würden sein	würdet sein	würden sein
Konjunktiv	ich	du	er/sie/es	wir	ihr	sie/Sie
Konjunktiv I	sei	sei(e)st	sei	seien	seiet	seien
Konjunktiv II	wäre	wärest	wäre	wären	wäret	wären
Futur I	werde sein	werdest sein	werde sein	werden sein	werdet sein	werden sein
Imperativ		du		wir	ihr	Sie
		sei		seien	seid	seien

== haben (to have) ==
Infinitiv
Infinitiv Präsens	haben
Infinitiv Futur I	haben werden
substantivierter Infinitiv	das Haben (gen. des Habens)
Partizip I Praesens	habend (habender, habende, habendes, habende)
Partizip II (Perfekt)	gehabt (gehabter, gehabte, gehabtes, gehabte)
Indikativ	ich	du	er/sie/es	wir	ihr	sie/Sie
Präsens	habe	hast	hat	haben	habt	haben
Präteritum	hatte	hattest	hatte	hatten	hattet	hatten
Futur I	werde haben	wirst haben	wird haben	werden haben	werdet haben	werden haben
Konditional	ich	du	er/sie/es	wir	ihr	sie/Sie
Präsens	würde haben	würdest haben	würde haben	würden haben	würdet haben	würden haben
Konjunktiv	ich	du	er/sie/es	wir	ihr	sie/Sie
Konjunktiv I	habe	habest	habe	haben	habet	haben
Konjunktiv II	hätte	hättest	hätte	hätten	hättet	hätten
Futur I	werde haben	werdest haben	werde haben	werden haben	werdet haben	werden haben
Imperativ		du		wir	ihr	Sie
		hab(e)		haben	habt	haben

== tun (to do) ==
Infinitiv
Infinitiv Präsens	tun
Infinitiv Futur I	tun werden
substantivierter Infinitiv	das Tun (gen. des Tuns)
Partizip I Praesens	tuend (tuender, tuende, tuendes, tuende)
Partizip II (Perfekt)	getan (getaner, getane, getanes, getane)
Indikativ	ich	du	er/sie/es	wir	ihr	sie/Sie
Präsens	tue	tust	tut	tun	tut	tun
Präteritum	tat	tatest	tat	taten	tatet	taten
Futur I	werde tun	wirst tun	wird tun	werden tun	werdet tun	werden tun
Konditional	ich	du	er/sie/es	wir	ihr	sie/Sie
Präsens	würde tun	würdest tun	würde tun	würden tun	würdet tun	würden tun
Konjunktiv	ich	du	er/sie/es	wir	ihr	sie/Sie
Konjunktiv I	tue	tuest	tue	tuen	tuet	tuen
Konjunktiv II	täte	tätest	täte	täten	tätet	täten
Futur I	werde tun	werdest tun	werde tun	werden tun	werdet tun	werden tun
Imperativ		du		wir	ihr	Sie
		tu(e)		tun	tut	tun

== Separable and inseparable verbs ==
In German, prepositions and modifying prefixes are frequently attached to verbs to alter their meaning. Verbs so formed are divided into separable verbs which detach the prefix under certain circumstances and inseparable verbs which do not. The conjugations are identical to that of the root verb, and the position of the prefix for both separable and inseparable verbs follows a standard pattern. The prefix's effect on the verb is highly unpredictable, so normally the meaning of each new verb has to be learned separately. (See German verbs for further information on the meanings of common prefixes.)

Separable verbs detach their prefixes in the present, preterite and imperative. The prefix is placed at the end of the clause. The past participle is the prefix attached to the normal past participle. The infinitive keeps the prefix where it is used, for example in the conditional and future tenses.

- nehmen — "to take" (irregular verb)
  - Er nimmt das Buch — He is taking the book. (Vowel change)
  - Er hat das Buch genommen — He has taken the book. (Vowel change and the -en ending common with irregular verbs)
  - Er wird das Buch nehmen — He will take the book. (Future tense)
- zunehmen — to increase (or put on weight)
  - Es nimmt schnell zu — It is quickly increasing
  - Es hat schnell zugenommen — It has quickly increased
  - Es wird schnell zunehmen — It will increase quickly. (Increase is being used in the infinitive as this is the future tense.)

Inseparable verbs retain the prefix at all times. The past participle has the prefix in place of ge- but keeps any irregularities of the root verb's past participle.

- kaufen — "to buy" (regular verb)
  - Ich kaufe es — I buy it
  - Ich habe es gekauft — I have bought it
- verkaufen — to sell
  - Ich verkaufe es — I sell it
  - Ich habe es verkauft — I have sold it (regular apart from ver- replacing ge-)

A number of verbs are separable with one meaning and inseparable with another. For example, übersetzen means "to translate" as an inseparable verb but "to ferry" as a separable verb.
