= Languages of Germany =

- Official: German
- Regional: Low German
- Vernacular: German dialects
- Minority: Danish, North Frisian, Sater Frisian, Romani, Lower Sorbian, Upper Sorbian
- Immigrant: Albanian, Arabic, English, Kurdish, Polish, Romanian, Russian, Serbo-Croatian, Turkish, Ukrainian and others
- Foreign: English 65%; French 16%; Spanish 8%
- Signed: German Sign Language
- Keyboard layout: QWERTZ
- Source: https://europa.eu/eurobarometer/surveys/detail/2979

The official language of Germany is German. Standard German and its regional dialects are spoken as first languages in Germany. Recognized minority languages have official status as well, usually in their respective regions.

== Language spoken at home ==
Neither the 1987 West German census nor the 2011 census inquired about language. Starting with the 2017 microcensus (a survey with a sampling fraction of 1% of the persons and households in Germany that supplies basic sociodemographic data and facilitates ongoing monitoring of the labor market), a question asking, "Which language is spoken predominantly in your household?" was added, nearly eighty years since the 1939 Census asked for the mother tongue of the population.

According to a 2020 Pew Research survey, the most commonly spoken languages at home were:

- German (90% of households)
- Turkish (2% of households)
- Arabic (1% of households)
- Other (6% of households)

The questionnaire did not distinguish Standard German from German dialects.

== German dialects ==
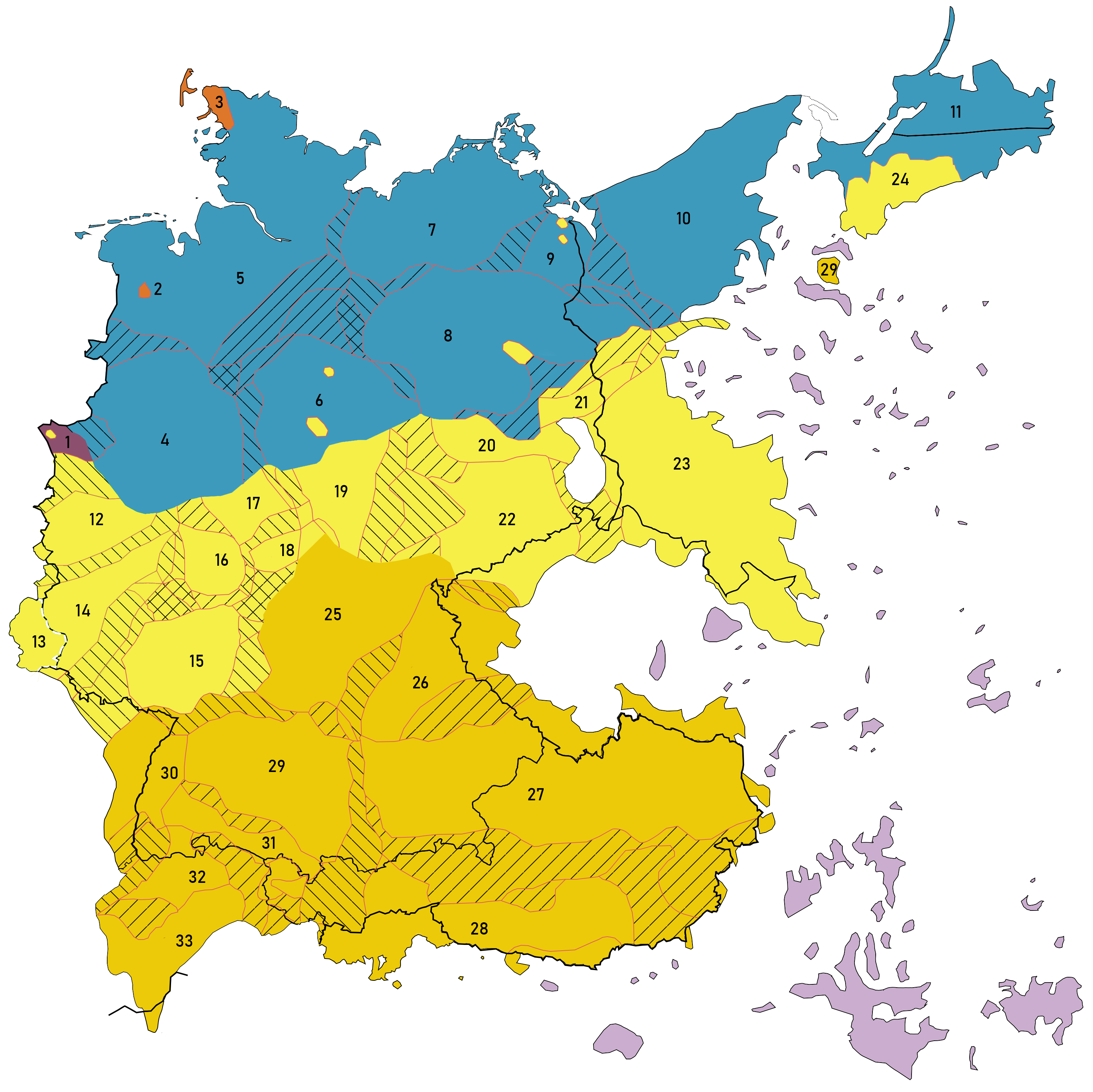
German dialect area around 1900, defined as all West Germanic varieties using Standard German as their literary language: Low Franconian Frisian Low Saxon or Low German Middle German High German

The German language area is characterized by a range of different dialects. There is a written and spoken standard language but there are also large differences in the usage of the standard and the local dialects. The flight and expulsion of Germans broke down the isolation of dialect areas. In 1959, 20% of West Germans were expellees or refugees. The colloquial speech is a compromise between Standard German and the dialect. Northern Germany (the Low German area) is characterized by a loss of dialects: standard German is the vernacular, with very few regional features even in informal situations. In Central Germany (the Middle German area) there is a tendency towards dialect loss. In Southern Germany (the Upper German area) dialects are still in use. Dialects are declining in all regions except for Bavaria. In 2008, 45% of Bavarians claimed to use only Bavarian in everyday communication.

== Minority languages ==
Recognized minority languages include:

- Romani (0.08%)
- Danish (0.06%)
- North Frisian (0.01%) and Saterland Frisian
- Upper Sorbian and Lower Sorbian (0.01%)

=== Proposals for new minority languages ===
Although Yiddish originated in Germany and is still spoken there in some Jewish communities, and despite the Council of Europe's recommendation that German-speaking countries should serve as "trustees of Yiddish," it has no official status in the country. Political discussions to change this status, notably at a 2021 conference titled "How German is Yiddish?", remained unresolved, although a new campaign began in 2026, after the installation of commemorative Yiddish street signs in Berlin.

In 2004, the Yenish people applied for recognition as an ethnic minority of Germany, as in Switzerland; the application was denied. In 2024, the Central Council of Yenish in Germany, established in 2019, submitted a new expert report re-applying for recognition for the ethnic group and the Yenish language.

=== European Charter for Regional or Minority Languages ===
States of Germany preserve primary competence in minority language policies leading to certain variations in the level of protection of minority languages around the country. While German Federal Government, unwilling to intrude on state rights, maintain position that no specific nationwide law on minority languages is needed, the Committee of Experts on the European Charter for Regional or Minority Languages believes that federal law may lead to positive harmonization. Germany ratified the European Charter for Regional or Minority Languages on 16 September 1998 for the following languages in respect of specific Länder:

- Romani (across Germany)
- Danish (in Schleswig-Holstein)
- Low German (part III in Bremen, Hamburg, Mecklenburg-Vorpommern, Lower Saxony and Schleswig-Holstein); (part II in Brandenburg, Northrhine-Westphalia and Saxony-Anhalt)
- North Frisian (in Schleswig-Holstein)
- Saterland Frisian (in Lower Saxony)
- Upper Sorbian (in the Free State of Saxony)
- Lower Sorbian (in Brandenburg)

== Immigrant languages ==
Germany has a large immigrant population, accounting for about one-fifth to one-fourth of the country's total population. Besides German and English, many immigrant languages are spoken due to historical migration waves. These figures are based on data from the 2023 microcensus conducted by the Federal Statistical Office of Germany. Based on language family and population, these languages are:

Afro-Asiatic language Family

- Arabic: Approximately 1,462,000 speakers.

Austroasiatic Language Family

- Vietnamese: Approximately 160,000 speakers.

Dravidian Language Family

- Tamil

Indo-European language Family

- Russian: Approximately 1,895,000 speakers.
- Polish: Approximately 1,024,000 speakers.
- English: Approximately 1,010,000 speakers.
- Romanian: Approximately 762,000 speakers.
- Ukrainian: Approximately 604,000 speakers.
- Albanian: Approximately 597,000 speakers.
- Kurdish: Approximately 574,000 speakers.
- Italian: Approximately 536,000 speakers.
- Persian: Approximately 448,000 speakers.
- Croatian: Approximately 410,000 speakers.
- Spanish: Approximately 336,000 speakers.
- Greek: Approximately 301,000 speakers.
- Serbian: Approximately 294,000 speakers.
- Bosnian: Approximately 256,000 speakers.
- Bulgarian: Approximately 232,000 speakers.
- French: Approximately 192,000 speakers.
- Portuguese: Approximately 166,000 speakers.
- Macedonian: Approximately 102,000 speakers.
- Dutch: Approximately 102,000 speakers.
- Urdu: Approximately 97,000 speakers.
- Hindi: Approximately 80,000 speakers.
- Pashto: Approximately 48,000 speakers.
- Lithuanian

Sino-Tibetan Language Family

- Chinese: Approximately 166,000 speakers.

Turkic language Family

- Turkish: Approximately 2,128,000 speakers.

Uralic Language Family

- Hungarian: Approximately 217,000 speakers.

== Second languages ==
At least 81% of the German primary and secondary students were learning English as their first foreign language in 2017. However, German schoolchildren generally do not speak English as proficiently as their Scandinavian counterparts and, in some cases, French or Latin are taught first.

According to a 2020 analysis conducted by Pew Research Center using 2017 data from Eurostat, the most popular non-English foreign languages learned in German primary and secondary schools were French (15%), Spanish (5%) and Russian (1%), with others garnering less than 1% each. During the existence of the German Democratic Republic (East Germany, 1949–1990), the most common second language taught there was Russian, while English and French were the preferred second languages taught in schools in the Federal Republic of Germany (West Germany).

Several bilingual kindergartens and schools exist in Germany offering education in German and English, French, Spanish, Japanese, Turkish, and other languages.

== See also ==
- German language in the Basic Law
