= German language in the Basic Law =

Public debate on establishing German as a national language

The public debate on whether to establish the German language as a national language in the Basic Law (the constitution of Germany) arises because the Basic Law contains no such provision, and never has since its entry into force in 1949. Both positions (for and against) are advocated for by associations, popular demands, numerous politicians and other public figures.

== Pros and cons of a constitutional amendment ==
=== List of signatures sent to federal president Lammert ===
A desire to establish the German language in the Basic Law emerged in 2010 when the German Language Association and the Association for German Cultural Relations Abroad initiated a collection of signatures in favor of the motion. According to tabloid Bild, the then-President of the Bundestag Norbert Lammert received 46,317 signatures from those organizations. Bild supported the movement.

=== Campaign Deutsch ins Grundgesetz ===
A campaign in favor of the constitutional amendment, titled Deutsch ins Grundgesetz (German into the Basic Law), is spearheaded by language-purist magazine Deutsche Sprachwelt and its publisher, the non-profit Association for Cultivation of the Language, demanding an amendment that would add the sentence: "The language of the Federal Republic of Germany shall be German." to Article 22 paragraph 3 of the Basic Law. Accordingly, the organization maintains a website allowing visitors to sign a petition in favor of the motion. Supporters of the petition include Josef Kraus, president of the German Teachers' Association during 1987–2017, and Andreas Troge, former president of the German Environment Agency.

=== Rationale for the amendment ===
The campaign Deutsch ins Grundgesetz justifies their proposal to include the German Language in the Basic Law as a measure to improve "appreciation of our language", as an "appeal to integrate", and to effect a "respect of the language". It is further claimed that the amendment has "majority support". The petition website claims establishing the German language in the Basic Law would "end Germany's special status as the only German-language country not to mention the German language in its constitution" (see also section: other countries). According to Holger Klatte of the German Language Association, the amendment of Article 22 would emphasize "the prominence of German as a means of communication in our society".

=== Public support for the amendment ===
The CDU party expressed at its 2008 party convention the desire to establish the German language in the Basic Law. After a 2010 collection of signatures, the demand was supported by Hartmut Koschyk (CDU), Peter Friedrich (SPD), Sebastian Edathy (SPD), then Bavarian Minister for the Environment Markus Söder (CSU) and Alexander Dobrindt (CSU).

In 2015 the German Cultural Council reasoned in favor of the same demand by saying the language functions as "an integral cultural connecting link in Germany", which should be considered with "special regard".

During their 2016 party conference in Essen, the CDU resolved to adopt as one of its objectives a constitutional amendment identical to the one demanded by Deutsch ins Grundgesetz. In June 2018, CDU member of parliament Volkmar Klein expressed his support for the demands of the Association for Language Purity. Additional supporters include Monika Grütters (CDU), Wolfgang Thierse (SPD), former President of the Bundestag Norbert Lammert (CDU) and Stephan Brandner (AfD).

On the Day of the German Language, 8 September 2018, former president of the German Teachers' Association Josef Kraus, president of New Fruitful Association Uta Seewald-Heeg, economist Andreas Troge and Kieler gastronomer Andrew Onuegbu, advocated for the establishment of the German language in the Basic Law.

=== Public opposition to the amendment ===
Then Chancellor of Germany Angela Merkel (CDU) criticized her party's 2008 demands for the addition of German into the Basic Law, reasoning that giving increasingly inconsequential issues the gravity of constitutionality would risk a slippery slope. Further criticism of the CDU's decision came from Turkish Advocacy in Germany, members of SPD, FDP, Green Party, the then CSU Secretary General Karl-Theodor zu Guttenberg and then North Rhine-Westphalian family minister Armin Laschet (CDU). Linguist Rolf C. Peter sees languages as simply "evolving" and regards the Basic Law amendment to appoint a national language as based on "a superstition" that "prophesies the downfall of the German language every time a new loanword emerges".

During the parliamentary debate on 2 March 2018, SPD parliamentarian Johann Saathoff delivered a part of his speech in his native East Frisian Low Saxon dialect, in which he rejected the AfD's demands to establish German as a national language in the Basic Law. He emphasized that other languages enrich Germany rather than stunting it.

== Media ==
Die Tageszeitung published in its 2 December 2008 issue a pros-and-cons on incorporating the German language into the Basic Law. On 3 December 2008, journalist Bastian Sick used his Zwiebelfisch column in Der Spiegel (see: Der Dativ ist dem Genitiv sein Tod) to satirize the CDU's proposal and its internal criticism of it.

== Status quo ==
=== Legal situation in Germany ===
==== Basic Law and administrative regulations ====
The Basic Law, as well as all federal and state laws in Germany, are written in German language. Some ordinances have been translated into recognized minority languages, including the state constitution of Mecklenburg-Vorpommern and the "Law for the Promotion of Frisian Language in the Public Sphere" of Schleswig-Holstein. Beyond these, there is no constitutional stipulation for any state or national language. Article 23 paragraph 1 of the Administrative Procedure Act defines German as official language for the exercise of office by certain groups of the federal judiciary. Similar regulations apply in other areas of federal judiciary analogously. In matters of state, German is declared as official language by the State Administrative Procedure Act. The states of Berlin, Rhineland-Palatinate and Saxony-Anhalt do not have any ordinances defining an official language.

==== Other languages in Germany ====
For secondary education, government procedures, cultural events, social and economic activities, certain areas allow official use of Danish, North Frisian, Saterland Frisian, Romani, Upper Sorbian, Lower Sorbian and Low German in accordance with the European Charter for Regional or Minority Languages.

==== Bundestag (federal parliament) ====
On 2 March 2006, the Bundestag's Department III of Constitution and Administration issued a publication titled "language in the Basic Law". On 7 November 2011, the petition for the constitutional amendment received a reserved reaction from the Bundestag. A petition for the opposite motion was also discussed. The parliament did not form a unanimous opinion. On 2 March 2018 the topic of Adding the German Language into the Basic Law was officially debated by parliament. The draft law proposed by AfD, although accompanied by similar demands from CDU/CSU, was also opposed by all other parliamentary groups. It was referred to the Committee for the Interior, the Committee for Education, Research and Technology Impact Assessment, and the Committee for Culture and Media. As of October 2019, parliamentary consideration of the issue has been in limbo since.

=== Status of the German language in other countries ===
- Austria declares the German language as its national language while allowing for laws to recognize minority languages.
- Switzerland's constitution, being a multilingual state, lists French, Italian, Romansh and German in Article 4. The constitutions of multilingual cantons have declared official languages since time immemorial; monolingual cantons however have introduced similar stipulations only relatively recently (Zurich, for instance, in its fully revised 2005 constitution).
- Liechtenstein declares German the national and official language in Article 6 of its constitution.
- Luxemburg's constitution delegates the official use of language to the legislative since 1948. A 1984 law designates German, French and Luxembourgish as equals for use by authorities and agencies, although Luxembourgish is designated national language and French is designated the language of law.
- Belgium's constitution designates four regions with three official languages between them in Article 4 and guarantees the freedom to use any of the country's languages in Article 30. See also language legislation in Belgium.
- South Tyrol, a province of Italy, guarantees equal footing for German and Italian in Article 99 of the Special Statute for Trentino-South Tyrol.
- Alsace and Lorraine, both regions of France, see use of German dialects. Despite EU protection of minority languages, Les Dernières Nouvelles d'Alsace, a Strasbourg newspaper, was forced by restrictive language policy in France to desist its German-language and bilingual print issues. Some articles are still published in German online.
- Denmark's German minority is the only minority recognized according to the Framework Convention for the Protection of National Minorities and the European Charter for Regional or Minority Languages; the minority languages of Faroese and Greenlandic enjoy regional official status.
- Romania has been home to various ethnic groupings for centuries. Since the early 1990s, minority rights of Banat Swabians and Transylvanian Saxons have experienced an upswing.
- Namibia, formerly German South West Africa, recognizes English as its only official language, which according to the 2011 census is the primary language spoken in 3.4% of households. The constitution stipulates that laws, ordinances and court decisions may be published in languages other than English depending on their local prevalence.
