= Der Dativ ist dem Genitiv sein Tod =

Series of books by Bastian Sick

Der Dativ ist dem Genitiv sein Tod (English: The Dative is the Genitive's Death) is a series of books by Bastian Sick that deals in an entertaining manner with unappealing or clumsy use of the German language, as well as areas of contention in grammar, orthography, and punctuation.

== Origins ==
The books are collections of the author’s column "Zwiebelfisch", which appeared from 2003 to 2012 in Spiegel Online. Since February 2005, it also appeared in print in Der Spiegel's monthly culture supplement. The column's title, literally "onion fish", is a printers' term for a single character with an incorrect font in a block of text. The series consists of six volumes, all of which reached the top of the book sales lists, with the first volume selling more than 1.5 million copies within two years.

The title, Der Dativ ist dem Genitiv sein Tod (English: The dative is the death of the genitive, lit. 'The dative is to the genitive its death'), is a way of saying Der Dativ ist der Tod des Genitivs or Der Dativ ist des Genitivs Tod, a reference to a linguistic phenomenon in certain dialects of German where a noun in genitive case is replaced by a possessive adjective and noun in the dative case (see his genitive).

== Reception ==
In several German states, articles from the books have been used officially as teaching materials, and—according to Sick's foreword of August 2005, the series has been added to the set text list for the Abitur in Saarland. The material in the book series has been adapted into a DVD, a board game, a computer game and into audiobooks.

On the other hand, the linguists Vilmos Ágel, Manfred Kaluza and André Meinunger think that Sick's books are not useful for teaching German because they contain factual errors, often just deal with irrelevant nitpicking, and don't give sufficient proof of why something Sick deems wrong should be wrong.

== Book titles ==
- Der Dativ ist dem Genitiv sein Tod – Ein Wegweiser durch den Irrgarten der deutschen Sprache. Kiepenheuer und Witsch, Köln 2004, ISBN 3-462-03448-0 (audio book: ISBN 3-89813-400-8)
- Der Dativ ist dem Genitiv sein Tod, Folge 2 – Neues aus dem Irrgarten der deutschen Sprache. Kiepenheuer und Witsch, Köln 2005, ISBN 3-462-03606-8 (audio book: ISBN 3-89813-445-8)
- Der Dativ ist dem Genitiv sein Tod. Folge 3 – Noch mehr aus dem Irrgarten der deutschen Sprache. Kiepenheuer und Witsch, Köln November 2006, ISBN 3-462-03742-0 (audio book: ISBN 3-89813-566-7)
- Der Dativ ist dem Genitiv sein Tod. Folge 4 – Das Allerneueste aus dem Irrgarten der deutschen Sprache. Kiepenheuer und Witsch, Köln 2009, ISBN 3-462-04164-9
- Der Dativ ist dem Genitiv sein Tod. Folge 5. Kiepenheuer und Witsch, Köln 2013, ISBN 978-3-462-04495-9 (audio book: ISBN 978-3-86231-273-3)
- Der Dativ ist dem Genitiv sein Tod. Folge 6. Kiepenheuer und Witsch, Köln 2015, ISBN 978-3-462-04803-2

== DVD title ==
- Der Dativ ist dem Genitiv sein Tod – Die Große Bastian Sick Schau. [sic] Sony BMG Music Entertainment GmbH, 2008, ASIN B000X1YDCC

== Game titles ==
- Der Dativ ist dem Genitiv sein Tod. KOSMOS, 2006, ASIN 3440690237
- Der Dativ ist dem Genitiv sein Tod – Das PC-Spiel. (PC & Mac) United Soft Media Verlag GmbH, 2007, ASIN 3803228301
