= German verbs =

German verbs may be classified as either weak, with a dental consonant inflection, or strong, showing a vowel gradation (ablaut). Both of these are regular systems. Most verbs of both types are regular, though various subgroups and anomalies do arise; however, textbooks for learners often class all strong verbs as irregular. The only completely irregular verb in the language is sein (to be). There are more than 200 strong and irregular verbs, but just as in English, there is a gradual tendency for strong verbs to become weak.

As German is a Germanic language, the German verbs can be understood historically as a development of the Germanic verbs.

== Bare infinitives ==
The bare infinitive consists of the root and the suffix -en. With verbs whose roots end in el or er, the e of the infinitive suffix is dropped.

laufen 'to run'
lächeln 'to smile'
meistern 'to master'

== Prefixes ==
General overview of the most common German prefixes with their literal English translation

=== Aspect prefixes ===
Prefixes that indicate aspect, result, or combinatorial/additional meaning

Prefix	Verb	Literal meaning	English meaning
auf-	legen	to lay on/up	to hang up the phone; to publish; to apply (makeup); to select and play records; to lay up a ship
aus-	legen	to lay out	to lay out; to display; to interpret
bei-	legen	to lay beside	to add; to enclose
dar-	legen	to lay there	to explain; to set forth
ein-	legen	to lay in	to insert; to inlay
nach-	legen	to lay after	to add more
nieder-	legen	to lay down	to lay down; to resign
über-	legen	to lay over	to consider; to reflect
vor-	legen	to lay for	to present; to submit
weg-	legen	to lay away	to put away; to remove
zusammen-	legen	to lay together	to pool something; to fold washed clothes

=== Directional / Motion Prefixes ===
Prefixes that indicate spatial movement or direction.

Prefix	Verb	Literal gloss	English meaning
hin	legen	to lay downward there	to lie down
her	legen	to lay downward here	to put something here
hinein	legen	to lay inside there	to put into a container
hinaus	legen	to lay outwards	to lie out in the sun

=== Transformative prefixes ===
Prefixes that indicate change, intensity, creative/destructive process, or strong meaning shift

Prefix	Verb	Literal meaning	English meaning
ent-	legen	to lay off	remote; outlying (adjective)
er-	legen	to lay through	to achieve; to bring about; to kill
ge-	legt	having been laid	laid (past participle)
ge-	legen	to be laid	situated; well-timed (adjective)
ver-	legen	to lay off course	to misplace; to publish
zer-	legen	to lay apart	to dismantle
be-	legen		to prove; to cover something; to enroll (for an education course); to reserve (a seat)
um-	legen	to lay around	to reallocate; to shift
wider-	legen	to lay against	to oppose; to disprove
zu-	legen	to lay to	to put on; to acquire

=== Inseparable prefixes ===
There are some verbs which have a permanent prefix at their beginning. These prefixes are never stressed. The most common permanent prefixes found in German are ver-, ge-, be-, er-, ent- (or emp-), and zer-.

brauchen, "to need" – ver-brauchen, "to consume" or "to use up"
raten, "to advise", "to guess" – ver-raten, "to betray"
fallen, "to fall" – ge-fallen "to be pleasing"
hören, "to hear" – ge-hören (zu) "to belong (to)"
brennen, "to burn" (intransitive), to be burning (stative verb) – ver-brennen (etwas), "to burn (something)" (transitive) (action verb), to burn completely
be-ginnen, "to begin" (no form without the prefix) – *ginnen (doesn't exist)

The meaning of the permanent prefixes does not have a real system; the alteration in meaning can be subtle or drastic. The prefixes ver-, be- and ge- have several different meanings, although ge- is uncommon and often the root verb is no longer in existence. be- often makes a transitive verb from an intransitive verb. Verbs with er- tend to relate to creative processes, verbs with ent- usually describe processes of removing (as well as emp-, an approximate equivalent to ent- except usually used for root verbs beginning with an f), and zer- is used for destructive actions. Ver- often describes some kind of extreme or excess of the root verb, although not in any systematic way: 'sprechen', for example means to 'speak', but 'versprechen', 'to promise' as in 'to give one's word' and 'fallen', meaning 'to fall' but 'verfallen', 'to decay' or 'to be ruined'.

=== Separable prefixes ===
Many verbs have a separable prefix that changes the meaning of the root verb, but that does not always remain attached to the root verb. When attached, these prefixes are always stressed. German sentence structure normally places verbs in second position or final position. For separable prefix verbs, the prefix always appears in final position. If a particular sentence's structure places the entire verb in final position then the prefix and root verb appear together. If a sentence places the verb in second position then only the root verb will appear in second position; the separated prefix remains at the end of the sentence.

an-fangen ("to start")
- Root verb in second position: Ich fange mit der Arbeit an. ("I start work.")
- Root verb in final position: Morgens trinke ich Schokolade, weil ich dann mit der Arbeit an-fange. ("In the mornings I drink hot chocolate, because afterwards I begin work.")

Rarely a separable prefix may actually be two (or more) words:

wieder-gut-machen ("to rectify, make up", literally "to make good again")
- Root verb in second position: Sie machte das Unrecht wieder gut. ("She rectified the injustice.")
- Root verb in final position: Ich hoffe, dass du es bei ihm wieder-gut-machst. ("I hope that you're making it up to him.")

A small number of verbs have a prefix that is separable in some uses and inseparable in others.

um-fahren
- ("to drive into [something]") – (stress on um-)

Ich fahre das Verkehrszeichen um. "I drive into the traffic sign, knocking it over (um) in the process."

- ("to drive around") – (stress on fahr)

Ich um-fahre das Verkehrszeichen. "I drive around the traffic sign."

If one of the two meanings is figurative, the inseparable version stands for this figurative meaning:

über-setzen
- Literal ("to ferry") – (stress on über-)

Ich setze morgen auf die Insel über. "I'll ferry over to the island tomorrow."

- Figurative ("to translate") – (stress on setzen)

Ich über-setze die Geschichte morgen. "I'll translate the story tomorrow."

== Complex infinitives ==
=== Components and word order ===
Complex infinitives can be built, consisting of more than the original infinitive. They include objects, predicative nouns and adverbial information. These are packed before the original infinitive, if used isolated. (elliptical)

If one wants to express that they suddenly see a bird (not an airplane);

NOT einen Vogel am Himmel plötzlich sehen ("suddenly see a bird in the sky," as opposed to seeing it slowly – "plötzlich" is stressed)
BUT plötzlich einen Vogel am Himmel sehen ("suddenly see a bird in the sky," as opposed to seeing a plane – "Vogel" is stressed)

Both sentences are correct but they have different focus.

Pronoun objects are usually mentioned before nominal phrase objects; dative nominal objects before accusative nominal objects; and accusative pronoun objects before dative pronouns. Order may change upon emphasis on the object, the first being more important. This can be viewed as a table:

Usual object order
Type	Order	Case
Pronoun	1	Accusative
Pronoun	2	Dative
Nominal	3	Dative
Nominal	4	Accusative

normal
Ich gebe meinem Vater das Geld ("I give my father the money")
Ich gebe es ihm ("I give it to him")
Ich gebe ihm das Geld ("I give him the money")
Ich gebe es meinem Vater ("I give it to my father")
unusual
Ich gebe das Geld meinem Vater ("I give the money to my father")
Ich gebe das Geld ihm ("I give the money to him")
very strange (but still correct)
Ich gebe ihm es ("I give him it")
Ich gebe meinem Vater es ("I give my father it")

Native adverbs, like nicht, leider or gerne, are placed before the innermost verb (see Compound infinitives).

==== Predicative nouns and predicative adjectives ====
A predicative adjective can be the positive, comparative or superlative stem of an adjective, therefore it has the same form as the adverb. One might also use positional phrases or pronominal adverbs.

rot sein ("be red")
bekannt werden ("become well-known")
im Rathaus sein ("be in the town hall")

A predicative noun is a nominal phrase in the nominative case.

Ein Arzt sein ("be a doctor")

Note that, if the subject is singular, the predicative noun must not be plural.

Der Schwarm ist eine Plage (singular/singular) ("the swarm is a pest")
Die Bienen sind Insekten (plural/plural) ("the bees are insects")
Die Bienen sind der Schwarm (plural/singular) ("the bees are the swarm")
*Der Schwarm ist die Bienen (singular/plural)

but instead Der Schwarm ist ein Haufen Bienen ("the swarm is a load of bees")
or Die Bienen sind der Schwarm ("the bees are the swarm") (inversion)

3rd person pronouns are handled like any nominal phrase when used in a predicative way.

1st person or 2nd person pronouns are never used as predicative pronouns.

Normally, one makes an inversion when using a definite pronoun as predicativum.

Der bin ich. (*Ich bin der.) ("I'm the one")
Der bist du. (*Du bist der.) ("You're the one")
Der ist es. (*Es ist der.) ("He's the one")

==== Adverbs ====
One can use any kind of adverbial phrase or native adverb mentioned above. But beware of modal verbs, they change the meaning and phrase of the sentence.

=== Compound infinitives ===
Compound infinitives can be constructed by the usage of modal verbs or auxiliary verbs. One places a new infinitive behind the main infinitive. Then this outer infinitive will be conjugated instead of the old inner infinitive. Sometimes one must turn the old infinitive into a passive participle.

==== Passive infinitive ====
There are two types of passive forms: static passive and dynamic passive. They differ by their auxiliary words. The static passive uses sein, the dynamic passive is formed with werden (which has a slightly different conjugation from its siblings). In both cases, the old infinitive is turned into its passive participle form.

sehen – gesehen sein – gesehen werden ("see – be seen")
plötzlich am Himmel gesehen sein/werden ("suddenly be seen in the sky")

A complex infinitive cannot be turned into passive form, with an accusative object, for obvious reasons. This restriction does not hold for dative objects.

mir den Schlüssel geben ("to give me the key")
NOT mir den Schlüssel gegeben werden
mir gegeben werden ("have been given to me")

The only exceptions are verbs with two accusative objects. In older forms of German, one of these accusative objects was a dative object. This dative object is removed, whereas the real accusative object stays.

Die Schüler die Vokabeln abfragen ("test the students on their vocab")
NOT Die Schüler abgefragt werden
Die Vokabeln abgefragt werden ("the vocab be tested")

==== Perfect infinitives ====
The perfect infinitive is constructed by turning the old infinitive into the passive participle form and attaching the auxiliary verbs haben or sein after the verb.

- sehen – gesehen haben (transitive) ("see" – "saw/have seen")
- einen Vogel sehen – einen Vogel gesehen haben (transitive) ("see a bird –" "saw/have seen a bird")
- laufen – gelaufen sein (intransitive) ("walk – walked/have walked")
- einen schnellen Schritt laufen – einen schnellen Schritt gelaufen sein/haben ("walk at a fast pace" – "walked/have walked at a fast pace")

Note that the perfect infinitive of an intransitive verb is created the same way as the static passive infinitive of a transitive verb.

One can also build perfect infinitives of passive infinitives, both static and dynamic. Since the passive is intransitive, having no accusative object, one must use the auxiliary sein:

- sehen ("to see")
- gesehen worden sein ("to have been seen")
- gesehen geworden sein ("to have been being seen")

sein is used as an auxiliary verb, when the verb is:

- intransitive,
- indicates a movement from one place to another, or
- describes the alteration of a state

haben is used, when

- actually any other case, but could be described more specifically

The use of haben and sein may depend on a sentence's meaning. I have driven the car (Ich habe das Auto gefahren.) is transitive and takes haben, but I have driven to Germany (Ich bin nach Deutschland gefahren.) is intransitive and takes sein because of the position change, even though the verb, fahren, is identical.

==== Future infinitives ====
The future infinitive is more theoretical, because this infinite is only used in finite form. One keeps the old infinitive and appends the verb werden, which in the present tense means 'to become'.

nach Italien fahren 'to drive to Italy' – nach Italien fahren werden 'to be about to drive to Italy'

The future infinitive can also be built by a perfect infinitive, which is used in the future perfect.

den Baum gefällt haben 'to have felled the tree' – den Baum gefällt haben werden 'to be about having felled the tree' (not necessarily soon).

==== Infinitives with modal verbs ====
Modal verbs are verbs that modify other verbs, and as such, are never found alone. Examples may include the following: "may", "must", "should", "want", or "can". Such verbs are utilized by placing the modal infinitive behind the old (passive or perfect) infinitive, without changing any other word. Some modal verbs in German are: können, dürfen, müssen, brauchen, wollen, mögen, lassen.

dorthin fahren können ("to be able to drive there")
nach Rom fahren lassen ("let someone drive to Rome")

A common misunderstanding among English-speakers learning German is caused by a divergence in meaning between English must and German müssen.

Ich muss: "I must"
Ich muss nicht: "I don't have to".

The meaning of must not is conveyed in German with the verb dürfen; "I must not" is therefore translated as ich darf nicht.

==== Accusativus cum infinitivo ====
Like Latin, an accusativus cum infinitivo (ACI) construction is possible. The ACI is formed by placing a bare infinitive after the main verb, and then inserting an accusative object between them. This can be done in two ways:

- Simple ACI
  - Subject – Main verb – Object – Infinitive: Ich sehe dich stolzieren 'I see you strutting'
- Complex ACI
  - Subject – Main verb – Multiple objects – Infinitive: Ich lasse dich ein Haus bauen 'I let you build a house'

=== The zu-infinitive ===
The zu-infinitive has nothing to do with the gerundive, although it is created in a similar way. One simply puts the preposition zu before the bare infinitive, before the permanent prefix, but after the separable prefix.

zu lesen 'to read'
Ich lerne zu lesen 'I learn to read'
zu verlassen 'to leave'
Ich habe beschlossen, dich zu verlassen 'I've decided to leave you'
wegzuwerfen 'to throw away'
Ich habe beschlossen, das Buch wegzuwerfen 'I've decided to throw away the book'

The zu-infinitive extended with um expresses purpose (in order to, for the purpose of). The subject of the main clause and the infinitive must be identical.

Ich habe ein Meer überquert, um dich zu treffen – "I have crossed an ocean to meet you."

== Conjugation ==
There are three persons, two numbers and four moods (indicative, conditional, imperative and subjunctive) to consider in conjugation. There are six tenses in German: the present and past are conjugated, and there are four compound tenses. There are two categories of verbs in German: weak and strong. Some grammars use the term mixed verbs to refer to weak verbs with irregularities. For a historical perspective on German verbs, see Germanic weak verb and Germanic strong verb.

Below, the weak verb kaufen "to buy" and the strong verb singen "to sing" are conjugated.

	Weak verbs		Strong verbs	
	Present	Past	Present	Past
ich	kaufe	kaufte	singe	sang
du	kaufst	kauftest	singst	sangst
er	kauft	kaufte	singt	sang
wir/sie	kaufen	kauften	singen	sangen
ihr	kauft	kauftet	singt	sangt

Common conditional endings in present and past tense: -e, -est, -e, -en, -et, -en

sein "to be" is irregular in the conditional mood

- Present conditional: sei, seist, sei, seien, sei(e)t,
- Past conditional: wäre, wärst, wäre, wären, wär(e)t,

The (e)s are inserted when the stem of the verb ends in:

-chn -d, -dn, -fn, -gn, -t, -tm

The second person singular ending is -t for verbs whose stems end in:

-s, -ß, -x, -z

Examples

beten "to pray": weak transitive verb

- Past Participle: gebetet
- Present: bete, betest, betet, beten, betet,
- Past: betete, betetest, betete, beteten, betetet,

bitten "to ask for, to beg": strong transitive verb

- Past Participle: gebeten
- Present: bitte, bittest, bittet, bitten, bittet,
- Past: bat, bat(e)st, bat, baten, batet,

Some strong verbs change their stem vowel in the second and third person singular of the indicative mood of the present tense.

lesen "to read": strong transitive verb

- Past Participle: gelesen
- Present: lese, liest, liest, lesen, lest,
- Past: las, las(es)t, las, lasen, las(e)t,

=== Auxiliary verbs ===
werden "to become" (strong, irregular)

	Present	Past
ich	werde	wurde
du	wirst	wurdest
er	wird	wurde
wir/sie	werden	wurden
ihr	werdet	wurdet

- Past participle: geworden

haben "to have" (mostly weak, irregular)

Compare the archaic English conjugation:

	Present	Past		Present	Past
ich	habe	hatte	I	have	had
du	hast	hattest	thou	hast	hadst
er	hat	hatte	he	hath	had
wir/sie	haben	hatten	we/they	have	had
ihr	habt	hattet	ye	have	had

- Past participle: gehabt

sein "to be" (suppletive, irregular)

	Present	Past
ich	bin	war
du	bist	warst
er	ist	war
wir/sie	sind	waren
ihr	seid	wart

- Past participle: gewesen

=== Modal verbs ===
- dürfen "to be allowed; may"
- können "to be able; can; to be possible"
- mögen "to like; to want; may"
- müssen "to be required; must"
- sollen "to be supposed to; should"
- wollen "to want (with resolve)"

Modal verbs are inflected irregularly. In the present tense, they use the preterite endings of the strong verbs. In the past tense, they use the preterite endings of the weak verbs. In addition, most modal verbs have a change of vowel in the singular.

	müssen		sollen		wollen		mögen		können		dürfen	
	Present	Past	Present	Past	Present	Past	Present	Past	Present	Past	Present	Past
ich	muss muß	musste mußte	soll	sollte	will	wollte	mag	mochte	kann	konnte	darf	durfte
du	musst mußt	musstest mußtest	sollst	solltest	willst	wolltest	magst	mochtest	kannst	konntest	darfst	durftest
er	muss muß	musste mußte	soll	sollte	will	wollte	mag	mochte	kann	konnte	darf	durfte
wir/sie	müssen	mussten mußten	sollen	sollten	wollen	wollten	mögen	mochten	können	konnten	dürfen	durften
ihr	müsst müßt	musstet mußtet	sollt	solltet	wollt	wolltet	mögt	mochtet	könnt	konntet	dürft	durftet

When a modal verb is in use, the main verb is moved to the end of the sentence.

For example:

- Ich kann das Auto fahren. ("I can drive the car.")
- Ich soll die Karten kaufen. ("I'm supposed to buy the cards.")
- Er muss der Mutter danken. ("He must thank the mother.")
  Note: danken is a dative verb which is why die Mutter becomes der Mutter. For further information, please read the section about dative verbs.

=== Dative verbs ===
Most verbs go with an object in accusative case, similar to a direct object in English. Many verbs can additionally have an object in dative case (similar to an indirect object in English), for example geben "to give". However, some verbs only take a dative object, and these are called "dative verbs". Most dative verbs do not change the object. E.g., when you hit (schlagen) or wound (verletzen) someone, they get a bruise or wound, but when you thank, answer, help, or follow someone, they remain unchanged. There are however exceptions (including even wehtun "hurt"), and there are verbs that are dative verbs in only some senses (e.g. the most common sense "happen" of the very common verb passieren). Dative verbs include the following most common ones:

antworten ("Sie antwortet ihm.")
danken ("Er dankt ihr.")
folgen
gefallen
gehören
glauben
gratulieren
helfen
leidtun
passen
passieren (in the sense of "happen") ("Mir ist heute etwas Verrücktes passiert.") (Something crazy happened to me today. "Etwas Verrücktes" is the subject, "mir" is the dative object)
vertrauen
verzeihen
wehtun
zuhören

=== Reflexive verbs ===
Some verbs require the use of a reflexive pronoun. These verbs are known as reflexive verbs. In English, these are often slightly modified versions of ordinary verbs, such as "to sit down" spoken as "to sit oneself down".

=== Imperative conjugation ===
There is an imperative for second person singular and second person plural, as well as for third person singular and third person plural, as well as for first person plural and second person formal.

The endings for second person singular informal are: -(e), -el or -le, and -er(e).

The endings for second person plural informal are: -(e)t, -elt, and -ert.

Fahren (wir/Sie)! – Fahr(e)! – Fahrt!

The imperative of first person plural and second person formal is identical to the infinitive.

This subtopic is strongly related to the construction of German sentences.

== Participles and verbal nouns ==
This section details the construction of verbal nouns and verbal adjectives from the main infinitive. The processes are the same both for simple and complex infinitives. For complex infinitives, adverbial phrases and object phrases are ignored, they do not affect this process; except something else is mentioned.

=== Past participle ===
There are some irregularities when creating the past participle form.

Weak verbs form their past participles with ge- plus the third person singular form of the verb.

- fragen (er fragt) → gefragt
- passen (es passt) → gepasst
- antworten (er antwortet) → geantwortet
- hören (er hört) → gehört
- fühlen (er fühlt) → gefühlt

Verbs with non-initial stress (practically always the result of an unstressed inseparable prefix, or foreign words ending in stressed -ieren or -eien) do not have ge- added to the verb.

- verführen (er verführt) → verführt
- miauen (er miaut) → miaut
- probieren (er probiert) → probiert
- prophezeien (er prophezeit) → prophezeit

For irregular verbs, the infinitive ending -en remains.

- gelaufen
- gegeben
- gegangen
- geworfen

The separable prefix remains in place.

- weggetragen
- umverteilt

Note: Ich habe den Baum umgefahren (I drove over – crashed into – the tree)
Note: Ich habe den Baum umfahren (I drove around the tree)

The past participles of modal and auxiliary verbs have the same form as their infinitives. But if these verbs are used alone, without an infinitive, they have a regular participle.

Ich habe den Chef besuchen dürfen (Chef = boss) (I was allowed to see the boss)
Ich habe zum Chef gedurft (unusual) (I was allowed in to the boss)

=== Present participle ===
To create the basic form of a present participle, you attach the suffix -d to the infinitive of the verb.

laufen – laufend ("walk" – "walking")
töpfern – töpfernd ("make pottery" – "making pottery")
lächeln – lächelnd ("smile" – "smiling")
verraten – verratend ("betray" – "betraying")
aufbauen – aufbauend ("establish" – "establishing")

=== Future participle or gerundive ===
A gerundive-like construction is fairly complicated to use. The basic form is created by putting the word zu before the infinitive. This is also the adverb.

zu suchen ("to be looked for")
Der Schlüssel ist zu suchen ("the key needs to be looked for")
zu verzeichnen ("to be recorded")
Ein Trend ist zu verzeichnen ("A trend is to be recorded")

The adjective is more complicated. Instead of the infinitive, one uses the present participle, and then declines it corresponding to gender, number, case and article of the nominal phrase. (Compare the German declension of adjectives.)

Der zu suchende Schlüssel ("the key to be looked for")
Ein zu lüftendes Geheimnis ("a secret to be revealed")

=== Agent nouns ===
Agent nouns (e.g. photographer from photograph in English) are constructed by taking the infinitive, removing the ending and replacing it by -er, -ler or -er(er). If the person is a woman, the endings have an extra -in on them. In the explicitly feminine form a second syllable er is omitted, if the infinitive ends on ern or eren.

- infinitive: fahren "to drive"
  - agent noun, masculine: der Fahrer "the (male) driver"
  - agent noun, feminine: die Fahrerin "the female driver"
- infinitive: tischlern "to join (carpentry)"
  - agent noun, masculine: der Tischler "the (male) joiner"
  - agent noun, feminine: die Tischlerin "the female joiner"
- infinitive: verweigern "to refuse"
  - agent noun, masculine: der Verweigerer "the (male) refuser"
  - agent noun, feminine: die Verweiger(er)in "the female refuser"

This form is hard to build for complex infinitives, therefore it is unusual:

- infinitive: weggehen "to go away"

does not usually become der Weggeher or die Weggeherin, but instead Derjenige, der weggeht ("the one going away")

or even

- infinitive: schnell zum Flughafen fahren um die Maschine noch zu erwischen ("to quickly drive to the airport to just catch the flight")

does not usually become: Der Schnell-zum-Flughafen-um-die-Maschine-noch-zu-erwischen-Fahrer ("the quickly-driving-to-the-airport-to-catch-the-flight-driver")

On the other hand, this form is often used in fun or mocking expressions, because the imputed behaviour that is content of the mocking can be merged into a single word. Examples are: Toiletten-Tief-Taucher ("toilet deep diver", which is an alliteration in German), or Mutterficker ("motherfucker"). A whole range of these expressions aim at supposedly weak or conformist behaviour, such as Ampel-bei-Rot-Stehenbleiber ("traffic-lights-on-red-stopper"), Warmduscher ("warm-showerer"), Unterhosen-Wechsler ("underpants changer"), or Schattenparker ("in the shadow parker"). Especially among children there are several fixed terms of this type, like Spielverderber ("game spoiler").

Note: The suffix -er is also used to form instrument nouns, e.g. Salzstreuer and Bohrer also denote instruments.

=== Verbal nouns and deverbatives ===
==== Verbal nouns ====
The two most common forms of verbal nouns are infinitives and gerunds. The bare infinitive, when used as a noun, has no plural (or if it does it is invariable, i.e. identical to the singular), and its gender is neuter.

arbeiten 'to work' – das Arbeiten 'working'

Note: die Arbeiten is not the plural of the verbal noun Arbeiten, it is the plural of the feminine noun die Arbeit.

Example for the plural

"Das Verlegen" kann verschiedene Bedeutungen haben: Das Verlegen einer Sache (die man dann nicht mehr findet); das Verlegen eines Veranstaltungsortes; das Verlegen einer Zeitung; etc. Diese verschiedenen "Verlegen" sind ein gutes Beispiel für den Plural des Gerunds.

Translation:

"'Das Verlegen' can have different meanings: the misplacing of a thing (which you'll never find later), the moving of an event location, the editing of a newspaper, etc. These different 'Verlegen' form a good example of the verbal noun's plural."

Gerunds in -ung are feminine and have regular plurals in -en. They are formed as in English, only the ending is -ung; e.g., ableiten 'to derive' – Ableitung 'derivative (ling.)'; fordern 'to demand; claim' – Forderung 'credit; claim'. While German gerunds formerly served the same function as they do in English, they now have concrete, usually technical meanings. Sometimes the German infinitive and gerund convey the same meaning, but this is rare (e.g. das Laugen – die Laugung, both 'leaching, lixiviation'; das Kleben – die Klebung, both 'chemically bonding, adhering'); usually only the infinitive carries the same meaning as an English gerund. Compare:

handeln 'to act; do business, deal with' – das Handeln 'an act, action; dealing' (in general) – die Handlung 'physical act; deed; operation'
kochen 'to cook' – das Kochen 'cooking' (in general) – die Kochung 'boiling of the boiling scheme' (technical)
schwächen 'to weaken' – das Schwächen 'weakening' (in general) – die Schwächung 'attenuation; debilitation, enfeeblement'

==== Deverbatives ====
One type of deverbative noun is formed by adding -erei (-lerei or -(er)ei) and (sometimes) has a slightly derogatory meaning. The grammatically dependent implication (i.e. independent of context, speech, and syntax) of disapproval for this type of deverbative is rather weak, though present. It must be supported either by context or speech. On the other hand, any positive implication from the context or speech will free the deverbative from any disapproval. Its plural ends in -en, and its gender is feminine.

arbeiten 'to work' – die Arbeiterei 'silly working'
laufen 'to run' – die Lauferei 'running around'
streiten 'to argue' – die Streiterei(en) 'tiff, squabble'
schlemmen 'to feast' – die Schlemmerei(en) 'gormandizing; gluttony'
malen 'to paint' – die Malerei(en) 'doodle(s), goofy portrait'

The above form means a loose, vague abstractum of the verb's meaning. It is also often used to designate a whole trade, discipline or industry, or a single business/enterprise:

die Meierei 'dairy farm'
malen 'to paint' – die Malerei 'a painting' (work of art), or 'painters' business'

In this form the plural is used just as with any other noun. Cf. also Metzgerei, Fleischerei 'butcher's shop', Malerei (a business of professional painters (of rooms and buildings)) are not derived from verbs.

Similar to the form presented above, one may place the prefix ge- (after the separable prefix), if the verb doesn't have a permanent prefix, and then attach the ending -e ( -el, -er ). Most times, this noun indicates slightly more disapproval than the other one (depending in the same way on context, speech etc.). Its gender is neuter.

fahren 'to drive' – das Gefahre 'silly driving'
laufen 'to run' – das Gelaufe 'running around (like a child at play)'

A plural form does not exist. To indicate the reference to all instances the pronoun/numeral all can be added, as in the following example:

- Mother to child: Hör mit dem Geschaukel auf! ("Stop that rocking!")
- Child rocks in a different manner
- Mother: Hör mit allem Geschaukel auf! ("Stop all rockings!")

However, a more formal reference to all instances would be Hör mit jeder Form von Geschaukel auf! ("Stop any form of rocking!") instead. So this use of all is merely encountered in colloquial conversations.

If this type of deverbative is used to express disapproval, it is typically augmented by the prefix herum- or (short form) rum- to make it sound/look even more disapproving. For example: Das stundenlange Herumgefahre im Bus geht mir total auf die Nerven. ("The silly driving around for hours in the bus is totally getting on my nerves.")

These forms are hard to build for complex infinitives; therefore they are unusual. When they occur, all object phrases and adverbial phrases are put before the verbal noun:

von Allen gesehen werden "to be seen by everyone" – Das Von-Allen-gesehen-Werden "being seen by everyone"

== Tenses ==
Although there are six tenses in German, only two are simple; the others are compound and therefore build on the simple constructions. The tenses are quite similar to English constructions.

Conjugation includes three persons, two numbers (singular and plural), three moods (indicative, imperative and subjunctive), and two simple tenses (present and Preterite). The subjunctive of the present is almost never used in colloquial German (and relatively infrequent in written German as well); the subjunctive of the past is more common, at least for some frequent verbs (ich wäre, ich hätte, ich käme etc.). The latter is used like a conditional mood in German (English: I would).

Unlike English, German tenses do not carry aspect information. There are no progressive tenses in standard German. Das Mädchen geht zur Schule may mean "The girl goes to school" as well as "The girl is going to school". One must use an adverb to make a visible difference aside from the context. If one wishes to emphasize that the action is occurring at this very moment, the adverb gerade can be used. The previous sentence can be written: Das Mädchen geht gerade zur Schule.

In colloquial spoken German, in particular in the Rhineland and Ruhr areas, a present progressive tense does exist and is known as the rheinische Verlaufsform. It is formed with the verb sein ("to be") + am ("at the") + verbal noun. For example: Ich bin am Essen. – I am eating; Ich bin das Auto am Reparieren. – I'm fixing the car. However, this form is rarely used in writing and is not used in formal spoken German.

A formal alternative for a progressive tense is the construction sein ("to be") + dabei zu + infinitive. For example: Ich bin dabei ihm zu helfen. – I am helping him.

As is shown in the following, German is not very rigid in its usage of tenses. More precise tenses are available to express certain temporal nuances, but both of the most common tenses (present tense and perfect tense) can often be used instead if the context is unambiguous.

- Present (Präsens) – It is the present-conjugated form of the infinitive. It is the most important tense in German. The Present tense is mainly used for simple present, present progressive, as well as for future. It is also used for historical past.
  Example: Ich kaufe das Auto. ("I buy the car")
- Preterite (Präteritum, in older works Imperfekt) – It is the past-conjugated form of the infinitive. This past tense is mainly used in written German and formal speech, except for some frequent verbs whose preterite forms are common colloquially (such as ich war, ich hatte, ich kam). It is also used for past progressive. Otherwise, the perfect is much preferred in colloquial language, but in northern regions of Germany it is more frequently used.
  Example: Ich kaufte das Auto. ("I bought the car")
- Perfect (Perfekt) – It is the present-conjugated form of the perfect infinitive. This tense has (widely) the same meaning as the preterite and very often replaces the latter in colloquial German. An English perfect tense is often expressed by the present in German. For example, "I have lived in Germany for three years now." → Ich lebe jetzt seit drei Jahren in Deutschland. (Literally "I live now for three years in Germany.")
  Example: Ich habe das Auto gekauft. ("I (have) bought the car")
- Pluperfect / past perfect (Plusquamperfekt) – It is the past-conjugated form of the perfect infinitive. It can be thought of as the perfect form of the preterite, used to describe what already had happened at a certain point in the past. If the context is unambiguous, the perfect or preterite may be used instead (as in English).
  Example: Ich hatte das Auto gekauft. ("I had bought the car")
- Future (Futur I) – It is the present-conjugated form of the future infinitive. It generally describes the future but may also express an assumption for the present. In contrast to English, the future tense is usually replaced by the present tense if the future meaning is already evident from the context. For example, "In ten years I'll be old" → In zehn Jahren bin ich alt. (Literally: "In ten years am I old.") This is particularly common in colloquial German but is also correct in writing.
  Example: Ich werde das Auto kaufen. ("I will buy the car")
- Future perfect (Futur II) – It is the present-conjugated form of the future infinitive of the perfect infinitive. It describes what will have happened at a certain point in the future (past of the future), but the simple perfect, or even present (and by a common pupils' mistake, Futur I, but that is universally judged to be incorrect), is preferred instead if the future meaning is evident from the context. More commonly, the future perfect expresses an assumption for the past: Er wird einen Unfall gehabt haben. ("He will [probably] have had an accident.")
  Example: Ich werde das Auto gekauft haben. ("I'll have bought the car")

== Colloquial contractions between verb and personal pronoun ==
- Although not part of the standard language, nearly all varieties of colloquial German feature contracted forms in which a verb and a following (unstressed) personal pronoun become one word.

This is frequent in the 2nd person singular, where the verb ending -st and the pronoun du ("you") are contracted into -ste [-stə].

bist du → biste ("are you")
hast du → haste ("have you")
glaubst du → glaubste ("believe you"/"do you believe")

These forms are common in informal writing. Regionally, there may be different outcomes of the contraction. In western Germany, -t- might be lost as well, resulting in bisse, hasse and the like. In Upper German regions, the phenomenon often goes so far as to delete the pronoun completely, which gives rise to the Austro-Bavarian bist, hast (Note: Note: the pronoun is here not deleted but attached to the verb with whose final sound it is identical. That is not by a surprise since the very ending -st stems from the attachment of the pronoun du to the old verb ending -s. For example, Old High German biris du became biristu and was then re-interpreted as birist du. (The same occurred in English with the old pronoun thou.) Western German dialects and accents, however, still use the original simple -s. For example, du bist is often pronounced du bis in the West.) and the Alemannic bisch, hasch.

- Similar contractions exist for the formal 2nd person and the 3rd person plural, both of which use the pronoun sie/Sie.

können sie → könnse ("can you/they")
haben sie → hamse ("have you/they")
schauen sie → schaunse ("look you/they")

Again, shortened forms such as könn(en)s, hams are used in the South. They are often spelt können's, ham's or können S', ham S' in informal writing.

- In Upper and Central German regions but only sporadically in originally Lower German areas, there are also contracted forms for the 1st person plural. They usually end in -mer [-mɐ]. The reason is that the Upper and Central German dialects have traditionally used mir instead of wir ("we"). This form mir is itself due to an old contraction of the Middle High German verb ending -em and the following pronoun wir (e.g. loufem wir → loufe‿mir)

sind wir → simmer ("are we")
haben wir → hammer ("have we")
glauben wir → glaub(e)mer ("believe we"/"do we believe")

In parts of northern Germany, less distinct contractions such as sindwer, hamwer occur instead of the southern/central simmer, hammer.
