= Bastian Sick =

German journalist and author (born 1965)

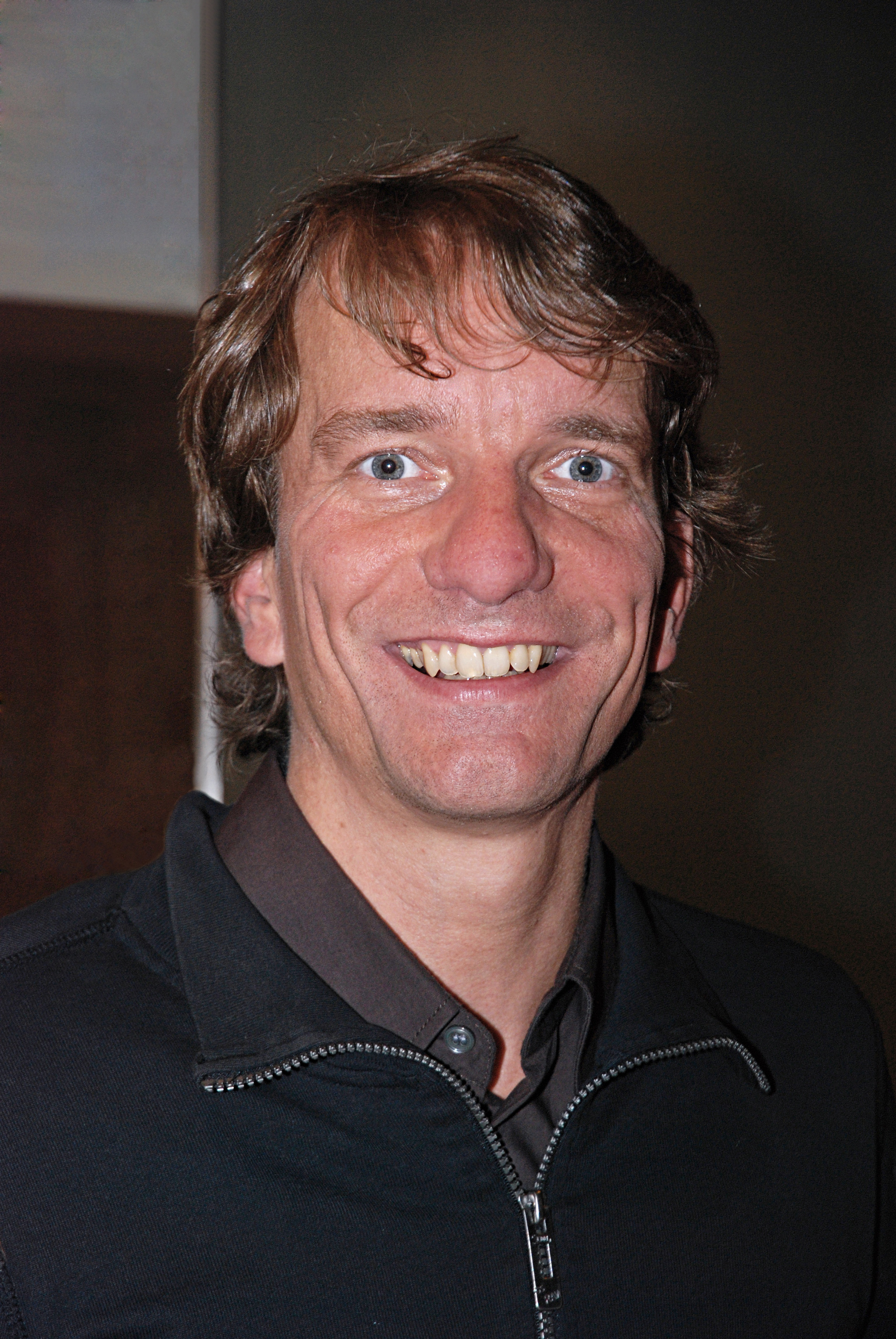
- Born: 17 July 1965 (age 61); Lübeck, Schleswig-Holstein
- Education: University of Hamburg
- Occupations: columnist, author
- Writing career
- Notable work: Der Dativ ist dem Genitiv sein Tod
- Website: http://www.bastiansick.de/

Bastian Sick (German: [ˈbastjaːn ˈzɪk]; born 17 July 1965) is a German journalist and author.

== Biography ==
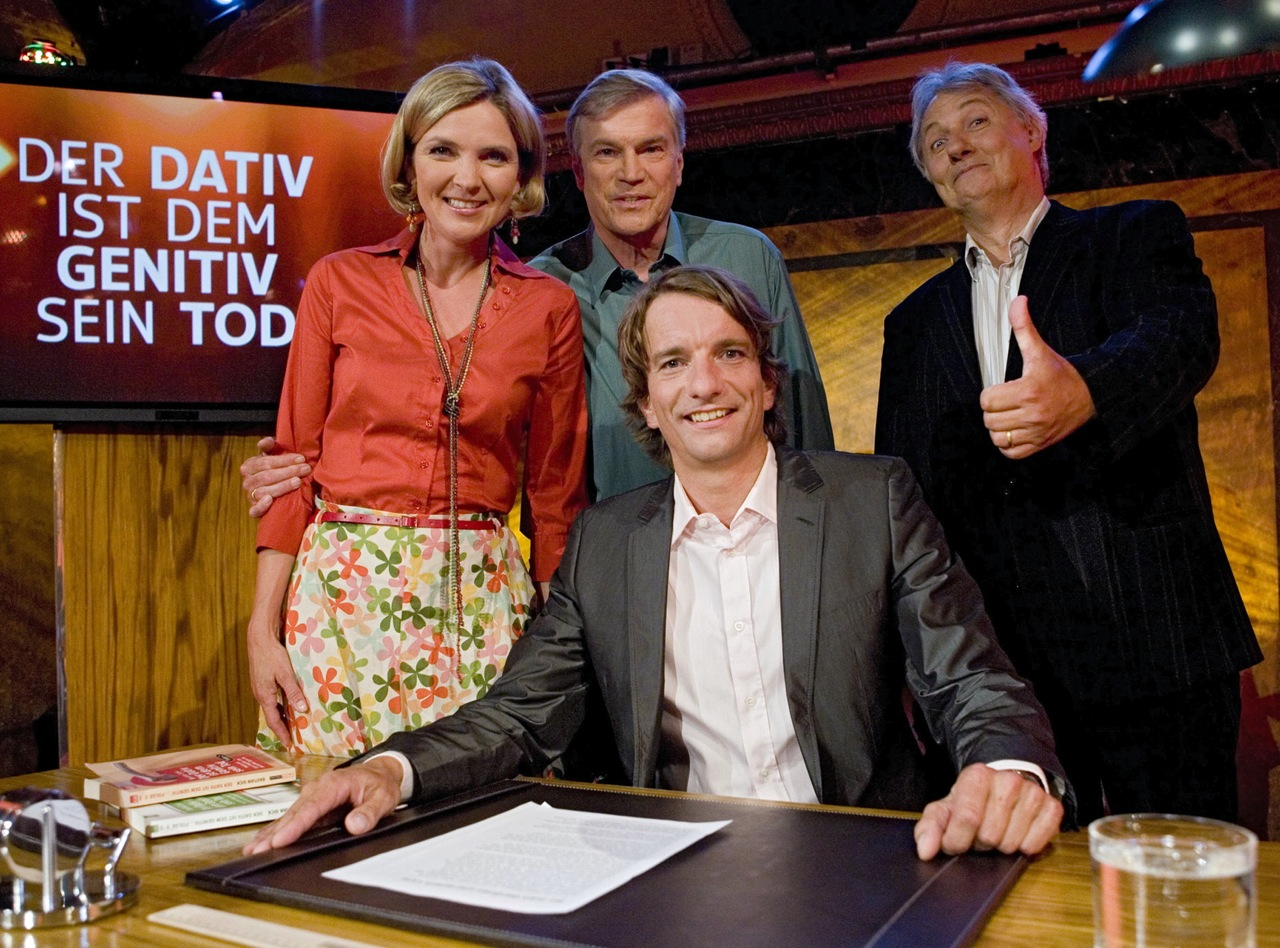
Bastian Sick with Susanne Pätzold, Jochen Busse and Konrad Beikircher at the Bastian Sick Show, 06/11/2008

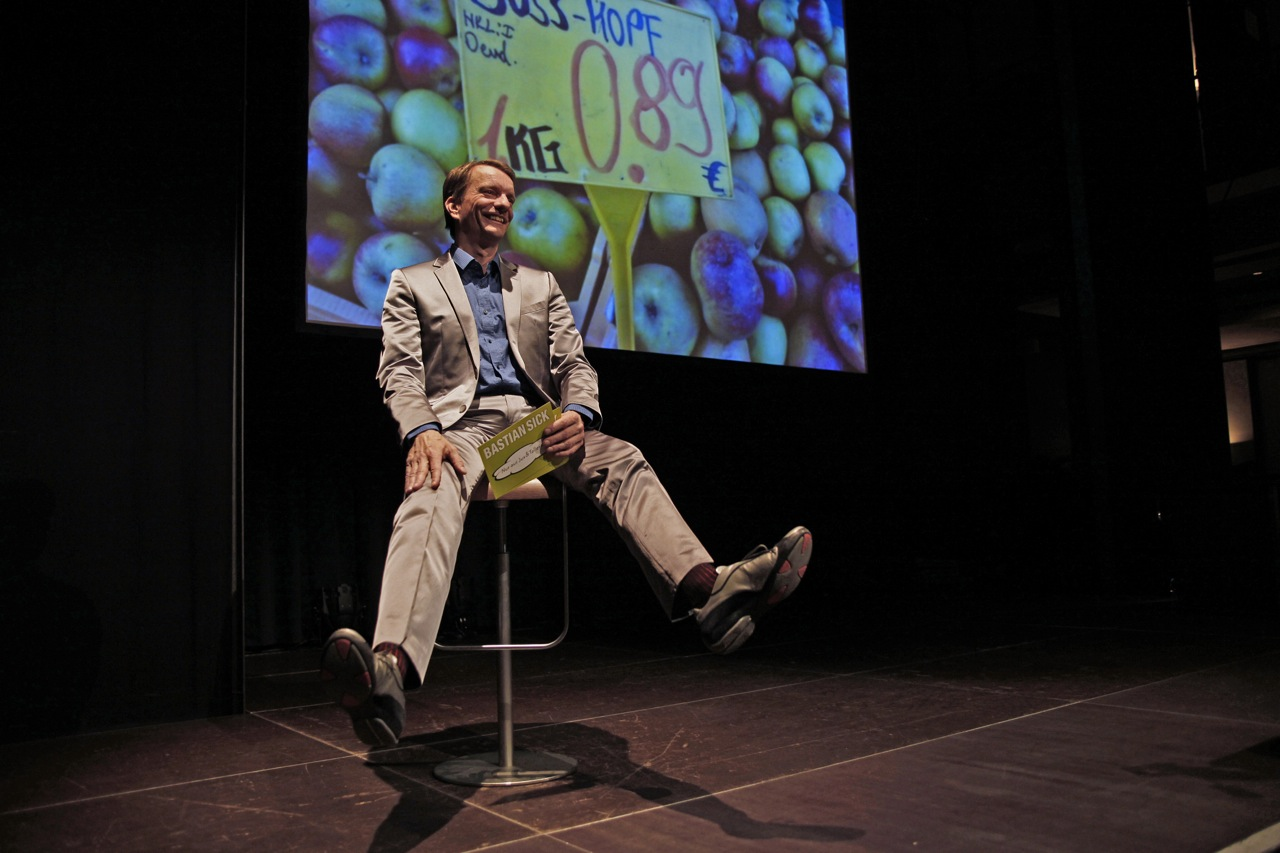
Bastian Sick on tour with Nur aus Jux und Tolleranz, Mainz, Germany, 02/04/2012

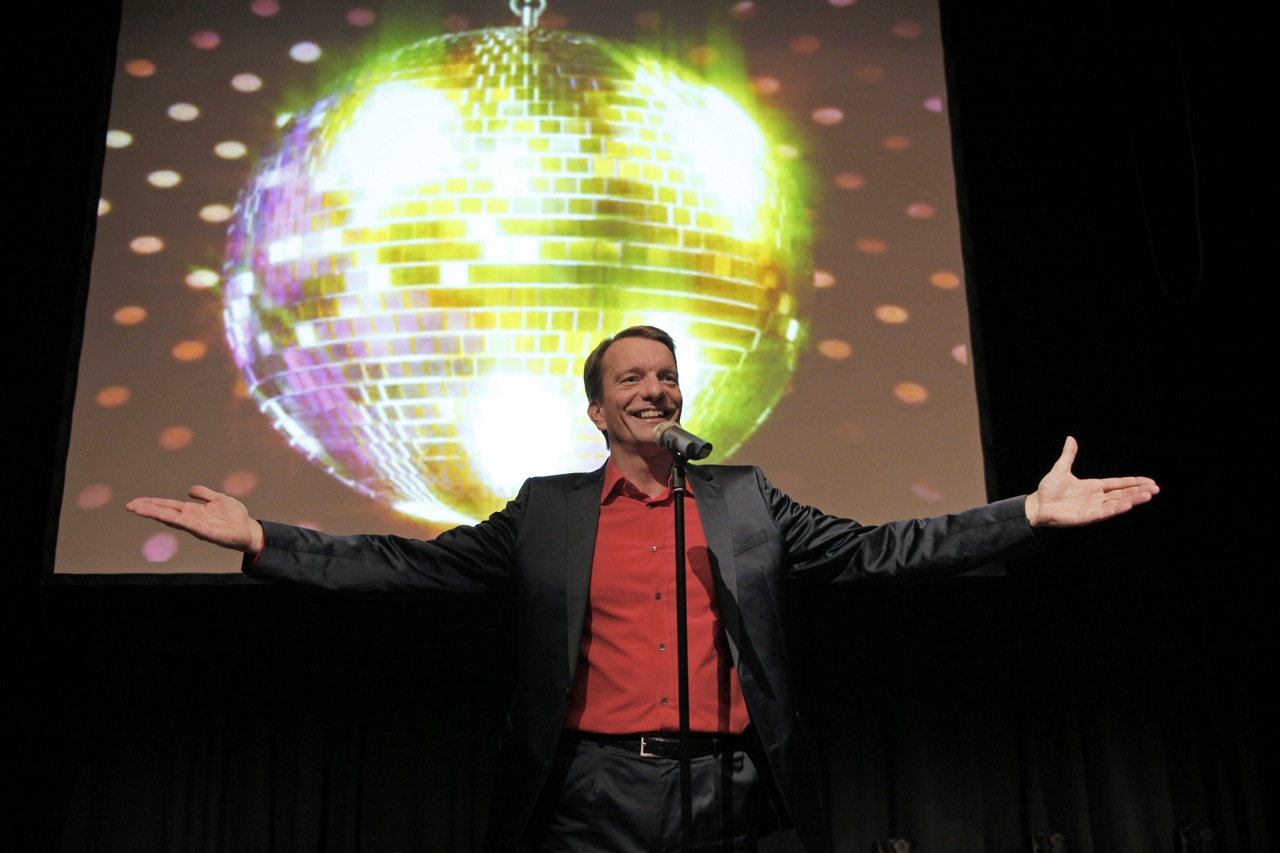
Bastian Sick on tour with Nur aus Jux und Tolleranz, Mainz, Germany, 02/04/2012

Bastian Sick grew up in Ratekau, in the north of Germany near Lübeck, and attended the Leibniz-Gymnasium in Bad Schwartau where he did his Abitur (A-level) in 1984. After his military service, he studied History and Romance Philology. He graduated Magister Artium. During his studies he worked as a corrector and translator for the Carlsen-Verlag. Sick explains in the foreword of the Carlsen anniversary issue "Spirou & Fantasio" that the work experience as a translator and corrector honed his sense for orthography and punctuation.

In 1995, Bastian Sick started working as a documentation journalist in the photo archive of German news magazine Der Spiegel. In 1999 he joined the editorial team of the magazine "Spiegel online" and became a literary editor. In 2003 he became famous as the author of the column "Zwiebelfisch". In those columns, he writes in a funny and entertaining way about the case of doubt in the German language, for example, grammar, spelling, punctuation, and style.

In 2004, 50 of these columns were published as Der Dativ ist dem Genitiv sein Tod. More than two million copies of this book were sold within two years. Two sequels have been published within the same time period. The "Zwiebelfisch" was the first Internet column which became a bestseller after it was published as a book. Besides his columns, Bastian Sick published other books about language curiosities, for instance, "Happy Aua", part 1–4. From the content of the book series "Der Dativ ist dem Genitiv sein Tod" board games, computer games and calendars were produced.

Sick has done several tours of reading where he also performed as an entertainer. On the 13 of March 2006, Bastian Sick performed in the Cologne Arena in front of an audience of 15.000 people in "the biggest German lesson of the world". He was supported e.g. by Thomas Bug, Joachim Hermann Luger, Jürgen Rüttgers, Frank Plasberg, Frank Rost, Cordula Stratmann, and Annette Frier. Recordings from this event and recordings from his tours were published as audiobooks. Invited by the Sony BMG in 2007, Bastian Sick published a CD called "Lieder voller Poesie," an homage to the musician and singer Udo Jürgens.

In 2008, Sick hosted a temporary TV show on WDR. With artists like Jochen Busse, Konrad Beikircher, and Susanne Pätzold, Sick presented in his thirty-minute show oddities out of the language every-day life. In the following year, Sick left the Spiegel publishing company and became a self-employed author and speaker. With his program "Nur aus Jux und Tolleranz" he went on tour through Germany in 2011 and 2013. Invited by the Goethe Institute, German schools and other educational establishments Sick did many performances in foreign countries, for example in Montréal (Canada), Hungary, Spain, Portugal, South Tyrol (Italy), Great Britain, and Egypt. He also did a tour in South America with eight performances in six countries in 2008.

Bastian Sick lives and works in Hamburg.

== Notable works ==
=== Books ===
- Der Dativ ist dem Genitiv sein Tod. Ein Wegweiser durch den Irrgarten der deutschen Sprache. Kiepenheuer und Witsch, Köln 2004, ISBN 3-462-03448-0. (Hörbuch: ISBN 3-89813-400-8)
- Der Dativ ist dem Genitiv sein Tod. Folge 2. Neues aus dem Irrgarten der deutschen Sprache. Kiepenheuer und Witsch, Köln 2005, ISBN 3-462-03606-8. (Hörbuch: ISBN 3-89813-445-8)
- Der Dativ ist dem Genitiv sein Tod. Folge 3. Noch mehr Neues aus dem Irrgarten der deutschen Sprache. Kiepenheuer und Witsch, Köln 2006, ISBN 3-462-03742-0. (Hörbuch: ISBN 3-89813-566-7)
- Der Dativ ist dem Genitiv sein Tod. Folge 4. Das Allerneueste aus dem Irrgarten der deutschen Sprache. Kiepenheuer und Witsch, Köln 2009, ISBN 978-3-462-04164-4.
- Der Dativ ist dem Genitiv sein Tod. Folge 5. Kiepenheuer und Witsch, Köln 2013, ISBN 978-3-462-04495-9.
- Der Dativ ist dem Genitiv sein Tod. Folge 6. Kiepenheuer und Witsch, Köln 2015, ISBN 978-3-462-30998-0.
- Füllen Sie sich wie zu Hause. Ein Bilderbuch aus dem Irrgarten der deutschen Sprache. Kiepenheuer und Witsch, Köln 2014, ISBN 978-3-462-04700-4.
- Happy Aua. Ein Bilderbuch aus dem Irrgarten der deutschen Sprache. Kiepenheuer und Witsch, Köln 2007, ISBN 978-3-462-03903-0.
- Happy Aua 2. Ein Bilderbuch aus dem Irrgarten der deutschen Sprache. Kiepenheuer und Witsch, Köln 2008, ISBN 978-3-462-04028-9.
- Hier ist Spaß gratiniert. Ein Bilderbuch aus dem Irrgarten der deutschen Sprache. Kiepenheuer und Witsch, Köln 2010, ISBN 978-3-462-04223-8.
- Wegweiser durch den Irrgarten der deutschen Sprache. Kiepenheuer und Witsch, Köln 2012, ISBN 978-3-7607-8738-1.
- Wie gut ist Ihr Deutsch? Der große Test. Kiepenheuer und Witsch, Köln 2011, ISBN 978-3-462-04365-5.
- Wie gut ist ihr Deutsch? 2. Der neue große Test Kiepenheuer und Witsch, Köln 2019, ISBN 978-3-462-05204-6.
- Wie gut ist Ihr Deutsch? 3 Dem großen Test sein dritter Teil. Kiepenheuer und Witsch, Köln 2021, ISBN 978-3-462-00131-0.
- Wir braten Sie gern! Ein Bilderbuch aus dem Irrgarten der deutschen Sprache. Kiepenheuer und Witsch, Köln 2013, ISBN 978-3-462-04574-1.
- Wir sind Urlaub! Das Happy-Aua-Postkartenbuch. Kiepenheuer und Witsch, Köln 2010, ISBN 978-3-462-04267-2.

== CDs ==
- Der Dativ ist dem Genitiv sein Tod. Read by Rudolf Kowalski, Der Audio Verlag (DAV), Berlin, 2005, ISBN 978-3-89813-400-2 (Lesung, 2 CDs, 153 Min.)
- Der Dativ ist dem Genitiv sein Tod, Folge 2. Read by Bastian Sick, Der Audio Verlag (DAV), Berlin, 2005, ISBN 978-3-89813-445-3 (Lesung, 2 CDs, 151 Min.)
- Der Dativ ist dem Genitiv sein Tod, Folge 3. Read by Bastian Sick, Der Audio Verlag (DAV), Berlin, 2006, ISBN 978-3-89813-566-5 (Lesung, 2 CDs, 146 Min.)
- Bastian Sick Live. Der Audio Verlag (DAV), Berlin, 2007, ISBN 978-3-89813-646-4 (Live-Show, 1 CD, 76 Min.)
- "Happy Aua" - Tour 2008. Der Audio Verlag (DAV), Berlin, 2008, ISBN 978-3-89813-737-9 (Live-Show, 1 CD, 73 Min.)
- Der Dativ ist dem Genitiv sein Tod, Folge 4. Read by Bastian Sick, Der Audio Verlag (DAV), Berlin, 2009, ISBN 978-3-89813-881-9 (Lesung, 2 CDs, 159 Min.)
- Der Dativ ist dem Genitiv sein Tod, Folge 5. Read by Bastian Sick, Der Audio Verlag (DAV), Berlin, 2012, ISBN 978-3-86231-273-3 (Lesung, 2 CDs, 168 Min.)

=== Singles ===
- Keine andere Sprache. 2014. Music and lyrics: Bastian Sick. ASIN: B00K6I4KXY
- Würde Goethe heut noch leben. 2014. Music and lyrics: Bastian Sick. ASIN: B00K6I6WIA
