= Konrad Beikircher =

German cabaret artist, musician and author (1945–2026)

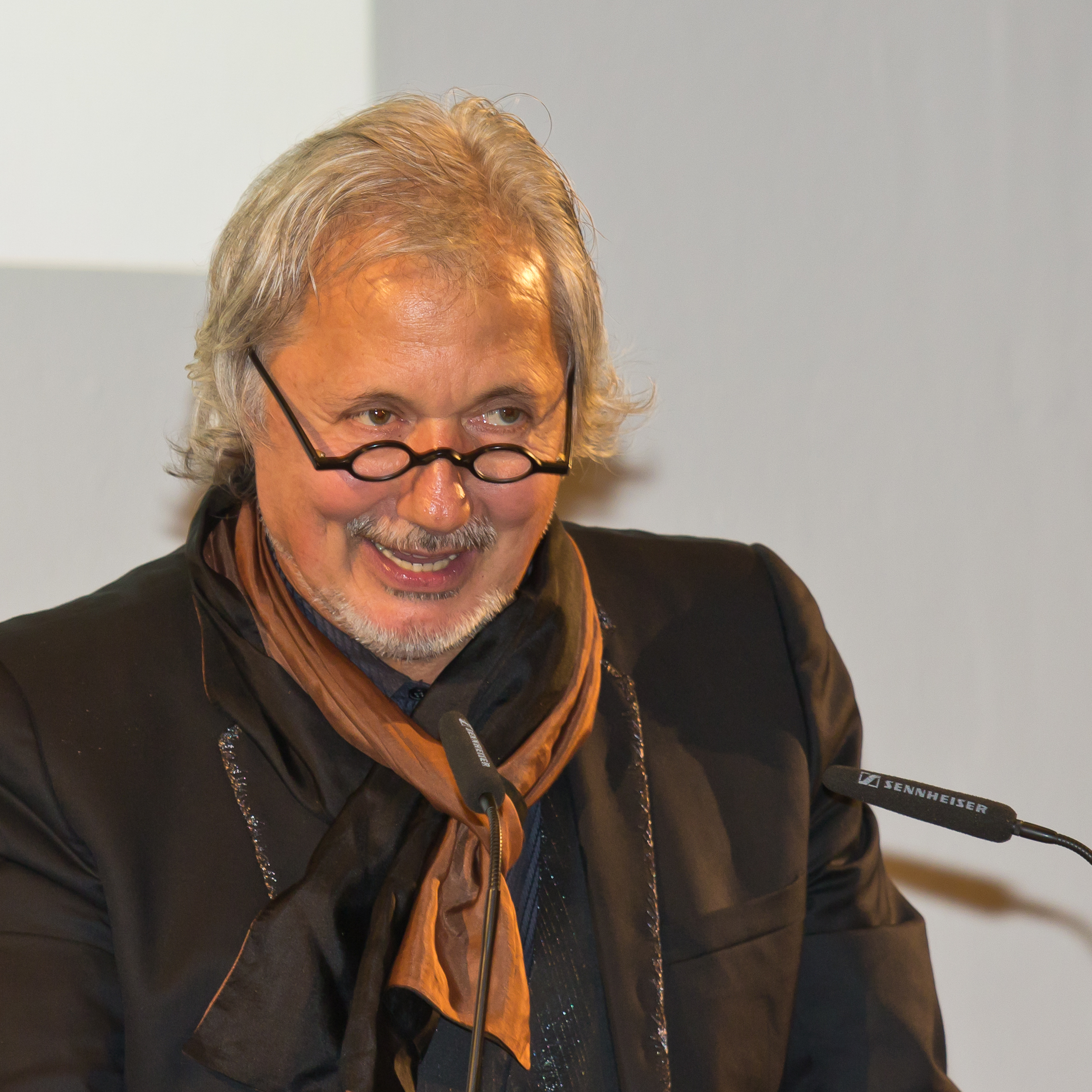
- Born: Konrad Johann Aloysia Beikircher; 22 December 1945; Bruneck, South Tyrol, Italy
- Died: 28 July 2026 (aged 80); Bonn, North Rhine-Westphalia, Germany
- Education: University of Bonn
- Occupations: Cabaret artist; musician; author
- Years active: 1978–2026
- Spouse: Anne Siering-Beikircher (m. 1989)
- Children: 5

Konrad Johann Aloysia Beikircher (22 December 1945 – 28 July 2026) was a German cabaret artist, musician and author. Born in South Tyrol, he was known for stage programmes, books, and recordings that explore the character, mentality and regional dialect of the Rhineland.

== Early life and education ==
Beikircher was born in Bruneck, South Tyrol, the youngest son of Adolf Beikircher, who headed the municipal power station in the town, and Flora von Ingram. The opera singer Ivo Ingram Beikircher and the classical philologist Hugo Beikircher are his brothers, and the conductor Lukas Beikircher is his nephew.

In 1964 he moved to Vienna to study psychology and journalism. In 1965 he transferred to the University of Bonn, where he studied psychology, musicology and philosophy. After graduating as a Diplom psychologist, he worked from 1971 as a prison psychologist at Siegburg Prison. In 1986, he left to work as a freelance cabaret artist.

== Career ==
Beikircher made his stage debut on 28 March 1978 at the Jazz-Galerie in Bonn.

His best-known body of work is the Rheinische Trilogie ("Rhenish Trilogy"), a series of recorded programmes about the Rhineland that he expanded from the late 1980s onward. In 2025, he announced a farewell tour titled Arrivederci and said he intended to end his stage performances at the end of 2026.

== Personal life and death ==
Beikircher's first wife died in 1981. He married again and separated from his second wife in 1986. From 1989, he was married to the artist Anne Siering-Beikircher. He had two children from his second marriage and three from his third. He lived in the Schweinheim district of Bad Godesberg, Bonn.

Beikircher died on 28 July 2026, at the age of 80.

== Awards and honours ==
Beikircher received several honours for his engagement with regional dialect and the Rhenish regiolect:

- 1988: Morenhovener Lupe
- 1993: Rheinlandtaler
- 2002: Friedestrompreis
- 2005: Großer Kulturpreis of the Sparkassen-Kulturstiftung Rheinland (endowed with €30,000) and the Krefelder Krähe
- 2006: KölnLiteraturPreis
- 2012: Cross of Merit, First Class (Bundesverdienstkreuz 1. Klasse)

== Selected works ==
=== Books ===
- Et kütt wie et kütt. Das rheinische Grundgesetz (Kiepenheuer & Witsch, 2001)
- Andante Spumante. Ein Konzertführer (Kiepenheuer & Witsch, 2001)
- Scherzo furioso. Der neue Konzertführer (Kiepenheuer & Witsch, 2003)
- Palazzo Bajazzo. Ein Opernführer (Kiepenheuer & Witsch, 2004)
- Bohème supreme. Der neue Opernführer (Kiepenheuer & Witsch, 2007)
- Wer weiß, wofür et jot es (Kiepenheuer & Witsch, 2009)
- Als Strohhalme noch aus Stroh waren: Eine Kindheit in Südtirol (autobiography, Kiepenheuer & Witsch, 2012)
- Pasticcio Capriccio. Der allerneueste Opernführer (Kiepenheuer & Witsch, 2017)

=== Recordings ===
- Himmel un Ääd – Rheinisch beim Wort genommen (Eichborn, 1991), part of the Rheinische Trilogie
- Wie isset? … Jot! (Eichborn, 1997)
- Ja sicher! – Rheinisch überleben dank Konrad Beikircher (Roof Music, 2001)
- Andante Spumante. Ein Konzertführer (Roof Music, 2002)
- Scherzo furioso. Der neue Konzertführer (Roof Music, 2003)
- Palazzo Bajazzo. Ein Opernführer (Roof Music, 2004)
- Celentano. Una festa sui prati (Roof Music, 2005)
- Die rheinische Neunte (2007)
- Am schönsten isset, wenn et schön is! (Roof Music, 2009)
