= List of encyclopedias in German =

This is a list of encyclopedias in the German language. (Note: For the purposes of this list, the German terms Enzyklopädie, Lexikon and Konversations-Lexikon are all translated as "encyclop(a)edia".)

Printed (paper)
Digital (online)
Both*

*This usually means that volumes of the encyclopaedia were originally printed on paper, but at some point (usually in the 1990s or early 2000s), the encyclopaedia has been digitised and made available in whole or in part in electronic form (usually online, but not necessarily). New entries may or may not be added, while old entries (originally printed) may or may not be updated. Usually, publication of paper-printed editions has been discontinued.

Title in German	Title in English	Published
Abrogans	German Abrogans	c. 765–775
Agent*In	Anti-Gender-Networks-Information	2017
Allgemeine Encyclopädie der Wissenschaften und Künste	General Encyclopaedia of Sciences and Arts	1818–1889
Die österreichisch-ungarische Monarchie in Wort und Bild	The Austro-Hungarian Monarchy in Word and Picture	1886–1902
Brehms Tierleben	Brehm's Animal Life	1864–1869
Brockhaus Enzyklopädie	Brockhaus Encyclopaedia	1796–present
Conversations-Lexikon mit vorzüglicher Rücksicht auf die gegenwärtigen Zeiten	Encyclopaedia with Special Regard to the Present Times	1796–1808
Der kleine Brockhaus	The Little Brockhaus	1925–1961
Deutsche Biographische Enzyklopädie	German Biographical Encyclopaedia	1995–2008
Deutsches Kolonial-Lexikon	German Colonial Encyclopaedia	1920, 2006
Deutsches Theater-Lexikon	German Theatrical Encyclopaedia	1953–2015
Enzyklopädie des Lebens (Note: Available online in 19 languages, one of which is German.)	Encyclopedia of Life	2008–present
Evangelisches Kirchenlexikon	Evangelical Church Encyclopaedia	1986–2003
Enzyklopädie des Märchens	Encyclopedia of Fairy Tales	1977–2015
Die Ehre deß Hertzogthums Crain	The Glory of the Duchy of Carniola	1689
Glottopedia (Note: Available online in several languages, one of which is German.)	Glottopedia	2007–present
Grosses vollständiges Universal-Lexicon aller Wissenschafften und Künste	Great Complete Encyclopedia of All Sciences and Arts	1731–1754
Historisches Lexikon der Schweiz (Note: Published in German, French, Italian, and an abridged edition in Romansh.)	Historical Dictionary of Switzerland	1998–present
Historisches Lexikon des Fürstentums Liechtenstein	Historical Lexicon of the Principality of Liechtenstein	2013–present
Historisch-kritisches Wörterbuch des Marxismus	Historical-Critical Dictionary of Marxism	1994–present
Killy Literaturlexikon: Autoren und Werke des deutschsprachigen Kulturraumes	Killy's Literary Encyclopaedia: Authors and Works of the German-Speaking Cultural Region	1988–2012
Kirchliches Handlexikon (Note: Full title: Kirchliches Handlexikon: ein Nachschlagebuch über das Gesamtgebiet der Theologie und ihrer Hilfswissenschaften. "Church Handbook: A Reference Book on the Entire Field of Theology and its Auxiliary Sciences".)	Church Handbook	1904–1912
Encyklopädie der mathematischen Wissenschaften	Klein's Encyclopedia of Mathematical Sciences	1898–1933
Klexikon (Kinder-Lexicon)	Klexikon (Children's Encyclopaedia)	2014–present
Komponisten der Gegenwart	Contemporary Composers	1992–present
Kürschners Deutscher Gelehrten-Kalender	Kürschner's Encyclopedia of German Scholars	1925–2016
Kürschners Deutscher Literatur-Kalender	Kürschner's Encyclopedia of German Literature	1879–present
Kürschners Handbücher	Kürschners Handbooks	1879–present
Lexikon der gesamten Technik	Encyclopaedia of all Technology	1894–1972
Lexikon des Mittelalters	Encyclopaedia of the Middle Ages	1980–present
Lexikon für Theologie und Kirche	Lexicon of Theology and the Church	1930–2001
Meyers Blitz-Lexikon	Meyers Lightning-Encyclopaedia	1928–1940
Meyers Konversations-Lexikon	Meyers Encyclopaedia	1839–1984
Munzinger-Archiv	Munzinger Archive	1913–present
Die Musik in Geschichte und Gegenwart	Music in the Past and Present	1949–present
Oeconomische Encyclopädie	Economic Encyclopaedia	1773–1858
Orbis Pictus (Note: Originally published in Latin in 1658. Best known for its 1666 quadrilingual edition in Latin, German, Italian and French. Many other editions and translations were published.)	Orbis Pictus	1658–1780
Der Ort des Terrors	The Place of Terror	2005–2009
Oesterreichisches Musiklexikon	Austrian Music Lexicon	2002–present
Real-Encyclopädie der classischen Alterthumswissenschaft	Practical Encyclopaedia of Classical Antiquity Studies	1839–2012
Reallexikon der Assyriologie und Vorderasiatischen Archäologie	Practical Encyclopaedia of Assyriology and Ancient Near Eastern Archaeology	1922–2018
Riemann Musiklexikon	Riemann Music Encyclopaedia	1882–2012
Schweizer biographisches Archiv (Note: Published in German, French, and Italian.)	Swiss Biographical Archive	1952–1958
Theologische Realenzyklopädie	Theological Practical Encyclopaedia	1977–2004
Verfasserlexikon	Author Encyclopaedia	1933–2008
Alemannischi Wikipedia	Alemannic Wikipedia	2003–present
Deutschsprachige Wikipedia	German Wikipedia	2001–present
Wikipedia op Ripoarisch Platt	Ripuarian Wikipedia	2005–present
