= Peter Hille =

German author (1854–1904)

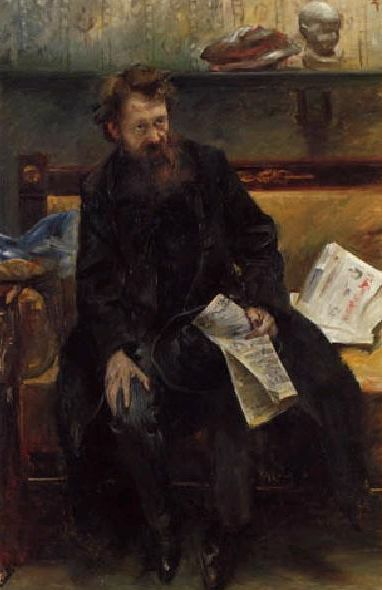
Peter Hille, painting by Lovis Corinth, 1902

Peter Hille (11 September 1854 – 7 May 1904) was a German poet and writer.

== Biography ==
Peter Hille was born into the family of a teacher. He studied at the gymnasiums of Höxter and Münster. While still at school, he joined the secret youth union Satrebil. Its members studied the works of Karl Marx, Charles Darwin, Pierre-Joseph Proudhon, August Bebel and others. In 1874, Hille was expelled from the gymnasium for poor academic performance and then served as a clerk for the prosecutor in Höxter, and later worked as a proofreader in one of the Leipzig printing houses. In 1877, Hille began collaborating with the magazine Deutsche Dichtung, in which his poems were published for the first time. For the magazine Deutsche Monatsblätter, he published articles on literary criticism. For some time Hille worked in Bremen for the socialist newspaper Bremer Tageblatt. In 1880 the writer lived in London in very modest conditions and studied the theories of socialism and anarchism there.

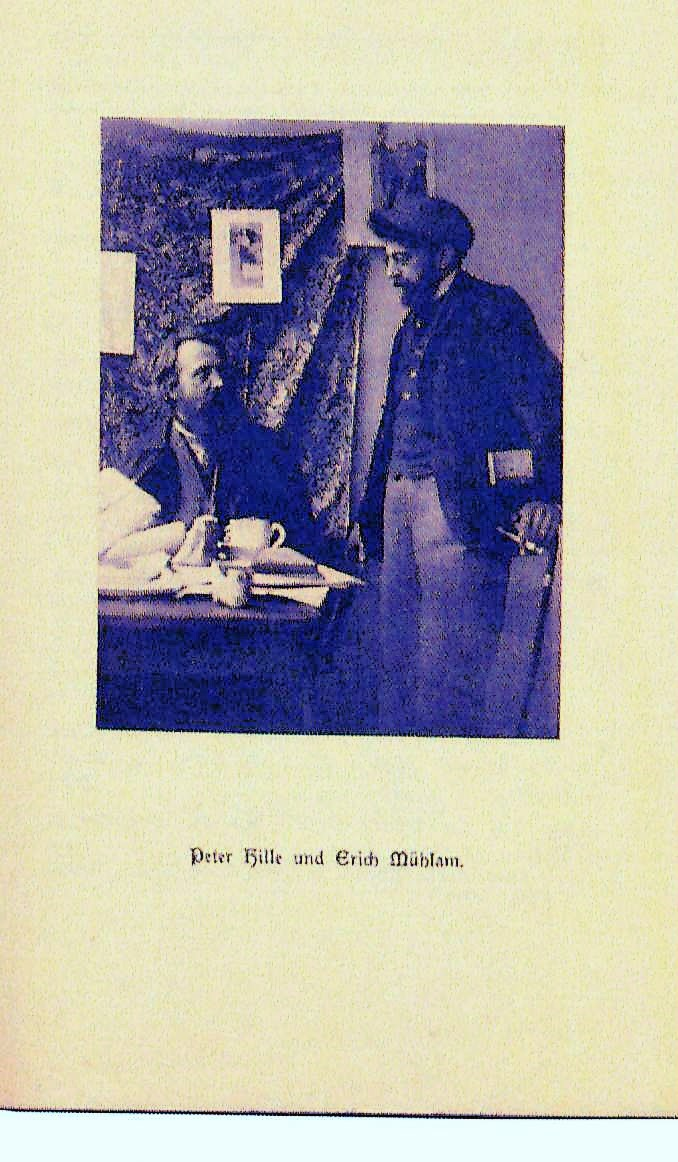
Peter Hille with his friend Erich Mühsam

Having received an inheritance, Hille financed the performances of a Dutch theatre troupe, which ruined him financially. The poet lived in squalid conditions, often homeless. In 1888, he fell ill with tuberculosis. However, he did not abandon his literary activities and played an important role in the development of the naturalistic genre in Germany. With the help of Karl Henckel, the poet went to Zurich, and from there he went to southern Europe. In 1891, he lived with his friend Julius Hart. The police pursued Hille, seeing him as a dangerous socialist activist. Hille hid from surveillance throughout Germany until he arrived in Berlin in 1895. In Berlin, Hille received support from famous German naturalist writers of the Neue Gemeinschaft, with their financial help he opened a cabaret in 1902.

Hille eventually died of tuberculosis in 1904. His body was initially buried in the Berlin suburb of Mariendorf. In 1938, his remains were reburied in an honorary grave in the Catholic St. Matthias Cemetery in Berlin-Tempelhof.

== Works ==
- Die Sozialisten. Novel. W. Friedrich, Leipzig 1886.
- Des Platonikers Sohn. Erziehungstragödie. E. F. Conrad’s Buchhandlung (O. Reuter), Berlin 1896.
- Semiramis – Cleopatra. Messer & Cie., Berlin 1902.
- Die Hassenburg – Roman aus dem Teutoburger Wald. Schuster & Loeffler, Berlin und Leipzig 1905.
- Das Mysterium Jesu. First published in installments in 1910 in Der Sturm, book edition in 1921 in Insel-Bücherei.
