= Meta Kraus-Fessel =

German anarchist and researcher (1884–1940)

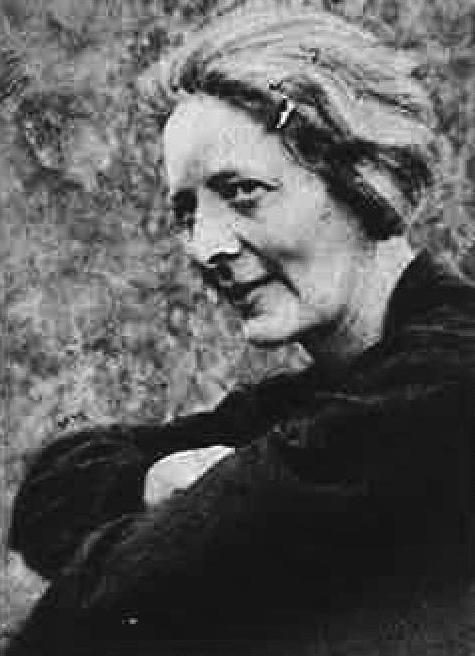
Kraus-Fessel c. 1927

Meta Kraus-Fessel (born Meta Kraus: 6 August 1884 – 23 November 1940) was a German anarchist, communist, journalist, welfare ministry official and behavioural researcher.

== Life ==
Meta Fessel was born in Przytullen a small village then in a rural part of East Prussia. (Today it is in Poland a short distance to the south of the border with the Kaliningrad enclave.) Her father was a landowner. During the war, between 1914 and 1918 she worked on the other side of the country in the city welfare office in Frankfurt am Main, as a counsellor for those bereaved and / or injured by the war. It was here that she met Siegfried Kraus from Vienna whom she married, but the two of them separated quite soon after that. By the end of the war she was recognised for her expertise in social matters, and on 1 October 1919 she was appointed as the first female official in the Prussian Welfare ministry, initially as an internal consultant and, from 1922, as a government officer. She was entrusted with leadership department for child care and morally endangered young women. However, in 1924 she entered into temporary retirement.

At the outbreak of the war Kraus-Fessel was a member of the Social Democratic Party (SPD). However, the decision by the party leadership in 1914 to implement what amounted to a parliamentary truce over the financing of the war was contentious within the SPD from the outset: the tensions only increased as front line slaughter and home front destitution mounted. One result was a series of party splits, and by 1919 Meta Kraus-Fessel was a member of the recently launched Communist Party of Germany. Within the party she became involved in the Workers International Relief operation, launched in 1921, and in 1924 she was a co-founder of the complementary International Red Aid organisation. As Stalinist hardliners, in conscious emulation of developments in Moscow, tightened their control over the Communist Party in Germany, Kraus-Fessel became disillusioned with it, and her political loyalties switched progressively from Communism to Anarchism.

She was also working during the 1920s as an assistant to the pioneering sexologist, Magnus Hirschfeld. Following the concentration camp murder of her fellow anarchist, Erich Mühsam, she took care of his widow, Zenzl. Fairly soon afterwards the two of them fell out.

The change of government in January 1933 heralded a rapid switch to one-party dictatorship. The Reichstag fire in February 1933 was instantly blamed on "communists", after which people with any sort of a political past involving the Communist Party either fled abroad or were arrested. In 1934 Meta Kraus-Fessel emigrated to Vienna. One of her achievements during the next few years included helping the anarchist, historian and linguistics scholar Max Nettlau escape from Vienna to Amsterdam by 1938. Possibly even more challenging was the rescue and transfer of his very large library and the archives collections that it contained. These were sold to the International Institute of Social History in Amsterdam.

She herself was able to escape to the United States in 1938. In 1940, after learning that she was incurably ill, she killed herself.

== See also ==
- Anarchism in Germany
