= Werner Schuder =

German publisher

Werner Schuder (25 February 1917 – 20 October 2006) was a German publisher.

== Life ==
Born in Berlin, Schuder completed an apprenticeship in book trade and librarianship. After his studies, he first worked as a librarian in the university library and became a lecturer at the library school of the State Library in Berlin. On 15 April 1954, he joined the publishing house Walter de Gruyter, where he was responsible for the fields of mathematics, economics and social sciences. Among other things, he was in charge of the Sammlung GöschenGöschen Collection and taught as a part-time lecturer at the FU Berlin and at the Berlin University of the Arts for librarianship and information science. He also worked for the publishing house as editor, publishing director and publisher until 31 May 1986. He is known, among other things, for publishing the Kürschners Deutscher Gelehrten-Kalender- and Kürschners Deutscher Literatur-Kalender. Schuder was a member of the Theodor Fontane Society and the Berlin Bibliophile Evening.

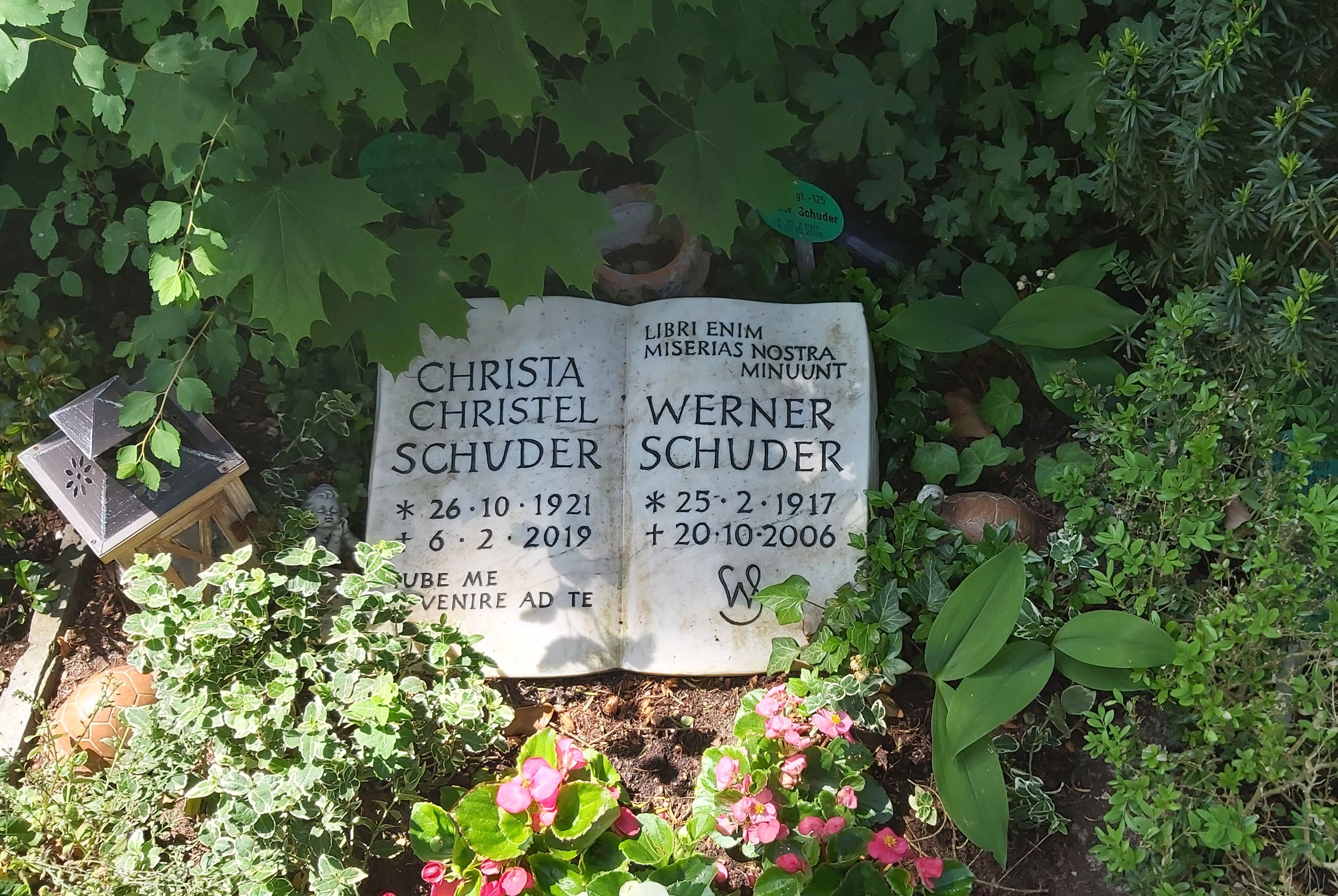
Gravestone in the Lichterfelde Park Cemetery

== Publications ==
- as publisher with Wolfgang Milde: De captu lectoris. Wirkungen des Buches im 15. und 16. Jahrhundert. Dargestellt an ausgewählten Handschriften und Drucken. Berlin 1988, ISBN 3-11-009989-6.
- with Herma Stamm: Bibliophilia activa. Publikationen, Gaben, Drucke vom und für den Berliner Bibliophilen-Abend 1905–1994. Festgabe 1995 aus Anlass seines neunzigjährigen Bestehens. Berlin 1995, ISBN 3-9801998-6-X.
- Der Ackermann aus Böhmen. Eine literatur- und buchhistorische Betrachtung. Vortrag, gehalten auf der Veranstaltung des Berliner Bibliophilen-Abends am 18. November 1996. Berlin 1997, ISBN 3-9805622-0-4.
- De Litteris et Libris. Betrachtungen und Reflexionen aus fünf Jahrzehnten. Berlin 2004, ISBN 3-00-013865-X.
