= Neue Gemeinschaft =

Art community in Berlin

The Neue Gemeinschaft (New Community) was an anarchist, artistic commune run between 1900 and 1904 by the Heinrich and Julius Hart brothers and Gustav Landauer in the Berlin district of Schlachtensee, with the participation of politically active Lebensreformers, anarchists and artists.

The Neue Gemeinschaft emerged from the Friedrichshagener Dichterkreis naturalist poets' circle, which had emerged from 1890 on the eastern outskirts of Berlin. Both political dissidents and some of the leading authors of naturalism, such as Gerhart Hauptmann, had settled there, at least temporarily. When the group increasingly quarreled and began to fall apart, the Hart brothers founded a new colony in 1902 on the other western side of the Berlin outskirts, in Schlachtensee, the free-religious and anarchist Neue Gemeinschaft . The community was based in a house with 29 rooms and several common rooms. Monthly "consecration festivals" took place with an increasingly cultist character, which often lasted until the early morning.

The Neue Gemeinschaft was inspired by the English garden city movement, which, inspired by the ideas of William Morris, wanted to emancipate people from the juggernaut of the big city and industrialization and bring them to live together in a quasi-primordial communist community.

Some of short-lived community's members included the painter Fidus, the writers Peter Hille, Bernhard Kampffmeyer, Gustav Landauer, Martin Buber, Else Lasker-Schüler, Willy Pastor and Erich Mühsam.

== See also ==
- Art colony
- Monte Verità
