= Wolf-Dieter Hütteroth =

Wolf-Dieter Hütteroth (born 28 November 1930 in Chojna, died 9 November 2010) was a German geographer and researcher.

== Biography ==
Hütteroth studied at the University of Marburg and in 1953 became a member of the Studentenverbindung "Corps Guestphalia Marburg".

He obtained his doctorate in Marburg in 1958 with a thesis supervised by Kurt Scharlau, and in 1966 was habilitated at the University of Göttingen. From 1967 he was a lecturer with civil servant status at the University of Erlangen–Nuremberg. From 1969 he was a full professor at the University of Cologne. In 1972 he returned to Erlangen as a professor. He was mainly concerned with general historical geography, regional studies of the Islamic Orient and geomorphological processes. He was a recognised expert on Turkey and the Kurds. He became professor emeritus in 1996.

In February 2009, the Marburg Department of Geography awarded him the "Golden Doctoral Certificate"

His papers (11 boxes) are kept at the Leibniz Institute for Regional Geography in Leipzig.

== Works ==
- Bergnomaden und Yaylabauern im mittleren kurdischen Taurus (= Marburger geographische Schriften. H. 11). Geographisches Institut der Universität Marburg, Marburg 1959 (Dissertation, Universität Marburg, 1958).
- Ländliche Siedlungen im südlichen Inneranatolien in den letzten vierhundert Jahren (= Göttinger geographische Abhandlungen. Bd. 46). Geographisches Institut der Universität Göttingen, Göttingen 1968 (Habilitationsschrift, Universität Göttingen, 1965).
- Hütteroth, Wolf-Dieter; Abdulfattah, K. (1977). Historical Geography of Palestine, Transjordan and Southern Syria in the Late 16th Century. Erlanger Geographische Arbeiten, Sonderband 5. Erlangen, Germany: Vorstand der Fränkischen Geographischen Gesellschaft. ISBN 3-920405-41-2.
- Palästina und Transjordanien im 16. Jahrhundert: Wirtschaftsstruktur ländlicher Siedlungen nach osmanischen Steuerregistern (= Beihefte zum Tübinger Atlas des Vorderen Orients. Reihe B: Geisteswissenschaften. Nr. 33). Reichert, Wiesbaden 1978.
- Türkei. Wissenschaftliche Buchgesellschaft, Darmstadt 1982; 2., vollständig neubearbeitete Auflage (with Volker Höhfeld) 2002, ISBN 978-3-534-13712-1.
- with Nejat Göyünç: Land an der Grenze: Osmanische Verwaltung im heutigen türkisch-syrisch-irakischen Grenzgebiet im 16. Jahrhundert. Eren, Istanbul 1997.

== Literature ==
- Kürschners Deutscher Gelehrten-Kalender, 22. Ausgabe (2009). Bd. 2, S. 1770.
- Hans Becker(de): Länderkundler der Türkei und Historischer Geograph des Osmanischen Reiches: Wolf-Dieter Hütteroth (1930–2010). Mitt. d. Fränk. Geograph. Ges., 58 (2011), S. 363–378 (Online: pdf).
