= Kürschners Handbücher =

German reference work

The Kürschners Handbücher, originally published by Joseph Kürschner (1853–1902), is a series of biographical reference works. Many entries are based on self information. Since the takeover by the Saur-Verlag publishing House in Munich, a self-suggestion is also possible. The series originated from Kürschners Deutscher Literatur-Kalender, which first appeared in 1879.

The book presents 3 categories

== Literature and Science ==
- Kürschners Deutscher Literatur-Kalender. 2 partial volumes. Publisher de Gruyter, Berlin (71st volume) 2018/19, ISBN 978-3-11-057616-0. With biographical data, address, memberships and literary awards of 13,436 living authors of German-language literature on the fine arts, as well as about 178,000 publications.
- Kürschners Deutscher Literatur-Kalender. 4 partial volumes. Verlag de Gruyter, Berlin (23rd edition) 2011, ISBN 978-3-598-23630-3, ISSN 1616-8399 (since 2001). With biographical data, address, main research areas and fields of work of 77,425 scientists and scholars as well as their most important publications.
- Kürschners Deutscher Sachbuch-Kalender. (2nd edition 2003/2004) 2004, ISBN 3-598-24181-X.

== Visual arts, music and theatre ==
- Kürschners Deutscher Gelehrten-Kalender. 2 partial volumes. Publisher de Gruyter, Berlin (71st volume) 2018/19, ISBN 978-3-11-057616-0. With biographical Kürschners Graphiker-Handbuch Deutschland, Österreich, Schweiz. Illustrators, commercial artists, typographers, edited by Charlotte Fergg-Frowein, 2nd, extended edition, Berlin: de Gruyter, 1967
- Kürschners Handbuch der Bildenden Künstler. 2 partial volumes. Saur Verlag, Munich (2nd volume) 2007, ISBN 978-3-598-24737-8 with biographical data, address, teaching activities, exhibiting galleries among others of 6,700 living visual artists: painting, graphic arts, sculpture, book art, action and media arts and (in selection) architecture, photography and arts and crafts).
- Furrier's Musician's Handbook. 2 partial volumes. K. G. Saur Verlag, Munich (5th volume) 2007, ISBN 978-3-598-24212-0. (Over 12,000 soloists, conductors, composers, university teachers).
- Kürschners biographisches Theater-Handbuch: Drama, opera, film, radio. Germany, Austria, Switzerland. de Gruyter, Berlin 1956 (series thus discontinued).

== Politics ==
- Kürschners Volkshandbuch (Abgeordnetenhandbuch) with short biographies of all members of the German Bundestag or State parliaments.
- "Kürschners Handbuch Europäisches Parlament" with biographies of all German members of the European Parliament and short biographies of the other members from the other member countries.
- '"Abgeordnetenhaus Berlin, Taschenbuch 18. Wahlperiode'", Redaction: Kürschners Poilitkontakte, NDV GmbH & Co KG, Bad Honnef 2017, ISBN 978-3-95879-048-3.
