= Zenzl Mühsam =

Bavarian socialist

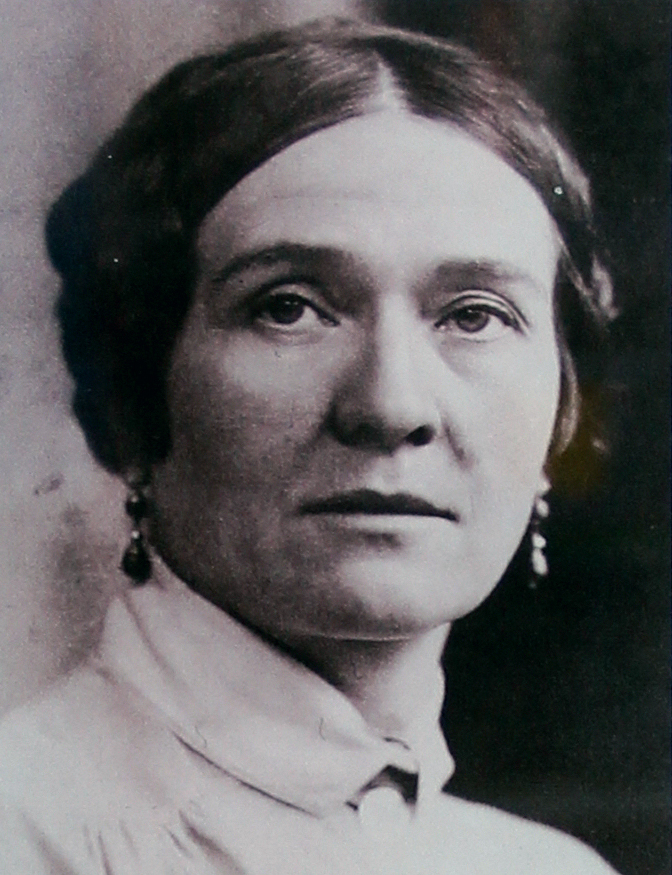
- Portrait of Mühsam from a plaque in Pankow
- Born: Kreszentia Elfinger; July 27, 1884; Upper Bavaria, Kingdom of Bavaria, German Empire
- Died: March 10, 1962 (aged 77); East Berlin, German Democratic Republic
- Resting place: Zentralfriedhof Friedrichsfelde
- Spouse: Erich Mühsam
- Awards: Patriotic Order of Merit, in silver (1959)

Zenzl Mühsam (born Kreszentia Elfinger; 27 July 1884 – 10 March 1962) was a political activist who was involved, with her husband, Erich Mühsam, in the Munich Soviet ("workers' council") of 1919.

Fifteen years later, after her husband had been murdered in the Oranienburg concentration camp near Berlin, she made her way to Moscow, hoping to arrange for the publication of her husband's political writings. Eight months after her arrival, identified as a "Trotskyist spy" she was caught up in the political purges of the late 1930s and first arrested in April 1936. She was unable to leave the Soviet Union for another eighteen years, spending much (though not all) of that time in prisons or labour camps. She survived.

== Life ==
=== Provenance and early years ===
Kreszentia Elfinger was born in the Hallertau countryside region of Bavaria, to the north of Munich. She was the fifth recorded child of the guesthouse keeper and hop farmer Augustin Elfinger. Her first job was as a domestic servant, working at the home of a local butcher: she was dismissed after a few months. Moving to Munich she came across political exiles from Russia, following the failed 1905 revolution and organised welfare support. She was much affected by the tales told by exiled Russian students of fellow revolutionaries killed or exiled in Siberia. During this time she met and then moved in to live with the 24 year old artist and sculptor Ludwig Engler, employed as a domestic servant or, according to some bourgeois neighbourly gossip, illegally as a concubine.

On 15 September 1915 she married the anarcho-pacifist writer Erich Mühsam. In 1917 her fifteen-year-old son Siegfried (born 16 October 1902), who up to this point had grown up with relatives, moved in with the couple. Siegfried's own paternity has never been made public: the marriage with Mühsam would remain childless. The marriage was nevertheless a close and mutually supportive one.

=== Weimar years ===
The end of the First World War was followed by months of revolutionary turmoil in many parts of Germany. In Munich a Soviet republic was declared in April 1919, led by Ernst Toller and other prominent left wingers and anarchists including Erich Mühsam. Zenzl Mühsam was his most fervent fellow activist before, during and after what turned out to be a six day period in power. They were both arrested and imprisoned, but Zenzl was released whereas Erich was sentenced to fifteen years "confined in a fortress" where, it seems, he had a little more freedom than in a conventional prison: he wrote numerous poems and, in 1920, published "Judas", his first play. Zenzl turned to campaigning on behalf of all the political prisoners detained following the short-lived Bavarian Soviet Republic uprising. One objective - widely shared, as matters turned out - was a more general amnesty, which the new democratic German government granted in 1923/24.

During the early 1920s she was organising sewing meetings in support of "Russia Aid" ("Russland-Hilfe"), and she took part in the first congress of Red Aid ("Rote Hilfe"), a left-wing welfare organisation closely linked to the recently founded Communist Party. and to the Comintern in Moscow. It was here that she got to know Elena Stasova, a Russian communist whom one source identifies as "Lenin's former secretary". On 28 April 1923, while her husband was still in prison, Zenzl Mühsam wrote a personal letter to Lenin asking that he arrange for Erich Mühsam to be transferred to Moscow. She even wrote to the papal nuncio, hoping to invoke papal intervention with the authorities. Nothing came directly out of her requests, but at the end of 1924 Erich Mühsam was released from prison, according to one source let out "early" by the Bavarian authorities because he was suffering from heart problems. The couple now relocated from Munich to Berlin.

During the later 1920s and early 1930s the Mühsams lived and worked in Berlin with various politically like-minded comrades. They moved several times. At one stage they were living with the Communists Fritz Weigel and Willi Münzenberg in Berlin-Charlottenburg. Later they were greeted by Wilhelm Pieck's Red Aid team near Berlin's Anhalter Station. In 1927 they moved again, apparently to a home of their own in the [[Hufeisensiedlung|Hufeisensiedlung (social housing estate)]] on the south side of the city centre.

=== Nazi years and exile ===
Régime change in January 1933 marked a savage change in political direction as the Hitler government lost little time in transforming Germany into a one-party dictatorship. At the end of February 1933 the Reichstag fire was instantly blamed on "communists" and triggered a wave of arrests. Erich Mühsam had long enjoyed a frosty relationship with the Communist Party, but as a left-wing anarchist writer he was evidently high on the Nazi target list, and he was among the first to be arrested. Fifteen months later, on 10 July 1934, he died under torture at the Oranienburg concentration camp. Newly widowed, Zenzl Mühsam turned to friends and comrades for support, notably Meta Kraus-Fessel (although the two quickly fell out).

Keen to preserve both her husband's legacy and her own liberty, she transferred Erich Mühsam's copious collection of papers to a comrade called Ernst Simmerling who was in turn able to pass them to the relatively safe care of his brother in law, Rudolf Rocker, an anarcho-syndicalist who around this time successfully fled to the United States. Zenzl Mühsam herself relocated from Berlin to Dresden, relatively close to the German border with Czechoslovakia. Czechoslovakia at this stage was still an independent country, and its capital, Prague, was the destination of choice for a large number of political refugees keen to avoid imprisonment or worse in the new Germany.

Her demands for a public investigation into her husband's death did not endear Zenzl Mühsam to the Nazi authorities, and when she was warned by the American journalist, Dorothy Thompson, that she was about to be arrested by the Gestapo, on 15 July 1934 she crossed the border into Czechoslovakia. She was accompanied by her nephew, Joseph Elfinger, whose father had recently been sent to the Dachau concentration camp. In September 1934, with the help of a book dealer called Fritz Picard and Camill Hofmann, the Czechoslovak press attaché, she managed to smuggle her dead husband's papers into Prague as "diplomatic baggage". By this time she had already been able to report on the German Concentration Camps in front of international journalists, though it is not clear whether this attracted much notice. Erich Mühsam's will had also been published, appointing Rudolf Rocker as joint literary executor in collaboration with Zenzl. In January 1935 she published "The Ordeal of Erich Mühsam". Back in Germany the government responded by removing her German citizenship.

One place where Erich Mühsam's murder had not gone unnoticed was Moscow. After rejecting several invitations to move to the Soviet Union, and despite comradely warnings about the dangers, she moved with her nephew to Moscow, arriving on 8 August 1935. One reason for her change of heart was the hope that in Moscow her nephew, Joseph Elfinger, would be able to find work. Her move to the Soviet Union had been anticipated by the publication by International Red Aid in Moscow of a "brochure" detailing the suffering of Erich Mühsam and the subsequent deprivation of German citizenship for his widow. On her arrival she was able to give lectures on the atrocities in Germany to large audiences of workers. In November 1935 she participated in an "Erich Mühsam memorial event".

In February 1936 Erich Mühsam's papers arrived in Moscow and were handed over to the Soviet authorities. Zenzl decided to remain in Moscow for another year to oversee their transfer to the Maxim Gorky Literature Institute. On 8 April or 23 April 1936 she was arrested, however, accused of "counter-revolutionary Trotskyite activities", and taken into Moscow's Lubyanka jail. In June 1936 the philosopher-scholar André Gide, visiting Moscow, enquired about the whereabouts of Zenzl Mühsam but was given incorrect answers. In July 1936 Ruth Oesterreich, a communist activist from Berlin exiled, at this point, in Prague, urged to Erich Mühsam's siblings in Palestine to launch an international campaign for Zenzl Mühsam's release. In the meantime, Mühsam had been moved from the Lubyanka jail to the Butyrka prison, also in Moscow. However, the authorities were evidently not indifferent to international campaigns, and in October 1936 she was released, subject to the condition imposed by the NKVD law enforcement agency that she should not remain in Moscow. Also during 1936 her nephew Joseph Elfinger was arrested: nothing more was heard of him.

There was another round of political show trials in January 1937 including that of Karl Radek, which was attended by Franz Feuchtwanger. During his stay in Moscow Zenzl Mühsam was able to visit him in his hotel. Later that year, in June, she concluded a deal with the Gorky Institute whereby she sold Erich Mühsam's literary legacy in return for a monthly maintenance payment of 500 roubles. She retained certain authorship rights. In order to be able to publish Erich Mühsam's "Unpolitischen Erinnerungen" ("Unpolitical Memories") and his "Jolly Gedichte" ("... poems") Zenzl set about researching in various institutes and libraries. In the summer of 1938, she applied for an exit visa in order to visit the United States of America. Sources speculate that refusal of the application was intended to prevent her reporting the Stalin Show Trials and Soviet prison conditions in the west.

=== War years ===
She was rearrested, probably in November 1938. However, it was only on 11 September 1939 that she was convicted of "belonging to a counter-revolutionary organisation, and for counter-revolutionary agitation". She was sentenced to eight years in a labour camp. Still in September she was taken to Labour Camp XV at Potma in Mordovia. However, she was returned to Moscow three months later, and returned to the Butyrka prison where she joined other German political detainees retrieved from the Gulag in order to be returned to the Gestapo in Germany. These included Carola Neher and Margarete Buber-Neumann. (A couple of months before, Hitler and Stalin had triggered widespread amazement when they had signed a non-aggression pact on behalf of their respective governments.)

For whatever reason the German detainees gathered together in Moscow were never handed over to the Gestapo. In October 1940 she was taken to Labour Camp III at Yavas, back in Mordovia. War ended in May 1945 and in November 1946 she was released from the labour camp and deported to Kolchanova (near Novosibirsk), where she was required to remain "in perpetuity". In March 1947 she recognised a railway worker, with whose help she was smuggled back to Moscow where for a time she lived at the (by this time much degraded) Hotel Lux, integrating herself with German exiles awaiting repatriation. However, she was denounced to the authorities - according to one source by fellow German exile Roberta Gropper - and forbidden to remain in Moscow. During 1947/48 she reapplied for permission to return to "Germany" - in this case the large region surrounding Berlin which since May 1945 had been administered as the Soviet occupation zone. This was blocked, however reportedly by the Socialist Unity Party of Germany ("Sozialistische Einheitspartei Deutschlands" / SED), a new political party created in the occupation zone in April 1946 under controversial circumstances that had involved the "merger" into the new party of what had hitherto been the Communist Party of Germany. She moved out of Moscow to nearby (by Russian standards) Ivanovo where she found work in an orphanage.

In Ivanovo she was rearrested in October 1949 and deported to the Omsk region where she was set to work on a collective farm and lived with the Götting family, surviving members of the Volga German community. Meanwhile Rudolf Rocker, who by this time had lived in the United States for many years, launched an international campaign for her release:

"Why Zenzl Mühsam has been kept in Russian captivity for thirteen years – a time that not even eternity can give back to her – remains incomprehensible. It is possible that she was only used as a propaganda tool from the beginning; as a mere means of taking possession of Erich Mühsam's papers. It is also possible that she got to know too much about the inner workings of the NKVD and that the government considered it dangerous to let her return to Prague. Shortly after her arrival in Moscow, the era of terror began. If this was the case, then she was neutralized to protect the interests of the state - a purpose for which no means are despicable enough. A human life counts for nothing in a totalitarian police state like Russia."

In the end she was allowed to return to her work at the orphanage in Ivanovo only after the death, early in 1953, of Joseph Stalin.

=== The path to rehabilitation and celebration ===
The Soviet occupation zone was superseded in October 1949 by the Soviet sponsored German Democratic Republic. Her German nationality was reinstated and her German passport returned, albeit only after a succession of "bureaucratic delays", in March 1955. On 27 June 1955 Zenzl Mühsam arrived in (East) Berlin, back on German soil for the first time in nearly twenty years. In East Berlin, now the capital of a new kind of German state, she was given an honorary pension in respect of her husband as well as a pension on her own account. In 1959 her 75th birthday was celebrated with the award of the Patriotic Order of Merit in silver.

In July 1956 a solemn ceremony took place in which 94,000 micro-filmed pages of the Erich Mühsam literary archive were handed over from the Maxim Gorky Institute to the (East) Berlin Arts Academy. Zenzl now launched a campaign to have her husband's output posthumously published in East Germany. In 1958 at the East Berlin "Club of the Creatives" ("Klub der Kulturschaffenden") an event was organised to celebrate, had he lived for longer, what would have been Erich Mühsam's eightieth birthday. Meanwhile the publishers "Volk und Welt" published a (savagely shortened) selection from his poetry.

Back in Moscow, in July 1959 a military tribunal in the Moscow military quarter lifted the earlier sentence against her, which it attributed to an error in the criminal procedure. There followed a rehabilitation covering the sentences of 1936/38. Rehabilitation in respect of her 1949 sentence followed only after her death, however. Zenzl Mühsam died of Lung cancer on 10 March 1962.

=== The body ===
Her ashes were placed buried in the Socialists' Memorial Zone, where the East German government placed the bodies of its heroes, in the Friedrichsfelde Main Cemetery. Erich Mühsam's body had ended up in what became, after 1945, West Berlin. It was only in 1992, following German reunification, that her ashes were removed without ceremony or any public announcement to the grave of her husband, in the context of a "rationalisation" of the city's cemetery administration, and because the Berlin Senate determined that "only the division of the city had, till then, prevented a shared grave location" for the two of them.
