= Alemannic Wikipedia =

Alemannic-language edition of Wikipedia

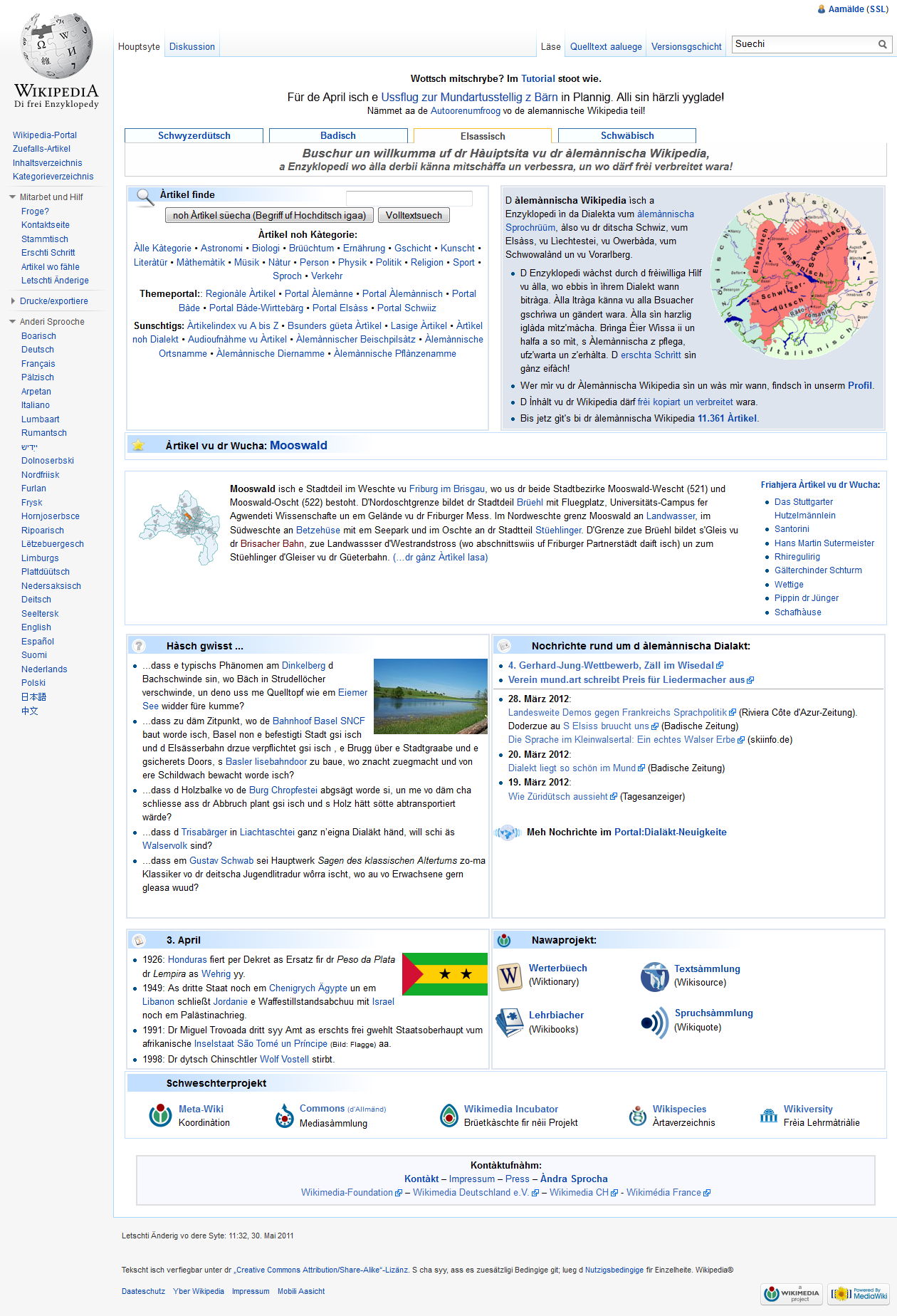
- Website type: Internet encyclopedia project
- Available in: Alemannic
- Owner: Wikimedia Foundation
- Website: als.wikipedia.org
- Commercial: No
- Registration: Optional
- Content license: Creative Commons Attribution/ Share-Alike 4.0 (most text also dual-licensed under GFDL); Media licensing varies

The Alemannic Wikipedia (Alemannic: Alemannischi Wikipedia) is the Alemannic language edition of the Web-based free-content encyclopedia Wikipedia. The project was started on 13 November 2003, as an Alsatian language edition. A year later it was expanded to encompass all Alemannic dialects because of low activity in the first year. Since 2004 all Alemannic dialects are accepted on als:wp.

As of 27 September 2026, it has 31,807 articles and is the 117th-largest Wikipedia. Contributors and users include people from Germany, Switzerland, Austria, France, Liechtenstein, and even a few Walser people from Italy.

== Language ==
=== Articles and article titles ===
A peculiarity of the Alemannic Wikipedia is the wide range of dialects permitted; all varieties of Alemannic, including Swiss German, Swabian, Alsatian, and all others are accepted. Authors may not normally alter the dialect used by another contributor, though exceptions are made for local topics, in which modifying the text to reflect the local variety is encouraged. Articles may thus be written in a mix of different varieties. Since there is no standardized orthography for Alemannic, spelling rules are quite relaxed. However, contributors are encouraged to adhere to spelling conventions found in the Alemannic-language literature, and introducing new symbols is not tolerated.

Article titles are in Standard German, but display is frequently manipulated to show Alemannic text.

=== Language codes ===
The code "als" was used because in 2003 there had been no language code for Alsatian. ISO 639-3 gives four codes for several Alemannic dialects:

- gct is the code for Alemán Coloniero
- gsw is the code for Swiss German, also for Alsatian
- swg is the code for Swabian German
- wae is the code for Walser German

As all of these four dialects are accepted on the Alemannic Wikipedia, it was decided not to move the Alemannic Wikipedia to gsw.wikipedia.org, even though the code als stands for Tosk Albanian in ISO 639-3. To solve this problem a request for a superior code for all Alemannic dialects has been submitted to SIL International by Alemannic Wikipedians.

Despite the existence of dedicated ISO 639-3 codes and the possibility of more specific marking with country code subtags, all pages use 'gsw' in the HTML language tag.

=== List of dialects that are used on single-dialect pages ===
Below is a list of dialects that have a category in als:Kategorie:Wikipedia:Dialekt and where that category contains at least one article.

List of dialects used for a full article in the Alemannic Wikipedia
BCP 47	Name (autonym)	Name (English)	Country	Part of
swg	Schwäbisch	Swabian	DE	Schwäbisch
wae	Wallisertiitsch	Walser German	CH, AT	Höchstalemannisch
wae-AT	Vorarlbärgischs Walsertüütsch		AT	Höchstalemannisch
gsw	Oberrhiinalemannisch		DE, FR?	Niederalemannisch
gsw	Bodeseealemannisch		DE, CH	Mittelalemannisch
gsw-AT	Vorarlbärgisch		AT	(several, group of dialects)
gsw-LI	Liachtastänerisch		LI	(several, group of dialects)
gsw-FR	Elsässisch	Alsatian German	FR	Niederalemannisch > Oberrheinalemannisch
gsw-DE	Markgräflerisch		DE	Hochalemannisch
gsw-CH	Aargauerdüütsch	Aargau German	CH	Hochalemannisch
gsw-CH	Baselbieterdütsch		CH	Hochalemannisch
gsw-CH	Baseldytsch	Basel German	CH	Niederalemannisch > Oberrheinalemannisch
gsw-CH	Bärndütsch	Bernese German	CH	Hochalemannisch
gsw-CH	Freiämtertütsch		CH	Hochalemannisch
gsw-CH	Glarnertüütsch		CH	Höchstalemannisch
gsw-CH	Ostschwizertütsch		CH	Hochalemannisch
gsw-CH	Schwyzerdütsch		CH	Höchstalemannisch
gsw-CH	Soledurnerdütsch		CH	Hochalemannisch
gsw-CH	St. Gallerdütsch		CH	Hochalemannisch
gsw-CH	Seislertütsch		CH	Höchstalemannisch
gsw-CH	Züritüütsch	Zürich German	CH	Hochalemannisch

=== Other Wikipedias in German dialect ===
Alemannic Wikipedia was the first Wikipedia in a German dialect, followed by the Bavarian Wikipedia and the Ripuarian Wikipedia.

=== Alemannic in other Wikimedia projects ===
Other Wikimedia projects in Alemannic have also been created, such as an Alemannic Wiktionary, an Alemannic Wikiquote, and an Alemannic Wikibooks. As activity in these projects was low even after years, the community of the Alemannic Wikipedia decided to merge all Alemannic projects and import all contents of the other projects into the Alemannic Wikipedia. Since April 2008 these projects are separate namespaces within the Alemannic Wikipedia. Also an Alemannic Wikisource and an Alemannic Wikinews have been created as separate namespaces within als:wp.

Wikidata supports one language with code 'gsw' and name 'Swiss German'. A proposal to remove it has not been adopted.

== Milestones ==
Milestone	Date	Article
1 article	2003-12-27	Chemie
1,000 articles	2005-10-13	Le Landeron (Zunftwesen)
2,000 articles	2006-06-07	Geschichte des Elsass
3,000 articles	2007-05-01	Arlesheim
4,000 articles	2008-07-12	Erklärung der Menschen- und Bürgerrechte
5,000 articles	2009-05-08	Hunspach
6,000 articles	2010-02-21	Amt Meienberg
7,000 articles	2010-12-14	Batterf
8,000 articles	2011-02-22	Buttwil
9,000 articles	2011-05-16	Boron
10,000 articles	2011-06-22	Josef Villiger
11,000 articles	2012-02-21	Summerlied
12,000 articles	2012-08-21	Quiberon
13,000 articles	2012-12-13	Saint-Aubin-Sauges
14,000 articles	2013-04-03	Riemschneider
15,000 articles	2013-08-06	Baritonhorn
16,000 articles	2014-02-04	Tenorhorn
17,000 articles	2014-06-08	Basilius Amerbach der Ältere
18,000 articles	2015-01-17	Siegfried Lehmann
19,000 articles	2015-05-28	Lauingen (Donau)
20,000 articles	2015-10-12	Gion Deplazes
21,000 articles	2016-03-15	Fotze
22,000 articles	2016-11-02	Bezirk Weinfelden
23,000 articles	2017-06-19	Biermösl Blosn
24,000 articles	2018-02-15	Schweizer Singbuch
25,000 articles	2018-09-12	Schwyzer Meie
26,000 articles	2019-07-12	Internationales Dialektinstitut
27,000 articles	2020-02-25	Röllelibutzen

== See also ==
- Alemannic Wikibooks
- Alemannic Wikinews
- Alemannic Wikiquote
- Alemannic Wikisource
- Alemannic Wikivoyage
- Alemannic Wiktionary

== Sources and external links ==
- (Alemannic) Alemannic Wikipedia
- (Alemannic) Alemannic Wikipedia mobile version (not fully supported)
- Statistics for Alemannic Wikipedia by Erik Zachte
- https://meta.wikimedia.org/wiki/Alemannic_Wikipedia
- Fischer, Katja (20 May 2009). "Di freji Enzyklopädie". Tagblatt (in German). Switzerland.
- "Wikipedia feiert den 5000. Artikel des alemannischen Sprachprojekts". Liechtensteiner Volksblatt (in German). Liechtenstein. 18 May 2009. Archived from the original on 13 July 2019.
- Müller, Felix (16 May 2009). "Im weltweiten Netz spricht man auch Alemannisch". Stuttgarter Zeitung (in German). Germany. Archived from the original on 20 May 2009. "16. Mai 2009"
- Tolsdorf, Maja (25 February 2009). "Arbeit an der freien Enzyklopädie". www.badische-zeitung.de (in German). Germany: Badische Zeitung.
- Knobloch, Louisa (15 September 2008). "Dialekt im Internet – die Alemannische Wikipedia". www.badische-zeitung.de (in German). Germany: Badische Zeitung.
- Schutzbach, Nikolaj E. A. (23 January 2008). "Kurios! So liest sich Wikipedia auf Alemannisch". Südkurier (in German). Germany: SÜDKURIER Online. Archived from the original on 16 July 2011.
- Keller, Christian (2007). "Wiki und die schlauen Helfer". der arbeitsmarkt (in German). No. 9. Switzerland. Archived from the original on 6 July 2011.
- "D'alemannisch Wikipedia". Südkurier (in German). Germany. 24 January 2007. Archived from the original on 16 July 2011.
- "Que voulez-vous savoir sur "Wikipedia uff Alemannisch"?". Land Un Sproch (in French). 63. France. Summer 2007.
- Grzega, Joachim (2009). "Zur Stärkung des Status von Sprachen durch Wikipedia" (PDF). Journal for EuroLinguistiX (in German). 6. www1.ku-eichstaett.de: 1–12.
