= Charlotte Landau =

German women's rights activist

- שרלוטה לנדאו-מיזאם
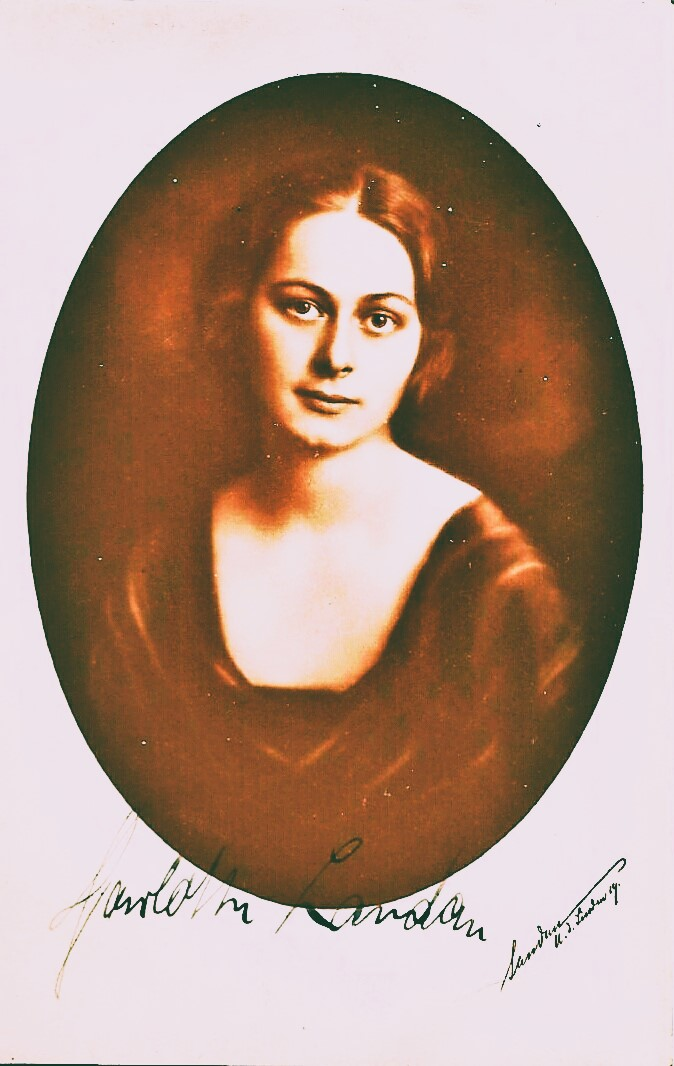
- Born: September 20, 1881
- Died: 1972
- Citizenship: Israel
- Education: Ernestinenschule
- Political party: German Democratic Party
- Movement: League of Jewish Women (Germany)

Charlotte Landau (Hebrew: שרלוטה לנדאו-מיזאם; September 20, 1881 - 1972) was a German women's rights activist and a member of the Lübeck city council prior to her emigration to Haifa in 1933.

== Biography ==
Charlotte was the daughter of Siegfried Mühsam, a pharmacist and member of the Lübeck city council. She had two brothers, Hans and Erich Mühsam.

In 1903, she met lawyer Leo Landau, whom she married in December 1908. They had three children: Gustav (1909–2004), a civil engineer; Hans Theodor (1912–2005), a classical philologist and archaeologist; and Eva (1914–2009), a teacher who married Joel.

Shortly after its establishment, Landau joined the German Democratic Party and served as a member of the Lübeck city council from 1919 to 1921. She was one of the first female representatives and the only Jewish member of the council during that election period. She remained a member of the health department committee until 1933.

As an active member of the League of Jewish Women in Germany (Jüdischer Frauenbund, JFB), she was instrumental in establishing one of the association's homes in Wyk auf Föhr.

Following March 1933 German federal election, Charlotte's family found the political situation increasingly intolerable. Charlotte began preparations for her emigration, including paying the Reich Flight Tax. From April 4 to 17, 1933, Charlotte, her husband, their children Hans and Eva, and Leo Landau's mother traveled to Haifa. They were active Zionists.

Landau wrote 1 book named "Meine Erinnerungen".
