= Kürschners Deutscher Literatur-Kalender =

The Kürschners Deutscher Literatur-Kalender is a reference work that currently contains around 12,000 bio-bibliographic articles and addresses of writers of German literature, as well as translators, publishers, agencies, radio stations, writers' associations, academies, literary magazines and feuilletons, literary prizes and awards in the German-speaking countries. Currently it is published every other year in two volumes by the publisher Walter de Gruyter. The reference work is named after the specialist in German studies Joseph Kürschner.

== History ==
For more than 130 years Kürschners Deutscher Literatur-Kalender has documented the contemporary literary scene. The compendium, constituted in 1879 by Heinrich and Julius Hart, was resumed in 1883 by Joseph Kürschner, who, with strategic and economic foresight, expanded it by introducing a questionnaire for authors, expanded the content from a list of 1260 writers to around 16,000 entries (in the 10th year) and made it a popular and comprehensive reference work. Without any critical judgement, the literary calendar presents living authors of German language fiction – regardless of their citizenship and where they live and work. After Kürschner's death in 1902 the calendar was continued by numerous editors, among them in the beginning Hermann Hillger, Heinrich Klenz, Gerhard Lüdtke, Erich Neuner or Hans Strodel, in the spirit of its origins. Initially it registered authors of "aesthetic“ works as well as "educated“, academically active writers. Due to the abundance of material, Kürschners Deutscher Gelehrten-Kalender was published as a separate work from 1925 and soon outreached the extent of its older counterpart. During the National Socialist regime the editor had to bow to the requirement of publishing only entries about members of the Reichsschrifttumkammer (Reich literature chamber). However, in 1936 he managed to publish the Necrology 1901-1935 listing the authors that had died since 1900 and their works; thus also he could be accused of publishing "unwanted writings“.

In 1949 the work was again published according to the original editorial principles. The editor Werner Schuder was responsible for the years from 1958 up to the 1980s. After not being published for a while, its publisher changed in 1998: librarian and copy editor Andreas Klimt accepted the challenge of updating and continuing the reference work for the publishing house K. G. Saur Verlag in Leipzig with the 61st edition. The publishing house Walter de Gruyter took over K. G. Saur Verlag, so Kürschners Deutscher Literatur-Kalender is published again by its original publisher since the 67th edition of 2010/2011. The 71st edition of Kürschners Deutscher Literatur-Kalender contains, in addition to entries on ca. 12,000 writers, over 800 literary translators, over 1000 publishers, over 500 literary awards with awardees, more than 600 professional unions and literary associations, houses of literature, about 300 literary magazines and periodicals as well as literary agencies, cultural departments of radio and television channels and literary feuilletons. Articles on the individual authors in alphabetical order provide information about addresses, biographical data, memberships in professional unions and literary associations, literary awards and about the writers‘ publications. The latest version of the work in two volumes was published in September 2018.

== Reception ==
"When the specialist in German studies, magazine editor and theatre critic Joseph Kürschner, a very ambitious personality, took over the Literaturkalender from its founders Heinrich and Julius Hart in its fifth year in 1883, it was a slim duodecimo book without any economical success. Kürschner introduced the distribution of questionnaires for authors and made the calendar a register, being listed in which became very popular. The number of 1260 names in the fourth year had gone up to 16,000 in the tenth. The venture prospered, and after Kürschner’s death successors were easily found who continued it in the spirit of its beginnings. That means: banning literary criticism, extreme value freedom, documentation of the facts of literary life.“ – Joachim Güntner - Neue Zürcher Zeitung: "A monument made of facts – Kürschners Deutscher Literatur-Kalender has always been striving for completeness."

"Once Roda Roda was challenged by friends: he might be able to achieve many things, but not one in particular. Never ever would he be first in Kürschner. The year ended, the new Kürschner was published, and it started with: Aaba, see Roda Roda. (In which the considerate double A is especially nice: so really nothing bad can happen.) Today Aaba Aaba is still the first name in Kürschners Literaturkalender." – Kurt Tucholsky: "The new Kürschner“.

== Current edition ==
- Kürschners Deutscher Literatur-Kalender 2020/2021. 72. Jahrgang in 2 Teilen. Walter de Gruyter, Berlin 2020, ISBN 978-3-11-067976-2 (Print).
