= Andreas Kemper =

German sociologist and author

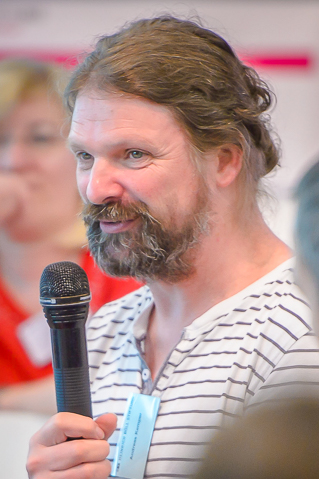
- Andreas Kemper in 2016
- Born: 11 April 1963 (age 62); Nordhorn, West Germany
- Occupation(s): Author and sociologist

Andreas Kemper (born April 11, 1963) is a German sociologist and author. He is an author about Classism and an analyst on anti-democratic tendencies in Germany, including those of the AfD.

== Life ==
He was born into a working-class family and started to study philosophy, sociology and pedagogy first at the University of Münster, then the Free University of Berlin and completed his Master's degree at the University of Münster. His research interest is classism and he has published the first introduction to Classism in Germany.

Kemper conducted critical analyzes of classism and neoliberalism (klasseismus.de), racial biology and organized anti-feminism (diskursatlas.de). He sees these developments as the basis for the emergence of the "Alternative for Germany" and published the book “Right Euro-Rebellion” in July 2013 in which he identifies the AfD as a reservoir for these currents. His book was by far the first critical book publication on the AfD. Kemper not only warned against the emergence of a right-wing party, but was also the first to accurately determine the start-up financing from the Finck Group.

He is active in the pro-feminist men's movement. Kemper is one of the contributing editors of Agent*In.

His Wikipedia nickname is Schwarze Feder. Under his pseudonym "Doris Neujahr", Torsten Hinz criticized Kemper in 2009 for his open participation in the German-language Wikipedia in an article in the journal "Junge Freiheit".

== Main interests ==
- Alternative for Germany
- Antifeminist men's rights movement
- Classism
- Educational disadvantage

== Selected works ==
- Klassismus (2009, with Heike Weinbach)
- (R)echte Kerle (2011)
- Die Maskulisten (2012 ed.)
- Rechte Euro-Rebellion (2013)
- Sarrazins Correctness (2014)
- Privatstädte: Labore für einen neuen Manchesterkapitalismus (2022)
