= Klexikon =

German-language online encyclopedia for children

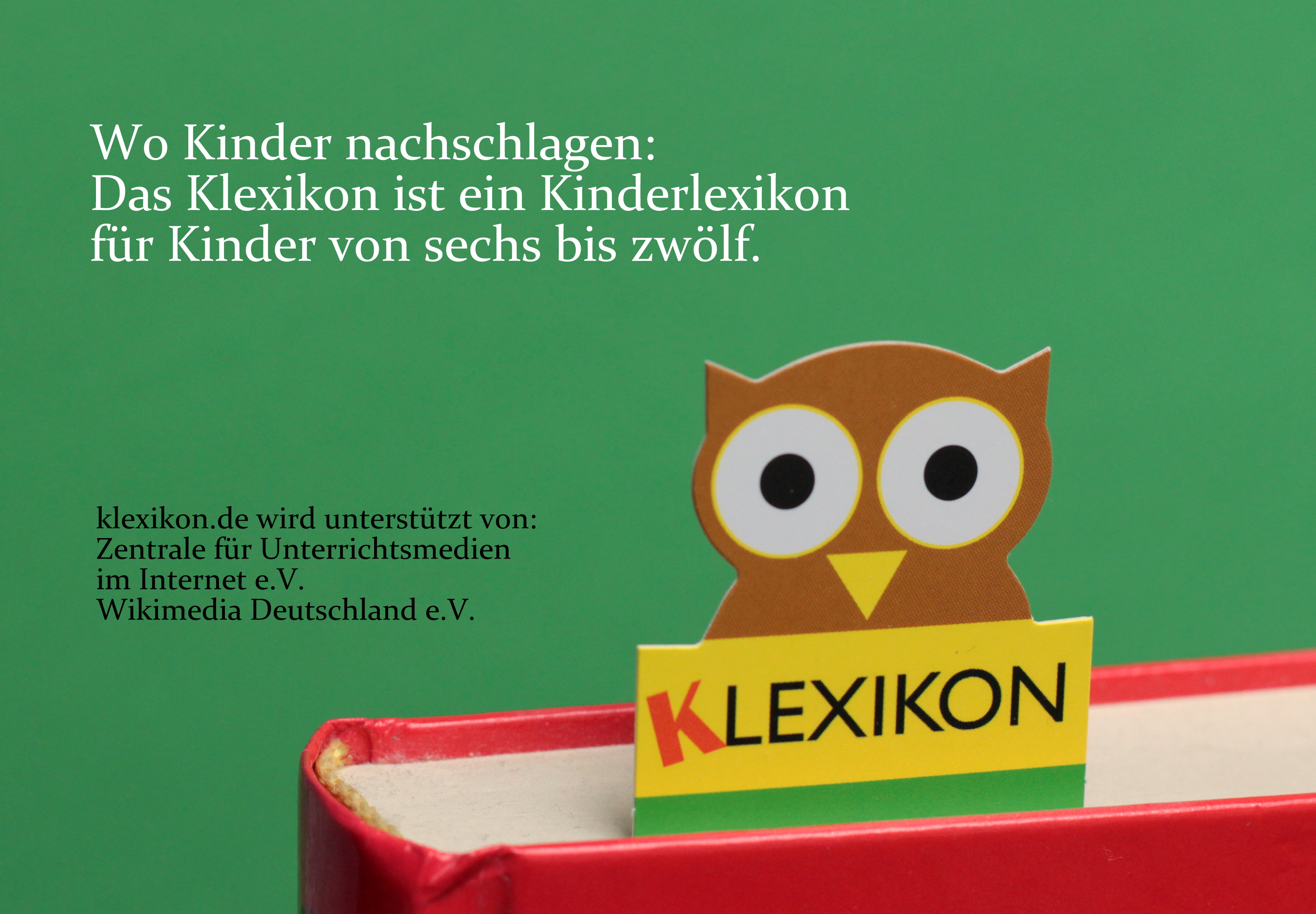
- The Klexikon logo displays an owl as a symbol of wisdom and knowledge.
- Website type: Encyclopedia
- Available in: German
- Owner: Zentrale für Unterrichtsmedien im Internet
- Website: klexikon.zum.de
- Commercial: No
- Registration: Mandatory
- Launched: December 2014; 11 years ago
- Content license: Creative Commons By Attribution Share-alike v. 3.0
- Written in: MediaWiki

Klexikon is a German-language online encyclopedia for children aged six to twelve years. It was launched in December 2014. The name Klexikon is a portmanteau combining the two German words Kinder [children] and Lexikon [encyclopedia]. Like its role model Wikipedia, the site was created as a wiki using the MediaWiki software. The text content is available under a Creative Commons By Attribution Share-alike version 3.0 licence while free media is taken from Wikimedia Commons. Special rules were implemented to ensure that all content is suitable for children. Moreover, all editors are required to register with an email address.

== History ==
The Klexikon encyclopedia was founded by journalist Michael Schulte and historian Ziko van Dijk, who was the chairman of Wikimedia Netherlands from 2011 to 2014. The website is owned by non-profit association Zentrale für Unterrichtsmedien im Internet [online educational media centre] which also hosts other types of Wikis.

One year after its launch, Klexikon consisted of 1,000 articles and 1,500 articles had been created after two years. The Klexikon community of editors decides per consensus which articles should be created next so as to assure that the most important topics, school subjects and areas of interest of children are covered.

Klexikon was supported by Wikimedia Germany in creating the concept of an online encyclopedia for children. The concept was then refined by cooperating with Technical University of Dortmund and Technical University of Cologne.

== Reception ==
The German Federal Ministry of Family Affairs, Senior Citizens, Women and Youth considers the site a "useful" children's encyclopedia. According to the voluntary self control association of German television, Klexikon's advantage is that unlike Wikipedia it is specifically written for children. The Austrian School Portal wrote that Klexikon was a "great work of reference" which provided content that was specifically balanced for children. The Merz magazine noted that Klexikon was an online source of information with relatively reliable content, but criticised that articles did not provide any sources. This was contrary to the need of sensitising school children for marking secondary information as such.

== Awards and nominations ==
- 2015: Pädi – der pädagogische Interaktiv-Preis [The Pedagogical Interactive Prize]
- 2016: Nominated for the 2016 Open educational resources award in the category "educational fusion"
- 2017: OER Award in the category "School Education"
- 2018: "Innovation for Germany" at the Land of Ideas competition
- 2022: "Seitenstark Seal of Approval for Digital Children's Media", awarded by Seitenstark e. V. and the Federal Ministry for Family Affairs, Senior Citizens, Women and Youth
