= Erich Mühsam =

German anarchist writer (1878–1934)

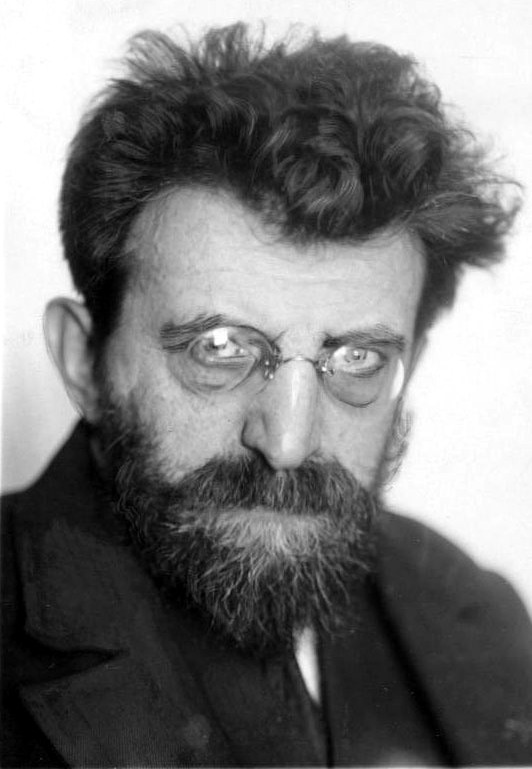
- Mühsam in 1928
- Born: 6 April 1878; Berlin, Imperial Germany
- Died: 10 July 1934 (aged 56); Oranienburg concentration camp, Nazi Germany
- Occupations: Poet, writer, playwright, and cabaret performer
- Movement: Anarchism, Anti-militarism

Erich Mühsam (6 April 1878 – 10 July 1934) was a German antimilitarist anarchist essayist, poet and playwright. He emerged at the end of World War I as one of the leading agitators for a federated Bavarian Soviet Republic, for which he served five years in prison.

Also a cabaret performer, he achieved international prominence during the years of the Weimar Republic for works which, before Adolf Hitler came to power in 1933, condemned Nazism and satirized the future dictator. Mühsam was tortured and murdered in the Oranienburg concentration camp in 1934.

== Biography ==
=== Early life: 1878–1900 ===
The third child born to Siegfried Seligmann Mühsam, a middle-class Jewish pharmacist, and his wife Rosalie (née Cohn), Erich Mühsam was born in Berlin on 6 April 1878. He had two siblings Hans and Charlotte. Soon after, the family moved to the city of Lübeck.

Mühsam was educated at the Katharineum-Gymnasium in Lübeck, a school known for its authoritarian discipline and corporal punishment, which served as the model for several of the settings in Thomas Mann's novel Buddenbrooks (1901). The young student Erich, who was by nature rebellious and resisted the school's regimented programme, was often physically punished. It was in the spirit of this resistance that, in January 1896, Mühsam authored an anonymous submission to the Lübecker Volksboten, denouncing one of the school's more unpleasant teachers, which caused a scandal. When his identity became known, Mühsam was expelled from the Katharineum-Gymnasium for sympathising and participating in socialist activities. He completed his education in Parchim.

From an early age, Mühsam displayed a talent for writing and desired to become a poet – a career aspiration his father sought to beat out of him. His juvenilia consisted of animal fables, and he was first published at the age of 16, earning small amounts of money for satirical poems based on local news and political happenings. However, at the insistence of his father, young Erich set out to study pharmacy, a profession which he quickly abandoned to return to his poetic and literary ambitions. Mühsam left Lübeck for Berlin to pursue a literary career, later writing of his youth that "My hatred grows when I look back on it and visualise the unspeakable flailings which were supposed to beat out of me all my innate feelings."

=== Poet, writer and anarchist: 1900–1918 ===
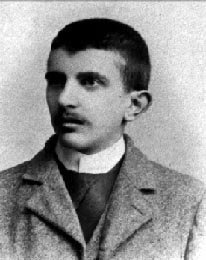
Erich Mühsam as a young man, c. 1894

Mühsam moved to Berlin in 1900, where he soon became involved in a group called Neue Gemeinschaft (New Society) under the direction of Julius and Heinrich Hart which combined socialist philosophy with theology and communal living in the hopes of becoming "a forerunner of a socially united great working commune of humanity." Within this group, Mühsam became acquainted with Gustav Landauer who encouraged his artistic growth and compelled the young Mühsam to develop his own activism based on a combination of communist and anarchist political philosophy that Landauer introduced to him. Desiring more political involvement, in 1904, Mühsam withdrew from Neue Gemeinschaft and relocated temporarily to an artists commune in Ascona, Switzerland where vegetarianism was mixed with communism and socialism. It was here that he began writing plays, the first Die Hochstapler (The Con Men), juxtaposing new modern political theory within traditional dramatic forms, which became a typical trademark of his dramatic work. During these years, Mühsam began contributing to and editing several anarchist journals. These writings made Mühsam the target of constant police surveillance and arrests as he was considered among the most dangerous anarchist agitators in Germany. The press seized the opportunity to portray him as a villain accused of anarchist conspiracies and petty crimes.

In 1908, Mühsam relocated to Munich, where he became heavily involved in cabaret. While Mühsam did not particularly care for his work in writing cabaret songs, it would become among his most famous creations.

In 1911, Mühsam founded the newspaper, Kain (Cain), as a forum for anarcho-communist ideologies, stating that it would "be a personal organ for whatever the editor, as a poet, as a citizen of the world, and as a fellow man had on his mind." Mühsam used Kain to ridicule the German state and what he perceived as excesses and abuses of authority, standing out in favour of abolishing capital punishment, and opposing the government's attempt at censoring theatre, and offering prophetic and perceptive analysis of international affairs. For the duration of World War I, publication was suspended to avoid government-imposed censorship often enforced against private newspapers that disagreed with the imperial government and the war.

Mühsam married Kreszentia Elfinger (nickname Zenzl), the widowed daughter of a Bavarian farmer, in 1915.

World War I would see the international anarchist community starkly divided into pro-war and anti-war positions, some hyper-nationalistically supporting Germany, others desiring that Germany's enemies (the United Kingdom, France, and later the United States of America) would be victorious. Mühsam became extremely nationalistic and militant in his support of Germany in the war, writing in his diaries: "And I the anarchist, the anti-militarist, the enemy of national slogans, the anti-patriot and implacable critic of the armament furies, I discovered myself somehow possessed by the common intoxication, fired by an irate passion." His public support of the war was seized upon by the state-controlled press for the purposes of propaganda, and by fellow anarchists who felt betrayed. However, by the end of 1914, Mühsam, pressured by his anarchist acquaintances renounced his support of the war effort, stating that "I will probably have to bear the sin of betraying my ideals for the rest of my life" and appealing, "Those who comfortably acquiesce and say 'we cannot change things' shamefully desecrate human dignity and all the gifts of their own hearts and brain. For they renounce without a struggle every use of their ability to overthrow man-made institutions and governments and to replace them with new ones." For the rest of the war, Mühsam opposed the war through increased involvement in many direct action projects, including workers strikes, often collaborating with figures from other leftist political parties. As the strikes became increasingly successful and violent, the Bavarian state government began mass arrests of anti-war agitators. Mühsam was among those arrested and incarcerated in April 1918. He would be detained until just before the war's end in November 1918.

=== Weimar years: 1918–1933 ===
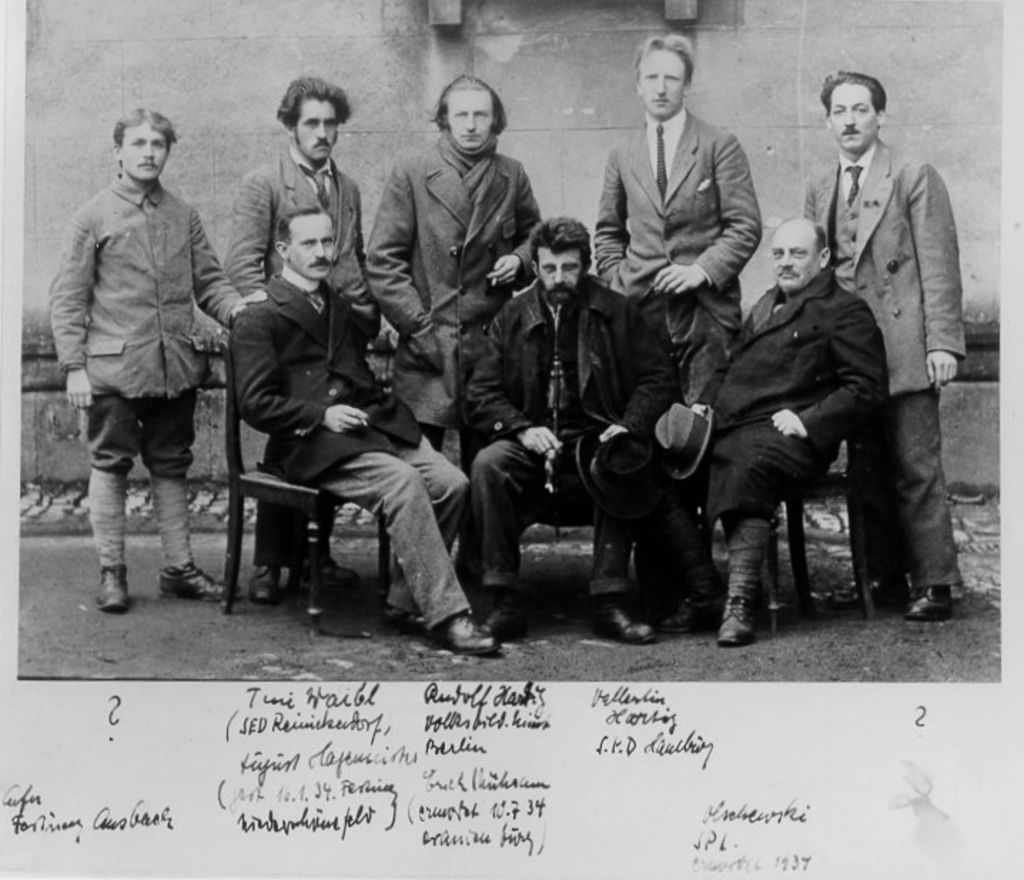
Erich Mühsam (seated center) with other leaders of the Bavarian Soviet Republic in prison, 1920

When Erich Mühsam was released on 3 November 1918, he returned to Munich. Within days, Kaiser Wilhelm II of Germany abdicated as did King Ludwig III who had semi-autonomous rule in Bavaria, and Munich was in the throes of revolt. Kurt Eisner of the Independent Socialist Party declared Bavaria a socialist republic during the Red Bavaria Revolution. Eisner, in a gesture designed to bring the anarchists into the new government, offered a ministry position to Mühsam, who refused, preferring to fight along with Gustav Landauer, Ernst Toller, Ret Marut and other anarchists for the development of Worker's Councils (Soviets) and communes.

However, after Eisner's assassination in 1919, the Bayerische Räterepublik (Bavarian Soviet Republic) was proclaimed, ruled by independent socialist Ernst Toller and anarchists Gustav Landauer and Erich Mühsam. This government was short-lived, lasting six days, being overthrown by communists led by Eugen Levine. However, during this time, the Bavarian Soviet Republic declared war on Switzerland. When the Weimar Republic's Freikorps crushed the rebellion and took possession of Munich, Gustav Landauer was killed and Mühsam arrested and sentenced to fifteen years in fortress confinement (Festungshaft).

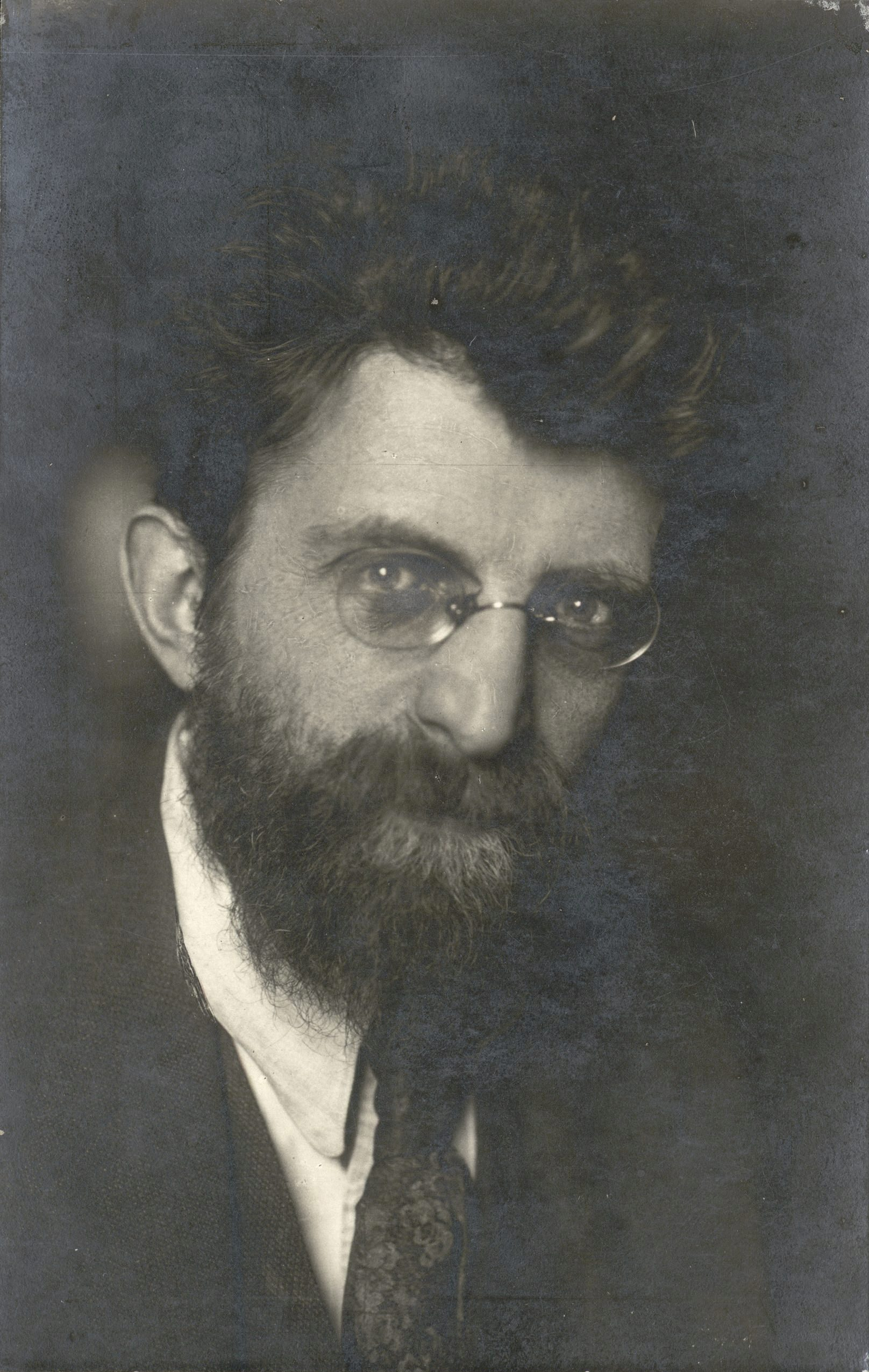
Erich Mühsam, 1924

While in jail, Mühsam was very prolific with his writing, completing the play Judas (1920), and a large number of poems. In 1924, he was released from jail as the Weimar Republic granted a general amnesty for political prisoners. Also released in this amnesty was Adolf Hitler, who had served eight months of a five-year sentence for leading the Beer Hall Putsch in 1923.

The Munich to which Mühsam returned was very different from the one he left after his arrest. The people were largely apathetic, in part because of the economic collapse of Germany under the pressure of reparations for World War I and hyperinflation. He had attempted to restart the journal Kain which failed after a few issues. In 1926, Mühsam founded a new journal which he called Fanal (The Torch), in which he openly and precariously criticized the communists and the far Right-wing conservative elements within the Weimar Republic. During these years, his writings and speeches took on a violent, revolutionary tone, and his active attempts to organize a united front to oppose the radical Right provoked intense hatred from conservatives and nationalists within the Republic.

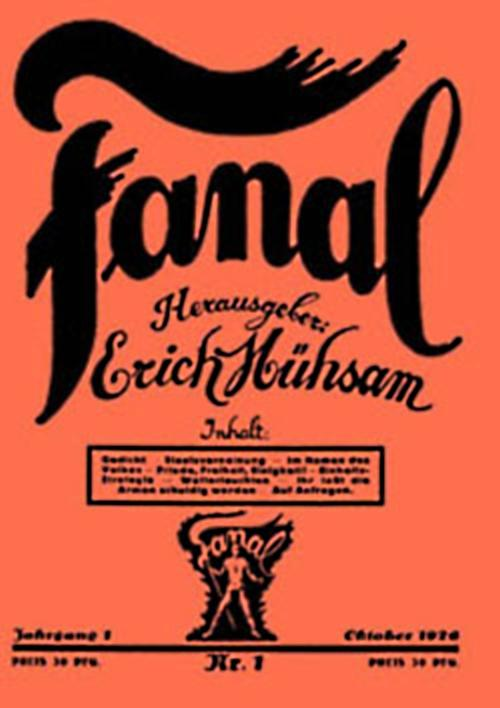
First edition of Fanal (1926)

Mühsam specifically targeted his writings to satirize the growing phenomenon of Nazism, which later raised the ire of Adolf Hitler and Joseph Goebbels. Die Affenschande (1923), a short story, ridiculed the racial doctrines of the Nazi party, while the poem Republikanische Nationalhymne (1924) attacked the German judiciary for its disproportionate punishment of leftists while barely punishing the right wing participants in the Putsch.

In 1928, Erwin Piscator produced Mühsam's third play, Staatsräson (For reasons of State), based upon the controversial conviction and execution of Nicola Sacco and Bartolomeo Vanzetti in the United States.

In 1930, Mühsam completed his last play Alle Wetter (All Hang), which sought mass revolution as the only way to prevent a radical Right-wing seizure of power. This play, never performed in public, was directed exclusively at criticizing the Nazis who were on the rise politically in Germany.

=== Arrest and death ===
Mühsam was arrested without charges in the early morning hours of 28 February 1933, within a few hours after the Reichstag fire in Berlin. Joseph Goebbels, the Nazi propaganda minister, labelled him as one of "those Jewish subversives." It is alleged that Mühsam was planning to flee to Switzerland within the next day. Over the next seventeen months, he would be imprisoned in the concentration camps at Sonnenburg, Brandenburg and finally, Oranienburg.

Marinus van der Lubbe, an alleged Communist agitator, was arrested and blamed for the fire, and his association with Communist organizations led Adolf Hitler to declare a state of emergency, encouraging aging president Paul von Hindenburg to sign the Reichstag Fire Decree, abolishing most of the human rights provisions of the Weimar Republic's constitution (1919). Hitler used the state of emergency to justify the arrests of large numbers of German intellectuals labelled as communists, socialists, and anarchists in both retaliation for the attack and to silence opposition for his increasing suppression of civil liberties.

A contemporary English-language Anarchist publication, Man!: a journal of the anarchist ideal and movement, claimed that:

After breaking his teeth with musket blows; stamping a swastika on his scalp with a red-hot brand; subjecting him to tortures which caused him to be taken into a hospital, even now the fascist hyenas of the Sonninburg concentration camp continue their beastly attacks upon this defenseless man. The last news are really atrocious: the Nazi forced our comrade to dig his own grave and then with a simulated execution made him go through the agony of a doomed man. Although his body has been reduced to a mass of bleeding and tumefied flesh, his spirit is still very high: when his traducers tried to force him to sing the Horst-Wessel-Lied (the Nazi's anthem) he defied their anger by singing the Internationale.

On 2 February 1934, Mühsam was transferred. The beatings and torture continued, until finally on the night of 9 July 1934, Mühsam was tortured and murdered by the guards, his battered corpse found hanging in a latrine the next morning.

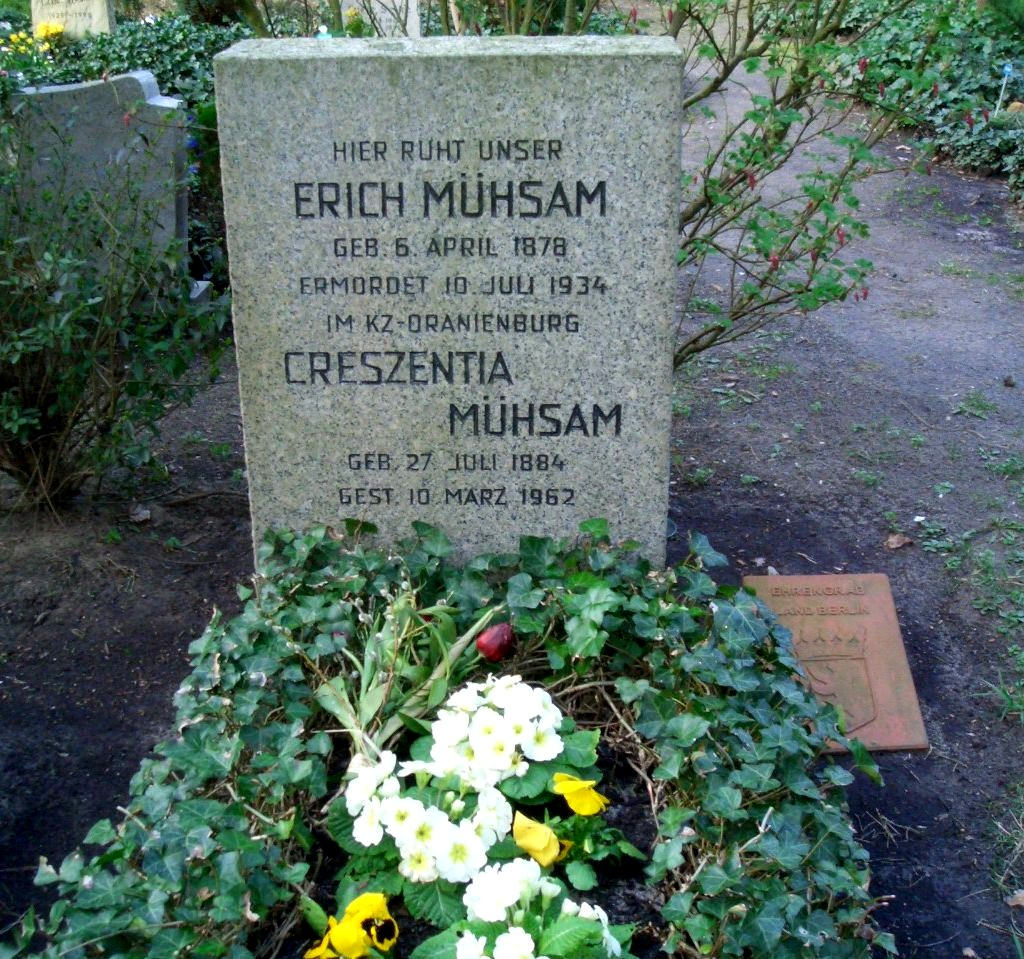
Mühsam's gravestone in Berlin, Waldfriedhof Dahlem. In memoriam his wife Zenzl Mühsam

An official Nazi report dated 11 July stated that Erich Mühsam committed suicide, hanging himself while in "protective custody" at Oranienburg. However, a report from Prague on 20 July 1934 in The New York Times stated otherwise

His widow declared this evening that, when she was first allowed to visit her husband after his arrest, his face was so swollen by beating that she could not recognise him. He was assigned to the task of cleaning toilets and staircases and Storm Troopers amused themselves by spitting in his face, she added. On 8 July she saw him for the last time alive. Despite the tortures he had undergone for fifteen months, she declared, he was cheerful, and she knew at once when his "suicide" was reported to her three days later that it was untrue. When she told the police that they had "murdered" him, she asserted they shrugged their shoulders and laughed. A post mortem examination was refused, according to Frau Mühsam, but Storm Troopers, incensed with their new commanders, showed her the body which bore unmistakable signs of strangulation, with the back of the skull shattered as if Herr Mühsam had been dragged across the parade ground.

After the death, publications would accuse Theodor Eicke, the former commander of the concentration camp at Dachau, as the murderer, aided by two Sturmabteilung (Storm Troopers) officers identified as Ehrath and Konstantin Werner. It was alleged that he was tortured and beaten until he lost consciousness, followed by an injection that killed him, and that Mühsam's body was taken to a latrine in the rear of the building and hung on a rafter so as to create the impression that Mühsam had committed suicide.

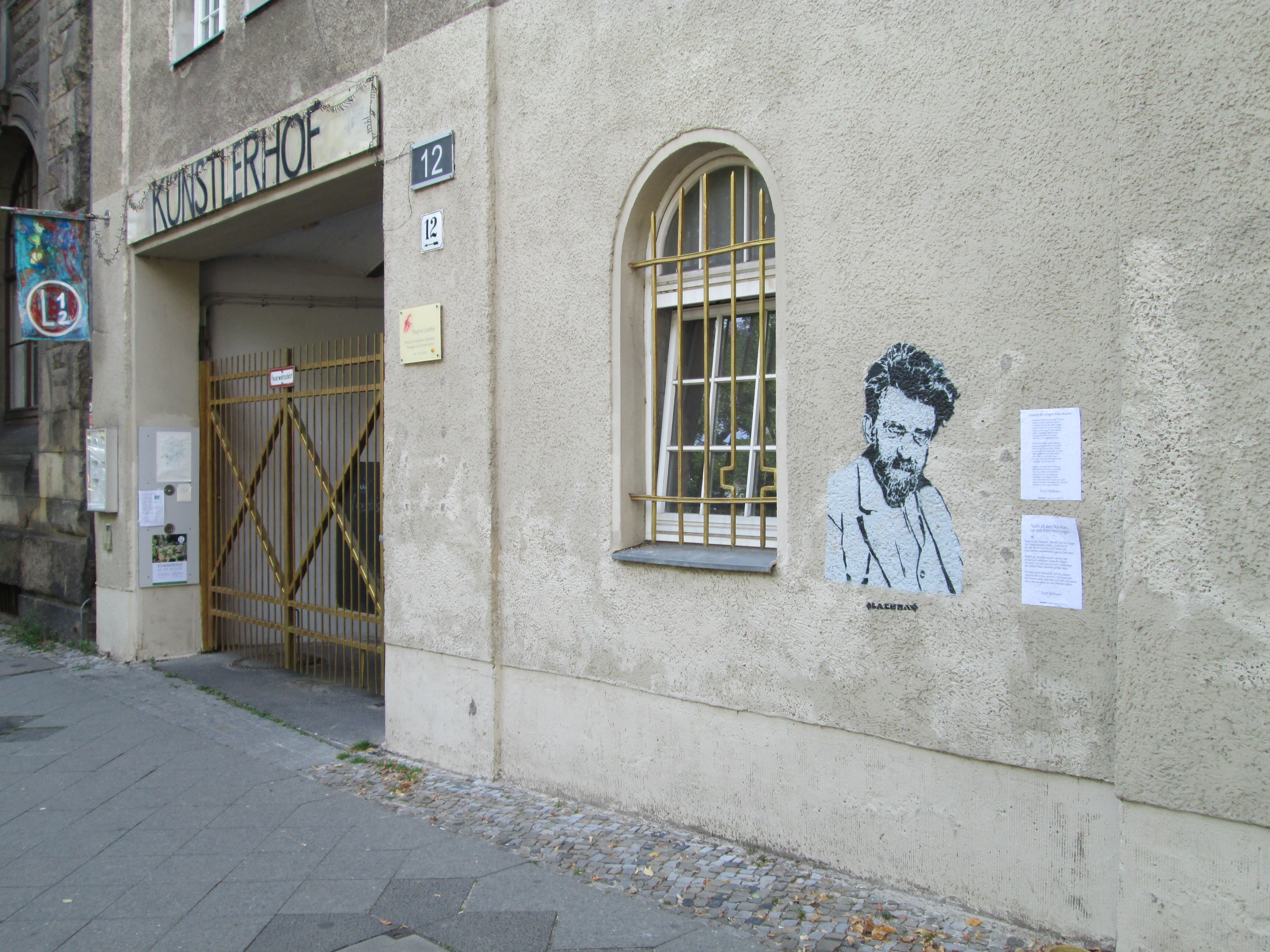
In 2019, Berlin street artist Lacuna painted several portraits at houses in Berlin, where Mühsam once lived.

== Bibliography ==
=== Books ===
- Die Homosexualität. Ein Beitrag zur Sittengeschichte unserer Zeit (1903). English (2024) Homosexuality: A Contribution to the History of Morals of Our Times. Translated by Michael Lombardi-Nash. Jacksonville, FL: Urania Manuscripts ISBN 9798321500514
- Räterepublik (1929)
- Die Befreiung der Gesellschaft vom Staat (1932)
- Unpolitische Erinnerungen (trans. Unpolitical Remembrances) (1931) – an autobiography
- Liberating Society from the State and Other Writings (2011) - comprehensive selection of Mühsam texts in English, edited and translated by Gabriel Kuhn

=== Plays ===
- Die Hochstapler (The Con Men) (1904)
- Im Nachthemd durchs Leben (1914)
- Die Freivermählten (1914)
- Judas (1920)
- Staatsräson (Reasons of State) (1928)
- Alle Wetter (All Hang) (1930)

=== Poetry ===
- Der wahre Jacob (1901)
- Die Wüste (1904)
- Der Revoluzzer (1908)
- Der Krater (1909)
- Wüste-Krater-Wolken (1914)
- Brennende Erde (1920)
- Republikanische Nationalhymne (1924)
- Revolution. Kampf-, Marsch- und Spottlieder (1925)

=== Journals and periodicals ===
- Kain: Zeitschrift für Menschlichkeit (Cain: Magazine for Humanity) 1911–1914, 1918–1919, 1924 (brief)
- Fanal (The Torch) 1926–1933
- Contributed to anarchist journals Der Freie Arbeiter (The Free Worker), Der Weckruf (The Alarm Call), Der Anarchist (The Anarchist), Neue Gemeinschaft (New Community) and Kampf (Struggle) and edited Der Arme Teufel (The Poor Devil) under the pseudonym "Nolo."

== See also ==
- Anarchism in Germany
- Holocaust
- Weimar culture
