= Swiss Biographical Archive =

The Swiss Biographical Archives (Schweizer biographisches Archiv; Archives biographiques Suisses; Archivio biografico svizzero; SBA) are biographical reference books which were published from 1952 to 1958 in 6 volumes by Willy Keller at EPI Verlag internationaler Publikationen in Zürich. It contains short biographies of Swiss people who played a role in the cultural, economic, political and military life and sports of the country at that time.

It is one of the (many) references of the German Biographical Index (Deutsches Biographisches Archiv).
