= Agent*In =

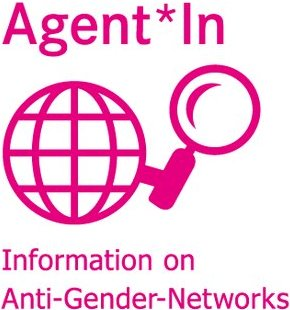
- Website type: Online encyclopedia
- Available in: German
- Owner: Heinrich Böll Foundation
- Website: agentin.org
- Commercial: No
- Launched: 17 July 2017

Agent*In (Anti-Gender-Networks-Information) was a German wiki-based online encyclopedia of the Heinrich Böll Foundation that describes itself as critical of anti-feminism. The contributing editors were Henning von Bargen, Andreas Kemper and Elisabeth Tuider. After criticism from the German media (e.g., Die Welt, Der Tagesspiegel) the website went "temporarily offline." In November 2017 the Heinrich Böll Foundation stated that they will not continue the project.
