= Kürschners Deutscher Gelehrten-Kalender =

German encyclopaedia of European scholars

Kürschners Deutscher Gelehrten-Kalender (English: "Kürschner's Encyclopedia of German Scholars"), formerly subtitled Lexikon der lebenden deutschsprachigen Wissenschaftler ("Encyclopedia of Living German-Speaking Scholars"), is a German language biographical and bibliographical encyclopedia of scientists and scholars from the German-speaking part of Europe. It is published by Walter de Gruyter. The first edition appeared in 1925, edited by Gerhard Lüdtke. Prior to the 9th edition, it consisted of one volume, but with the 6th edition in 1941 and then again from the 9th in 1961 it was extended to two volumes. Since the 22nd edition in 2009, it includes four volumes. The 28th edition appeared in 2016. The encyclopedia generally only includes academics who are active researchers at universities or research institutes, and who hold the Habilitation or are full professors, or have equivalent qualifications.

It evolved from Kürschners Deutscher Literatur-Kalender, a bio-bibliographical encyclopedia of German literature founded in 1879 and subsequently edited by Joseph Kürschner, for whom both works are now named.
