= Ripuarian Wikipedia =

Ripuarian-language edition of Wikipedia

Wikipedia of Ripuarian languages

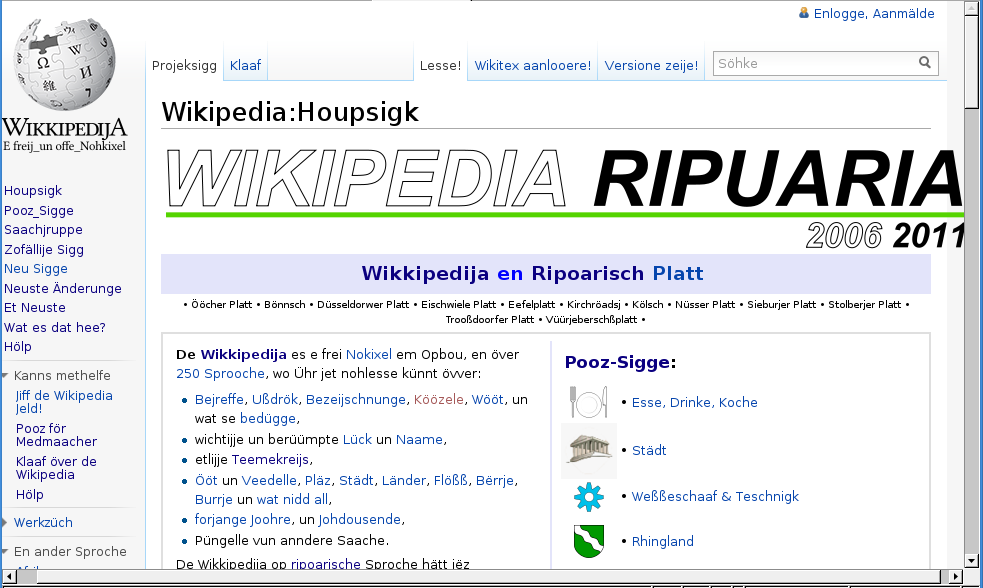
- Screenshot The Main Page of the Ripuarian Wikipedia as of July 2011
- Website type: Internet encyclopedia project
- Available in: Ripuarian
- Owner: Wikimedia Foundation
- Website: ksh.wikipedia.org
- Commercial: No
- Registration: Optional
- Launched: 6 July 2005
- Content license: Creative Commons Attribution/ Share-Alike 4.0 (most text also dual-licensed under GFDL); Media licensing varies

The Ripuarian Wikipedia (Kölsch: Wikipedia op Ripoarisch Platt) is the Ripuarian edition of Wikipedia. It was started on 6 July 2005, as WiKoelsch, on a private server, and was converted to an official Wikipedia during April 2006. As only about a million people speak the Ripuarian languages, the Ripuarian Wikipedia is relatively small. Since both the use of Ripuarian, and the population capable of using a Ripuarian language, are decreasing, it is also an endangered language Wikipedia. The total number of edits on this Wikipedia is 1,610,412.

== History ==
=== Preparation phase ===
The first discussions about a Wikipedia, originally focused on Colognian but then considering all Ripuarian languages, started in 2004 on the German Wikipedia. Ripuarian languages are spoken mainly in the District Cologne in the South-West of North Rhine-Westphalia in Germany and smaller adjacent areas in Rhineland-Palatinate, Belgium, and the Netherlands.

The WiKoelsch logo

During the first half of 2005, the idea condensed and a first small group of contributors were willing to try it. One of them installed MediaWiki on his own server and made it available under the domain wikoelsch.dergruenepunk.de for everyone willing to contribute to it on 6 July 2005. After a phase of initial silence, slightly more than 1000 pages were created in the remainder of the year. Roughly half of them were stub pages and disambiguation pages, for instance about abbreviations.

In September 2004, a request had already been made to create a Wikipedia for Ripuarian languages, which spurred a discussion that finally led to the acceptance of the proposal by the Wikimedia Foundations board of trustees two days before Christmas that the same year. Although the Wikipedia is dedicated to all Ripuarian languages, it was - pars pro toto - to be created with the identifier ksh for the wiki and interlanguage links to it. That was a SIL code, which was later to become an ISO 639-3 code. It refers solely to the Colognian language, the biggest and best documented Ripuarian variety. The ISO 639 joint advisory committee had refused to add ksh to the ISO 639-2, and to create a code for the Ripuarian group at that time.

On 24 March 2005, the new wiki was set up under the domain ksh.wikipedia.org.

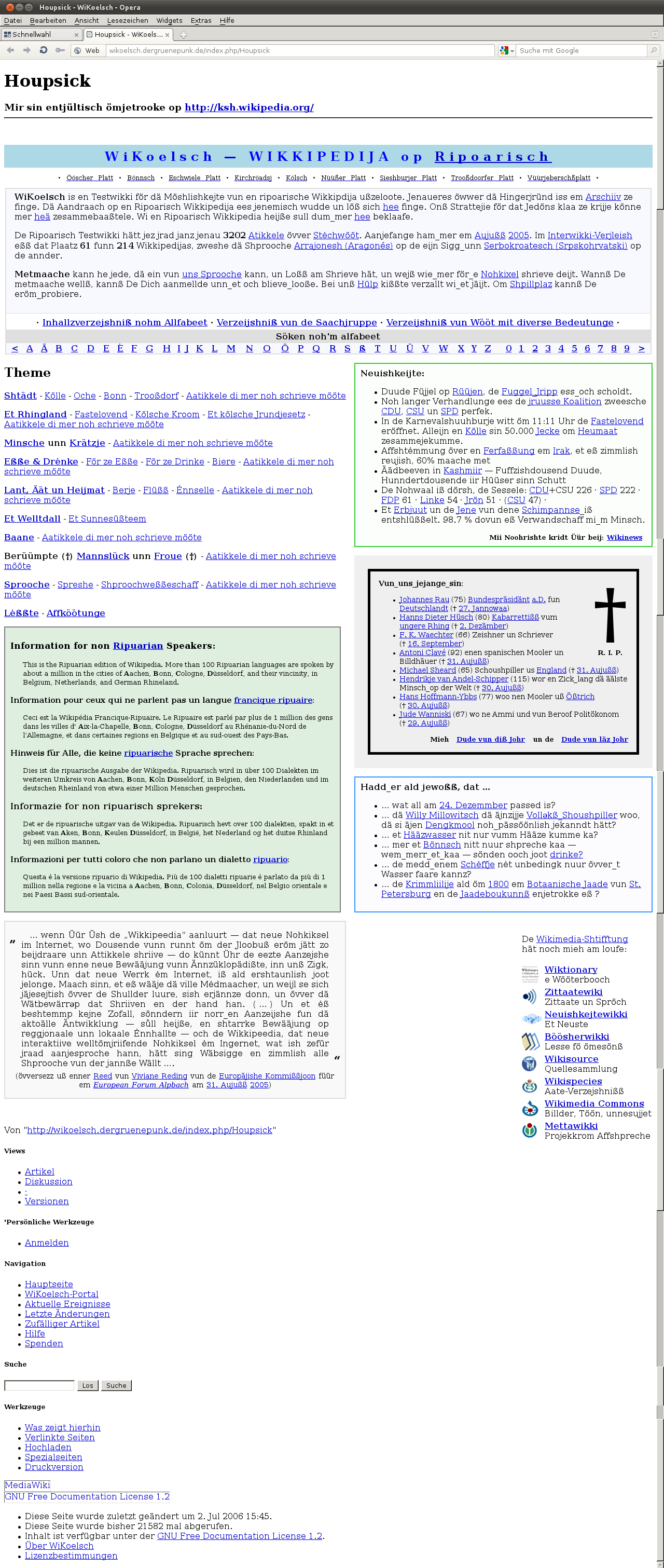
Screenshot of the main page of the WiKoelsch wiki after the Wikipedia of the Ripuarian languages had become operative.

=== Transition ===
When the new wiki was created on the server cluster of the Wikimedia Foundation, under the domain ksh.wikipedia.org, and was going to be used, a series of outages of the test website delayed copying content from there. Also, it was not possible to transfer data directly from one SQL server to the other, thus the newly developed page export and import feature of MediaWiki had to be used. Several bugs and deficiencies were detected during the process and had to be overcome. Since it was not possible to transfer user accounts and passwords, a volunteer developed and hosted a dual login web page allowing users to supply two username/password pairs, which were automatically verified against either wiki. If successful, a public list of user name pairs was updated so that user continuity and proper attribution was guaranteed. Towards the end of April 2006, the Wikipedia eventually became usable with page data and its history, but cleaning up the various remaining problems left behind by the transition took several more months.

The WiKoelsch wiki was kept online for quite a while. It went offline as late as early fall 2007. It is, to some degree, available on the Internet Archive.

=== Wikipedia ===
Though a Colognian localization of MediaWiki had already been begun during the preparation phase, it was incomplete and had in part become outdated. With the advent of the Wikipedia, a new move was made to continue collaboratively; initially in the German Wikipedia and later, since mid-2006, in the Ripuarian one. Although it had been planned to provide at least two varieties of Ripuarian, that did not work out due to a series of mishaps. In the last days of August 2006, only one of the localizations went online.

Towards the end of the year 2006, a series of harsh and, in part, unnecessarily personal arguments were held about the spellings in the Wikipedia of Ripuarian languages. They led to almost two months of edit-warring and an apparently non-serious proposal of a Colognian-only Wikipedia. In early 2007, some regular, productive contributors withdrew.

On 9 January 2009, the ksh Wikipedia was mentioned in its own short article in a local newspaper.

== Statistics ==
There are 3,038 articles on this edition of Wikipedia and a total of 10,814 pages. This language edition has an article depth of 976, compared to the English Wikipedia's 1376. As of 27 September 2026, this is the Wikipedia with the third-highest article depth.

- 1,610,412 total edits were made.
- There are 25,564 registered users, including 14 active users and 4 administrators.
