= Joseph Kürschner =

German author and editor

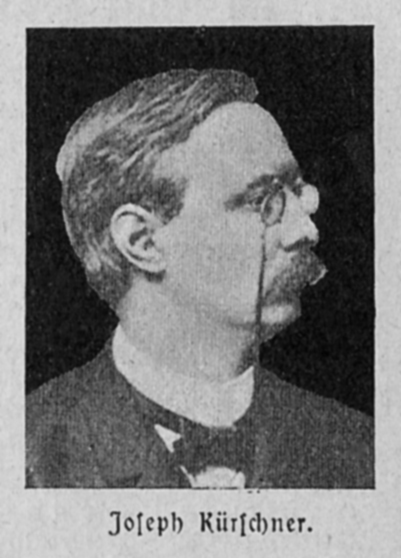

Joseph Kürschner (20 September 1853, in Gotha – 29 July 1902, on a journey to Huben) was a German author and editor most often cited for his critical edition of classics from German literature.

== Biography ==
At first engaged in mechanical engineering, he afterwards studied at the University of Leipzig. Then he lived several years in Berlin. He then managed the Stuttgart periodical Vom Fels zum Meer (1881–89). From 1880 to 1882, he was editor of Neue Zeit, official organ of German dramatical authors and composers, then from 1885 to 1886 he edited Deutsche Schriftstellerzeitung (German writers' newspaper). He was appointed literary director of the Deutsche Verlagsanstalt and moved in 1893 to Eisenach. In 1889, he was made councilor (Hofrat) and professor by Ernest II, Duke of Saxe-Coburg and Gotha. Besides several publications connected with the history of German theater, he edited successively in Berlin and Stuttgart a considerable number of literary monthlies, year-books, and other periodicals.

He was also editor of the Deutsche Nationallitteratur, a critical collection in 220 volumes of classics from German literature. He was also widely known as the editor, after 1883, of the Allgemeiner deutscher Litteraturkalender (Stuttgart, 1879 et seq.), an annual biographical record of all German authors and their works.

== Original works ==
- Konrad Ekhof (1872)
- Bayreuther Tagebuchblätter (Bayreuth diary; 1870)
- Heil Kaiser Dir! (1897)
- Frau Musika (1898)
- China (1901)
- Kaiser Wilhelm II als Soldat und Seemann (1902)
