= Heinrich and Julius Hart =

German writers and literary critics

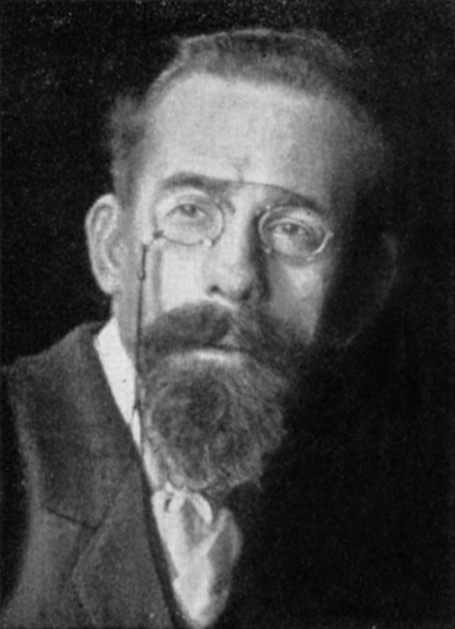
Julius Hart

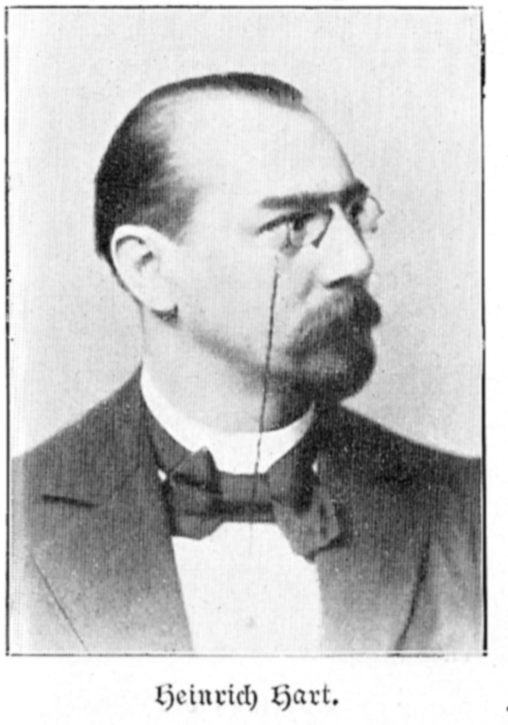
Heinrich Hart

The brothers Heinrich and Julius Hart were German writers and literary critics who collaborated closely. They were among the pioneers of naturalism in German literature.

Heinrich was born 30 December 1855, in Wesel and died 11 June 1906, in Tecklenburg. Julius was born 9 April 1859, in Münster and died 7 July 1930, in Berlin.

The Hart brothers published works of literary criticism, notably Kritische Waffengänge (parts 1–6, 1882–1884), in which they opposed the light reading chosen by the bourgeoisie.

== Works ==
- Hart, J. Sansara (1879)
- Hart, J. The Triumph of Life (1898)
- Hart, H. Gesammelte Werke, vols. 1–4. Berlin (1907)
- Hart, J. Revolution der Ästhetik. Berlin (1908)
- Hart, H. Song of Humanity, an attempt to depict the panorama of man's development from ancient times. He finished only three "songs":
  - "Tul and Nahila" (1888)
  - "Nimrod" (1888)
  - "Moses" (1896)
