= German dialects =

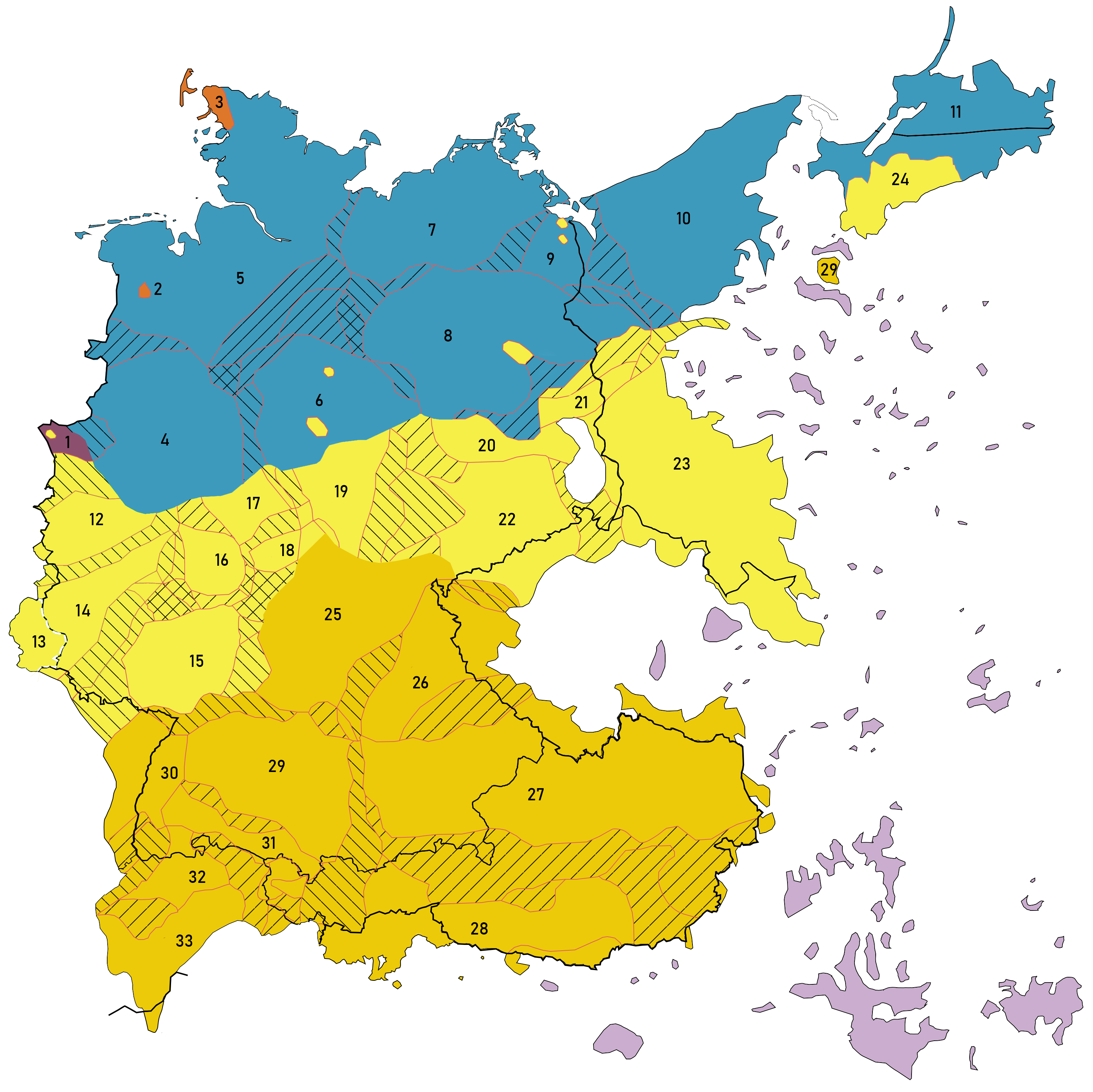
German dialects area around 1900, including all West Germanic varieties using Standard German as their literary language: Low Franconian Frisian Low German Central German Upper German

German dialects are the various traditional local varieties of the German language. Though varied by region, those of the southern half of Germany beneath the Benrath line are dominated by the geographical spread of the High German consonant shift, and the dialect continuum that connects High German to the neighboring varieties of Low Franconian (Dutch) and Low German.

The varieties of German are conventionally grouped into Upper German, Central German and Low German; Upper and Central German form the High German subgroup. Standard German is a standardized form of High German, developed in the early modern period based on a combination of Central German and Upper German varieties.

== Etymology and nomenclature ==
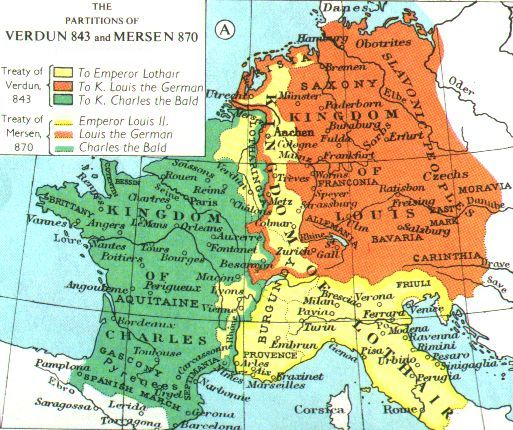
The Division of the Carolingian Empire in 843 and 870 (East Francia shown in red)

Traditionally, all of the major dialect groupings of German dialects are typically named after so-called "stem duchies" or "tribal duchies" (German: Stammesherzogtümer) by early German linguists, among whom the Brothers Grimm were especially influential. These tribal duchies came into existence at the end of the Early Middle Ages within the Holy Roman Empire and were thought to have been continuations of earlier tribal lands which were subjugated by the Franks and incorporated into their realm at the close of the Migration Period.

For example, the Germanic tribe of the Bavarii (subjugated by the Franks during the 6th century) gave their name to the later stem duchy of Bavaria (817–1180), which itself would lend its name to the traditional Bavarian dialect grouping described in the early 19th century.

As their understanding of the Second Germanic consonant shift progressed, linguists (when applicable) further divided these dialects into groupings based on their degree of participation of this consonant shift, with "Low" (German: nieder-) signifying little to no participation, "Middle" (or "Central"; German: mittel-) meaning medium to high participation and "Upper" (German: ober-) conveying high to full participation.

Because the 19th-century classification nomenclature was based primarily on historical territories rather than linguistic clusters, the traditional system can imply greater similarities between dialects than is linguistically warranted. The best-known example of this phenomenon is found within the Franconian cluster, which is divided into Low Franconian, Middle Franconian and Upper Franconian even though the Low Franconian (incl. Dutch) dialects are not most closely related to Middle and Upper Franconian dialects within the larger continuum. In fact, of all German dialects, the Low Rhenish dialect (the only Low Franconian dialect spoken in Germany itself) is the most divergent when compared to Standard German, whereas the Middle and Upper Franconian dialects are fairly similar in their overall structure and phonology to the German standard language.

As a result, the second half of the 20th century saw a shift in academic customs, with many linguists instead describing dialect clusters based on the geographical area in which they are spoken (i.e. Meuse-Rhenish or Westphalian) and their degree of participation with the Second Germanic consonant shift, or, such as in the case of the influential linguists Friedrich Maurer and Theodor Frings, creating a new framework of dialect classification altogether.

Nevertheless, in common parlance it is common for speakers of German dialects to use the traditional/older nomenclature when referring to their particular dialect, stating, for example, that they speak Saxon, Bavarian, Allemanic (Swabian), Thuringian or Franconian.

== Dialects ==
=== In relation to varieties of Standard German ===
In linguistics of German, German dialects are distinguished from varieties of Standard German.

- The German dialects are the traditional local varieties. They are traced back to the different Germanic tribes. Many of them are hardly understandable to someone who knows only Standard German, since they often differ from Standard German in lexicon, phonology and syntax. If a narrow definition of language based on mutual intelligibility is used, many German dialects are considered to be separate languages (for example, in the view of Ethnologue).
- The varieties of Standard German refer to the different local varieties of the pluricentric language Standard German. They differ only slightly in lexicon and phonology. In certain regions, they have replaced the traditional German dialects, especially the Low German of Northern Germany.

=== Dialects in Germany ===
The variation among German dialects ranges. In regions with dialects are being in the same dialectal region, pronunciation, syntax and words particular to specific towns even only a few miles apart can create even more variation. In the Black Forest region alone, there was a newspaper request for people to report what word they used for the term "Dragonfly." Sixty words were collected as reported from responders for the term.

When spoken in their purest form, Low German, most Upper German, High Franconian dialects and even some Central German dialects are unintelligible to those versed only in Standard German. However, all German dialects belong to either the dialect continuum of High German or the dialect continuum of Low German. Historically, there were extensive dialect continua across much of Continental West Germanic-speaking territory, with many contiguous dialects showing high mutual intelligibility, though this traditional dialect landscape has been substantially reduced since the mid-20th century.

The German dialect continuum is typically divided into High German and Low German. The terms derive from the geographic characteristics of the terrain in which each is found rather than depicting social status.

=== Dialects in Central Europe ===
As the result of the flight and expulsion of Germans following World War II, particularly from post-war Poland, the Czech Republic, Hungary and Yugoslavia (Danube Swabians), the territorial extent of German was considerably reduced. Significant dialects such as the East Pomeranian dialect, most varieties of Silesian German, Prussian dialects and Bohemian German dialects gradually disappeared as a result of their speakers assimilating into areas where other dialects, as well as Standard German, were already spoken.

=== Low German ===
Low German varieties (in Germany usually referred to as "Platt" or "Plattdeutsch") are considered dialects of the German language by some but a separate language by others (then often termed "Low Saxon"). Linguistically Low German (that is, Ingvaeonic ("North Sea Germanic") and Low Franconian (that is, some Istvaeonic) dialects are grouped together because both did not participate in the High German consonant shift. Low German is further divided into Dutch Low Saxon, West Low German and East Low German.

Middle Low German was the lingua franca of the Hanseatic League. It was the predominant language in Northern Germany, and several translations of the Bible were printed in Low German. That predominance changed in the 16th century. In 1534, the Luther Bible was printed by Martin Luther, and that translation is considered to be an important step towards the evolution of the Early New High German. It aimed to be understandable to an ample audience and was based mainly on High German varieties. Early New High German gained more prestige than Low Saxon and became the language of science and literature. Other factors included the Hanseatic League losing its importance around the same time (as new trade routes to Asia and the Americas were established) and the most powerful German states then being located in Middle and Southern Germany.

The 18th and 19th centuries were marked by mass education, with the language of the schools being Standard German.

Today, Low Saxon dialects are still widespread, especially among the elderly in the Northern parts of Germany. Some local media take care not to let the Low Saxon language die out, so there are several newspapers that have recurring articles in Low Saxon. The North German Broadcasting (Norddeutscher Rundfunk) also offers television programs, such as "Talk op Platt" and radio programs in Low Saxon.

On the other hand, Northern Germany is considered to be the region that speaks the purest Standard German, and in everyday life, little influence of dialect is heard. Still, there are notable differences in pronunciation, even among North German speakers such as the lengthening of vowels and differences in accentuation. There are also some North German expressions that are in use even in Standard High German but are seldom heard in Southern Germany, such as "plietsch" for "intelligent".

=== High German ===
High German is divided into Central German, High Franconian and Upper German.

Central German dialects include Ripuarian, Moselle Franconian, Rhine Franconian (incl. Hessian), Lorraine Franconian, Thuringian, Silesian, High Prussian, Lusatian dialects and Upper Saxon. They are spoken in the southeastern Netherlands, eastern Belgium, Luxembourg, parts of northeastern France and in Germany approximately between the River Main and the southern edge of the Lowlands.

High Franconian dialects are transitional dialects in between the two greater High German groups. High Franconian dialects include East Franconian and South Franconian.

Upper German dialects include Alemannic in the broad sense (incl. Alsatian, Swabian) and Bavarian (Southern Bavarian, Central Bavarian and Northern Bavarian) and are spoken in parts of northeastern France, southern Germany, Liechtenstein, Austria, and in the German-speaking parts of Switzerland and Italy.

Standard High German is based on Central and Upper German.

The Moselle Franconian varieties spoken in Luxembourg have been officially standardized and institutionalized and so are usually considered a separate language, known as Luxembourgish.

Halcnovian, Wymysorys, Sathmarisch and Transylvanian Saxon are High German dialects of Poland and Romania.

The High German varieties spoken by Ashkenazi Jews developed into a distinct language known as Yiddish, generally considered as a separate language from German, but retaining the core grammatical structure and much of the basic vocabulary of its German dialectal origins. Originating in the Rhine Valley region of medieval Germany in the 9th century, Yiddish developed into two main branches: Western Yiddish, which remained in German-speaking territories (particularly southern Germany, Alsace, Switzerland, and the Netherlands), and Eastern Yiddish, which spread eastward as Jewish communities migrated to Poland, Hungary, Bohemia, Lithuania, and areas of the Russian Empire.

Yiddish is written using Hebrew script rather than the Latin alphabet, making it one of the few Germanic languages to use a non-Latin writing system as its standard. Linguistically, both varieties of Yiddish show their closest affinities to Middle High German dialects of the 11th-14th centuries, particularly those of the Middle Rhine and Upper Rhine regions. The underlying German component appears to derive primarily from East Franconian and Bavarian-Austrian dialect features, with some Middle Franconian elements.

Map showing the Uerdingen line, which divides Low German from High German

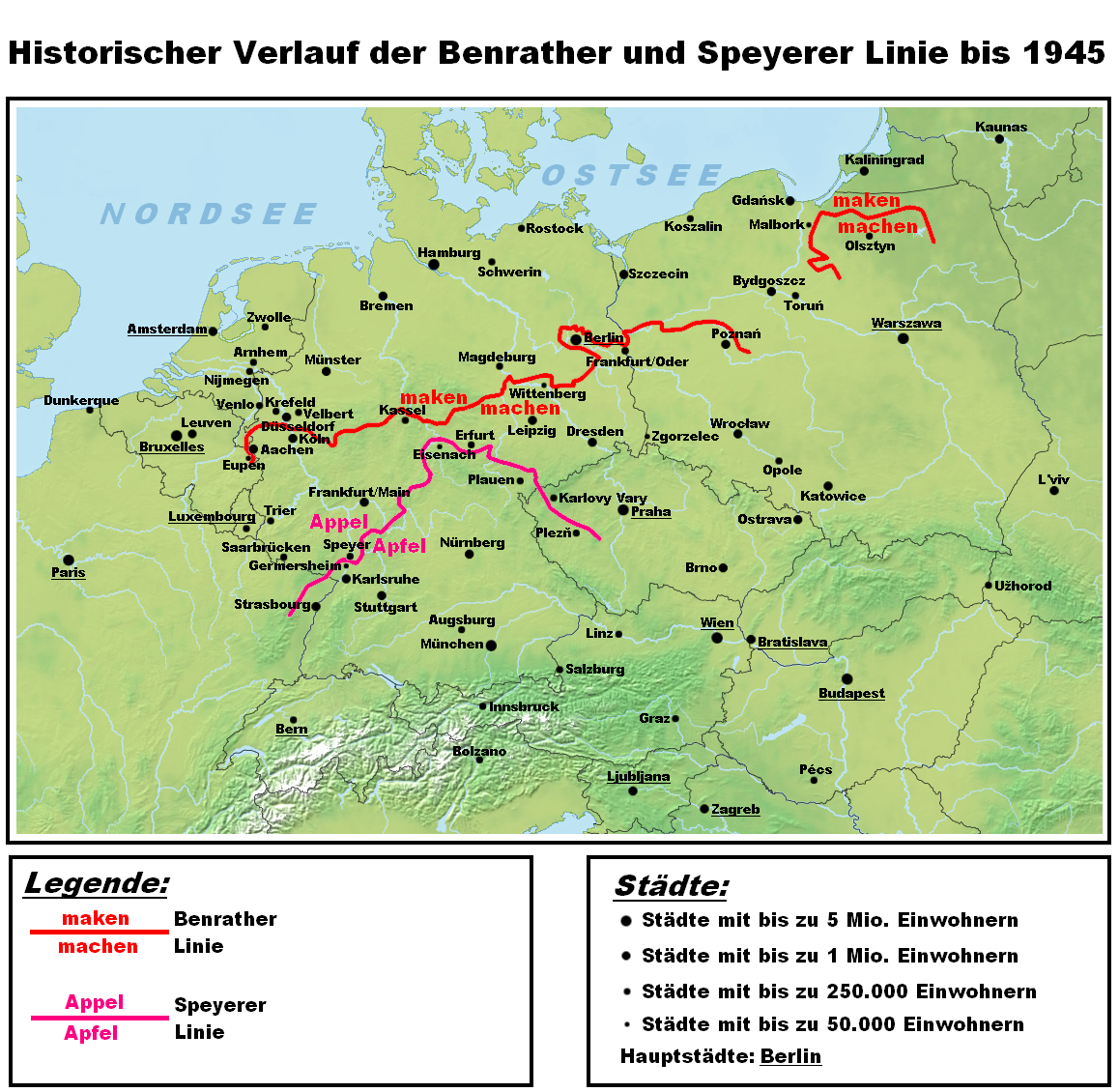
The Speyer line, dividing the Central German dialects from the High Franconian dialects

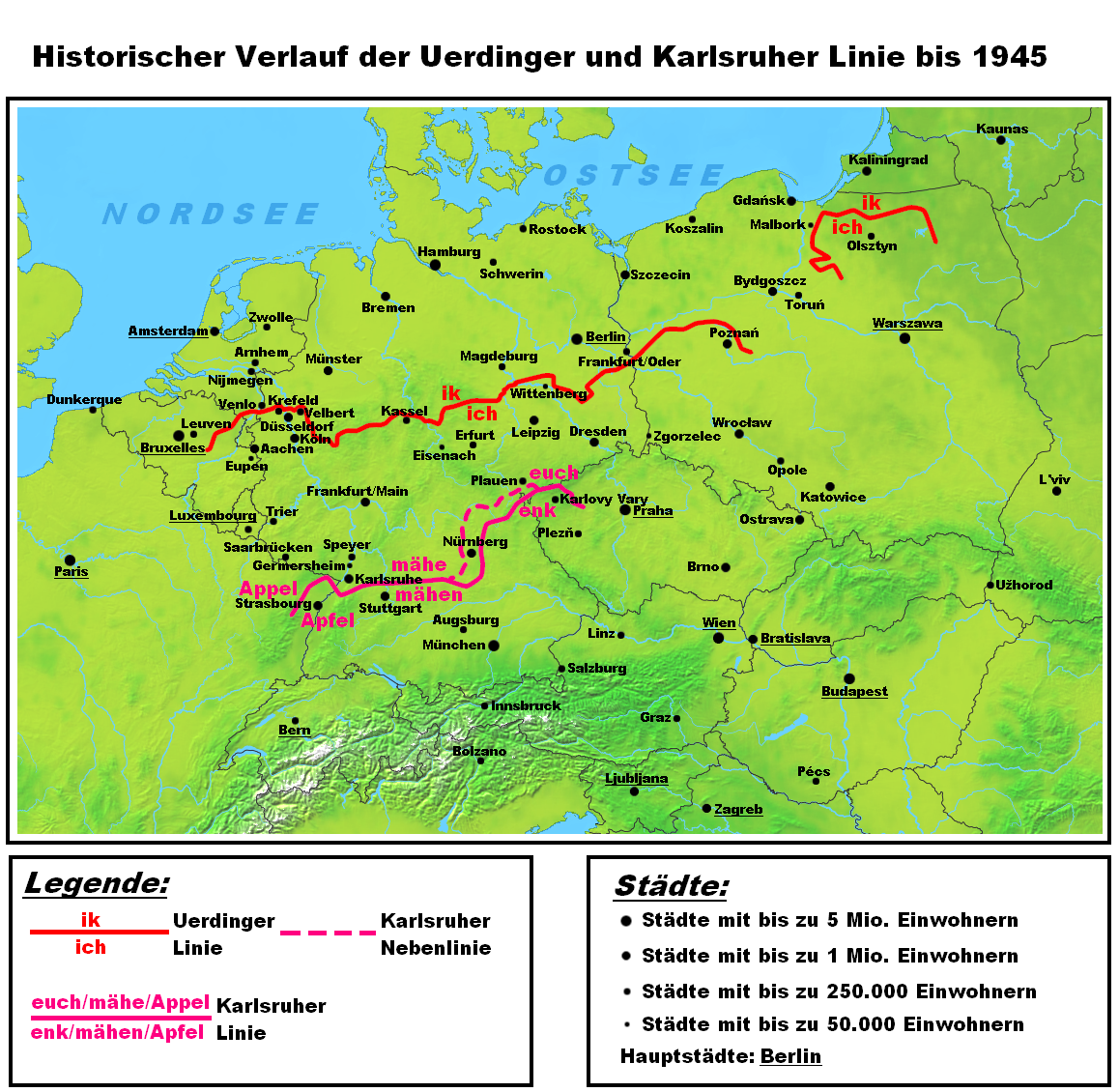
The Uerdingen and the Karlsruhe line. The Karlsruhe line divides the High Franconian dialects from the Upper German dialects.

== Overseas dialects ==
The dialects of German that are or were spoken primarily in colonies or communities founded by German-speakers resemble the dialects of the regions of the founders. For example, Pennsylvania German and Volga German resemble dialects of the Baden-Württemberg, Hutterite German resembles dialects of Carinthia and Venezuelan Alemán Coloniero is a Low Alemannic variant.

Approximate distribution of native speakers of German or a German variety outside Europe (according to Ethnologue 2016 unless referenced otherwise) Numbers of speakers should not be summed up per country, as they most likely overlap considerably. Table includes varieties with disputed statuses as separate language.
| | Standard German | Hunsrik/Hunsrückisch | Low German & Plautdietsch | Pennsylvania Dutch | Hutterite |
|---|---|---|---|---|---|
| Argentina | 400,000 | —N/a | 4,000 | —N/a | —N/a |
| Australia | 79,000 | —N/a | —N/a | —N/a | —N/a |
| Belize | —N/a | —N/a | 9,360 | —N/a | —N/a |
| Bolivia | 160,000 | —N/a | 60,000 | —N/a | —N/a |
| Brazil | 1,500,000 | 3,000,000 | 8,000 | —N/a | —N/a |
| Canada | 430,000 | —N/a | 80,000 | 15,000 | 23,200 |
| Chile | 35,000 | —N/a | —N/a | —N/a | —N/a |
| Ireland | 40,000 | —N/a | —N/a | —N/a | —N/a |
| Israel | 200,000 | —N/a | —N/a | —N/a | —N/a |
| Kazakhstan | 30,400 | —N/a | 100,000 | —N/a | —N/a |
| Mexico | —N/a | —N/a | 40,000 | —N/a | —N/a |
| Namibia | 22,500 | —N/a | —N/a | —N/a | —N/a |
| New Zealand | 36,000 | —N/a | —N/a | —N/a | —N/a |
| Paraguay | 166,000 | —N/a | 40,000 | —N/a | —N/a |
| Peru | 2,000 | —N/a | 5,000 | —N/a | —N/a |
| Russia | —N/a | —N/a | —N/a | —N/a | —N/a |
| South Africa | 12,000 | —N/a | —N/a | —N/a | —N/a |
| Uruguay | 28,000 | —N/a | 2,000 | —N/a | —N/a |
| United Kingdom | 55,000 | —N/a | —N/a | —N/a | —N/a |
| United States | 1,104,354 | —N/a | 12,000 | 118,000 | 10,800 |
| Sum | 4,599,392 | 3,000,000 | 362,360 | 133,000 | 34,000 |

=== Amana German ===
Amana German is a dialect of West Central German. It is spoken in the Amana Colonies in Iowa, which were founded by Inspirationalists of German origin. Amana is derived from Hessian, another West Central German dialect. Amana German is called Kolonie-Deutsch in Standard German.

=== Brazilian German ===
In Brazil, the largest concentrations of German speakers, German Brazilians, are in Rio Grande do Sul, where Riograndenser Hunsrückisch, and Brazilian Pomeranian were developed, especially in the areas of Santa Catarina, Paraná, Rondônia, and Espírito Santo, as well as in Petrópolis (Rio de Janeiro).

=== Chilean German ===
Lagunen-Deutsch is a variety of High German spoken in Chile.

Most speakers of Lagunen-Deutsch live around Lake Llanquihue. Lagunen-Deutsch has integrated elements of Spanish. This includes the integration of false cognates with the Spanish language, transferring the Spanish meanings into Lagunen-Deutsch.

The geographical origin of most or all speakers of Lagunen-Deutsch is Chile, to where the ancestors of the speakers immigrated from German-speaking areas of Europe in the 19th and 20th centuries. The impact of nineteenth century German immigration to southern Chile was such that Valdivia was for a while a Spanish-German bilingual city with "German signboards and placards alongside the Spanish". The prestige the German language had made it acquire qualities of a superstratum in southern Chile.

=== Venezuelan German ===
The Colonia Tovar dialect, or Alemán Coloniero, is a dialect spoken in Colonia Tovar, Venezuela, that belongs to the Low Alemannic branch of German. The dialect, like other Alemannic dialects, is not mutually intelligible with Standard German. It is spoken by descendants of Germans from the Black Forest region of southern Baden, who emigrated to Venezuela in 1843. The dialect has also acquired some Spanish loanwords.

=== American German ===
Currently 1.1 million American citizens speak German, with the most being in the Dakotas. German was at one time the lingua franca in many American regions, with high density in the Midwest, but St. Louis, Milwaukee, New Orleans, New York City and a great many others cities had a very high German-speaking population. By 1900, over 554 Standard German-language newspapers were in circulation.

The rise in American ethnic nativist pride, especially during World War I, led to a zealous push for the Americanization of hyphenated Americans to reclaim the White Anglo-Saxon Protestant hegemonic influence once again, as the surges of immigration had forever changed the dynamic nation. All things and individuals with ties to Germany were thus subjected to public harassment, distrust, or even death, such as in the lynching of Robert Prager, a German seeking to become naturalized in St. Louis.

== See also ==
- History of the German language
- German as a minority language
- Ethnic Germans
- Petuh, German vocabulary on a Danish base
- Wisconsin German
