= Ländle =

Ländle (diminutive of land in some dialects of the German language, notably Low Alemannic and Swabian) is sometimes used in German as a colloquial sobriquet for any of the following territories:

- the south-western German State of Baden-Württemberg
- the historical region of Swabia, encompassing the eastern two-thirds of Baden-Württemberg as well as the western portion of Bavaria, where the Swabian language is most primarily spoken
- the westernmost Austrian State of Vorarlberg
- the Grand Duchy of Luxembourg
- the Principality of Liechtenstein
