= Frankish language (disambiguation) =

Frankish language can refer to:

- Frankish language, the language spoken by the Franks, a Germanic people active in the Roman era
- The Low Franconian languages, the linguistic subgroup containing modern variants of the Old Frankish language: Dutch and Afrikaans
- a dialect of modern German spoken in Alsace and Lorraine (Lorraine Franconian and parts of South Franconian), regions in France
- remainder of South Franconian as well as the remainder of West Central German and

East Franconian
