= Lake Constance Alemannic =

- Bodenseealemannisch
- Language family: Indo-European: Germanic; West Germanic; Elbe Germanic; High German; Upper German; Alemannic; Lake Constance Alemannic

Language codes
- ISO 639-3: –

Lake Constance Alemannic, also known as Middle Alemannic, (German: Bodenseealemannisch or Mittelalemannisch) is a dialect of Low Alemannic German.

== The Alemanni on Lake Constance ==
In 15 BC, Emperor Augustus ordered the subjugation of the Celts and Rhaetians. Afterwards, the Romans built forts on Lake Constance in Bregenz, Arbon, Eschenz and Konstanz. The northern shore of Lake Constance was already occupied by the Alemanni by 260 AD. It took until the end of the 4th century for the Alemanni to capture the area up to the Alps.

== Distribution ==
Lake Constance Alemannic is typically spoken in the following regions:

- Southern Allgäu (Allgäuerisch)
- The Baar (Baar-Alemannic)
- The northern coast of Lake Constance and the southern portion of Upper Swabia (the southernmost part of Württemberg and southeasternmost part of Baden)
- Northern Vorarlberg, including Wälderisch in the Bregenz Forest
- Various Swiss lakeside communities on the Untersee with transitions to the dialects of Eastern Switzerland

In addition, there are various transitional areas to Swabian and High Alemannic. Traditional Lake Constance Alemannic has only been fully preserved on Höri peninsula and on the Swiss shore of the Untersee between Eschenz and Triboltingen.

The Alemannic language in the Lake Constance area has been and continues to be heavily influenced by language customs in the German states of Baden-Württemberg and Bavaria, as well as in the countries of Germany, Austria, and Switzerland. For example, skilled workers and administrative staff may not always come from the Lake Constance region, and thus bring their linguistic tendencies and influences with them.

== Characteristics ==
Lake Constance Alemannic differs from the Upper Rhine Alemannic dialects to the west, especially in the unified plural of verbs ending with „-et“ instead of „-e“, for example in the use of mähet instead of mähe (High German: „mähen/mäht/mähen“). Lake Constance Alemannic shares this feature with Swabian dialects and Swiss German dialects east of the Brünig-Napf-Reuss line.

Lake Constance Alemannic differs from the High Alemannic dialects in Switzerland and Southern Hegau to the South in that the High German Consonant Shift does not occur with the sound /k/. Thus, "child" in Lake Constance Alemannic is said as Kind instead of the High Alemannic Chind.

Even within the Konstanz district, there are differences in pronunciation. The "Larynx Line", running from Iznang to Singen (Hohentwiel) to Watterdingen, splits High Alemannic (spoken to the south) and Low Alemannic (spoken to the north). The High German word gesagt can be said as gseit, gsaat, gsoot, gsoat, or gseet, depending on the dialect.

The transition zones to Swabian in the north are fluid; in Lindau, Friedrichshafen and the Allgäu, the dialect is more often referred to as Swabian for historical and political reasons.

During the 20th century, the border with Swabian, heavily influenced by increased mobility along the Ulm-Friedrichshafen line, shifted south, moving from north of Ravensburg down to the Obersee (Lake Constance). As a result, the dialect of German currently spoken in the eastern parts of the German side of Lake Constance has moved much closer to Swabian. Although dialect maps commonly classify these dialects as Low Alemannic, the modern dialects would be more appropriately listed as Swabian.

Typical Alemannic forms, such as Huus instead of the Swabian Hous (High German: Haus), gsi instead of the Swabian gsei/gweä (High German: Gewesen), etc. are now only commonly heard further west along the High Rhine or in Switzerland. However, the use of gsi is still common among older members of the population in Linzgau and the western parts of Upper Swabia. Regardless, there is no clearly defined boundary and language habits vary greatly from place to place.
