= Frankisch =

Frankisch can refer to:

- Gewürztraminer, a wine grape
- Franconian languages spoken by the Franks
