= Kniereitvers =

German nursery rhyme

Kniereitvers (German for "a verse for riding on knees") is a nursery rhyme that is recited while two people play. Usually an older person plays with a younger one (mostly a child), with the child sitting on the older person's knee.

== Example ==
In the German language the following Kniereitvers ("Hoppe, hoppe Reiter") is most popular:

Hoppe hoppe Reiter, wenn er fällt, dann schreit er.
Fällt er in den Graben, fressen ihn die Raben.
Fällt er in den Sumpf, macht der Reiter plumps!

Hop hop rider, when he falls then he will cry,
If he falls into the ditch, the crows will eat him.
If he falls into the swamp the rider will go plop!

There are verses that have one or more lines added, for example:

Hoppe hoppe Reiter, wenn er fällt, dann schreit er.
Fällt er in den Graben, fressen ihn die Raben.
Fällt er in die Hecken, fressen ihn die Schnecken.
Fällt er in das grüne Gras, macht er sich die Hose nass.
Fällt er in das Wasser, macht er sich noch nasser.
Fällt er auf die Steine, tun ihm weh die Beine.
Fällt er in den Sumpf, macht der Reiter plumps!

Hop hop rider, when he falls then he will cry.
If he falls into the ditch, the crows will eat him.
If he falls into the hedge, the snails will eat him.
If he falls into the green grass, he will get his pants wet.
If he falls into the water, he will get even wetter.
If he falls onto the stones, his legs will hurt.
If he falls into the swamp, the rider will go plop!

There are also versions in different dialects. In Switzerland, the following example is popular:

Ryte, ryte, Rössli,
z'Bade staht es Schlössli,
z'Bade staht es goldigs Huus,
da lueged drei Mareye drus:
Die erschti, die spinnt Syde,
di zweiti schnätzlet Chryde,
di dritti, die spinnt Haberstrau,
bhüeti Gott mis Schätzeli au!

Ride, ride, little horse,
In Baden, there's a little castle
In Baden, there's a golden house,
There, three Mary's look outside.
The first one spins silk,
The second one grates chalk,
The third one spins oat straw,
May God protect my little treasure too.

Three Marys means three women. This lap verse refers to the Swiss fairy tale Die drei Mareien.

== Accompanying actions ==
While playing and singing the verses, the child sits on a parent's knees or lap facing the parent. The parent moves the knees up and down, imitating riding a horse. The parent holds on to the child's hands imitating holding reins. When it comes to the part where the parent says "the rider will go plop" the parent opens the legs or knees so that the child slips down towards the floor while holding hands the entire time. The parent will then pull the child back onto the lap.

This little acting game is a lot of fun for the child, anticipating the 'fall' from the 'horse' and being saved by the parent, staying safe and sound.
