= Vogtlandian =

High German dialect spoken in Vogtland

- Vogtländisch
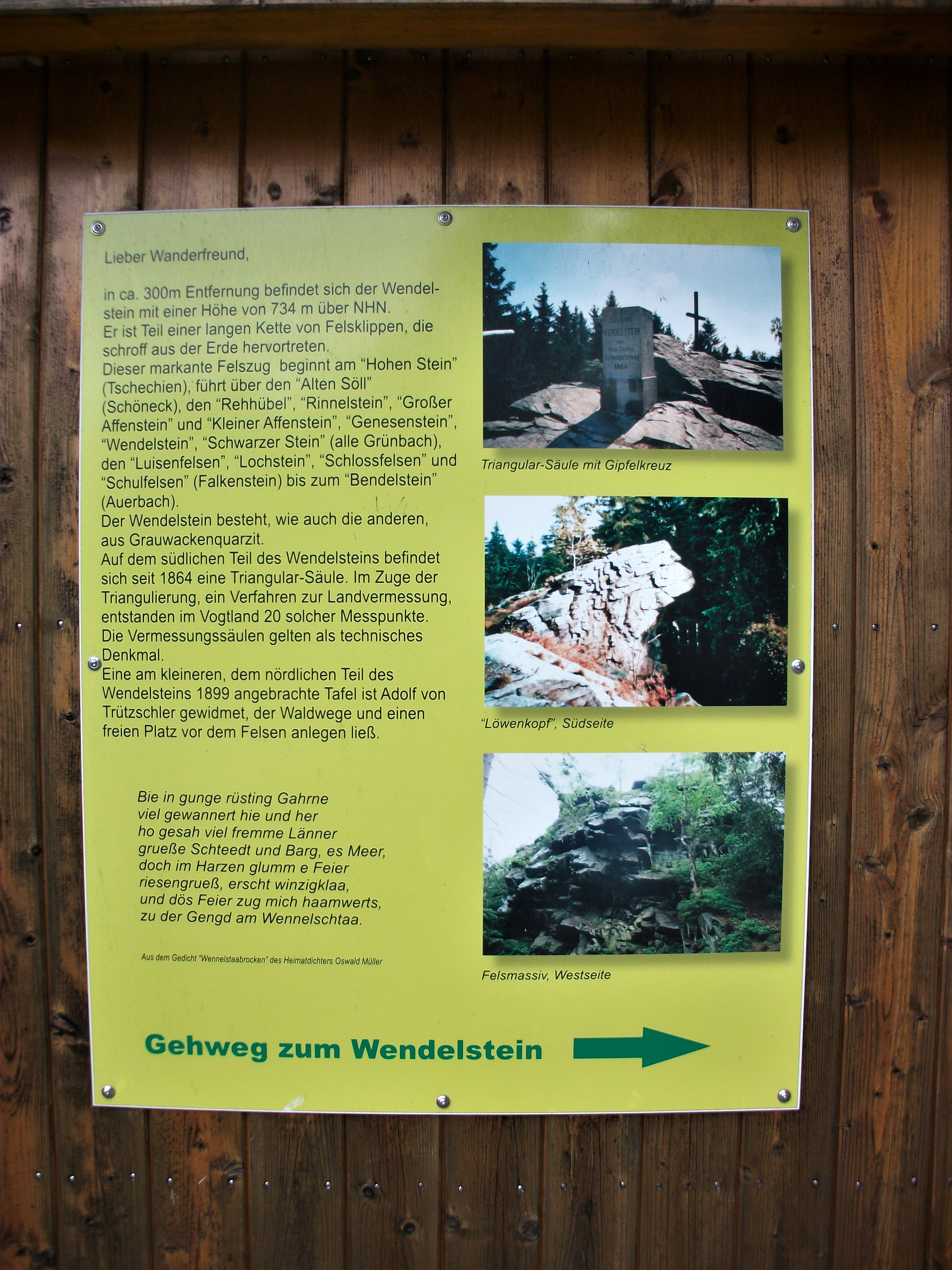
- Wendelstein (Grünbach), information panel with dialect poem (lower part)
- Native to: Germany (Bavaria, Saxony)
- Region: Vogtland
- Native speakers: ~200,000
- Language family: Indo-European: Germanic; West Germanic; Elbe Germanic; Upper German; High Franconian; East Franconian; Upper East Franconian; Vogtlandian
- Early forms: Proto-Indo-European: Proto-Germanic; Proto-West Germanic; Elbe Germanic; Old East Franconian
- Writing system: Latin (German alphabet)

Language codes
- ISO 639-3: –
- Glottolog: vogt1234
- Linguasphere: 52-ACB-djj
- Dialects in the Vogtland region, including the Vogtlandian dialects.

Vogtlandian (German: Vogtländisch [ˈfoːktlɛndɪʃ]; Vogtländisch: Vuuchtländisch, Klingenthal pronunciation: [ˈfuːxtlændɪʃ]) is a dialect spoken in Vogtland. It is related to, but remains distinct from, Erzgebirgisch. It is sometimes classified as an East Franconian sub-dialect.

== Distribution and history ==
Vogtlandian is mainly spoken in rural areas. Speakers are mainly elderly, as school and preschool education tends to be negligent about fostering this linguistic tradition. Furthermore, dialect use is often discouraged from an early age. Just like Lusatia and the Ore Mountains, the Vogtland is one of few areas in Saxony still having regions of comparatively self-contained dialect. Vogtlandian and Erzgebirgisch share some linguistic features, due to similarities and interdependencies in their respective settlement histories.

There are multiple dialects of Vogtland, some of which differ drastically. In Plauen, for instance, a Vogtlandian is spoken completely differently from how it is spoken in Klingenthal. (vogtl. Klengedohl /klenɡədoːl/). A common remark between speakers from neighbouring regions is die singe doch ihre Wördder (engl.: they are singing their words).

The varieties mostly as following:

- Core — or Middle Vogtländisch (in the area around Mühltroff – Treuen – Oelsnitz)
- Northern — or Nether Vogtländisch (along the line Reichenbach – Mylau – Netzschkau – Elsterberg – Pausa)
- Eastern Vogtländisch (in the Göltzschtal area, from Falkenstein – Lengenfeld)
- Upper Vogtländisch (south to the line Bobenneukirchen – Oelsnitz – Werda – Schöneck)

== Vogtlandian proverb ==
Do, wu de Hasn Hoosn haaßen un de Hosen Huusn haaßen, do bi iech dr ham.

Translated literally: "There, where hares are called a pair of pants and a pair of pants are called Husen, that's the place I call home." This proverb is also quite common in neighboring Ore Mountains due to the shift of vowels illustrated through it, which is also a feature of Erzgebirgisch.

== Commonalities and differences ==
Vogtlandian appears as a more than less fluent transition between Meißenisch in the area Chemnitz – Zwickau, Upper East Franconian in the area south to Hof, and South Eastern Thuringian in the area around Gera.

Pre-Vogtländisch is the name for the transitional area to Upper Saxon, which surrounds Reichenbach. Here the originary singing of words is only audible rudimentally, which also holds true for the over-emphasis of intonation within a sentence. Following the Göltzsch upstream, these phenomena will increase strongly.

=== Vogtlandian and Erzgebirgisch ===
See main article Erzgebirgisch

As in the upper and less densely populated areas of the Vogtland everyday Vogtlandian is more in use than in the other distributional areas of the variety, Upper Vogtländisch is commonly perceived to be highly (ab)original and representative for all Vogtlandian varieties. Upper Vogtländisch shows but few differences compared to Western Erzgebirgisch, while diachronic change within the distribution area of Erzgebirgisch seems to be currently occurring. Making a difference between Upper Vogtländisch and Western Erzgebirgisch seems impossible when not having detailed experience or data of their distinctive features.

One shared feature seems to be double negation:

Aufm Bersch liecht kaa Schnee net. (Western Erzgebirgisch)

/ʔaufm beʳʃ liːxt kɑː ʃneː nətʰ/

On the mountain lies no snow not.

=== Vogtlandian and Oberostfränkisch (Upper East Franconian) ===
Also the delineation of Vogtländisch against Oberostfränkisch seems to be rather troublesome, if tried within small-scale regional comparisons. One tendency seems to be the absence of the "rolled R" in Vogtlandian, while distinctive exceptions may still occur.

The area surrounding Hof, also referred to as Bavarian Vogtland, is part of the transitional zone where many originally Vogtlandian features occur, while phonologically Oberostfränkisch seems to be closer.

=== Vogtlandian and Sächsisch (Obersächsisch, Upper Saxon) ===
In addition to Pre-Vogtländisch as a transitional form common features are recognizable on a geographically somewhat larger scale. In similarity to Sächsisch, in Vogtlandian there are almost none but de-labialized vowel sounds and aspiration of consonants is almost completely absent. Especially recipients from southern and western Germany may perceive of the sound of Vogtlandian in a way encouraging the misconception, they would actually hear spoken Sächsisch. Furthermore, ne instead of oder is used as a Question tag at the end of sentences, which is commonly perceived as a typicality of Sächsisch and Saxon use of High German.

Big differences occur in Vogtlandian morphosyntax, giving it features that place it among the East Franconian dialects. Accordingly, many monosyllabic words of Vogtlandian are not intelligible for speakers of Sächsisch, for instance aa /ɑː/ or ae /ɑːᵊ/ (en: also, High German auch /aux/, Sächsisch ooch /oːx/) or the affirmation hoa /haː/ or hae /haᵊ/, which, while it can be used meaning "yes", does not have an equivalent in Standard English or High German, but corresponds with Sächsisch nu /nu/ (in meaning roughly equivalent to aye in Scots).
