= Gerhard Raff =

German historian, editor and publisher

Gerhard Raff (born 13 August 1946 in Stuttgart-Degerloch, then American Zone of Occupation, later West Germany) is a German historian, editor and publisher, well known around Swabia (eastern and southern Baden-Württemberg) for his writings on history in the Swabian dialect of German, e.g. in a weekly column (Raffs Raritäten, i.e. Raff's rarities) for the Stuttgarter Zeitung.

== Life ==
Born shortly after the end of World War II to a farmer and winemaker family on the then rural outskirts of the capital of the former Württemberg (today Baden-Württemberg), Stuttgart, Raff studied history and Protestant Theology at the renowned Eberhard Karls University of Tübingen (the former State University of Württemberg). In 1984, he earned a PhD in history there. His dissertation dealt with the origins of the House of Württemberg, i.e., the ruling dynasty of the state of Württemberg from the Middle Ages until the German Revolution of 1918–1919. That thesis was published in 1988 and thus far has been followed up by two additional volumes on the history of Württemberg in 1993 and 2002, with a fourth one to be published shortly.

Raff donates all revenues and royalties from his lectures and publications to charitable causes, especially, but not exclusively, in the field of preservation of sites of historical interest, e.g. for a pilgrim's hostel on the Way of St. James at La Faba or for the restoration of Ulm Minster.

== List of works ==
Hie gut Wirtemberg allewege I: Das Haus Württemberg von Graf Ulrich dem Stifter bis Herzog Ludwig. Mit einer Einleitung von Hansmartin Decker-Hauff. Stuttgart 1988

Hie gut Wirtemberg allewege II: Das Haus Württemberg von Herzog Friedrich I. bis Herzog Eberhard III. Mit den Linien Stuttgart, Mömpelgard, Weiltingen, Neuenbürg, Neuenstadt am Kocher und Oels in Schlesien, Degerloch 1993

Hie gut Wirtemberg allewege III: Das Haus Württemberg von Herzog Wilhelm Ludwig bis Herzog Friedrich Karl. Mit den Linien Stuttgart, Winnental, Neuenstadt am Kocher, Neuenbürg, Mömpelgard und Oels, Bernstadt und Juliusburg in Schlesien und Weiltingen. Degerloch 2002

Chronik der Stadt Stuttgart 1954–1960 (Stuttgart City Chronicle)

Herr, schmeiß Hirn ra!, 1985

Mehr Hirn!, 1995, mit Illustrationen von Loriot

Raffs Raritäten, 1998

Die schwäbische Geschichte, 2000 (Swabian History)

Eiserne Ration für furchtlose und treue Württemberger, 2003
