= Eberhard Wagner =

German linguist and author (born 1938)

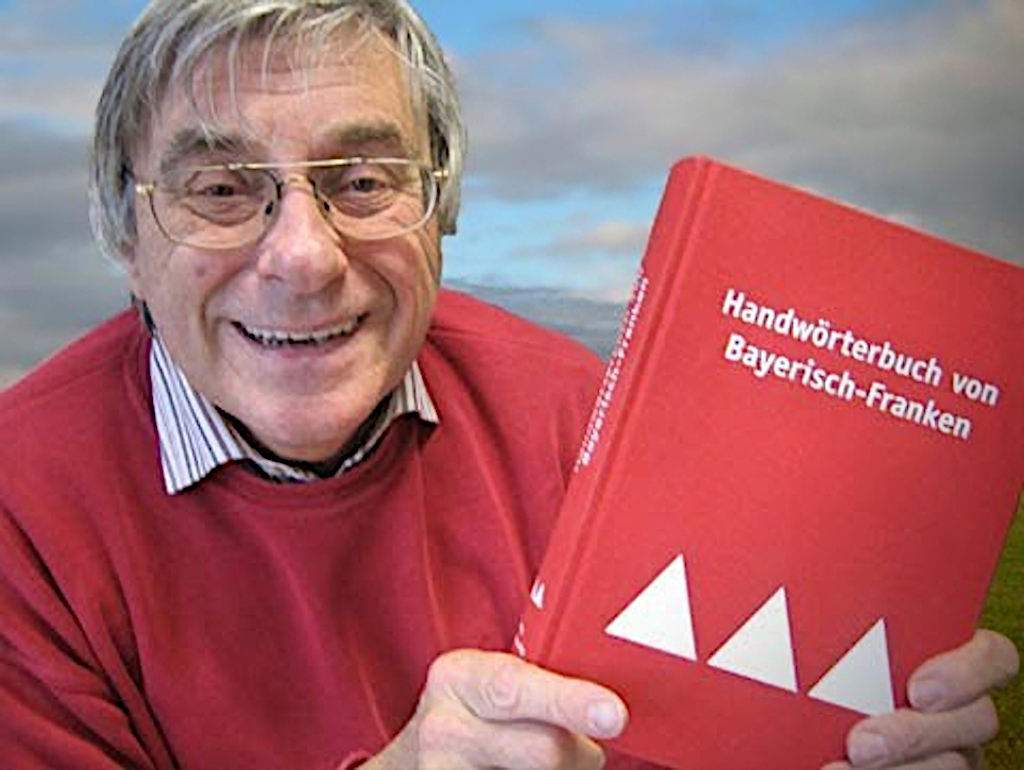
- Born: January 4, 1938 (age 88); Weimar, Germany
- Education: University of Cologne and Erlangen-Nuremberg
- Occupations: German regional dialect researcher, poet, playwright and actor
- Years active: 36
- Employer(s): Bavarian Academy of Sciences and Humanities
- Known for: writing and publishing in the dialect of Upper Franconia
- Notable work: Das fränkische Dialektbuch

Eberhard Wagner (born January 4, 1938, in Weimar) is a German regional dialect researcher, poet, playwright, and actor who focuses on local dialects. He is well-known for writing and publishing in the dialect of Upper Franconia (East Franconian German).

== Life and education ==
Wagner is the son of a publishing manager who owned books by Goethe and worked for the Brockhaus publishing company. This early exposure sparked Eberhard's interest in language from a young age.

After the family fled from Weimar to Gottsfeld in Upper Franconia due to World War II, Eberhard Wagner attended the local elementary school there. In 1958, he graduated from the German Gymnasium in Bayreuth.

After that, he studied German language and literature, history, and dialectology at the universities of Cologne and Erlangen-Nuremberg. He completed his doctoral studies in 1964 (Ph.D.) with a dissertation on the dialects of the southern Bayreuth region (die Dialekte des südlichen Bayreuther Raumes).

Eberhard Wagner lives in Bayreuth.

== Career ==
In 1967, the trained dialect researcher began his career at the Bavarian Academy of Sciences and Humanities, initially in Erlangen as an editor. From 1993 until his retirement in 2003, he served as the head of the East Franconian Dictionary Project in Bayreuth. During his 36 years of involvement in this project, he was known for designing questionnaires and actively engaging with the public, which enabled the publication of the Bavarian-Franconian Hand Dictionary in 2005 (Ostfränkisches Wörterbuch). Wagner continued to contribute to this work even after retiring.

Alongside his academic work, Wagner also pursued dialect poetry and wrote plays for the Studiobühne Bayreuth, which he co-founded. For over 20 years, he hosted the radio show "Die Mundartshow" on Radio Mainwelle and created radio plays for Bayerischer Rundfunk. In 1986, Wagner appeared as an actor in the film "Der Flieger" and also performed as a cabaret artist in Franconian theaters and cultural centers. His repertoire included humorous texts and poems in Franconian dialect.

== Awards ==
In 2008, Eberhard Wagner was awarded the Order of Merit of the Federal Republic of Germany for his contributions to the research and preservation of the Franconian dialect.

In 2010, the city of Bayreuth honored the dialect poet, language researcher, and actor with the Cultural Award.

In 2016, he received the "Frankenwürfel," an award given to individuals who have made significant contributions to Franconian culture.

== Bibliography ==
- Wagner, Eberhard; Rascher, Reinhard (1987). Das fränkische Dialektbuch. München: Beck. ISBN 978-3-406-31800-9.
- Bayerische Akademie der Wissenschaften, ed. (2007). Handwörterbuch von Bayerisch-Franken. Bamberg: Verl. Fränkischer Tag. ISBN 978-3-936897-52-4.
- Wagner, Eberhard (1998). Anawengsawengwos: Gedichte in oberfränkischer Mundart. Bamberg: Verl. Fränkischer Tag. ISBN 978-3-928648-33-2.
