= South Franconian German =

Upper German dialect

South Franconian
- South Rhine Franconian
- Südfränkisch; Südrheinfränkisch
- Native to: Germany (Baden-Württemberg)
- Language family: Indo-European: Germanic; West Germanic; Elbe Germanic; High German; Upper German / Central German; High Franconian; South Franconian
- Early forms: Proto-Indo-European: Proto-Germanic; Frankish; Old High Franconian; Old South-Rhine Franconian
- Writing system: Latin (German alphabet)

Language codes
- ISO 639-3: –

South Franconian (German: Südfränkisch) or South Rhine Franconian (German: Südrheinfränkisch) is an Upper German dialect which is spoken in the northernmost part of Baden-Württemberg in Germany, around Karlsruhe, Mosbach and Heilbronn. Like closely related East Franconian, it is a transitional dialect, which unites elements of Central German and Upper German.

The language area is located in the transient zone between Rhine Franconian dialects (Hessian and Palatinate German) in the north and Alemannic German (Low Alemannic and Swabian German) in the south. South Franconian is one of the High German dialects with the lowest number of speakers. South Franconian is not considered a separate dialect by some observers. The scope of South Franconian is disputed.
