= Franconian (linguistics) =

Term referring to several West Germanic varieties

Franconian or Frankish is a collective term traditionally used by linguists to refer to many West Germanic languages, some of which are spoken in what formed the historical core area of Francia during the Early Middle Ages.

Linguistically, it has no common typological features for all the various dialects conventionally grouped as Franconian. As such, it forms a residual category within the larger historical West Germanic dialect continuum and not a homogeneous group of closely related dialects. For most of the varieties grouped under the term "Franconian", the diachronical connection to the Frankish language, which was spoken by the Franks, is unclear.

The High German consonant shift divides the varieties with the epithet Franconian, as the Low Franconian languages (including Dutch and Afrikaans) did not participate in this shift whereas the Central Franconian languages (which includes Luxembourgish) did, to varying degrees.

Both the term Franconian and its further delineations are restricted in their use to linguists and are not used as an endonym by any speakers of the Franconian group except for East Franconian.

== Terminology ==
The term Frankish or Franconian (Standard High German: Fränkisch, Dutch: Frankisch) as a modern linguistic category was used by the German linguist Wilhelm Braune (1850–1926) to designate historical West Germanic texts which he could not readily classify as belonging to either Low Saxon, Alemannic or Bavarian.

The practice of alluding to tribal names from the Migration Period when naming dialect groups during the early stages of Germanic Philology was not restricted to Germany: 19th-century Dutch linguists also conventionally divided the Germanic varieties spoken in the Netherlands and Belgium into Frisian, Saxon, and Frankish varieties. In both cases, linguistic borders of historical ancestor dialects were, at the time, thought to closely mirror the supposed tribal duchies of the Frankish Empire at the start of the Early Middle Ages.

Earlier use of "Franconian/Frankish" as a linguistic category can be found. For example, Dutch linguist Jan van Vliet (1622–1666) used Francica or Francks. According to van Vliet, Franconian descended from oud Teuts (ancient German[ic]). Similarly, the scholar Franciscus Junius was said by Jo(h)annes Georgius Graevius in 1694 to have collected fragments of the old Frankish and other languages for the elucidation of the mother tongue ("[...] ad illustrandam linguam patriam [...] ex lingua vetere Francica, Saxonica, Gothica, Cimbrica, Frisi[c]a, [...]").

=== Definition ===
The term "Franconian" refers to a collection of dialects, and not to a language. While a descriptive definition of Franconian as a whole does not exist, its internal subdivisions can be defined and contrasted, both with one another and other large dialect groupings.

== Divisions of Franconian ==
=== Low Franconian ===
Low Franconian, Low Frankish, or Netherlandic is a linguistic category used to classify many historical and contemporary West Germanic varieties closely related to, and including, the Dutch language (or Netherlandish). Most dialects and languages included within the category are spoken in the Netherlands, northern Belgium (Flanders), in the Nord department of France, in western Germany (Lower Rhine), as well as in Suriname, South Africa, and Namibia.

=== Middle or Central Franconian ===
The Central Franconian dialects are spoken in the German states of South-Western North Rhine-Westphalia, most of Rhineland-Palatinate, Saarland, the bordering French Moselle department, and in Luxembourg, as well as by the Transylvanian Saxons in Romania.

=== Rhine Franconian ===
The Rhine Franconian dialects are spoken in the German states of Rhineland-Palatinate, Saarland, northern Baden-Württemberg, southern Hesse, northern Bavaria, in the bordering French Moselle department, as well as by the Pennsylvania Dutch in North America.

=== East Franconian ===
The East Franconian dialects are transitional dialects between Central- and Upper German.

The East Franconian dialect branch is one of the most spoken dialect branches in Germany. These dialects are mainly spoken in the region of Franconia. Franconia consists of the Bavarian districts of Upper-, Middle-, and Lower Franconia, the region of South Thuringia (Thuringia), and the eastern parts of the region of Heilbronn-Franken (Tauber Franconia and Hohenlohe) in Baden-Württemberg. The easternmost Franconian-speaking areas are the Saxon parts of Vogtland, in whose central parts East Franconian (Core Vogtlandian), and in whose eastern parts transitional dialects (North Vogtlandian and Southeast Vogtlandian) are spoken. The East Franconian dialects are the only Franconian dialects that are referred to as "Franconian" by their speakers. It is called Fränkisch (Standard High German) or Fränggisch (East Franconian) by its speakers, though this is due to the region of Franconia where the dialect is spoken. Only the speakers in Saxon Vogtland refer to their dialects as "Vogtlandian" rather than "Franconian". The largest cities in the East Franconian dialect area are Nuremberg and Würzburg.

=== South Franconian ===
South Franconian is mainly spoken in northern Baden-Württemberg in Germany, but also in the northeasternmost part of the region of Alsace in France. While these dialects are considered as dialects of German in Baden-Württemberg, they are considered as dialects of Alsatian in Alsace (the other dialects in Alsace are either Alemannic or Rhine Franconian). The South Franconian dialects are colloquially referred to by their speakers as "Badian" in the Badian parts, and as "Unterländisch" (the Unterland being the region around Heilbronn) or "Swabian" (because of strong influences from the capital Stuttgart, where Swabian dialects are spoken) in the Württembergian parts of Baden-Württemberg. The largest cities in the South Franconian dialect area are Karlsruhe and Heilbronn.

== See also ==
- Old Frankish
- East Central German

== Bibliography ==
- Dekker, Kees (1999). The origins of Old Germanic studies in the Low Countries. Brill's Studies in Intellectual History. Vol. 92. Leiden / Boston / Köln: Brill.
- Feulner, Hans-Jürgen; Wunder, Bernhard; Bittruf, Doris; Grebner, Stefan (1997). Wie såchd denn Ihr dezu?: Ein fränkisches Mundart-Wörterbuch für den Landkreis Kronach. Schirmer Druck, Mitwitz. ISBN 3-9803467-3-0.
- Munske, Horst Haider; Hinderling, Robert (1996). "Linguistic Atlas of Bavaria-Swabia", "Linguistic Atlas of Middle Franconia", "Linguistic Atlas of Lower Franconia", "Linguistic Atlas of North East Bavaria", "Linguistic Atlas of Lower and Upper Bavaria". Bavarian Linguistic Atlas. Heidelberg: University Press. ISBN 3-8260-1865-6.
- Munske, Horst Haider; Klepsch, Alfred (2004) [2003]. Linguistic Atlas of Middle Franconia. Heidelberg: University Press.
- van der Horst, J. M. (2002). Introduction to Old Dutch. University Press, Leuven.
- Wells, Chris (1985). German: A Linguistic History to 1945. Oxford: Clarendon Press.
