= Colonia Tovar dialect =

Alemannic dialect

Colonia Tovar
- Alemán Coloniero
- Native to: Venezuela
- Native speakers: 1,500 (2009)
- Language family: Indo-European: Germanic; West Germanic; Irminonic; High German; Upper German; Alemannic; Low Alemannic; Colonia Tovar

Language codes
- ISO 639-3: gct
- Glottolog: colo1254
- IETF: gct

The Colonia Tovar dialect, or Alemán Coloniero, is a dialect that is spoken in Colonia Tovar, Venezuela, and belongs to the Low Alemannic branch of German.

== Characteristics ==
The dialect, like other Alemannic dialects, is not mutually intelligible with Standard German. It is spoken by descendants of Germans from the Black Forest region of southern Baden, who emigrated to Venezuela in 1843. Most speakers also speak Spanish, and the dialect has both acquired Spanish loanwords and influenced Venezuelan Spanish.

== History ==
Until 1942, when Colonia Tovar was declared a municipality, most of its residents above the age of 15 were fluent in German, being unable to converse or understand Spanish, owing to the town's isolation. In World War II, Venezuela declared war on Germany, and so German classes in Colonia Tovar were banned. The town became connected with the rest of the country and so people began to converse in Spanish, which has led to the dialect's decline.

Despite attempts to use German as the language of instruction, the state has not given local schools permission to teach in bilingual classes, and so, only private tutors were allowed to instruct in the Colonia Tovar dialect and in Standard German. Most descendants of German settlers in Colonia Tovar now mostly speak Standard German.

== Literature ==
- Blanco Hernández, Marlene: Introducción al analisis gramatical del Aleman de la Colonia Tovar. Universidad Central de Venezuela. Caracas 1987.
- Redlich Perkins, Renate: Tovar German. Linguistic study of a German century alemannic dialect spoken in Venezuela. University Microfilms International. Ann Arbor, Michigan, London 1978.
- Da Rin, Denise: Die deutsche Sprache in der Colonia Tovar (Venezuela) - Eine soziolinguistische Untersuchung. München 1995.
- Kanzler, Samuel Briceño: La Colonia Tovar y su gente. Tovar, o. J. (Title in German translation: Die Colonia Tovar und ihre Menschen).
