= Northern Bavarian =

Dialect of Bavarian German

- Nordboarisch
- Native to: Germany
- Region: Upper Palatinate, Upper Franconia, Upper Bavaria, Lower Bavaria
- Language family: Indo-European: Germanic; West Germanic; High German; Upper German; Bavarian; Northern Bavarian
- Writing system: Latin (German alphabet), historically the Gothic script

Language codes
- ISO 639-3: –
- Glottolog: nort2634
- Areas of Northern Bavarian after 1945 and the expulsions of the Germans.

Northern Bavarian is a dialect of Bavarian, together with Central Bavarian and Southern Bavarian. Bavarian is mostly spoken in the Upper Palatinate, although not in Regensburg, which is a primarily Central Bavarian–speaking area, according to a linguistic survey done in the late 1980s. According to the same survey, Northern Bavarian is also spoken in Upper Franconia, as well as in some areas in Upper and Lower Bavaria, such as in the areas around Eichstätt and Kelheim. Few speakers remained in the Czech Republic, mostly concentrated around Aš and Železná Ruda, at the time of the survey, but considering the time which has passed since the survey, the dialect may be extinct in those places today. If it still exists there, it would include the ostegerländische Dialektgruppe. Ethnologue estimates that there were 9,000 speakers of Bavarian in the Czech Republic in 2005, but does not clarify if these were Northern Bavarian speakers.

According to the same linguistic survey, the dialect is flourishing in the areas where it is spoken, despite the fact that most speakers actively use Standard German. In the south of the area where Northern Bavarian is spoken, Central Bavarian is said to have higher prestige, and Northern Bavarian characteristics are therefore not as visible as in the north, where speakers even tend to use a heavy Northern Bavarian accent when speaking German.

== Phonology ==
=== Vowels ===
Northern Bavarian has 8 vowels:

	Front	Back	
	Unrounded	Unrounded	Rounded
Close	i		u
Close-mid	e		o
Open-mid	ɛ		ɔ
Open	a	ɑ	

And 11 diphthongs:

Ending with /i/	Ending with /u/	Ending with /ə/
ɛi̯	ɔu̯	eə̯
ei̯	ou̯	iə̯
ai̯	au̯	uə̯
oi̯		oə̯

Before /l/, /i, e, ɛ/ are rounded to [ʏ, ø, œ].

In southern varieties of Northern Bavarian the diphthongs /iə̯, uə̯/ are realized with an opener offset, i.e. [iɐ̯, uɐ̯].

An interesting aspect of the diphthongs are the so-called reversed diphthongs, or in German, gestürzte Diphthonge. They are called so because the Middle High German diphthongs [ie̯, ye̯, uo̯] became [ei̯, ou̯] ([y] became [i] after unrounding) in Northern Bavarian, while they generally became [iː, yː, uː] in Standard German. Compare Standard German Brief [briːf], Bruder [ˈbruːdɐ], Brüder [ˈbryːdɐ] and Northern Bavarian [ˈb̥rei̯v̥], [ˈb̥rou̯d̥ɐ], [ˈb̥rei̯d̥ɐ].

The Northern Bavarian diphthong [ɔu̯] corresponds to the Middle High German and Standard German [oː, aː]. Compare Standard German Schaf [ʃaːf], Stroh [ʃtroː] and Northern Bavarian [ʒ̊ɔu̯v̥], [ʒ̊d̥rɔu̯]. Likewise, the Northern Bavarian diphthong [ɛi̯] corresponds to the Middle High German and Standard German [eː] and by unrounding to [øː]. Compare Standard German Schnee [ʃneː], böse [ˈbøːzə] with Northern Bavarian [ʒ̊n̥ɛi̯], [b̥ɛi̯z̥].

In many Northern Bavarian variants, nasalization is increasingly common.

=== Consonants ===
Northern Bavarian has about 33 consonants:

	Bilabial		Labiodental		Alveolar		Postalveolar		Palatal		Velar		Glottal
Plosive	p	b̥			t	d̥					k	ɡ̊	
Nasal		m				n						ŋ	
Fricative	β, β̬		f	v̥	s	z̥	ʃ	ʒ̊	ç	ʝ	x	ɣ̊	h
Affricate	p͡f	b̥͡v̥			t͡s	d̥͡z̥	t͡ʃ	d̥͡ʒ̥			k͡x		
Trill						r							
Approximant						l, lʲ				j			

/r/ is realized as either [ɐ] or [ə] when occurring postvocally.

/lʲ/ may be syllabic, as in Northern Bavarian [ml̩ʲ]; compare Standard German Mühle.

== Grammar ==
=== Nouns ===
==== Gender ====
All nouns in Northern Bavarian have one of three genders: feminine, masculine and neuter. Many nouns have the same gender as in Standard German, but there are many exceptions. An example is Benzin, which is neuter in Standard German, but masculine in Northern Bavarian. Another example is Butter, which is feminine in Standard German, but it can be all three genders in Northern Bavarian depending on your location and local variation of the dialect.

==== Case ====
As in Standard German there are four cases in Northern Bavarian: nominative, accusative, genitive and dative. The genitive case, however, is uncommon and is commonly replaced either with the dative and a possessive pronoun or with the preposition von [v̥ə, v̥ən, v̥əm] and the dative, e.g. [m̩̩ v̥ɑtɐ z̥ãi haːu̯z̥], or [s̩ haːu̯z̥ v̥om v̥ɑtɐ] father's house. An exception is the genitive instead of the dative after the singular possessive pronouns, e.g. [hintɐ mai̯nɐ], which is as correct as [hintɐ miɐ̯] behind me. Prepositions take the dative or the accusative, but not the genitive, e.g. [d̥rots n̩ reːŋ] (formally [d̥rots m̩ reːŋ]) despite the rain. The dative ending -m often sounds like the accusative ending -n (see the previous example), so that these two cases are not distinguishable.

==== Inflection ====
Nouns in Northern Bavarian are inflected for number, and to a lesser extent, case. Inflecting for number is common across all three genders, and especially umlaut is productive, in particular in masculine nouns. The most common plural marker in feminine nouns is [n], while it is [ɐ] with most neuter nouns. Many nouns, across the genders, are the same in the plural as in the singular.

English head, Standard German Kopf, Northern Bavarian sg. m. [kʰoːb̥͡v] > pl. [kʰep͡f]
English cat, Standard German Katze, Northern Bavarian sg. f. [kʰɑt͡s] > pl. [kʰɑt͡sn̩]
English house, Standard German Haus, Northern Bavarian sg. n. [haːu̯z̥] > pl. [haːi̯z̥ɐ]

Weak masculine nouns are inflected in the accusative and dative case, most commonly with suffixation of a nasal consonant, such as [m] or [n], while the other cases remain uninflected. Many weak feminine nouns have the ending [n] in most cases, though not to be confused with the plural ending. Weak neuter nouns have almost been lost, with only strong remaining, and therefore inflection for case is basically nonexistent.

English boy, Standard German Bube, Northern Bavarian m. nom. [dɐ bou̯] > m. acc./dat. [n̩ bou̯m]

=== Adjectives ===
The inflection of adjectives in Northern Bavarian differ depending on whether the adjective is preceded by a definite article or a demonstrative, or if it is preceded by an indefinite article or a possessive, or if it is used as a predicate, of which the latter is only present in some varieties. Adjectives without any determiner rarely occur.

Below can the inflectional paradigms be seen, with the adjective [ɔːld̥] serving as an example. This is also the form used in all situations, when the adjective is used as a predicate, and therefore no paradigm is needed. Compare Northern Bavarian [ɔːld̥] with the Standard German alt, in English old.

	Precedence of a definite article, or a demonstrative					
	Singular			Plural		
	Masculine	Feminine	Neuter	Masculine	Feminine	Neuter
Nominative	[d̥ɐ ɔlt]	[d̥ei̯ ɔlt]	[s ɔlt]	[d̥ei̯ ɔltn̩]		[d̥ei̯ɐ ɔltn̩]
Accusative	[n̩ ɔltn̩]	[d̥ei̯ ɔlt]	[s ɔlt]	[d̥ei̯ ɔltn̩]		[d̥ei̯ɐ ɔltn̩]
Dative	[n̩ ɔltn̩]	[d̥ɐr(ɐ) ɔltn̩]	[n̩ ɔltn̩]	[(ɐ)n ɔltn̩]		[d̥ei̯ɐ ɔltn̩]

	Precedence of an indefinite article, or a possessive					
	Singular			Plural		
	Masculine	Feminine	Neuter	Masculine	Feminine	Neuter
Nominative	[ɐ ɔltɐ]	[ɐ ɔltɐ]	[ɐ ɔlts]	[ɔlt]		[ɔltɐ]
Accusative	[ɐn ɔltn̩]	[ɐ ɔltɐ]	[ɐ ɔlts]	[ɔlt]		[ɔltɐ]
Dative	[ɐn ɔltn̩]	[ɐrɐ ɔltn̩]	[ɐn ɔltn̩]	[ɔltn̩]		[ɔltɐ]

The predicate form of an adjective differ from the other forms, not only because it is the basic form, but also because it has a long vowel, unlike the other forms, as in [ɔːld̥] above. Other examples include [ɡ̊rɔːu̯z̥] and [b̥rɔːɐ̯d̥], which become [ɡ̊rou̯s] and [b̥roi̯t], respectively. Compare with the Standard German gross and breit, in English big and broad.

Comparative adjectives are formed by suffixing [ɐ], and superlative adjectives are formed by suffixing [st]. Vowel changes often take place when the suffixation happens. An example is [hɔːu̯ɣ̊], which becomes [ˈhɛi̯xɐ] when comparative and [ˈhɛi̯kst] when superlative. Compare with the Standard German hoch, höher and höchsten, in English high, higher and highest.

=== Pronouns ===
The pronouns of Northern Bavarian differ slightly from variety to variety. Furthermore, there are two pairs of pronouns, one used when in stressed position and the other used when unstressed.

	Singular, Stressed					
	First person	Second person		Third person		
	First person	Informal	Formal	Masculine	Feminine	Neuter
Nominative	[iː(j)]	[d̥uː]	[z̥iː]	[eɐ]	[z̥iː]	-
Accusative	[miː(j)]	[d̥iː(j)]	[eɐ̃nɐ]	[eɐ̃m]	[z̥iː]	-
Dative	[miɐ]	[d̥iɐ]	[eɐ̃nɐ]	[eɐ̃m]	[iɐ]	-

	Singular, Unstressed					
	First person	Second person		Third person		
	First person	Informal	Formal	Masculine	Feminine	Neuter
Nominative	[e]	-	[z̥]	[ɐ]	[z̥], [s]	
Accusative	[me]	[d̥e]	[z̥]	[n(ɐ)]	[z̥], [s]	
Dative	[mɐ]	[d̥ɐ]	-	[n(ɐ)]	[ɐrɐ]	[n(ɐ)]

	Plural, Stressed		
	First person	Second person	Third person
Nominative	[miɐ]	[d̥iɐts], [eŋk(s)]	-
Accusative	[unz̥]	[eŋk(s)], [aiç]	-
Dative	[unz̥]	[eŋk(s)], [aiç]	[eɐ̃nɐ]

	Plural, Unstressed		
	First person	Second person	Third person
Nominative	[mɐ]	[s]	[z̥], [s]
Accusative	-		[z̥], [s]
Dative	-		[nɐ]

There is no gender distinction in the plural.

The ending [j] in the stressed first person singular nominative and -accusative and in stressed the second person singular accusative is only present in northern- and western varieties of Northern Bavarian.

At the time of a linguistic survey carried out in the late 1980s, pronouns also existed for unstressed first person plural accusative and unstressed second person plural accusative, [iz] and [iç], respectively, but they have probably fallen out of usage today.

=== Verbs ===
Verbs in Northern Bavarian are conjugated for person, tense and mood. The Northern Bavarian verbs are also subject to both vowel change and apophony.

==== Non-finite forms ====
The non-finite forms have one three endings: [∅], [n] and [ɐ]. The first ending is rare, and is only present in some few monosyllabic verbs, such as [za͡i], Standard German sein, English to be; [ɡ̊ɛi], Standard German gehen, English to go; [ʒ̊d̥ɛi], Standard German stehen, English to stand; and [d̥o͡u], Standard German tun, English to do. The second ending is the most common ending found on most verbs, such as [b̥itn̩], Standard German bitten, English to ask. The third ending is used with verbs having a certain stem-final consonant, such as [z̥iŋɐ], Standard German singen, English to sing.

==== Present tense ====
The personal endings for the present tense differ slightly from variety to variety, but are largely uniform. The endings in the scheme below are attached to the stem, and not the non-finite form. The stem is found by removing the non-finite ending, if it is [n] or [ɐ].

	Singular	Plural
First person	-Ø	nf.
Second person	-[z̥d̥]	-[t͡s]
Third person	-[d̥]	nf.

As can be seen in the scheme above, the first person singular is basically the same as the stem, and the first- and third persons plural are the same as the non-finite form. Furthermore, the third person singular is realized as -[d̥] when occurring before a fortis obstruent, and that in some southern varieties of Northern Bavarian the first person plural has the ending -[mɐ], and therefore isn't the non-finite form.

The singular imperative is the same as the first person singular, and the plural imperative is the same as the second person plural. Only one exception exists, which is the imperative of [z̥a͡i], Standard German sein, English to be, which is [b̥iː].

==== Past tense ====
Only one verb with a distinct simple past tense form remains, [z̥ai̯], Standard German sein, English to be, with the simple past tense form [βoə̯], Standard German war, English was. The past tense of other verbs is formed in the same way as Standard German uses haben or sein, English to have and to be, respectively, and the past participle.

The past participle in Northern Bavarian is formed by the prefix [ɡ̊]-, although not on verbs beginning with a plosive consonant, where the prefix is left out. Thus we see [ɡ̊ʒ̊it], Standard German geschüttet, English shaken; [ɡ̊numɐ], Standard German genommen, English taken; [b̥rɑxd̥], Standard German gebracht, English brought; and [d̥roŋ], Standard German getragen, English carried.

The verbs [hɔm] and [z̥ai̯], Standard German haben and sein, English to have and to be, can be seen conjugated in the scheme below in the present, as they are irregular. They have the past participles, [ɡ̊hɔt] and [ɡ̊βeːn], respectively. Compare with Standard German gehaben and gewesen, English had and been.

[hɔm]
	Singular	Plural
First person	[hoː]	[hɔm]
Second person	[hɔu̯z̥d̥]	[hɔu̯t͡s]
Third person	[hɔu̯d̥]	[hɔm]

[z̥ai̯]
	Singular	Plural
First person	[b̥in]	[z̥an, han]
Second person	[b̥iːz̥d̥]	[z̥at͡s, hat͡s]
Third person	[iːz̥]	[z̥an, han]

Examples can be seen below:

- [iː hoː ɡ̊ʒ̊it], Standard German Ich habe geschüttet, English I have poured
- [eɐ̯ hɔu̯d̥ b̥rɑxd̥], Standard German Er hat gebracht, English He has brought

==== Subjunctive ====
It is quite straightforward to form the subjunctive in Northern Bavarian. The subjunctive of verbs is formed with the suffix -[ɐd̥], as in [βisn̩] > [βisɐd̥], Standard German wissen > wüßte, English to know > I would know.

==== Apophony ====
Both weak verbs and strong verbs may undergo apophony. The strong verbs can be split into two groups: the first group where the vowel in the non-finite form is the same as in the past participle; and the second group where the vowel in the non-finite form is different from the vowel in the past participle. The most common vowel gradations in the second group can be seen below:

- [ai̯] > [i(ː)]: [ʒ̊nai̯n] > [ɡ̊ʒ̊niːn], Standard German schneiden > geschnitten - English to cut
- [ei̯] > [o], [uɐ̯]: [b̥ei̯n] > [b̥uɐ̯n], Standard German bieten > geboten - English to offer
- [i] > [u]: [ziŋɐ] > [ɡ̊z̥uŋɐ], Standard German singen > gesungen - English to sing
- [ɛ] > [o]: [d̥rɛʃn̩] > [d̥roʃn̩], Standard German dreschen > gedroschen - English to thresh

Apophony is not as common with weak verbs as in Standard German. However, the number of weak verbs with morphophonological variations is high, especially change in vowel length is common.

== Example ==
This is a phonetic transcription of a text in Northern Bavarian, with translations in German and English.

Northern Bavarian	German	English
ɪç bɪn ɪn ʒdoːᵈl ɡɔŋə, ᶷn do βoən daːm drɪnə, ᶷn dao ɪz uəm və də mlʲ aː ɪz uəm troi̯t aːvɡʒit kβeːzd...	Ich bin in den Stadel gegangen, und da waren Tauben drinnen, und da ist oben von der Mühle auch ist oben Getreide aufgeschüttet gewesen...	I went into the barn, and there were pigeons in it, and then, upstairs, there was grain heaped up as well, from the mill...
