= Bockstadt =

- Ortsteil of Eisfeld
- Interactive map of Bockstadt
- Location within Germany Location within Thuringia
- Coordinates: 50°23′N 10°52′E
- Country: Germany
- State: Thuringia
- District: Hildburghausen
- Town: Eisfeld

Area
  - Total: 5.80 km^{2} (2.24 sq mi)
- Elevation: 425 m (1,394 ft)

Population (2012-12-31)
  - Total: 292
  - Density: 50.3/km^{2} (130/sq mi)
- Time zone: UTC+01:00 (CET)
  - Summer (DST): UTC+02:00 (CEST)
- Postal codes: 98673
- Dialling codes: 03686
- Vehicle registration: HBN
- Website: www.bockstadt.com

Bockstadt is a village and a former municipality in the district of Hildburghausen, in Thuringia, Germany. Since 31 December 2013, it is part of the town Eisfeld.
