= High Franconian German =

Dialect

High Franconian
- Upper Franconian; German: Oberfränkisch
- Geographic distribution: Bavaria, Baden-Württemberg, Thuringia, Saxony
- Linguistic classification: Indo-European: Germanic; West Germanic languages; Weser-Rhine Germanic / Elbe Germanic; High German languages; Upper German; High Franconian
- Subdivisions: East Franconian; South Franconian

Language codes
- Glottolog: uppe1464 Upper Franconian
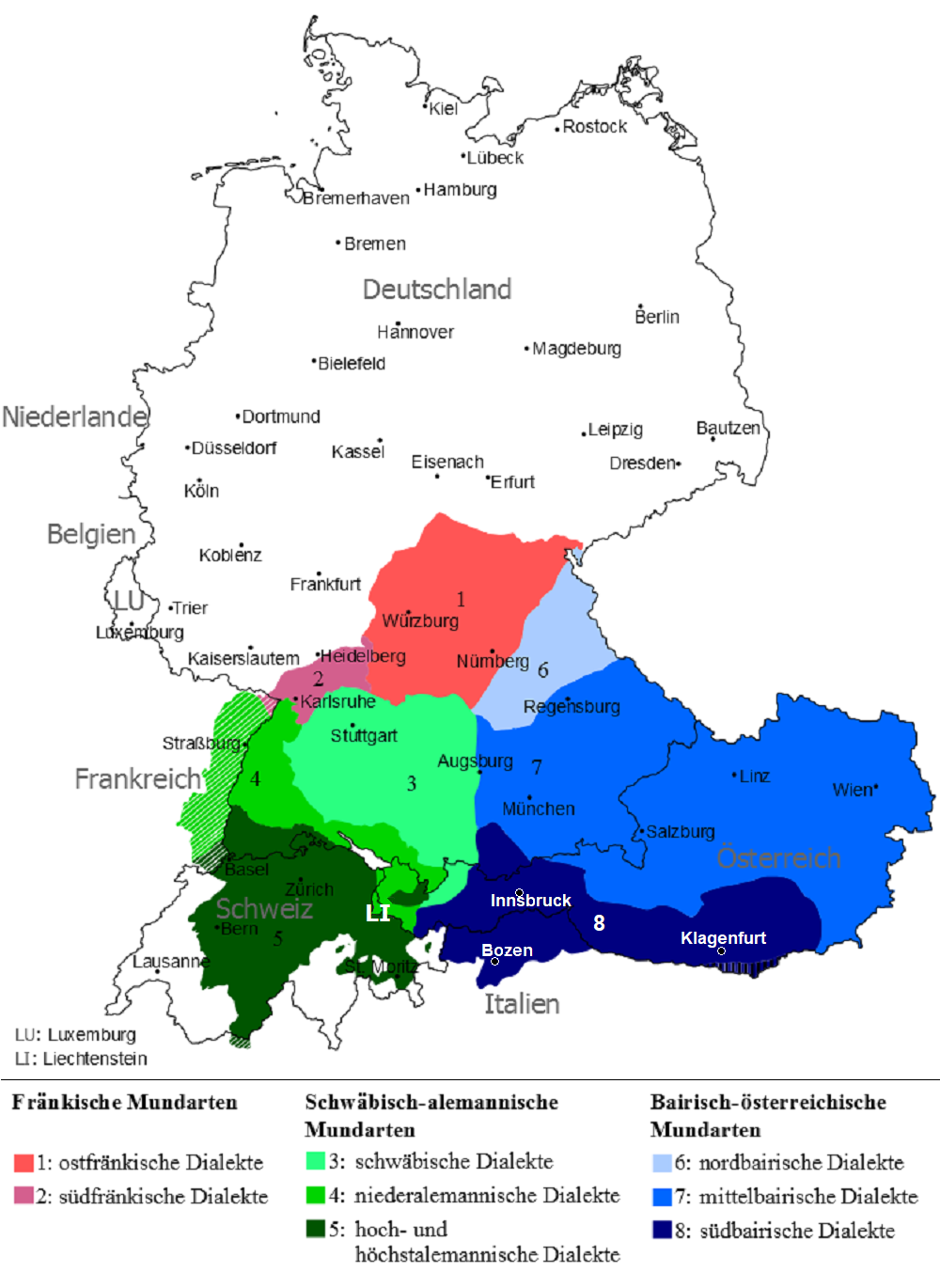
- Upper German dialects after 1945 1: East Franconian 2: South Franconian

High Franconian or Upper Franconian (German: Oberfränkisch) is a part of High German consisting of East Franconian and South Franconian. It is spoken southeast of the Rhine Franconian area. It is spoken in Germany around Karlsruhe, Nuremberg, Erlangen, Fürth, Bamberg, Heilbronn, Meiningen and Würzburg and a small area in France.

High Franconian is transitional between Upper German and Central German but usually regarded as Upper German. It is disputed whether it makes sense to summarise East and South Franconian because both are different.

== See also ==
- Franconian languages
