= Upper German =

Family of High German languages

- Oberdeutsch
- Geographic distribution: Southern Germany, northern and central Switzerland, Austria, Liechtenstein, Northern Italy (South Tyrol), France (Alsace), Argentina, Chile, Venezuela (Colonia Tovar: Alemán Coloniero)
- Linguistic classification: Indo-European: Germanic; West Germanic; Elbe Germanic; High German; Upper German
- Early form: since the New High German time: Old High German and Middle High German
- Subdivisions: Alemannic; Bavarian; East Franconian (Note: Since the Middle High German period; in the Old High German period, it was closer to Central German)); South Franconian (Note: Sometimes included; sometimes classified as Central German)); Lombardic †

Language codes
- Glottolog: high1286
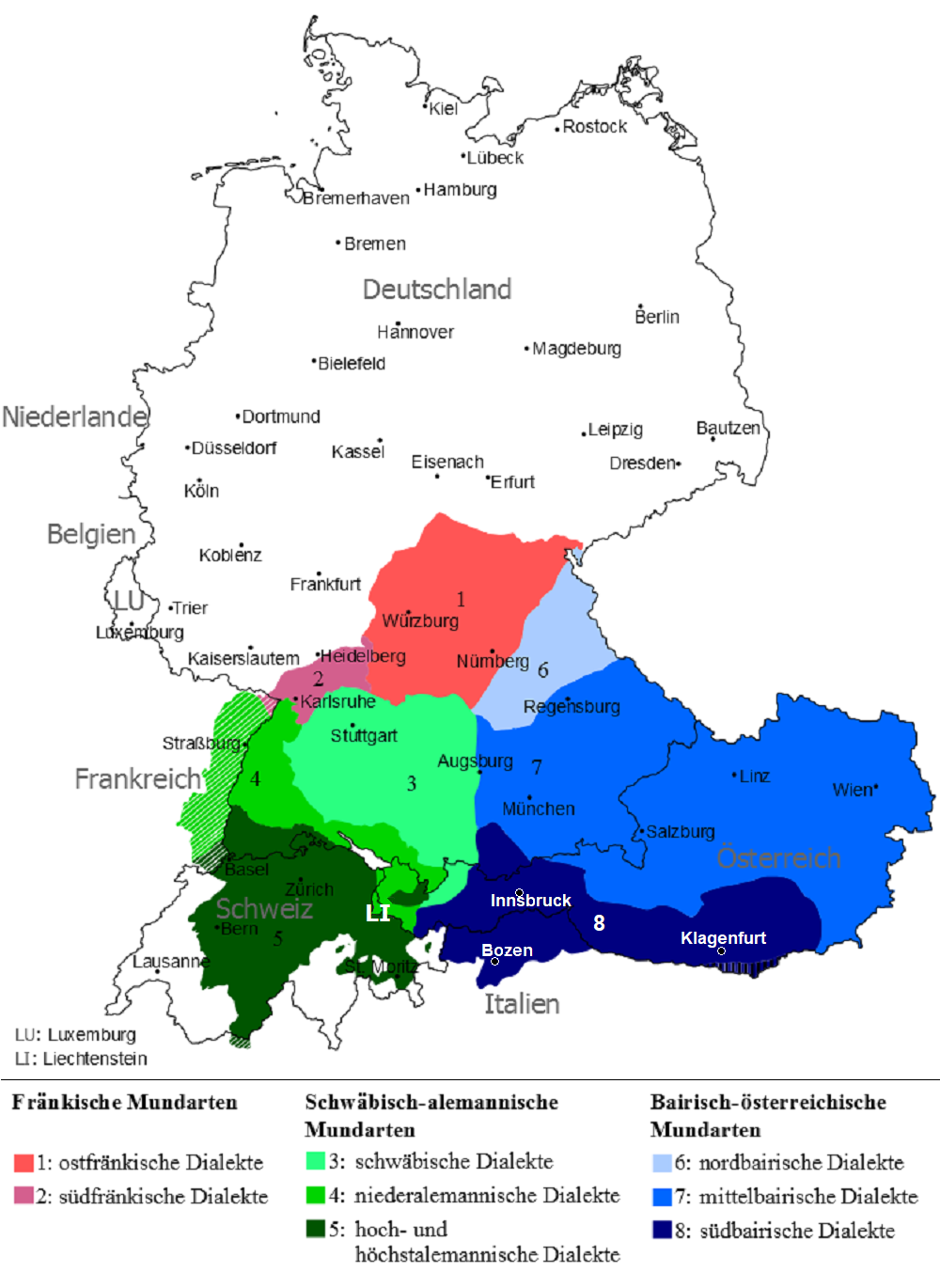
- Upper German after 1945 and the expulsions of the Germans. High Franconian: 1: East Franconian 2: South Franconian Alemannic: 3: Swabian German 4: Low Alemannic 5: High and Highest Alemannic Bavarian: 6: Northern Bavarian 7: Central Bavarian 8: Southern Bavarian

Upper German (German: Oberdeutsch [ˈoːbɐdɔʏtʃ]) is a family of High German dialects spoken primarily in the southern German-speaking area (Sprachraum).

== History ==
In the Old High German time, only Alemannic and Bairisch are grouped as Upper German. In the Middle High German time, East Franconian and sometimes South Franconian are added to this. Swabian splits off from Alemannic due to the New High German diphthongisation (neuhochdeutsche Diphthongierung).

== Family tree ==
Upper German proper comprises the Alemannic and Bavarian dialect groups. Furthermore, the High Franconian dialects, spoken up to the Speyer line isogloss in the north, are often also included in the Upper German dialect group. Whether they should be included as part of Upper German or instead classified as Central German is an open question, as they have traits of both Upper and Central German and are frequently described as a transitional zone. Hence, either scheme can be encountered. Erzgebirgisch, usually lumped in with Upper Saxon on geographical grounds, is closer to East Franconian linguistically, especially the western dialects of Erzgebirgisch.

=== Overview ===
Upper German is divided roughly in multiple different ways, for example in:

- North Upper German (Nordoberdeutsch): East Franconian and South Franconian
- West Upper German (Westoberdeutsch): Swabian and Alemannic
- East Upper German (Ostoberdeutsch): Bavarian (North, Middle and South Bavarian)

or:

- West Upper German: Alemannic (Low and Highest Alemannic, Swabian), East Franconian
- East Upper German: Bavarian (North, Middle and South Bavarian)

or:

- West Upper German: Alemannic in the broad sense (i.e. Alemannic in the strict sense, including Alsatian, and Swabian), South Franconian, East Franconian
- East Upper German: Bavarian (North, Middle and South Bavarian)

or writing dialects (Schriftdialekte, Schreibdialekte) in the Early New High German times:

- West Upper German: South Franconian, Swabian, Alemannic
- East Upper German: Bavarian, East Franconian

In English there is also a grouping into:

- South Upper German: South and Middle Alemannic, South Bavarian, South Middle Bavarian "on the east bank of the Lech" – where the "state of initial consonants is largely that of Old High German"
- North Upper German: North Alemannic, North Bavarian, Middle Bavarian – which "have allegedly weaking many initial fortes"

Attempts to group East Franconian and North Bavarian together as North Upper German are not justified and were not sustainable.

=== Detailed view ===
- High Franconian or Upper Franconian (German: Oberfränkisch, sometimes Hochfränkisch), spoken in the Bavarian Franconia region, as well as in the adjacent regions of northern Baden-Württemberg and southern Thuringia
  - East Franconian (German: Ostfränkisch, Mainfränkisch, colloquially just Fränkisch)
    - Main-Franconian, mainly spoken in Bavarian Franconia, in the adjacent Main-Tauber-Kreis of Baden-Württemberg, as well as in Thuringia south of the Rennsteig ridge in the Thuringian Forest
      - Itzgründish (Itzgründisch), spoken in the Itz Valley
    - Vogtlandish (Vogtländisch), spoken in Vogtland, Saxony [sometimes; sometimes classified as East Central German separated from Upper Franconian]
  - South Franconian (Südfränkisch), spoken in the Heilbronn-Franken region of northern Baden-Württemberg down to the Karlsruhe district
- Alemannic in the broad sense (German: Alemannisch, Alemannisch-Schwäbisch, or also Gesamtalemannisch), spoken in the German state of Baden-Württemberg, in the Bavarian region of Swabia, in Switzerland, Liechtenstein, the Austrian state of Vorarlberg and in Alsace, France
  - Swabian (German: Schwäbisch), spoken mostly in Swabia, and further separated by the sounds in the equivalents of German breit 'broad', groß 'great', Schnee 'snow'
    - West Swabian (Westschwäbisch): broat, grauß, Schnai
    - Central Swabian (Zentralschwäbisch): broit, grauß, Schnai
    - East Swabian (Ostschwäbisch): broit, groaß, Schnäa
    - South Swabian (Südschwäbisch): broit/broat, grooß, Schnee
  - Alemannic in the strict sense (German: Alemannisch)
    - Low Alemannic (Niederalemannisch)
      - Alsatian (Elsässisch), spoken in Alsace, now France
      - Colonia Tovar German or Alemán Coloniero, spoken in Colonia Tovar, Venezuela
      - Basel German (German: Baseldeutsch, Basel German: Baseldytsch)
    - High Alemannic (Hochalemannisch)
      - Bernese German (German: Berndeutsch, Bernese: Bärndütsch)
      - Zurich German (German: Zürichdeutsch, Zurich German: Züritütsch or Züritüütsch)
    - Highest Alemannic (Höchstalemannisch)
      - Walser German (Walserdeutsch) or Walliser German (Walliserdeutsch), spoken in the Wallis Canton of Switzerland
- Bavarian (or Bavarian-Austrian, Bavarian–Austrian) (German: Bairisch, Bairisch-Österreichisch), spoken in the German state of Bavaria, in Austria, and in South Tyrol, Italy
  - Northern Bavarian or North Bavarian (Nordbairisch), spoken mainly in the Bavarian Upper Palatinate region
  - Central Bavarian (Mittelbairisch; also Donaubairisch, literally Danube Bavarian), spoken mainly in Upper and Lower Bavaria, in Salzburg, Upper and Lower Austria
    - Viennese German (Wienerisch), spoken in Vienna and parts of Lower Austria
  - Southern Bavarian or South Bavarian (Südbairisch; sometimes also Alpenbairisch, literally Alpine Bavarian), spoken mainly in the Austrian states of Tyrol, Carinthia and Styria, as well as in South Tyrol, Italy
    - Gottscheerish or Granish (German: Gottscheerisch, Gottscheerish: Göttscheabarisch, Slovene: kočevarščina), spoken in Gottschee, Slovenia, nearly extinct
  - Cimbrian (German: Zimbrisch, Cimbrian: Zimbar, Italian: Italian: lingua cimbra), spoken in the Seven Communities (formerly also in the Thirteen Communities) in Veneto, and around Luserna (Lusern), Trentino, Italy
  - Mòcheno language (German: Fersentalerisch, Mòcheno: Bersntoler sproch, Italian: lingua mòchena), spoken in the Mocheni Valley, Trentino in Italy
  - Hutterite German (German: Hutterisch), spoken in Canada and the United States

Other ways to group Alemannic include:

- Alemannic in the strict sense besides Swabian:
  - Upper-Rhine Alemannic or Upper Rhine Alemannic (Oberrheinalemannisch or Oberrhein-Alemannisch): having shifted -b- between vowels to -w- and -g- between vowels to -ch-
  - Lake Constance Alemannic (Bodenseealemannisch or Bodensee-Alemannisch): having soundings like broat (breit), Goaß (Geiß), Soal (Seil)
  - South or High Alemannic (Südalemannisch or Hochalemannisch)
- Alemannic in the strict sense:
  - Oberrheinisch (Niederalemannisch)
  separated by the Sundgau-Bodensee-Schranke: Kind/Chind
  - Südalemannisch
    - Hochalemannisch
    separated by the Schweizerdeutsche nk-Schranke: trinken/trī(n)chen
    - Höchstalemannisch
- Alemannic in the strict sense (in the early New High German time):
  - Niederalemannisch
    - Elsässisch
    - östliches Niederalemannisch
  - Hochalemannisch
    - Westhochalemannisch
    - Osthochalemannisch
- Alemannic in the broad sense including Swabian (in the Middle High German time):
  - Nordalemannisch or Schwäbisch (between Schwarzwald and Lech; since the 13th century)
  - Niederalemannisch or Oberrheinisch (Elsaß, southern Württemberg, Vorarlberg)
  - Hochalemannisch or Südalemannisch (Südbaden and Swiss)
- Alemannic in the broad sense:
  - Nordalemannisch
    - Schwäbisch
    - Niederalemannisch
  - Mittelalemannisch = Bodenseealemannisch
  - Südalemannisch
    - Hochalemannisch
    - Höchstalemannisch
- Alemannic in the broad sense:
  - Schwäbisch
  - Niederalemannisch
  - Hochalemannisch: having shifted k to kχ
    - Mittelalemannisch
    - Ober- oder Höchstalemannisch: also having shifted k after n to kχ
- Alemannic in the broad sense (with some exemplary differentiations):
  - Niederalemannisch
    - Schwäbisch
    differentiated by the Early New High German diphthongisation (frühneuhochdeutsche Diphthongierung), and also the verbal uniform plural or Einheitsplural (verbaler Einheitsplural) -et/-e and the lexemes Wiese/Matte (Wiese)
    - Oberrheinalemannisch
    - Bodenseealemannisch
  differentiated by shift of k (k-Verschiebung)
  - Hochalemannisch
  differentiated by nasal loss before fricative (Nasalausfall vor Frikativ), and also the inflection of predicative adjectives
  - Höchstalemannisch

Sometimes the dialect of the Western Lake (Seealemannisch, literally Lake Alemannic) (northern of the Bodensee) is differentiated.

== Langobardic (Lombardic) ==
Based on the fact that Langobardic (German: Langobardisch), extinct around 1000, has undergone the High German consonant shift, it is also often classified as Upper German. A competing view is that it is an open question where to place Langobardic inside of Old High German and if it is Old High German at all.
