= Low Alemannic German =

Northern branch of Alemannic in western Germany

- Niederalemannisch
- Native to: Germany
- Language family: Indo-European: Germanic; West Germanic; Elbe Germanic; Upper German; Alemannic; Low Alemannic German
- Writing system: Latin (German alphabet)

Language codes
- ISO 639-3: –
- Glottolog: lowa1241
- Areas where Alemannic German dialects are spoken Low Alemannic

Low Alemannic German (German: Niederalemannisch) is a branch of Alemannic German, which is part of Upper German. Its varieties are only partly intelligible to non-Alemannic speakers.

== Subdivisions ==
- Lake Constance Alemannic (de)
  - Northern Vorarlberg (de)
  - Allgäu dialect (de)
  - Baar dialect
  - Southern Württemberg
- Upper Rhenish Alemannic (de)
  - Basel German
  - Baden dialects north of Markgräflerland
  - Alsatian, spoken in Alsace, in some villages of the Phalsbourg county in Lorraine and by some Amish in Indiana
  - Low Alemannic dialects in the Black Forest
  - Colonia Tovar dialect, Venezuela

== Features ==
The feature that distinguishes Low Alemannic from High Alemannic is the retention of Germanic /k/, for instance kalt 'cold' vs. High Alemannic chalt.

The feature that distinguishes Low Alemannic from Swabian is the retention of the Middle High German monophthongs, for instance Huus 'house' vs. Swabian Hous or Ziit 'time' vs. Swabian Zejt.

== Phonology ==
=== Consonants ===
Voiced obstruents do not occur, as is typical for Upper German dialects.

labial	alveolar	postalveolar	palatal	velar	uvular	glottal
m	n			ŋ		
b̥ (pʰ)³	d̥ (tʰ)³			g̊ kʰ		
f	s	ʃ	(ç)¹	x¹	(ʁ)²	h
p͡f	t͡s					
ʋ	r²		j			

¹/x/ is palatalized as [ç] after front vowels in the northern varieties (like in Standard German) but kept as [x] in southern varieties. Diverging from Standard German /x/ is not palatalized after /r/, a feature shared with other alemannic varieties.

²/r/ is most commonly pronounced as [ʁ].

³ /pʰ/ and /tʰ/ don't occur in autochthonous vocabulary but are used by speakers in differing frequency when using words from Standard German or speaking in more formal registers.

=== Vowels ===
Middle High German	Low Alemannic	Standard German	English Translation
hûs	Huus /hu:s/ or Hüüs /hy:s/	Haus /haʊs/	house
brûchen	bruuche /b̥ru:xə/, bruche /b̥ruxə/ or brüche /b̥ryxə/	brauchen /braʊxən/	to need
zît	Ziit /tsi:d̥/ or Zit /tsid̥/	Zeit /tsaɪt/	time
wîn	Wii /ʋi:/	Wein /vaɪn/	wine
liute	Liit /li:d̥/ or Lit /lid̥/	Leute /lɔɪtə/	people
miuse	Miis /mi:s/	Mäuse /mɔɪzə/	mice
frî	frei /frɛi/	frei /fraɪ/	free
bûwen	boie /b̥oiə/ or boue /b̥ouə/	bauen /baʊən/	to build
niu	nei /nɛi/	neu /nɔɪ/	new
buoch	Buech /b̥uəx/ or Böech /b̥øəx/	Buch /bu:x/	book
tief	dief /d̥iəf/	tief /ti:f/	deep
büecher	Biecher /b̥iəxər/	Bücher /by:çər/	books
gibrâcht	broocht /b̥ro:xd̥/ or bròòcht /brɔ:xd̥/	gebracht /gəbraxt/	brought
schlâfen	schloofe /ʃlo:fə/ or schlòòfe /ʃlɔ:fə/	schlafen /ʃla:fən/	to sleep
brôt	Broot /b̥ro:d̥/	Brot /bro:t/	bread
schnê	Schnee /ʃne:/	Schnee /ʃne:/	snow
kæse	Kääs /kʰæ:s/ or Kèès /kʰɛ:s/	Käse /kɛ:zə/ or /ke:zə/	cheese
sunne	Sunne /sunə/	Sonne /zɔnə/	sun
sun	Sùùn /sʊ:n/ or Suun /su:n/	Sohn /zo:n/	son
böcke	Begg /b̥eg̊/	Böcke /bœkə/	billy goats
ast	Aschd /ɑʃd̥/ or /aʃd̥/	Ast /ast/	branch
züge	Zììg /tsɪːg̊/	Züge /tsy:gə/	trains
ist	ìsch /ɪʃ/	ist /ɪst/	is
wetter	Wädder /ʋæd̥ər/ or Wèdder /ʋɛd̥ər/	Wetter /vɛtər/	weather
boum	Baum /b̥æum/, Baüm /b̥ɔɪm/	Baum /baʊm/	tree
böume	Baim /b̥æim/	Bäume /bɔɪmə/	trees
bein	Bai /b̥æi/	Bein /baɪn/	leg

== Orthography ==
There exists no official orthography and authors use different kinds of orthographies for their work.

(All of the below is specific to the dialects spoken near Freiburg im Breisgau)

Vowels:

Short		Long	
Orthography	Pronunciation	Orthography	Pronunciation
a	[a] or [ɑ]	aa	[aː] or [ɑ:]
ä	[æ]	ää	[æː]
è	[ɛ]	èè	[ɛː]
e	[e, ə]	ee	[eː]
i or y	[i]	ii or yy	[iː]
ì or i	[ɪ]	ìì or ii	[ɪ:]
o	[o]	oo	[oː]
ù	[ʊ]	ùù	[ʊː]
u	[u]	uu	[u:]
ü	[y]	üü	[y:]

Consonants:

Are as in Standard German, with the following notes:

- kh is an aspirated [kʰ]
- ng is a velar nasal [ŋ]
- ngg is a velar nasal followed by a velar plosive [ŋɡ]
- ph is an aspirated [pʰ]
- th is an aspirated [tʰ]
- s is always voiceless [s] or [z̥]
- b, d and g are voiceless [b̥], [d̥] and [g̊].

== Articles ==
Definite Article

Case	Masculine	Feminine	Neuter
Nom/Acc Sg	der Man	d Frau	s Kind
Dat Sg	im Man	(in) der Frau	im Kind
Nom/Acc Pl	d Mane	d Fraue	d Kinder
Dat Pl	(in) der Mane	(in) der Fraue	(in) der Kinder

Indefinite Article

Case	Masculine	Feminine	Neuter
Nom/Acc Sg	e Man	e Frau	e Kind
Dat Sg	im e Man	in ere Frau	im e Kind

== Substantives ==
Plurals

- Class I: Plural = Singular (e.g. Ääber → Ääber)
- Class II: Plural = Singular + Umlaut (e.g. Baum → Baim; Vader → Väder)
- Class IIIa: Plural = Singular + -e (e.g. Man → Mane; Ags → Agse)
- Class IIIb: Plural = Singular + -̈e (e.g. Frosch → Fresche)
- Class IVa: Plural = Singular + -er (e.g. Lyyb → Lyyber; Schùg → Schùger)
- Class IVb: Plural = Singular + -̈er (e.g. Wald → Wälder; Blad → Bleder)
- Class V: No Plural (e.g. Chees; Zemänd)
- Class VI: No Singular (Plural Only) (e.g. Bilger; Fèèrine)

Diminutives

- Standard ending is -li (e.g. Aimer → Aimerli)
- If the word ends in -l, then the ending is -eli (e.g. Dääl → Dääleli)
- If the word ends in -el, then the ending is -i (e.g. Degel → Degeli)
- If the word ends in -e, remove the -e and add -li (e.g. Bèère → Bèèrli)
- The rules for this can be quite complex and depend on the region. Sometimes diminutives require umlaut, other times not.

== Adjectives ==
Weak Declension

Case	Masculine	Feminine	Neuter
Nom/Acc Sg	der groos Man	di göed Frau	s klai Kind
Dat Sg	im (e) groose Man	in der / in ere göede Frau	im (e) klaine Kind
Nom/Acc Pl	di groose Mane	di göede Fraue	di klaine Kinder
Dat Pl	in der groose Mane	in der göede Fraue	in der klaine Kinder

Strong Declension

Case	Masculine	Feminine	Neuter
Nom/Acc Sg	göede Man	göedi Frau	göed Brood
Dat Sg	göedem Man	göeder Frau	göedem Brood
Nom/Acc Pl	groosi Mane	groosi Fraue	klaini Kinder
Dat Pl	in groose Mane	in groose Fraue	in klaine Kinder

Comparative

- Standard ending -er (e.g. fèin → fèiner)

Superlative

- Standard ending -(e)schd (e.g. fèin → fèinschd)

Irregular

Positive	Comparative	Superlative
vyyl	mee	maischd
göed	beser	beschd

== Pronouns ==
Personal Pronouns

English	Hochdeutsch	Alemmanisch Nom	Dative	Accusative
I	ich	ich, ii, i	miir, mir, mer	mii, mi
you	du	duu, du, de	diir, dir, der	dii, di
he	er	äär, är, er	iim, im, em	iin, in, en, e
she	sie	sii, si	iire, ire, ere	sii, si
it	es	ääs, äs, es, s	iim, im, em	ääs, äs, es, s
we	wir	miir, mir, mer	ùns, is	ùns, is
you	ihr	iir, ir, er	èich, ich	èich, ich
they	sie	sii, si	iine, ine, ene	sii, si

== Verbs ==
1. Infinitive

Infinitive ends in -e

- Some monosyllabic verbs do not have this ending (e.g. chùù, döe, goo, gschää, haa, loo, nee, sää, schdoo, schlaa, syy, zie, etc.)

2. Participle

2.1 Prefix

- The prefix for g- or ge-
- Before b, d, g, bf, dsch, and z is merged into the word and not visible (e.g. broochd, glaubd, etc.)

2.2 Suffix

- Strong Verbs end in -e (e.g. gäse, glofe)
- Weak Verbs end in -d or -ed (e.g. bùzd, gchaufd)

2.3 Types

2.3.1 Infinitive and Present Sg y/èi/ai - Participle i
2.3.1.1 y > i (e.g. abwyyse > abgwiise)
2.3.1.2 èi > i (e.g. verzèie > verziie)
2.3.1.3 ai > i (e.g. schaide > gschiide)
2.3.2 Infinitive and Present Sg ie/u/au/èi/i - Participle o/öu/öe
2.3.2.1 ie > o (e.g. biede > bode)
2.3.2.2 u > o (e.g. sufe > gsofe)
2.3.2.3 au > o (e.g. laufe > glofe)
2.3.2.4 èi > öu (e.g. rèie > gröue)
2.3.2.5 ie > öe (e.g. riefe > gröefe)
2.3.2.5 i > o (e.g. wiige > gwooge)
2.3.3 Infinitive and Present Sg i - Participle ù
2.3.3.1 i > u (e.g. binde > bùnde)
2.3.4 Infinitive ä/e - Present i - Participle o/u
2.3.4.1 ä - i - o (e.g. bräche > broche)
2.3.4.2 ä - i - u (e.g. hälfe > ghùlfe)
2.3.4.3 e/è - i - o (e.g. verdèèrbe > verdoorbe)
2.3.4.4 e - i - ù (e.g. schmelze > gschmùlze)
2.3.5 Infinitive ä/i - Present i - Participle ä
2.3.5.1 ä - i - ä (e.g. äse > gäse)
2.3.5.2 i - i - ä (e.g. bide > bäde)
2.3.6 Infinitive Vowel is the same as the Participle
2.3.5.1 (e.g. bache > bache; fale > gfale)

3. Conjugation
3.1 Present Tense 3.1.1 Regular Verb

Person	Ending	Example
1st Sg	-Ø	ich mach
2nd Sg	-sch	duu machsch
3rd Sg	-d	är machd
Plural	-e	mir mache

== Numbers ==
	Cardinal	Ordinal	Multiplicative I	Multiplicative II
1	ais	èèrschd	aifach	aimool
2	zwai	zwaid	zwaifach	zwaimool
3	drèi	drid	drèifach	drèimool
4	vier	vierd	vierfach	viermool
5	fimf	fimfd	fimffach	fimfmool
6	segs	segsd	segsfach	segsmool
7	siibe	sibd	siibefach	siibemool
8	aachd	aachd	aachdfach	aachdmool
9	nyyn	nyynd	nyynfach	nyynmool
10	zee	zeend	zeefach	zeemool
11	elf	elfd	elffach	elfmool
12	zwelf	zwelfd	zwelffach	zwelfmool
13	dryzee	dryzeend	dryzeefach	dryzeemool
14	vierzee	vierzeend	vierzeefach	vierzeemool
15	fùfzee	fùfzeend	fùfzeefach	fùfzeemool
16	sächzee	sächzeend	sächzeefach	sächzeemool
17	sibzee	sibzeend	sibzeefach	sibzeemool
18	aachdzee	aachdzeend	aachdzeefach	aachdzeemool
19	nyynzee	nyynzeend	nyynzeefach	nyynzeemool
20	zwanzg	zwanzigschd	zwanzgfach	zwanzgmool
21	ainezwanzg	ainezwanzigschd	ainezwanzgfach	ainezwanzgmool
