= East Franconian German =

Dialect

East Franconian
- Fränggisch; Standard High German: Ostfränkisch, Fränkisch
- Native to: Germany (Bavaria, Thuringia, Saxony, Baden-Württemberg, Hesse)
- Native speakers: 4,900,000 (2006)
- Language family: Indo-European: Germanic; West Germanic; Elbe Germanic; Upper German; High Franconian; East Franconian
- Early forms: Proto-Indo-European: Proto-Germanic; Proto-West Germanic; Elbe Germanic; Old East Franconian
- Writing system: Latin (German alphabet)

Language codes
- ISO 639-3: vmf
- Glottolog: main1267
- Linguasphere: 52-ACB-dj
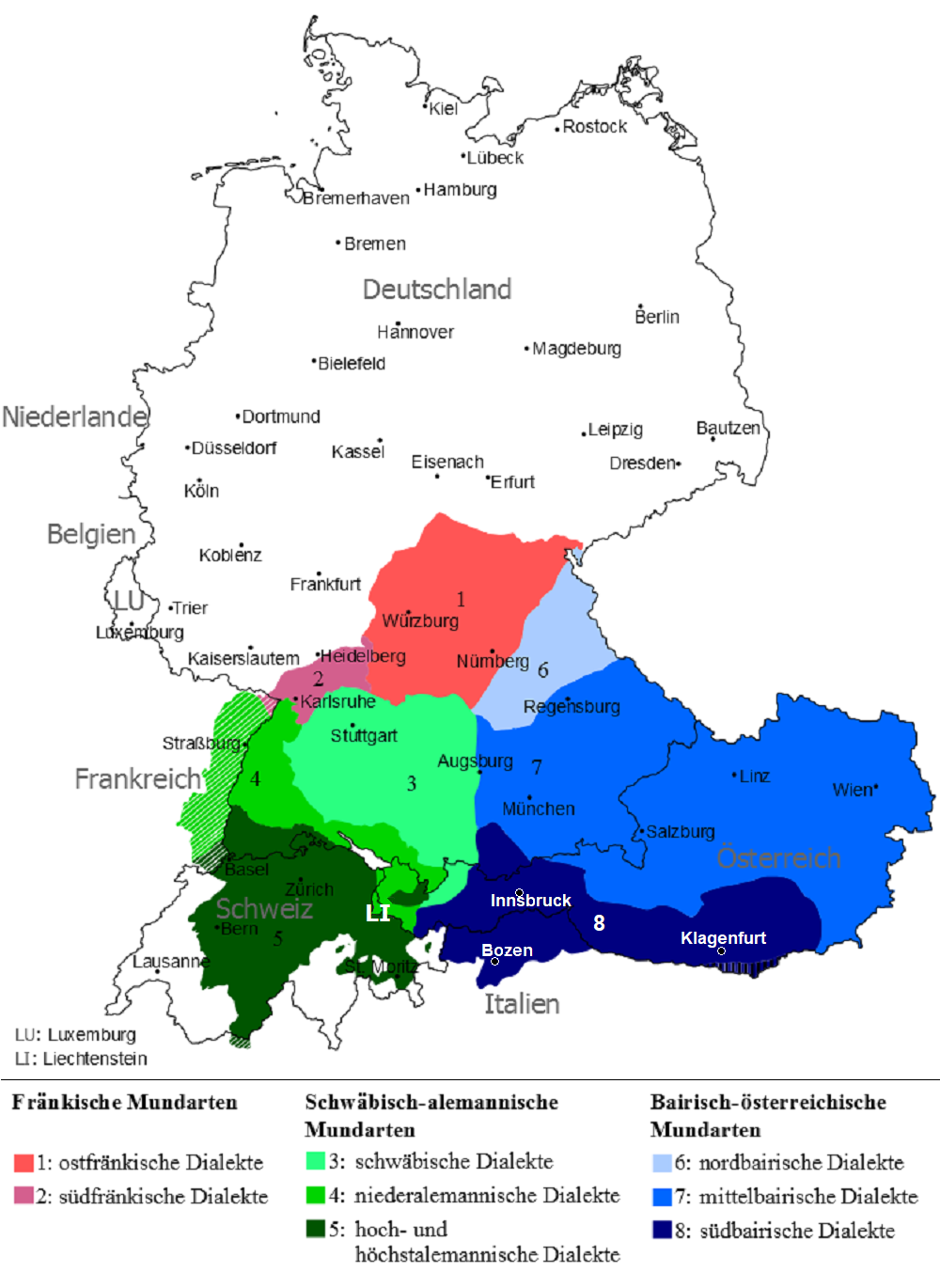
- 1: East Franconian

- East Franconian is classified as Vulnerable by the UNESCO Atlas of the World's Languages in Danger

East Franconian (German: Ostfränkisch [ˈɔstfʁɛŋkɪʃ]), usually referred to as Franconian in German (Fränkisch [ˈfʁɛŋkɪʃ]), is a dialect spoken in Franconia, the northern part of the federal state of Bavaria and other areas in Germany around Nuremberg, Bamberg, Coburg, Würzburg, Hof, Bayreuth, Meiningen, Bad Mergentheim, and Crailsheim. The major subgroups are Unterostfränkisch (spoken in Lower Franconia and southern Thuringia), Oberostfränkisch (spoken in Upper and Middle Franconia) and Südostfränkisch (spoken in some parts of Middle Franconia and Hohenlohe). Until the wholesale expulsion of Germans from Bohemia, the dialect was also spoken around Saaz (today: Žatec).

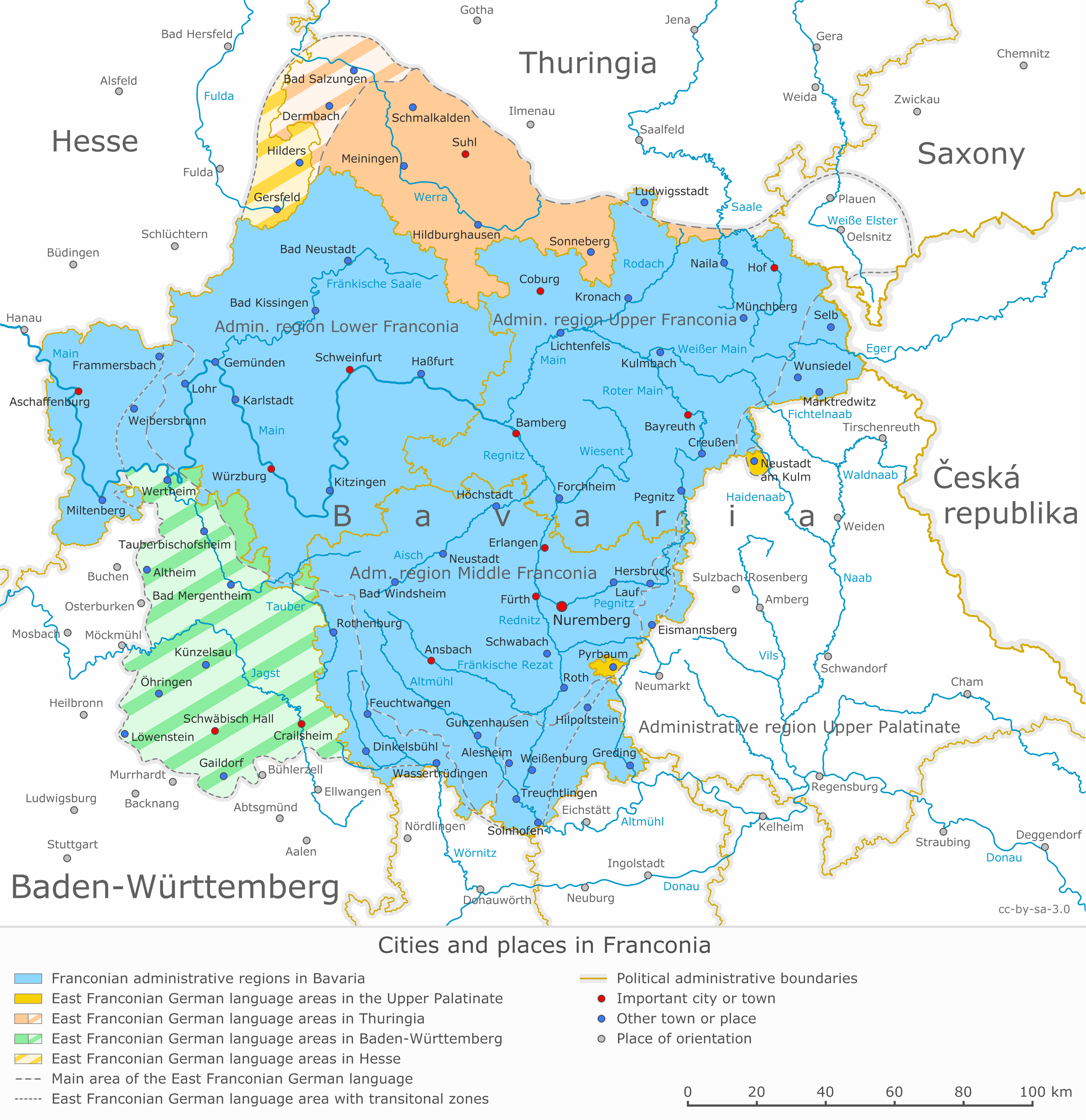
East Franconian German

In the transitional area between Rhine Franconian in the northwest and the Austro-Bavarian dialects in the southeast, East Franconian has elements of Central German and Upper German. The same goes only for South Franconian German in adjacent Baden-Württemberg. East Franconian is one of the German dialects with the highest number of speakers.

The scope of East Franconian is disputed, because it overlaps with neighbouring dialects like Bavarian and Swabian in the south, Rhine Franconian in the west and Upper Saxon in the north.

East Franconian is researched by the "Fränkisches Wörterbuch" project in Fürth, which is run by Bayerische Akademie der Wissenschaften and Erlangen-Nuremberg University.

== Grouping ==
East Franconian is subdivided in multiple different ways.

One view differentiates three major sub-dialects:

- Ostfränkisch (East Franconian)
  - Oberostfränkisch (Upper East Franconian): in the Würzburger Übergangsstreifen, Regnitz-Raum Obermain-Raum, Bayreuther-Raum, Obermain-Raum, Bayreuther-Raum, Nailaer-Raum, Plauener-Raum
  - Unterostfränkisch (Lower East Franconian): in the Würzburger-Raum, subdivided in a Northern and Southern part, Coburger-Raum, Henneberger-Raum, Reußischer-Raum
  - Südostfränkisch (South East Franconian)

Another view differentiates two major sub-dialects:

- Ostfränkisch (East Franconian): in Franken and a part of Baden-Württemberg with Wertheim and Tauberbischofsheim and also in the Vogtland
  - Unterostfränkisch (Lower East Franconian): in Unterfranken and in the Coburger and Henneberger Raum
  - Oberostfränkisch (Upper East Franconian): in Ober- and Mittelfranken

A third view has:

- Ostfränkisch (East Franconian)
  - Unterostfränkisch (Lower East Franconian)
    - Hennebergisch: around Meiningen – Suhl – Schmalkalden
    - engeres Unterostfränkisch (Lower East Franconian in a stricter sense): hohenlohischer Raum, Würzburger Raum
      - Würzburgisch: in the Würzburg area (Würzburger Raum)
  - area between Unterostfränkisch and Oberostfränkisch: Ansbacher-, Neustädter- und Coburger Raum
  - Oberostfränkisch (Upper East Franconian): Regnitz-, Hof-Bayreuther-, Obermain-, Nailaer- und vogtländischer Raum
    - Vogtländisch (= Ostfränkisch-Vogtländisch): vogtländischer Raum

== See also ==
- Franconia
- Eberhard Wagner, German regional dialect researcher, in the dialect of Upper Franconia (East Franconian German).
