= Swabian German =

Dialect group of Alemannic German

Swabian
- Schwäbisch, schwäbische Mundart
- Native to: Germany
- Ethnicity: Swabians
- Native speakers: 820,000 (2006)
- Language family: Indo-European: Germanic; West Germanic; High German; Upper German; Alemannic; Swabian
- Writing system: Latin (German alphabet)

Language codes
- ISO 639-3: swg
- Glottolog: swab1242
- IETF: swg
- Areas where Alemannic dialects are spoken Swabian

Swabian (German: Schwäbisch [ˈʃvɛːbɪʃ]) is one of the dialect groups of Upper German, sometimes one of the dialect groups of Alemannic German (in the broad sense), that belong to the High German dialect continuum. It is mainly spoken in Swabia, which is located in central and southeastern Baden-Württemberg (including its capital Stuttgart and the Swabian Jura region) and the southwest of Bavaria (Bavarian Swabia). Furthermore, Swabian German dialects are spoken by Caucasus Germans in Transcaucasia. The dialects of the Danube Swabian population of Hungary, the former Yugoslavia and Romania are only nominally Swabian and can be traced back not only to Swabian but also to Franconian, Bavarian and Hessian dialects, with locally varying degrees of influence of the initial dialects.

== Description ==
Swabian is cited as "40 percent intelligible" to the speakers of Standard German due to its pronunciation and partly differing grammar and vocabulary.

In 2009, the word Muggeseggele (a Swabian idiom), meaning the scrotum of a housefly, was voted in a readers' survey by Stuttgarter Nachrichten, the largest newspaper in Stuttgart, as the most beautiful Swabian word, well ahead of any other term. The expression is used in an ironic way to describe a small unit of measure and is deemed appropriate to use in front of small children (compare Bubenspitzle). German broadcaster SWR's children's website, Kindernetz, explained the meaning of Muggeseggele in their Swabian dictionary in the Swabian-based TV series Ein Fall für B.A.R.Z.

== Characteristics ==
- The ending "-ad" is used for verbs in the first person plural. (For example, "we go" is mir gangad instead of Standard German's wir gehen.)
- As in other Alemannic dialects, the pronunciation of "s" before "t" and "p" is [ʃ] (For example, Fest ("party"), is pronounced as Feschd.)
- The voice-onset time for plosives is about halfway between where it would be expected for a clear contrast between voiced and unvoiced-aspirated plosives. This difference is most noticeable on the unvoiced plosives, rendering them very similar to or indistinguishable from voiced plosives:

"t" to "d"		"p" to "b"	
Standard High German (SHG)	Swabian	Standard High German (SHG)	Swabian
Tasche (bag)	Dasch	putzen (to clean)	butza
Tag (day)	Dag	Papa (dad)	Baba

- One obvious feature is the addition of the diminutive "-le" suffix on many words in the German language. With the addition of this "-le" (pronounced /lə/), the article of the noun automatically becomes "das" in the German language, as in Standard High German (SHG). The Swabian "-le" is the same as SHG "-lein" or "-chen", but is used, arguably, more often in Swabian. A small house (SHG: Haus) is a Häuschen or Häuslein in SHG, a Haisle in Swabian. In some regions, "-la" for plural is used. (For example, Haisle may become Haisla, Spätzle becomes Spätzla.) Many surnames in Swabia are also made to end in "-le".

SHG	Swabian
Zug (train)	Zigle
Haus (house)	Haisle
Kerl (guy)	Kerle
Mädchen (girl)	Mädle
Baum (tree)	Baimle

- Articles (SHG: der, die, das) are often pronounced as "dr", "d" and "s" ("s Haus" instead of "das Haus").
- The "ch" is sometimes omitted or replaced. "ich", "dich" and "mich" may become "i", "di" and "mi".
- Vowels:

SHG	Swabian	Example (SHG = Swabian)	English
short a [a]	[a]	machen = macha	to make
long a [aː]	[ɔː]	schlafen = schlofa	to sleep
short e [ɛ]	[e]	Mensch, fest = Mentsch, fescht	person, steady
short e [ɛ]	[ɛ]	Fest = Fäscht	festival
long e [eː]	[ɛa̯]	leben = läaba	to live
short o [ɔ]	[ɔ]	Kopf = Kopf	head
long o [oː]	[aʊ̯]	hoch, schon = hau, schau	high, already
short ö [œ]	[e]	kennen, Köpfe = kenna, Kepf	to know, heads (pl)
long ö [øː]	[eː]	schön = schee	beautiful
short i [ɪ]	[e]	in = en	in
long i (ie) [iː]	[ia̯]	nie = nia	never
short ü [ʏ]	[ɪ]	über = iber	over
long ü [yː]	[ia̯]	müde = miad	tired
short u [ʊ]	[ɔ]	und = ond	and
long u [uː]	[ua̯]	gut = guat	good
ei [aɪ̯]	[ɔa̯], [ɔɪ̯] (Note: From MHG [ei̯])	Stein = Schdoa/Schdoi	stone
ei [aɪ̯]	[a̯i] (Note: From MHG [iː])	mein = mei	my
au [aʊ̯]	[aʊ̯] (Note: From MHG â, ô or ou)	laufen = laofa	to run
au [aʊ̯]	[a̯u] (Note: From MHG û)	Haus = Hous	house
eu [ɔʏ̯]	[a̯i], [ui̯]	Feuer = Feijer/Fuijer	fire

In many regions, the Swabian dialect is spoken with a unique intonation that is also present when native speakers speak in SHG. Similarly, there is only one alveolar fricative phoneme /s/, which is shared with most other southern dialects. Most Swabian-speakers are unaware of the difference between /s/ and /z/ and do not attempt to make it when they speak Standard German.

The voiced plosives, the post-alveolar fricative, and the frequent use of diminutives based on "l" suffixes gives the dialect a very "soft" or "mild" feel, often felt to be in sharp contrast to the harder varieties of German spoken in the North.

== Phonology ==
=== Consonants ===
	Labial	Alveolar	Post- alveolar	Palatal	Velar	Uvular	Pharyngeal/ Glottal
Plosive	p b	t d			k ɡ		
Affricate	b̥f	d̥s	(d̥ʃ)				
Nasal	m	n			ŋ		
Fricative	f v	s	ʃ	(ç)	x (ɣ)	ʁ	(ʕ) h
Approximant		l		j		ʁ	

- Voiceless plosives are frequently aspirated as [pʰ tʰ kʰ].
- Voiced consonants /b d ɡ v/ can be devoiced as [b̥ d̥ ɡ̊ v̥] after a voiceless consonant.
- Allophones of /ʁ/ are often a pharyngeal or velar sound, or lowered to an approximant [ʕ] [ɣ] [ʁ̞].
- [ç] occurs as an intervocalic allophone of /x, h/.

=== Vowels ===
	Front		Central		Back	
	short	long	short	long	short	long
Close	ɪ i	iː			u	uː
Close-mid	e	eː	ə		o	oː
Open-mid	ɛ	ɛː	(ɐ)		ʌ ɔ	ɔː
Open			a	aː		

- /a/ preceding a nasal consonant may be pronounced as [ɐ]. When /a/ is lengthened, before a nasal consonant, realized as [ʌː].
- /ə/ preceding an /r/ can be pronounced as [ʌ].

Diphthongs
	Front	Central	Back
Close	iə		uə, ui
Mid	eə	əi	əu, ɔe
Open	ae		ao

== Classification and variation ==
Swabian is categorized as an Alemannic dialect, which in turn is one of the two types of Upper German dialects (the other being Bavarian).

A sticker that translates as: "We can do everything. Except [speak] standard German."

The Swabian dialect is composed of numerous sub-dialects, each of which has its own variations. These sub-dialects can be categorized by the difference in the formation of the past participle of 'sein' (to be) into gwäa and gsei. The Gsei group is nearer to other Alemannic dialects, such as Swiss German. It can be divided into South-East Swabian, West Swabian and Central Swabian.

=== Danube Swabian dialects ===
The Danube Swabians from Hungary, Romania, and former Yugoslavia have been speaking several different Swabian dialects, called locally Schwowisch, some being similar to the original Swabian dialect, but also the Bavarian dialect, mostly with Palatine and Hesse mixed dialects. In this regard, the Banat Swabians speak the Banat Swabian dialect.

== Recognition in mass media ==
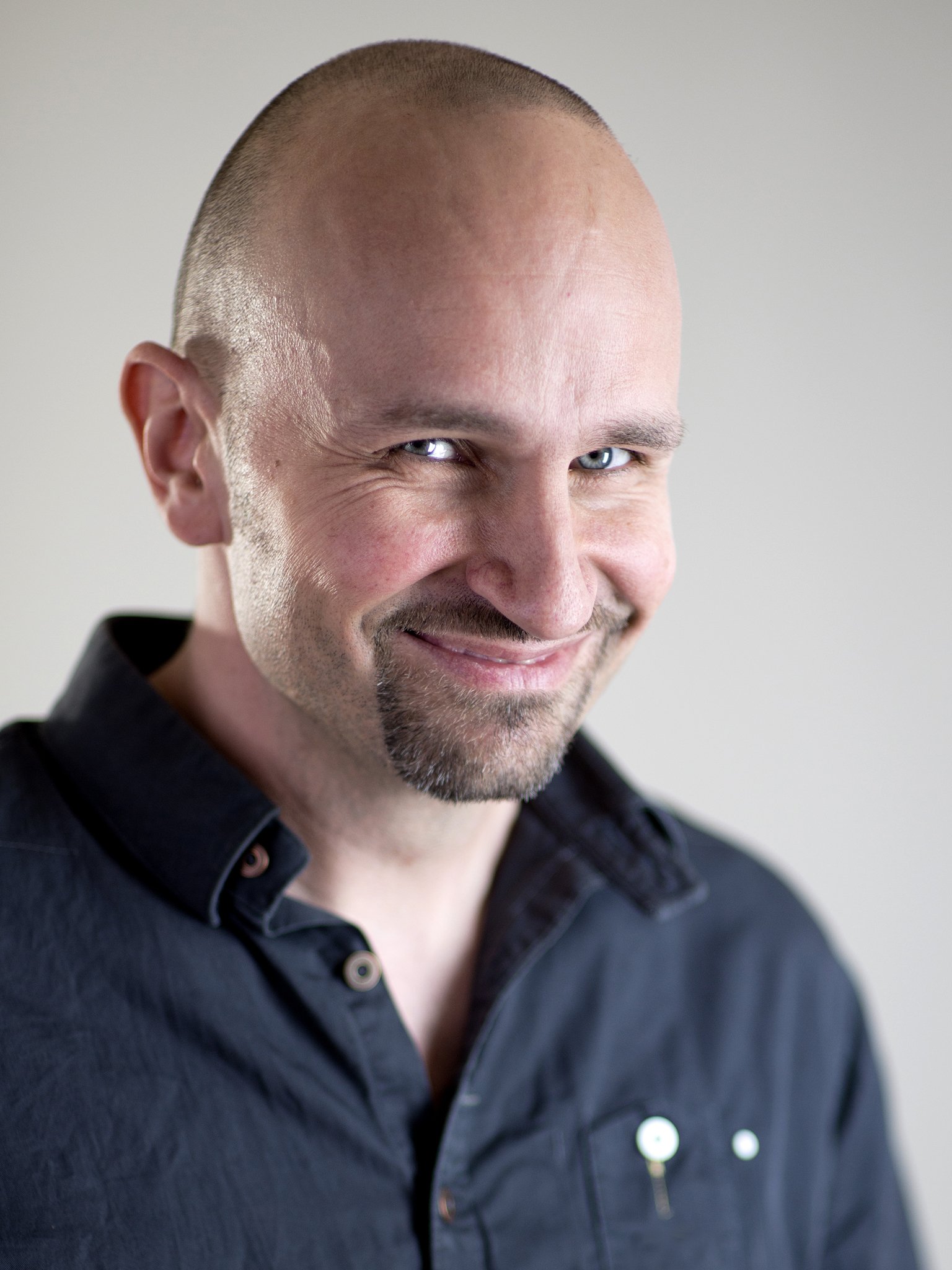
Dominik Kuhn (Dodokay) (2012)

The Baden-Württemberg Chamber of Commerce launched an advertising campaign with the slogan "Wir können alles. Außer Hochdeutsch." which means "We can [do] everything. Except [speak] Standard German" to boost Swabian pride for their dialect and industrial achievements. However, it failed to impress Northern Germans and neighboring Baden. Dominik Kuhn (Dodokay) became famous in Germany with Swabian fandub videos, dubbing among others Barack Obama with German dialect vocals and revised text. In the German dubbing of the 2001 movie Monsters Inc., the Abominable Snowman, played by John Ratzenberger in the original English version and Walter von Hauff in the German version, speaks in the Swabian dialect.

== Swabian dialect writers ==
- Sebastian Sailer (1714–1777)
- August Lämmle (de) (1876–1962)
- Josef Eberle (as Sebastian Blau) (de) (1901–1986)
- Thaddäus Troll (1914–1980)
- Hellmut G. Haasis (born 1942)
- Peter Schlack (de) (born 1943)
- Gerhard Raff (born 1946)

== See also ==
- Muss i denn

== Literature ==
- Streck, Tobias (2012). Phonologischer Wandel im Konsonantismus der alemannischen Dialekte Baden-Württembergs : Sprachatlasvergleich, Spontansprache und dialektometrische Studien (in German). Stuttgart: Steiner. ISBN 978-3-515-10068-7.
- Cercignani, Fausto (1979). The consonants of German : synchrony and diachrony. Milano: Cisalpino-Goliardica. LCCN 81192307.
