= German language =

West Germanic language

German
- Deutsch
- Pronunciation: [dɔɪ̯tʃ]
- Native to: Germany, Switzerland, Austria, Liechtenstein, Luxembourg, Belgium, South Tyrol (Italy), Namibia
- Speakers: L1: 95 million L2: 80–85 million (2014)
- Language family: Indo-European: Germanic; West Germanic; High German; German
- Early forms: Old High German: Middle High German; Early New High German
- Standard forms: Standard German (German, Swiss, Austrian)
- Dialects: German dialects
- Writing system: Since Old High German: Latin script (German alphabet); German Braille; Until the mid-20th century: Hebrew alphabet
- Signed forms: German Sign Language Swiss-German Sign Language Austrian Sign Language

Official status
- Official language in: 6 countries: Austria; Belgium; Germany; Liechtenstein; Luxembourg; Switzerland; 1 subdivision: South Tyrol (Italy); Various International institutions
- Recognised minority language in: 9 countries: Brazil (2 municipalities); Czech Republic (select localities); Denmark (Syddanmark); Hungary (Sopron); Namibia; Poland (Upper Silesia); Romania (select localities); Russia (Azovo German National District); Slovakia (Krahule)

Language codes
- ISO 639-1: de
- ISO 639-2: ger (B) deu (T)
- ISO 639-3: Variously: deu – German gmh – Middle High German goh – Old High German gct – Colonia Tovar German bar – Bavarian cim – Cimbrian geh – Hutterite German ksh – Kölsch nds – Low German (Note: The status of Low German as a German variety or separate language is subject to discussion.) sli – Lower Silesian ltz – Luxembourgish (Note: The status of Luxembourgish as a German variety or separate language is subject to discussion.) vmf – Mainfränkisch mhn – Mòcheno pfl – Palatinate German pdc – Pennsylvania Dutch pdt – Plautdietsch (Note: The status of Plautdietsch as a German variety or separate language is subject to discussion.) swg – Swabian German gsw – Swiss German uln – Unserdeutsch sxu – Upper Saxon wae – Walser German wep – Westphalian hrx – Riograndenser Hunsrückisch yec – Yenish yid – Yiddish
- Glottolog: stan1295
- Linguasphere: 52-ACB–dl (Standard German); 52-AC (Continental West Germanic); 52-ACB (Deutsch & Dutch); 52-ACB-d (Central German); 52-ACB-e & -f (Upper and Swiss German); 52-ACB-h (Émigré German varieties, including 52-ACB-hc (Hutterite German) & 52-ACB-he (Pennsylvania Dutch)); 52-ACB-i (Yenish); Totalling 285 varieties: 52-ACB-daa to 52-ACB-i
- Sole official language Co-official language National or recognised minority language Minority language

German (Deutsch, pronounced [dɔɪ̯tʃ]) is a West Germanic language from the Indo-European language family, mainly spoken in Western and Central Europe. It is the majority and official (or co-official) language in Germany, Austria, Switzerland, and Liechtenstein. It is also an official language of Luxembourg, Belgium and the Italian autonomous province of South Tyrol, as well as a recognised national language in Namibia. There are also notable German-speaking communities in other parts of Europe, including: Poland (Upper Silesia), the Czech Republic (North Bohemia), Denmark (North Schleswig), Slovakia (Krahule), Romania and Hungary (Sopron). Overseas, sizeable communities of German-speakers are found in the Americas.

German is one of the major languages of the world, with nearly 100 million native speakers and over 130 million total speakers as of 2024. It is the most spoken native language within the European Union. German is the second-most widely spoken Germanic language, after English, both as a first and as a second language. German is also widely taught as a foreign language, especially in continental Europe (where it is the third most taught foreign language after English and French) and in the United States (where it is the third most commonly learned second language in K-12 education and among the most studied foreign languages in higher education after Spanish and French). Overall, German is the fourth most commonly learned second language globally. The language has been influential in the fields of philosophy, theology, science, and technology. It is the second most commonly used language in science and the third most widely used language on websites. The German-speaking countries are ranked fifth in terms of annual publication of new books, with one-tenth of all books (including e-books) in the world being published in German.

German is most closely related to other West Germanic languages, namely Afrikaans, Dutch, English, the Frisian languages, and Scots. It also contains close similarities in vocabulary to some languages in the North Germanic group, such as Danish, Norwegian, and Swedish. Modern German gradually developed from Old High German, which in turn developed from Proto-Germanic during the Early Middle Ages.

German is an inflected language, with four cases for nouns, pronouns, and adjectives (nominative, accusative, genitive, dative); three genders (masculine, feminine, neuter) and two numbers (singular, plural). It has strong and weak verbs. The majority of its vocabulary is derived from the ancient Germanic branch of the Indo-European language family, while a smaller share is partly derived from Latin and Greek, along with fewer words borrowed from French and Modern English. English, however, is the main source of more recent loanwords.

German is a pluricentric language; the three standardised variants are German, Austrian, and Swiss Standard German. Standard German is sometimes called High German, which refers to its regional origin. German is also notable for its broad spectrum of dialects, with many varieties existing in Europe and other parts of the world. Some of these non-standard varieties have become recognised and protected by regional or national governments.

Since 2004, heads of state of the German-speaking countries have met every year, and the Council for German Orthography has been the main international body regulating German orthography.

== Classification ==
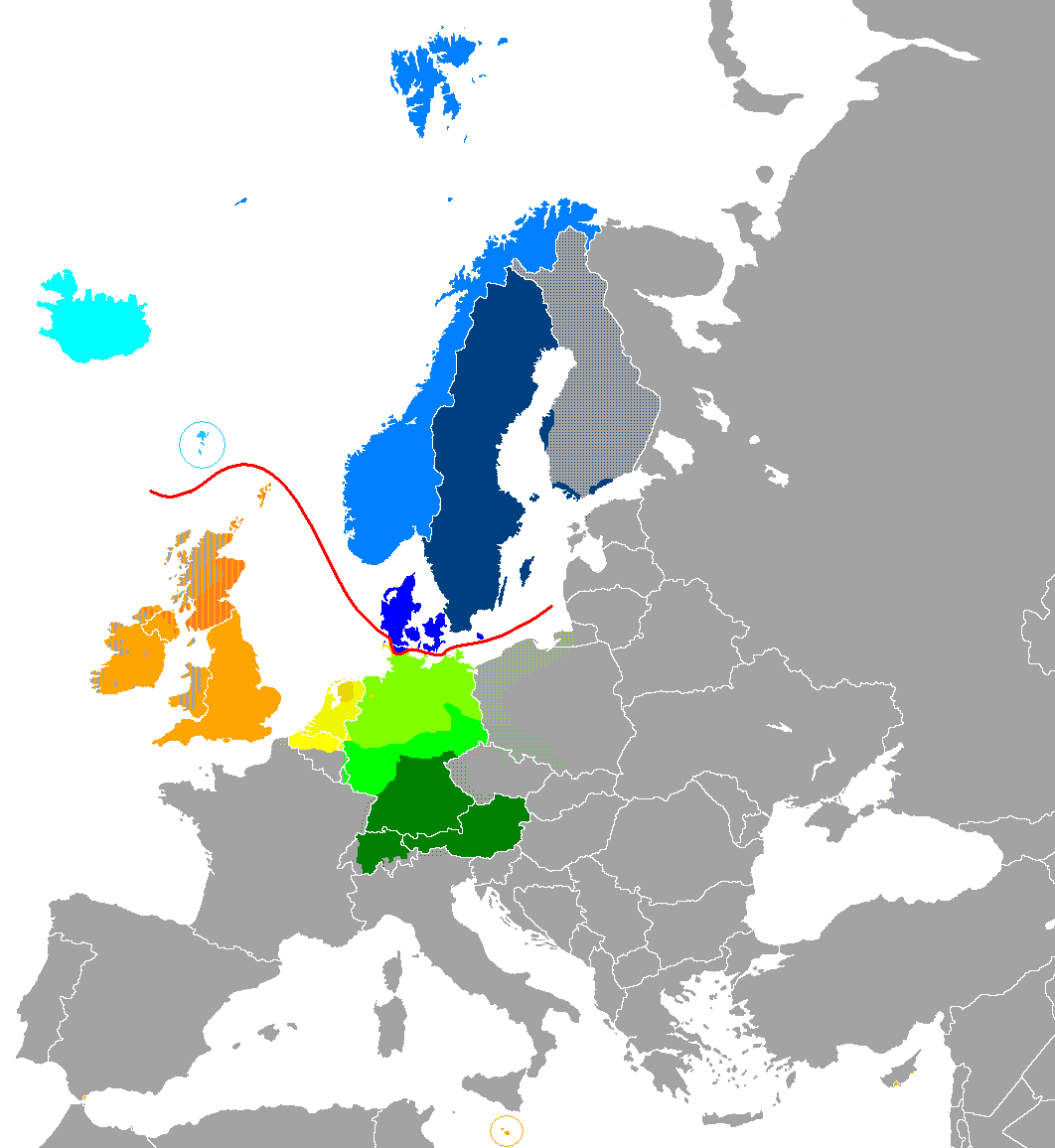
Anglic languages English Scots Anglo-Frisian languages Anglic and Frisian (West, North, Saterland) North Sea Germanic languages Anglo-Frisian and Low German/Low Saxon West Germanic languages North Sea Germanic and Dutch; in Africa: Afrikaans...... German (High): Central; in Lux.: Luxembourgish Upper...... Yiddish

Maurer's classification of German tribes (German)

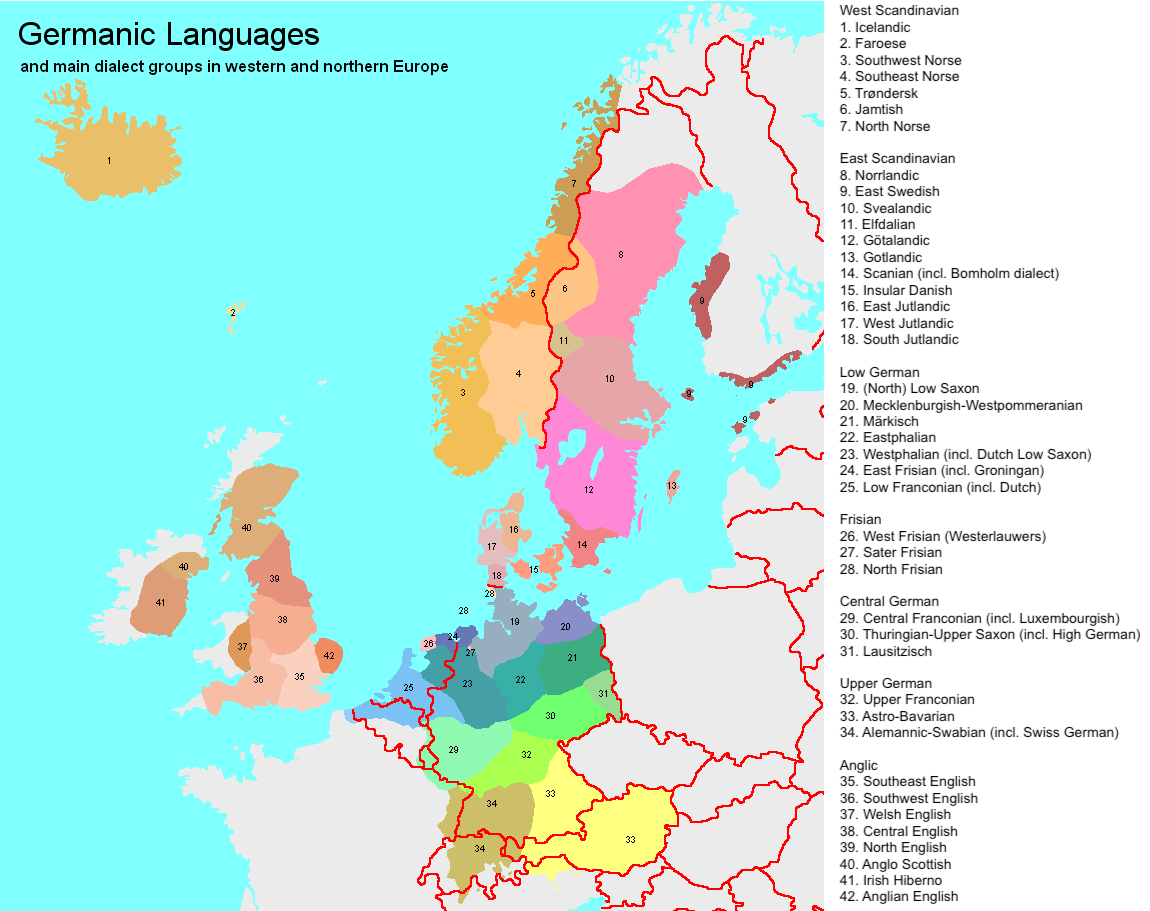
The Germanic languages in contemporary Europe

German is an Indo-European language that belongs to the West Germanic group of the Germanic languages. The Germanic languages are traditionally subdivided into three branches: North Germanic, East Germanic, and West Germanic. The first of these branches survives in modern Danish, Swedish, Norwegian, Faroese, and Icelandic, all of which are descended from Old Norse. The East Germanic languages are now extinct, and Gothic is the only language in this branch which survives in written texts. The West Germanic languages, however, have undergone extensive dialectal subdivision and are now represented in modern languages such as English, German, Dutch, Yiddish, Afrikaans, and others.

Within the West Germanic language dialect continuum, the Benrath and Uerdingen lines (running through Düsseldorf-Benrath and Krefeld-Uerdingen, respectively) serve to distinguish the Germanic dialects that were affected by the High German consonant shift (south of Benrath) from those that were not (north of Uerdingen). A very common example of High German Consonent Shift is the contrast between Standard German machen (to make) and Dutch maken. The constant represented by k in Dutch corresponds to ch in German, that illustrating one outcome of shift. The various regional dialects spoken south of these lines are grouped as High German dialects, while those spoken to the north comprise the Low German and Low Franconian dialects. As members of the West Germanic language family, High German, Low German, and Low Franconian have been proposed to be further distinguished historically as Irminonic, Ingvaeonic, and Istvaeonic, respectively. This classification indicates their historical descent from dialects spoken by the Irminones (also known as the Elbe group), Ingvaeones (or North Sea Germanic group), and Istvaeones (or Weser–Rhine group).

Standard German is based on a combination of Thuringian-Upper Saxon and Upper Franconian dialects, which are Central German and Upper German dialects belonging to the High German dialect group. German is therefore closely related to the other languages based on High German dialects, such as Luxembourgish (based on Central Franconian dialects) and Yiddish. Also closely related to Standard German are the Upper German dialects spoken in the southern German-speaking countries, such as Swiss German (Alemannic dialects) and the various Germanic dialects spoken in the French region of Grand Est, such as Alsatian (mainly Alemannic, but also Central–and Upper Franconian dialects) and Lorraine Franconian (Central Franconian).

After these High German dialects, standard German is less closely related to languages based on Low Franconian dialects (e.g., Dutch and Afrikaans), Low German or Low Saxon dialects (spoken in northern Germany and southern Denmark), neither of which underwent the High German consonant shift. As has been noted, the former of these dialect types is Istvaeonic and the latter Ingvaeonic, whereas the High German dialects are all Irminonic; the differences between these languages and standard German are therefore considerable. Also related to German are the Frisian languages—North Frisian (spoken in Nordfriesland), Saterland Frisian (spoken in Saterland), and West Frisian (spoken in Friesland)—as well as the Anglic languages of English and Scots. These Anglo-Frisian dialects did not take part in the High German consonant shift, and the Anglic languages also adopted much vocabulary from both Old Norse and the Norman language.

== History ==
=== Old High German ===
The history of the German language begins with the High German consonant shift during the Migration Period, which separated Old High German dialects from Old Saxon. This sound shift involved a drastic change in the pronunciation of both voiced and voiceless stop consonants (b, d, g, and p, t, k, respectively). The primary effects of the shift were the following below.

- Voiceless stops became long (geminated) voiceless fricatives following a vowel;
- Voiceless stops became affricates in word-initial position, or following certain consonants;
- Voiced stops became voiceless in certain phonetic settings.

Voiceless stop following a vowel	Word-initial voiceless stop	Voiced stop
/p/→/ff/	/p/→/pf/	/b/→/p/
/t/→/ss/	/t/→/ts/	/d/→/t/
/k/→/xx/	/k/→/kx/	/g/→/k/

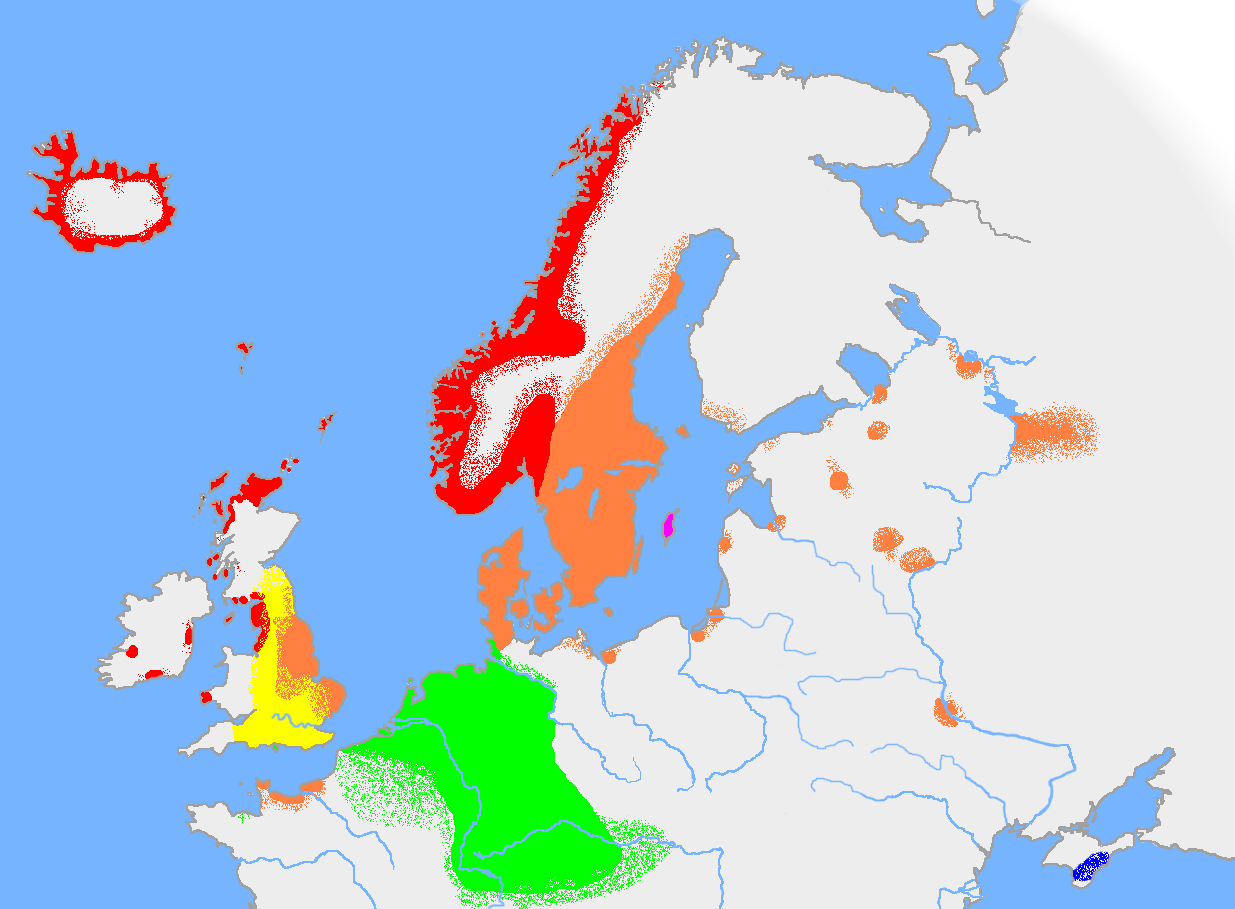
The approximate extent of Germanic languages in the early 10th century: Old West Norse Old East Norse Old Gutnish Old English (West Germanic) Continental West Germanic languages (Old Frisian, Old Saxon, Old Dutch, Old High German). Crimean Gothic (East Germanic)

While there is written evidence of the Old High German language in several Elder Futhark inscriptions from as early as the sixth century AD (such as the Pforzen buckle), the Old High German period is generally seen as beginning with the Abrogans (written c. 765–775), a Latin-German glossary supplying over 3,000 Old High German words with their Latin equivalents. After the Abrogans, the first coherent works written in Old High German appear in the ninth century, chief among them being the Muspilli, Merseburg charms, and Hildebrandslied, and other religious texts (the Georgslied, Ludwigslied, Evangelienbuch, and translated hymns and prayers). The Muspilli is a Christian poem written in a Bavarian dialect offering an account of the soul after the Last Judgment, and the Merseburg charms are transcriptions of spells and charms from the pagan Germanic tradition. Of particular interest to scholars, however, has been the Hildebrandslied, a secular epic poem telling the tale of an estranged father and son unknowingly meeting each other in battle. Linguistically, this text is highly interesting due to the mixed use of Old Saxon and Old High German dialects in its composition. The written works of this period stem mainly from the Alamanni, Bavarian, and Thuringian groups, all belonging to the Elbe Germanic group (Irminones), which had settled in what is now southern-central Germany and Austria between the second and sixth centuries, during the great migration.

In general, the surviving texts of Old High German (OHG) show a wide range of dialectal diversity with very little written uniformity. The early written tradition of OHG survived mostly through monasteries and scriptoria as local translations of Latin originals; as a result, the surviving texts are written in highly disparate regional dialects and exhibit significant Latin influence, particularly in vocabulary. At this point monasteries, where most written works were produced, were dominated by Latin, and German saw only occasional use in official and ecclesiastical writing.

=== Middle High German ===
While there is no complete agreement over the dates of the Middle High German (MHG) period, it is generally seen as lasting from 1050 to 1350. This was a period of significant expansion of the geographical territory occupied by Germanic tribes, and consequently of the number of German speakers. Whereas during the Old High German period the Germanic tribes extended only as far east as the Elbe and Saale rivers, the MHG period saw a number of these tribes expanding beyond this eastern boundary into Slavic territory (known as the Ostsiedlung). With the increasing wealth and geographic spread of the Germanic groups came greater use of German in the courts of nobles as the standard language of official proceedings and literature. A clear example of this is the mittelhochdeutsche Dichtersprache employed in the Hohenstaufen court in Swabia as a standardised supra-dialectal written language. While these efforts were still regionally bound, German began to be used in place of Latin for certain official purposes, leading to a greater need for regularity in written conventions.

While the major changes of the MHG period were socio-cultural, High German was still undergoing significant linguistic changes in syntax, phonetics, and morphology as well (e.g., diphthongisation of certain vowel sounds: hus (OHG & MHG "house")→haus (regionally in later MHG)→Haus (NHG), and weakening of unstressed short vowels to schwa [ə]: taga (OHG "days")→tage (MHG)).

A great wealth of texts survives from the MHG period. Significantly, these texts include a number of impressive secular works, such as the Nibelungenlied, an epic poem telling the story of the dragon-slayer Siegfried (c. thirteenth century), and the Iwein, an Arthurian verse poem by Hartmann von Aue (c. 1203), lyric poems, and courtly romances such as Parzival and Tristan. Also noteworthy is the Sachsenspiegel, the first book of laws written in Middle Low German (c. 1220). The abundance and especially the secular character of the literature of the MHG period demonstrate the beginnings of a standardised written form of German, as well as the desire of poets and authors to be understood by individuals on supra-dialectal terms.

The Middle High German period is generally seen as ending when the 1346–53 Black Death decimated Europe's population.

=== Early New High German ===
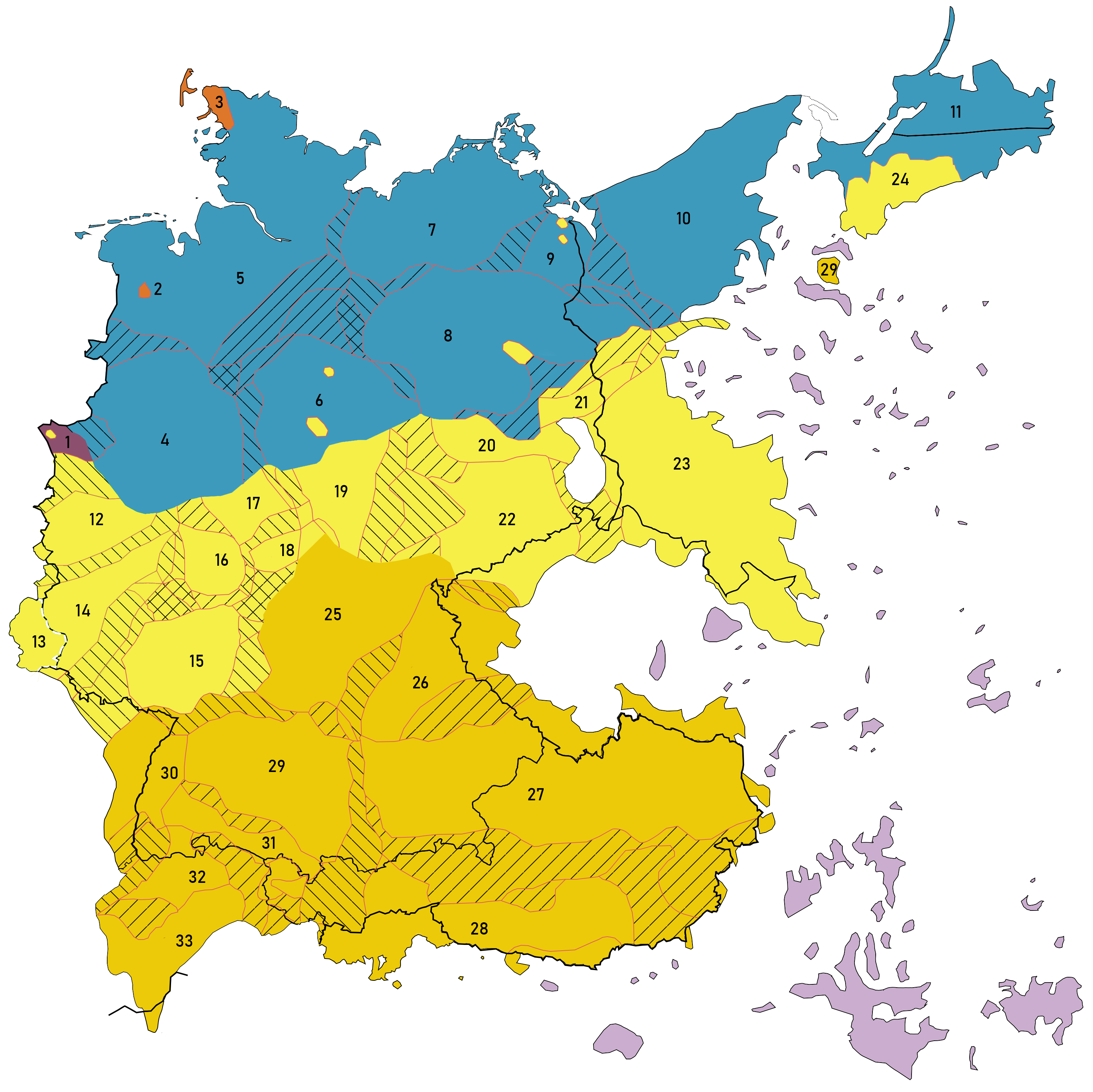
German language area and major dialectal divisions around 1900

Modern High German begins with the Early New High German (ENHG) period, which Wilhelm Scherer dates 1350–1650, terminating with the end of the Thirty Years' War. This period saw the further displacement of Latin by German as the primary language of courtly proceedings and, increasingly, of literature in the German states. While these states were still part of the Holy Roman Empire, and far from any form of unification, the desire for a cohesive written language that would be understandable across the many German-speaking principalities and kingdoms was stronger than ever. As a spoken language German remained highly fractured throughout this period, with a vast number of often mutually incomprehensible regional dialects being spoken throughout the German states; the invention of the printing press c. 1440 and the publication of Luther's vernacular translation of the Bible in 1534, however, had an immense effect on standardising German as a supra-dialectal written language.

The ENHG period saw the rise of several important cross-regional forms of chancery German, one being gemeine tiutsch, used in the court of the Holy Roman Emperor Maximilian I, and the other being Meißner Deutsch, used in the Electorate of Saxony in the Duchy of Saxe-Wittenberg.

Alongside these courtly written standards, the invention of the printing press led to the development of a number of printers' languages (Druckersprachen) aimed at making printed material readable and understandable across as many diverse dialects of German as possible. The greater ease of production and increased availability of written texts brought about increased standardisation in the written form of German.

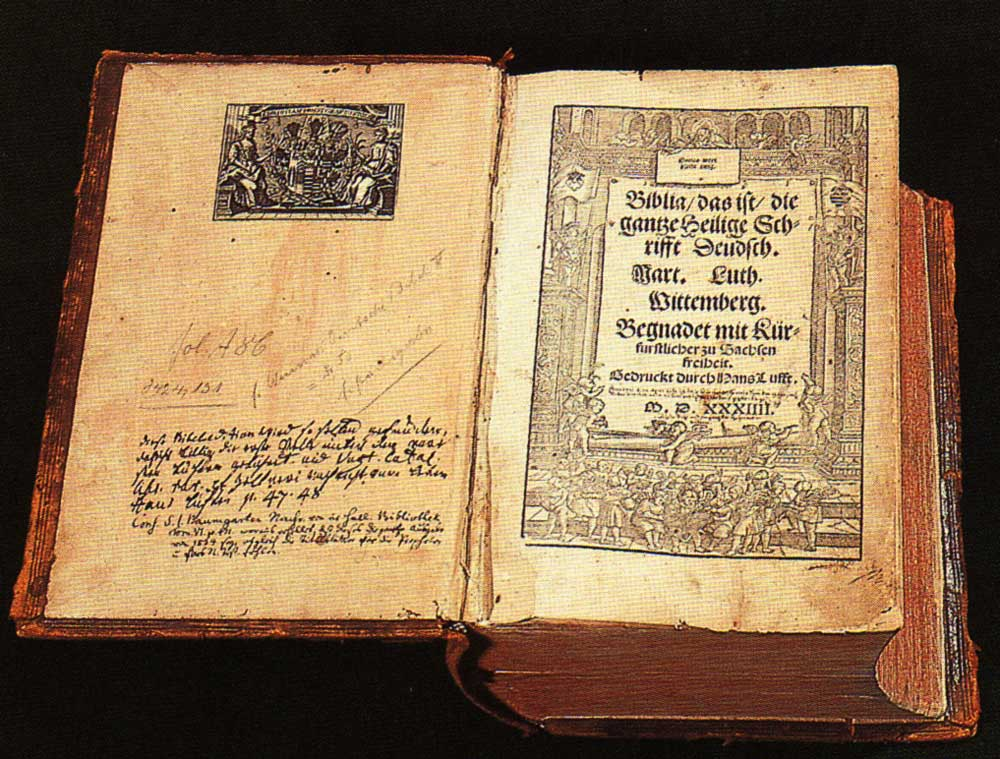
Modern High German translation of the Christian Bible by the Protestant reformer Martin Luther (1534). The widespread popularity of the Bible translated into High German by Luther helped establish modern Standard German.

One of the central events in the development of ENHG was the publication of Luther's translation of the Bible into High German (the New Testament was published in 1522; the Old Testament was published in parts and completed in 1534). Luther based his translation primarily on the Meißner Deutsch of Saxony, spending much time among the population of Saxony researching the dialect so as to make the work as natural and accessible to German speakers as possible. Copies of Luther's Bible featured a long list of glosses for each region, translating words which were unknown in the region into the regional dialect. Luther said the following concerning his translation method:

One who would talk German does not ask the Latin how he shall do it; he must ask the mother in the home, the children on the streets, the common man in the market-place and note carefully how they talk, then translate accordingly. They will then understand what is said to them because it is German. When Christ says 'ex abundantia cordis os loquitur,' I would translate, if I followed the papists, aus dem Überflusz des Herzens redet der Mund. But tell me is this talking German? What German understands such stuff? No, the mother in the home and the plain man would say, Wesz das Herz voll ist, des gehet der Mund über.

Luther's translation of the Bible into High German was also decisive for the German language and its evolution from Early New High German to modern Standard German. The publication of Luther's Bible was a decisive moment in the spread of literacy in early modern Germany, and promoted the development of non-local forms of language and exposed all speakers to forms of German from outside their own area. With Luther's rendering of the Bible in the vernacular, German asserted itself against the dominance of Latin as a legitimate language for courtly, literary, and now ecclesiastical subject-matter. His Bible was ubiquitous in the German states: nearly every household possessed a copy. Nevertheless, even with the influence of Luther's Bible as an unofficial written standard, a widely accepted standard for written German did not appear until the middle of the eighteenth century.

=== Habsburg Empire ===
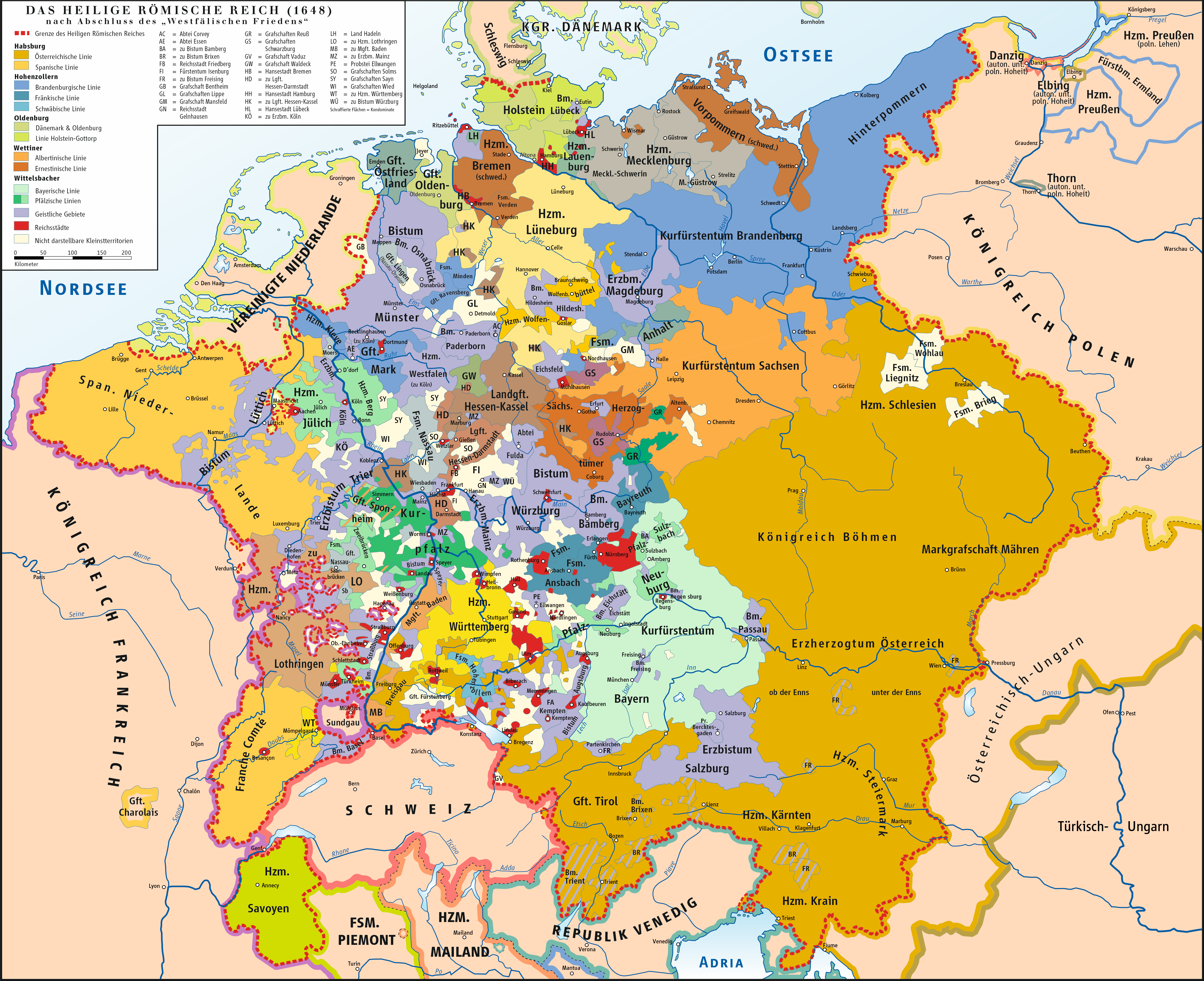
Map of Central Europe in 1648: Territories under the Holy Roman Empire, comprising the Alpine heartland (Erblande) of the Habsburg monarchy.

Ethnolinguistic map comprising the territories of Austria-Hungary (1910), with German-speaking areas shown in red

German was the language of commerce and government in the Habsburg Empire, which encompassed a large area of Central and Eastern Europe. Until the mid-nineteenth century, it was essentially the language of townspeople throughout most of the Empire. Its use indicated that the speaker was a merchant or someone from an urban area, regardless of nationality.

Prague (German: Prag) and Budapest (Buda, German: Ofen), to name two examples, were gradually Germanised in the years after their incorporation into the Habsburg domain. However, Prague had a large German-speaking population since the Middle Ages, as had Pressburg (Pozsony, now Bratislava), which was settled by Germans in the 10th century. Significant portions of Bohemia and Moravia, now part of the Czech Republic, had become German-speaking during Ostsiedlung. During the Habsburg time, Budapest and cities like Zagreb (German: Agram) or Ljubljana (German: Laibach), contained significant German minorities.

In the eastern provinces of Banat, Bukovina, and Transylvania (German: Banat, Buchenland, Siebenbürgen), German was the predominant language not only in the larger towns—like Temeschburg (Timișoara), Hermannstadt (Sibiu), and Kronstadt (Brașov)—but also in many smaller localities in the surrounding areas.

=== Standardisation ===
In 1901, the Second Orthographic Conference ended with a (nearly) complete standardisation of the Standard German language in its written form, and the Duden Handbook was declared its standard definition. Punctuation and compound spelling (joined or isolated compounds) were not standardised in the process.

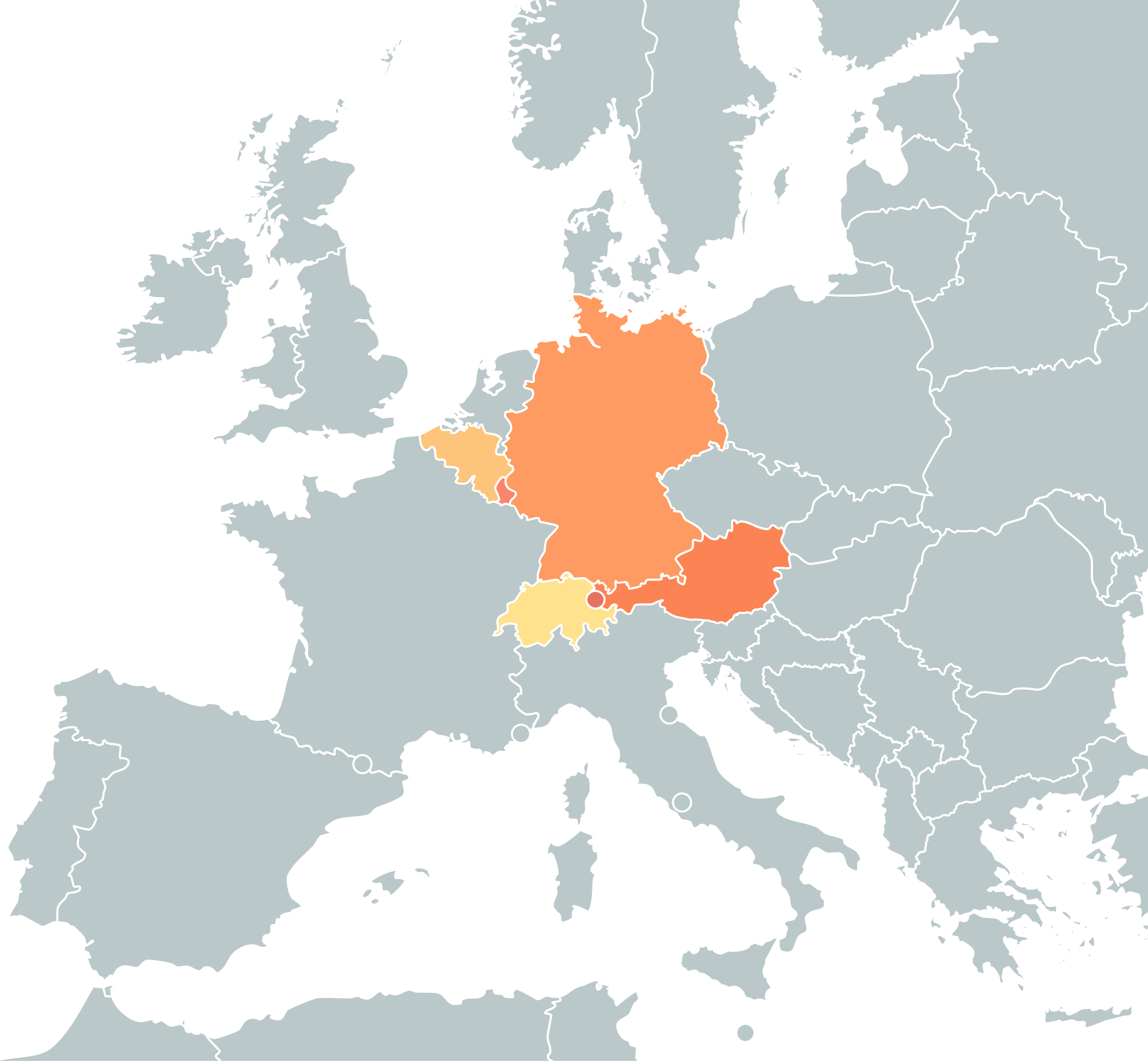
Participants of Meetings of German-speaking countries (2004–present)

The Deutsche Bühnensprache (lit. 'German stage language') by Theodor Siebs had established conventions for German pronunciation in theatres, three years earlier; however, this was an artificial standard that did not correspond to any traditional spoken dialect. Rather, it was based on the pronunciation of German in Northern Germany, although it was subsequently regarded often as a general prescriptive norm, despite differing pronunciation traditions especially in the Upper-German-speaking regions that still characterise the dialect of the area today – especially the pronunciation of the ending -ig as [ɪk] instead of [ɪç]. In Northern Germany, High German was a foreign language to most inhabitants, whose native dialects were subsets of Low German. It was usually encountered only in writing or formal speech; in fact, most of High German was a written language, not identical to any spoken dialect, throughout the German-speaking area until well into the 19th century. However, wider standardisation of pronunciation was established on the basis of public speaking in theatres and the media during the 20th century and documented in pronouncing dictionaries.

Official revisions of some of the rules from 1901 were not issued until the controversial German orthography reform of 1996 was made the official standard by governments of all German-speaking countries. Media and written works are now almost all produced in Standard German which is understood in all areas where German is spoken.

== Geographical distribution ==
German diaspora

Approximate distribution of native German speakers (assuming a rounded total of 95 million) worldwide:
1. Germany (78.3%)
2. Austria (8.40%)
3. Switzerland (5.60%)
4. Brazil (3.20%)
5. Italy (South Tyrol) (0.40%)
6. Other (4.10%)

As a result of the German diaspora, as well as the popularity of German taught as a foreign language, the geographical distribution of German speakers (or "Germanophones") spans all inhabited continents.

However, establishing an exact, global number of native German speakers is complicated by the existence of several varieties whose status as separate "languages" or "dialects" is disputed for political and linguistic reasons, including quantitatively strong varieties like certain forms of Alemannic and Low German. With the inclusion or exclusion of certain varieties, it is estimated that approximately 90–95 million people speak German as a first language, 10–25 million speak it as a second language, and 75–100 million as a foreign language. This would imply the existence of approximately 175–220 million German speakers worldwide.

German sociolinguist Ulrich Ammon estimated a number of 289 million German foreign language speakers without clarifying the criteria by which he classified a speaker.

=== Europe ===
The German language in Europe: German Sprachraum: German is the official language (de jure or de facto) and first language of the majority of the population German is a co-official language but not the first language of the majority of the population German (or a German dialect) is a legally recognised minority language (squares: geographic distribution too dispersed/small for map scale) German (or a variety of German) is spoken by a sizeable minority but has no legal recognition

Most of Austria lies in the Bavarian dialect area; only the very west of the country is Alemannic-speaking. Map shows Austria and South Tyrol, Italy.

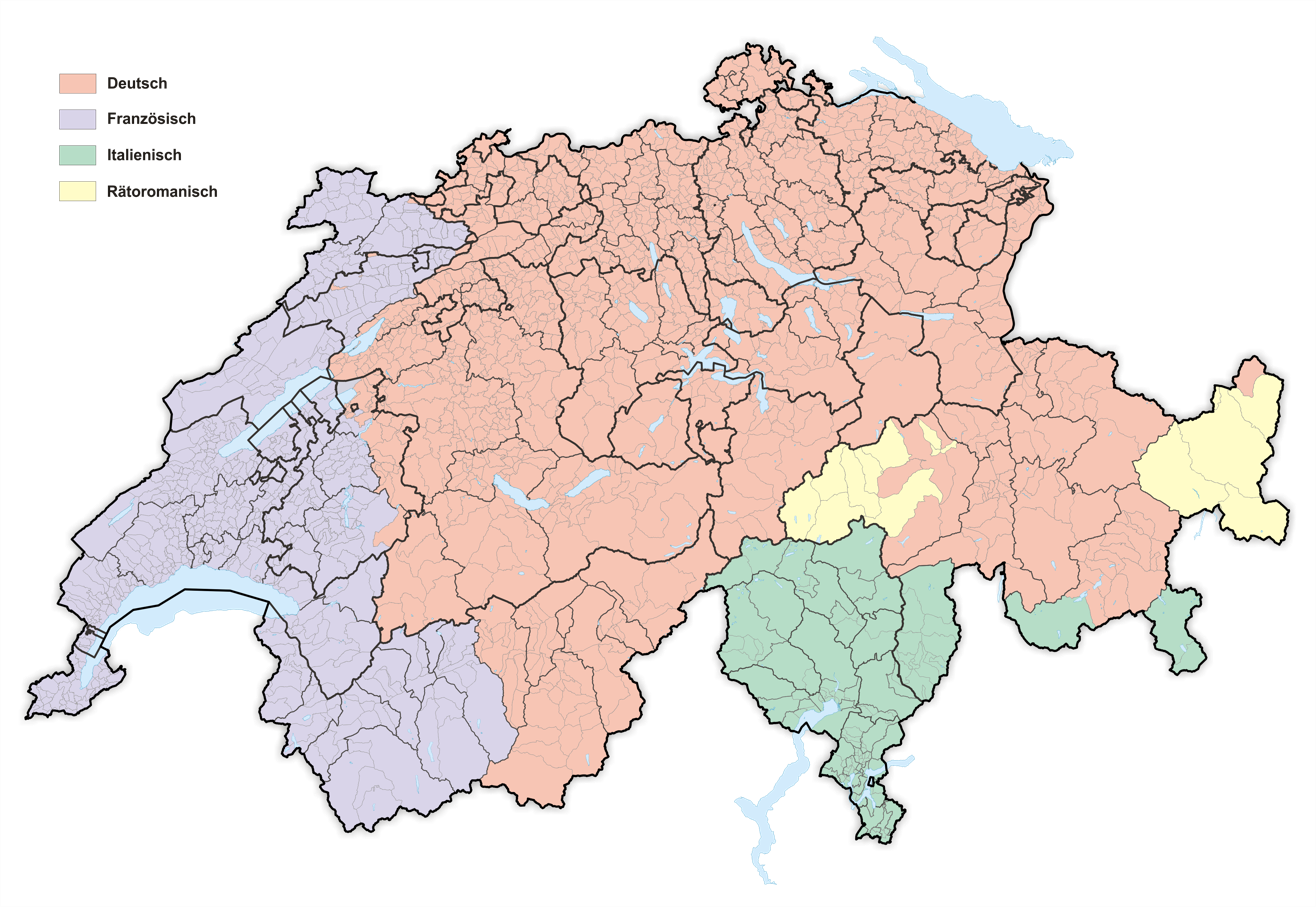
(Swiss) German is one of the four national languages of Switzerland.

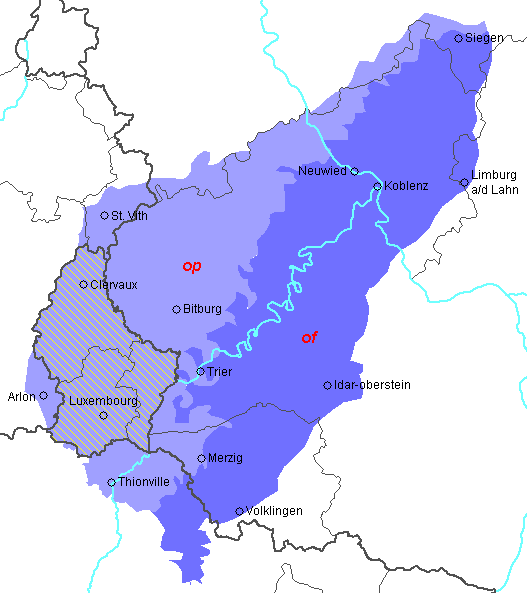
Luxembourg lies in the Moselle Franconian dialect area.

In Belgium, German is spoken in the country's German-speaking Community, in the very east of the country.

As of 2012, about 90 million people, or 16% of the European Union's population, spoke German as their mother tongue, making it the second most widely spoken language on the continent after Russian and the second biggest language in terms of overall speakers (after English), as well as the most spoken native language.

==== German Sprachraum ====
The area in central Europe where the majority of the population speaks German as a first language and has German as a (co-)official language is called the "German Sprachraum". German is the official language of the following countries:

- Germany
- Austria
- 17 cantons of Switzerland
- Liechtenstein

As a result of implementation of the Oder–Neisse line and ensuing expulsion and ethnic cleansing in post-war Poland, the German Sprachraum significantly shrank, as well as by dissolution of the large German-speaking areas in Bohemia and Moravia. Former German-speaking exclaves of East Prussia, the Free City of Danzig and the Memelland ceased to exist, while Francization in Alsace and Lorraine removed use of German in these areas.

German is a co-official language of the following countries:

- Belgium (as majority language only in the German-speaking Community, which represents 0.7% of the Belgian population)
- Luxembourg, along with French and Luxembourgish
- Switzerland, co-official at the federal level with French, Italian, and Romansh, and at the local level in four cantons: Bern (with French), Fribourg (with French), Grisons (with Italian and Romansh) and Valais (with French)
- Italy, (as majority language only in the Autonomous Province of South Tyrol, which represents 0.6% of the Italian population)

==== Outside the German Sprachraum ====
Although expulsions and (forced) assimilation after the two World wars greatly diminished them, minority communities of mostly bilingual German native speakers exist in areas both adjacent to and detached from the Sprachraum.

Within Europe, German is a recognised minority language in the following countries:

- Czech Republic (see also: Germans in the Czech Republic)
- Denmark (see also: North Schleswig Germans)
- Hungary (see also: Germans of Hungary)
- Poland (see also German minority in Poland; German is an auxiliary and co-official language in 31 communes)
- Romania (see also: Germans of Romania)
- Russia (see also: Germans in Russia)
- Slovakia (see also: Carpathian Germans)

In France, the High German varieties of Alsatian and Moselle Franconian are identified as "regional languages", but the European Charter for Regional or Minority Languages of 1998 has not yet been ratified by the government.

In the Baltic states of Estonia, Latvia, and Lithuania, there are still around 8,000 members of the German minority (Baltic Germans, East Prussians, and Russian Germans) who speak Standard German and, to some extent, Low German. For Estonia, the number is estimated quite precisely at under 2,000 (in 2000: 1,870), for Latvia at just over 3,000 (in 2004: 3,311), and also for Lithuania at just over 3,000.

In 2010, 394,000 Germans lived in Russia, some of whom spoke German. After the collapse of the Soviet Union, many Russian Germans immigrated to Germany.

=== Africa ===
==== Namibia ====
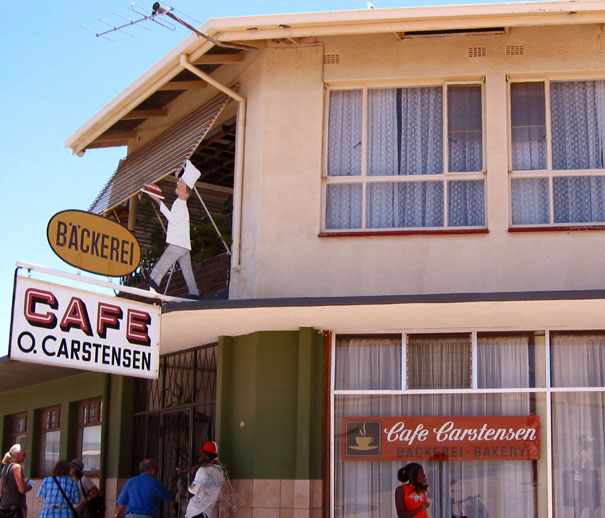
Bilingual German-English sign at a bakery in Namibia, where German is a national language

Namibia also was a colony of the German Empire, from 1884 to 1915. About 30,000 people still speak German as a native tongue today, mostly descendants of German colonial settlers. The period of German colonialism in Namibia also led to the evolution of a Standard German-based pidgin language called "Namibian Black German", which became a second language for parts of the indigenous population. Although it is nearly extinct today, some older Namibians still have some knowledge of it.

German remained a de facto official language of Namibia after the end of German colonial rule alongside English and Afrikaans, and had de jure co-official status from 1984 until its independence from South Africa in 1990. However, the Namibian government perceived Afrikaans and German as symbols of apartheid and colonialism, and decided English would be the sole official language upon independence, stating that it was a "neutral" language as there were virtually no English native speakers in Namibia at that time. German, Afrikaans, and several indigenous languages thus became "national languages" by law, identifying them as elements of the cultural heritage of the nation and ensuring that the state acknowledged and supported their presence in the country.

Today, Namibia is considered to be the only German-speaking country outside of the Sprachraum in Europe. German is used in a wide variety of spheres throughout the country, especially in business, tourism, and public signage, as well as in education, churches (most notably the German-speaking Evangelical Lutheran Church in Namibia (GELK)), other cultural spheres such as music, and media (such as German language radio programs by the Namibian Broadcasting Corporation). The Allgemeine Zeitung is one of the three biggest newspapers in Namibia and the only German-language daily in Africa.

==== Rest of Africa ====
An estimated 12,000 people speak German or a German variety as a first language in South Africa, mostly originating from different waves of immigration during the 19th and 20th centuries. One of the largest communities consists of the speakers of "Nataler Deutsch", a variety of Low German concentrated in and around Wartburg. The South African constitution identifies German as a "commonly used" language and the Pan South African Language Board is obligated to promote and ensure respect for it.

Cameroon was also a colony of the German Empire from the same period (1884 to 1916). However, German was replaced by French and English, the languages of the two successor colonial powers, after its loss in World War I. Nevertheless, since the 21st century, German has become a popular foreign language among pupils and students, with 300,000 people learning or speaking German in Cameroon in 2010 and over 230,000 in 2020. Today Cameroon is one of the African countries outside Namibia with the highest number of people learning German.

=== North America ===
In the United States, German is the fifth most spoken language in terms of native and second language speakers after English, Spanish, French, and Chinese (with figures for Cantonese and Mandarin combined), with over 1 million total speakers. In the states of North Dakota and South Dakota, German is the most common language spoken at home after English. As a legacy of significant German immigration to the country, German geographical names can be found throughout the Midwest region, such as New Ulm and Bismarck (North Dakota's state capital), plus many other regions.

A number of German varieties have developed in the country and are still spoken today, such as Pennsylvania Dutch and Texas German.

=== South America ===
In Brazil, the largest concentrations of German speakers are in the states of Rio Grande do Sul (where Riograndenser Hunsrückisch developed), Santa Catarina, and Espírito Santo.

Standard German is a recognised language in the Brazilian municipalities of Pomerode and São João do Oeste.

Meanwhile, German dialects (namely Hunsrik and East Pomeranian) are recognised languages in the following municipalities in Brazil:

- Espírito Santo (statewide cultural language): Domingos Martins, Laranja da Terra, Pancas, Santa Maria de Jetibá, Vila Pavão
- Rio Grande do Sul (Riograndenser Hunsrückisch German is a designated cultural language in the state): Santa Maria do Herval, Canguçu
- Santa Catarina: Antônio Carlos

In Chile, during the 19th and 20th centuries, there was a massive immigration of Germans, Swiss and Austrians. Because of that, two dialects of German emerged, Lagunen-Deutsch and Chiloten-Deutsch. Immigrants even founded prosperous cities and towns. The impact of nineteenth century German immigration to southern Chile was such that Valdivia was for a while a Spanish-German bilingual city with "German signboards and placards alongside the Spanish". Currently, German and its dialects are spoken in many cities, towns and rural areas of southern Chile, such as Valdivia, Osorno, Puerto Montt, Puerto Varas, Frutillar, Nueva Braunau, Castro, Ancud, among many others.

Small concentrations of German-speakers and their descendants are also found in Argentina, Chile, Paraguay, Venezuela, and Bolivia.

=== Oceania ===
In Australia, the state of South Australia experienced a pronounced wave of Prussian immigration in the 1840s (particularly from Silesia region). With the prolonged isolation from other German speakers and contact with Australian English, a unique dialect known as Barossa German developed, spoken predominantly in the Barossa Valley near Adelaide. Usage of German sharply declined with the advent of World War I, due to the prevailing anti-German sentiment in the population and related government action. It continued to be used as a first language into the 20th century, but its use is now limited to a few older speakers.

As of the 2013 census, 36,642 people in New Zealand spoke German, mostly descendants of a small wave of 19th century German immigrants, making it the third most spoken European language after English and French and overall the ninth most spoken language.

A German creole named Unserdeutsch was historically spoken in the former German colony of German New Guinea, modern day Papua New Guinea. It is at a high risk of extinction, with only about 100 speakers remaining, and a topic of interest among linguists seeking to revive interest in the language.

=== As a foreign language ===
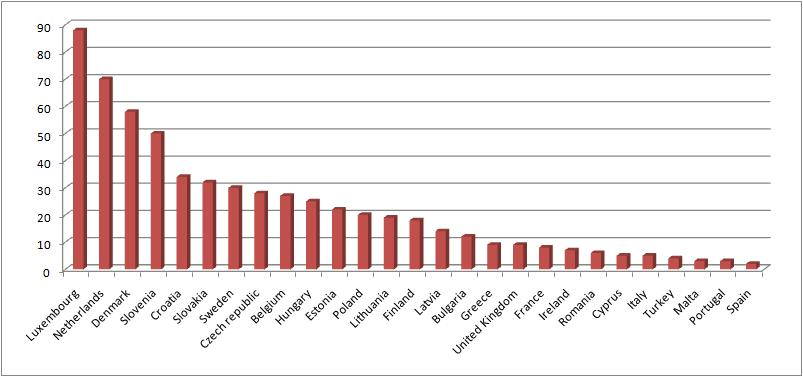
Self-reported knowledge of German as a foreign language in the EU member states (+Turkey and UK), in per cent of the adult population (+15), 2005

Like English, French, and Spanish, German has become a standard foreign language throughout the world, especially in the Western World. German ranks second on par with French among the best known foreign languages in the European Union (EU) after English, as well as in Russia, and Turkey. In terms of student numbers across all levels of education, German ranks third in the EU (after English and French) and in the United States (after Spanish and French). In British schools, where learning a foreign language is not mandatory, a dramatic decline in entries for German A-Level and GCSE has been observed. In 2020, approximately 15.4 million people were enrolled in learning German across all levels of education worldwide. This number has decreased from a peak of 20.1 million in 2000. Within the EU, not counting countries where it is an official language, German as a foreign language is most popular in Eastern and Northern Europe, namely the Czech Republic, Croatia, Denmark, Greece, Hungary, the Netherlands, Norway, Poland, Slovakia, Slovenia, Bosnia and Herzegovina, and Serbia. German was once, and to some extent still is, a lingua franca in those parts of Europe.

=== German-language media worldwide ===
A visible sign of the geographical extension of the German language is the German-language media outside the German-speaking countries. German is the second most commonly used scientific language as well as the third most widely used language on websites after English and Spanish.

Deutsche Welle (German pronunciation: [ˈdɔʏtʃə ˈvɛlə]; "German Wave" in German), or DW, is Germany's public international broadcaster. The service is available in 30 languages. DW's satellite television service consists of channels in German, English, Spanish, and Arabic.

See also:

- List of newspapers in Germany and List of German-language newspapers published in the United States
- List of magazines in Germany
- List of television stations in Germany and List of German-language television channels
- List of radio stations in Germany and List of German-language radio stations
- Goethe-Institut [ˈɡøːtə ʔɪnstiˌtuːt] (a non-profit German cultural association operational worldwide with 159 institutes, promoting the study of the German language abroad and encouraging international cultural exchange and relations.)

== Standard German ==
Self-reported knowledge of German within the nations of the European Union

The basis of Standard German developed with the Luther Bible and the chancery language spoken by the Saxon court, part of the regional High German group. However, there are places where the traditional regional dialects have been replaced by new vernaculars based on Standard German, which is the case in large stretches of Northern Germany but also in major cities in other parts of the country. However, the remains that the colloquial Standard German differs from the formal written language, especially in grammar and syntax, in which it has been influenced by dialectal speech.

Standard German differs regionally among German-speaking countries in vocabulary and some instances of pronunciation and even grammar and orthography. This variation must not be confused with the variation of local dialects. Even though the national varieties of Standard German are only somewhat influenced by the local dialects, they are very distinct. German is thus considered a pluricentric language, with currently three national standard varieties of German: German Standard German, Austrian Standard German and Swiss Standard German. In comparison to other European languages (e.g., Portuguese, English), the multi-standard character of German is still not widely acknowledged. However, 90% of Austrian secondary school teachers of German consider German as having "more than one" standard variety. In this context, some scholars speak of a One Standard German Axiom that has been maintained as a core assumption of German dialectology.

In most regions, the speakers use a continuum, e.g., "Umgangssprache" (colloquial standards) from more dialectal varieties to more standard varieties depending on the circumstances.

=== Varieties ===
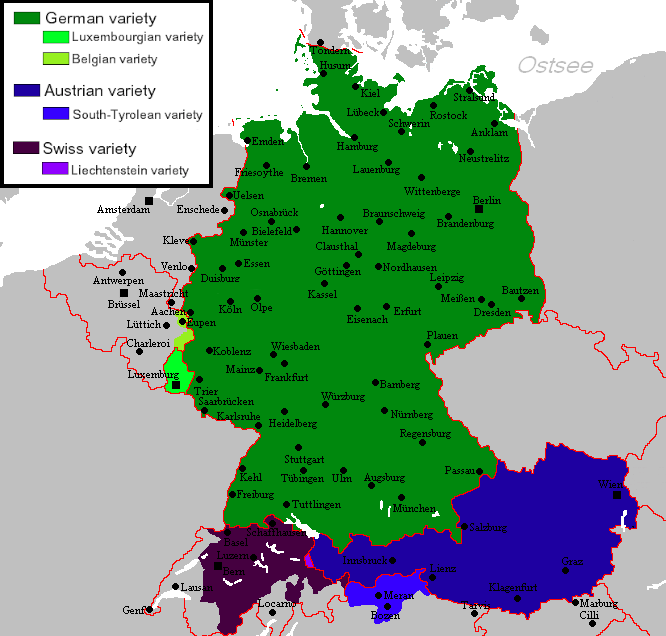
The national and regional standard varieties of German

In German linguistics, German dialects are distinguished from varieties of Standard German. The varieties of Standard German refer to the different local varieties of the pluricentric German. They differ mainly in lexicon and phonology, but also smaller grammatical differences. In certain regions, they have replaced the traditional German dialects, especially in Northern Germany.

- German Standard German
- Austrian Standard German
- Swiss Standard German

In the German-speaking parts of Switzerland, mixtures of dialect and standard are very seldom used, and the use of Standard German is largely restricted to the written language. About 11% of Swiss residents speak Standard German at home, but this is mainly due to German immigrants. This situation has been called a medial diglossia. Swiss Standard German is used in the Swiss education system, while Austrian German is officially used in the Austrian education system.

== Dialects ==
The German dialects are the traditional local varieties of the language; many of them are not mutually intelligible with standard German, and they have great differences in lexicon, phonology, and syntax. If a narrow definition of language based on mutual intelligibility is used, many German dialects are considered to be separate languages (for instance by ISO 639-3). However, such a point of view is unusual in German linguistics.

The German dialect continuum is traditionally divided most broadly into High German and Low German (also called "Low Saxon"). However, historically, High German dialects and Low Saxon/Low German dialects do not belong to the same language. Nevertheless, in today's Germany, Low Saxon/Low German is often perceived as a dialectal variation of Standard German on a functional level even by many native speakers.

The variation among the German dialects is considerable, with often only neighbouring dialects being mutually intelligible. Some dialects are not intelligible to people who know only Standard German. However, all German dialects belong to the dialect continuum of High German and Low Saxon.

=== Low German ===
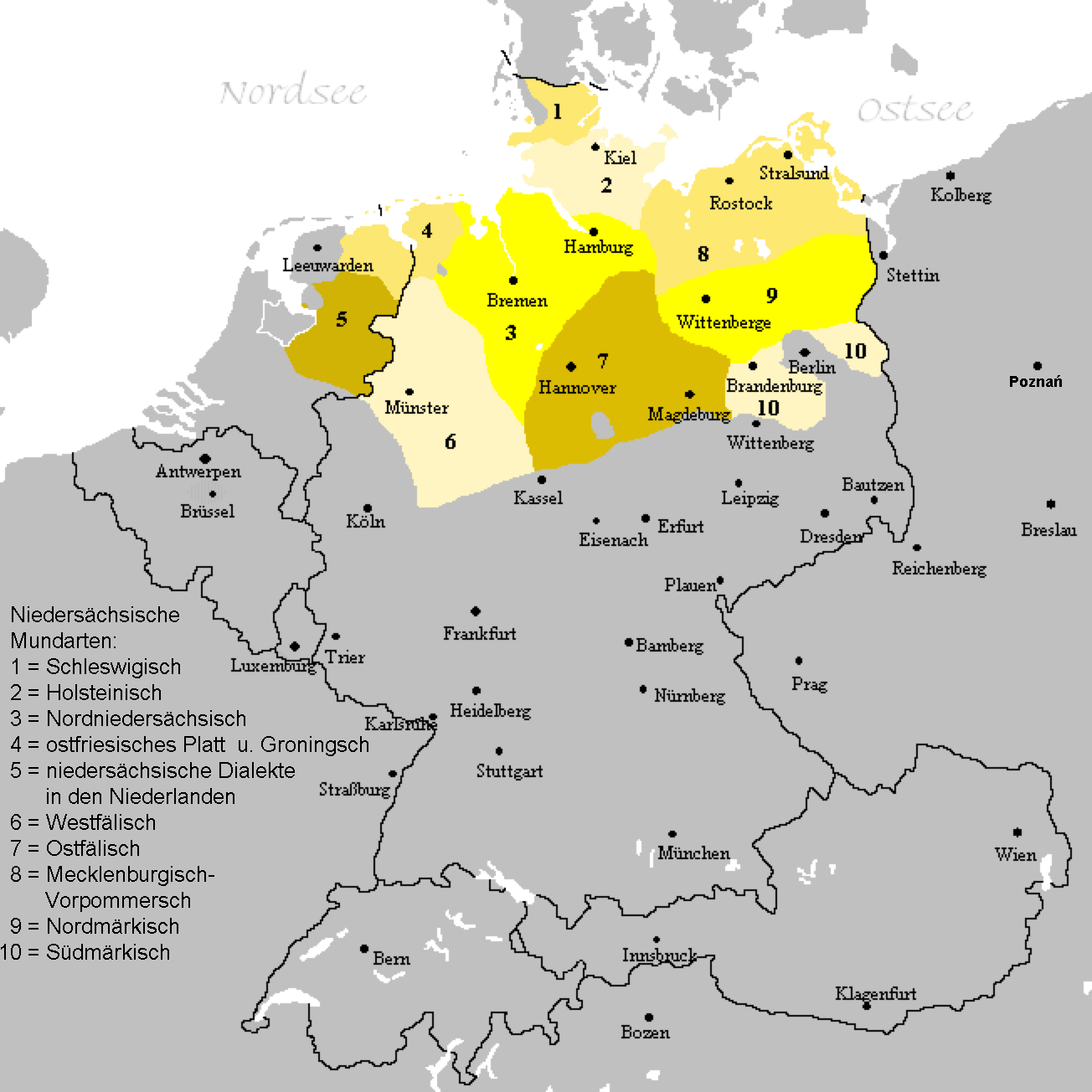
The Low German dialects

Middle Low German was the lingua franca of the Hanseatic League. It was the predominant language in Northern Germany until the 16th century. In 1534, the Luther Bible was published. It aimed to be understandable to a broad audience and was based mainly on Central and Upper German varieties. The Early New High German language gained more prestige than Low German and became the language of science and literature. Around the same time, the Hanseatic League, a confederation of northern ports, lost its importance as new trade routes to Asia and the Americas were established, and the most powerful German states of that period were located in Middle and Southern Germany.

The 18th and 19th centuries were marked by mass education in Standard German in schools. Gradually, Low German came to be politically viewed as a mere dialect spoken by the uneducated. The proportion of the population who can understand and speak it has decreased continuously since World War II.

=== Low Franconian ===
The Low Franconian dialects fall within a linguistic category used to classify a number of historical and contemporary West Germanic varieties most closely related to, and including, the Dutch language. Consequently, the vast majority of the Low Franconian dialects are spoken outside of the German language area. Low Franconian dialects are spoken in the Netherlands, Belgium, South Africa, Namibia, and Suriname, and along the Lower Rhine in Germany, in North Rhine-Westphalia. The region in Germany encompasses parts of the Rhine-Ruhr metropolitan region.

The Low Franconian dialects have three different standard varieties: In the Netherlands, Belgium and Suriname, it is Dutch, which is itself a Low Franconian language. In South Africa, it is Afrikaans, which is also categorised as Low Franconian. During the Middle Ages and Early Modern Period, the Low Franconian dialects now spoken in Germany, used Middle Dutch or Early Modern Dutch as their literary language and Dachsprache. Following a 19th-century change in Prussian language policy, use of Dutch as an official and public language was forbidden; resulting in Standard German taking its place as the region's official language. As a result, these dialects are now considered German dialects from a socio-linguistic point of view.

The Low Franconian dialects in Germany are divided by the Uerdingen line (north of which the word for "I" is pronounced as "ik" and south of which as "ich") into northern and southern Low Franconian. The northern variants comprise Kleverlandish, which is most similar to Standard Dutch. The other ones are transitional between Low Franconian and Ripuarian, but closer to Low Franconian.

=== High German ===
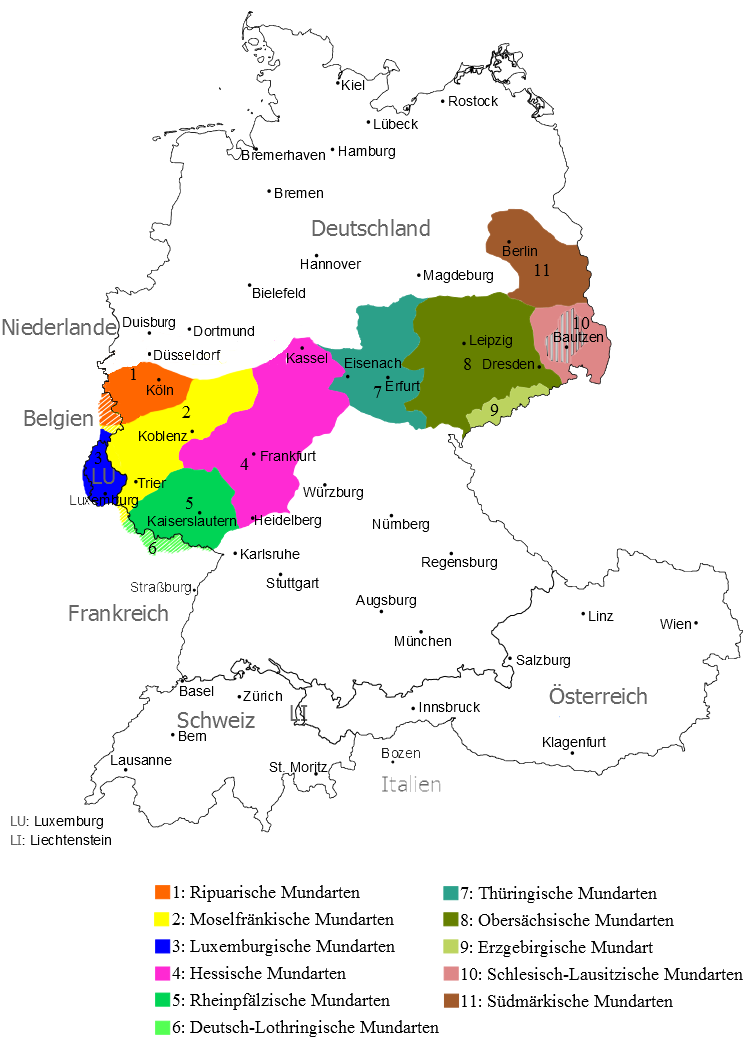
The Central German dialects

The High German dialects consist of the Central German, High Franconian and Upper German dialects. The High Franconian dialects are transitional dialects between Central and Upper German. The High German varieties spoken by the Ashkenazi Jews have several unique features and are considered as a separate language, Yiddish, written with the Hebrew alphabet.

==== Central German ====
The Central German dialects are spoken in Central Germany, from Aachen in the west to Görlitz in the east. Modern Standard German is mostly based on Central German dialects.

===== West Central German =====
The West Central German dialects are the Central Franconian dialects (Ripuarian and Moselle Franconian) and the Rhenish Franconian dialects (Hessian and Palatine). These dialects are considered as

- German in Germany and Belgium
- Luxembourgish in Luxembourg
- Lorraine Franconian in Moselle, France
- Alsatian (in a Rhenish Franconian variant) in Alsace bossue, France
- Limburgish or Kerkrade dialect in the Netherlands.
- Transylvanian Saxon in Transylvania, Romania (considered a variant of German)
- Banat Swabian in Banat, Romania (considered a variant of German)

Luxembourgish as well as Transylvanian Saxon and Banat Swabian are based on Moselle Franconian dialects.

===== East Central German =====
Further east, the non-Franconian, East Central German dialects are spoken (Thuringian, Upper Saxon, Erzgebirgisch (dialect of the Ore Mountains) and North Upper Saxon–South Markish, and earlier, in the then German-speaking parts of Silesia also Silesian, and in then German southern East Prussia also High Prussian).

==== High Franconian ====
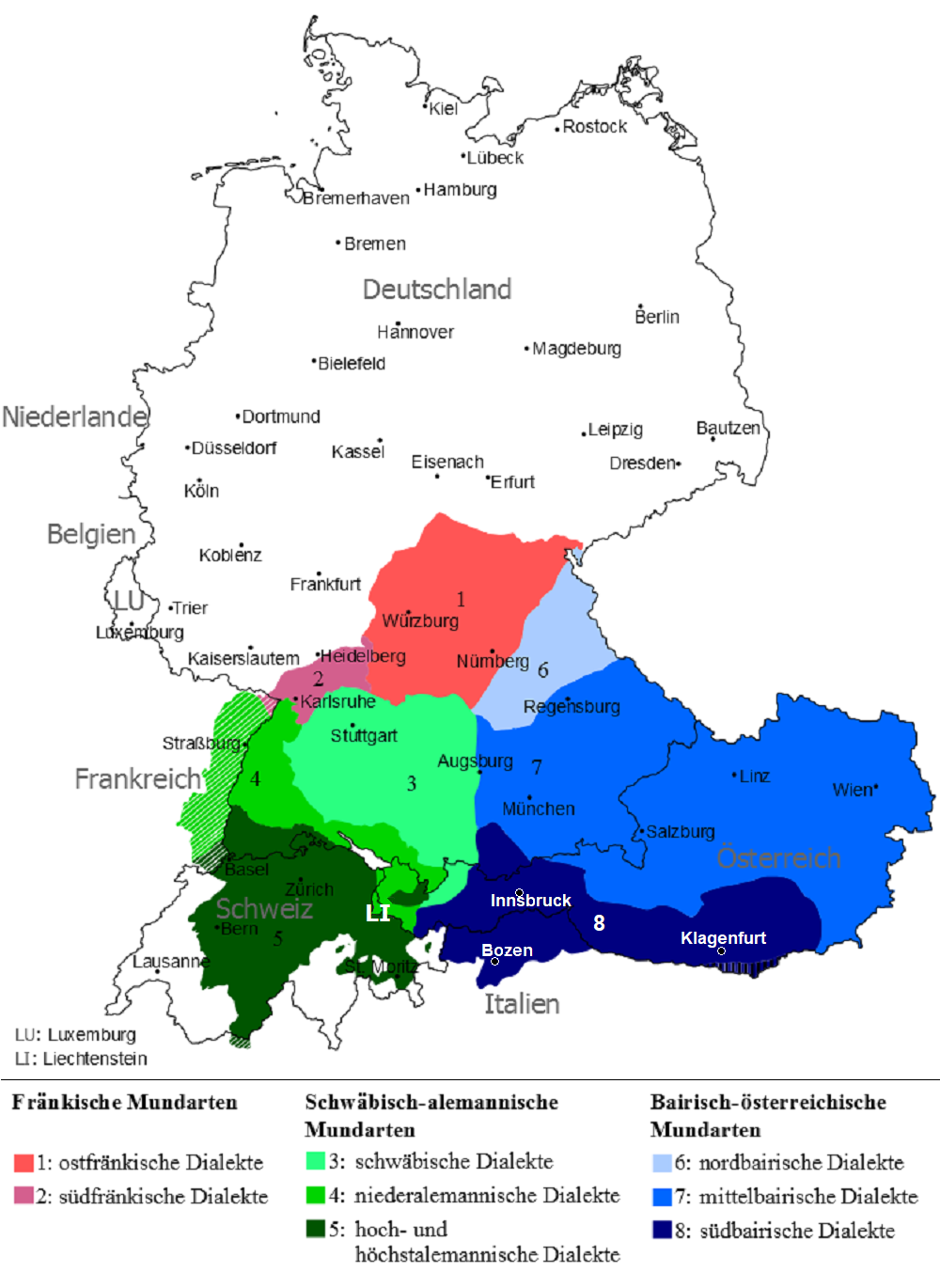
The Upper German and High Franconian (transitional between Central and Upper German)

The High Franconian dialects are transitional dialects between Central and Upper German. They consist of the East and South Franconian dialects.

===== East Franconian =====
The East Franconian dialects are spoken in the region of Franconia. Franconia consists of the Bavarian districts of Upper, Middle, and Lower Franconia, the region of South Thuringia (those parts of Thuringia south of the Thuringian Forest), and the eastern parts of the region of Heilbronn-Franken (Tauber Franconia and Hohenlohe) in northeastern Baden-Württemberg. East Franconian is also spoken in most parts of Saxon Vogtland (in the Vogtland District around Plauen, Reichenbach im Vogtland, Auerbach/Vogtl., Oelsnitz/Vogtl. and Klingenthal). East Franconian is colloquially referred to as "Fränkisch" (Franconian) in Franconia (including Bavarian Vogtland), and as "Vogtländisch" (Vogtlandian) in Saxon Vogtland.

===== South Franconian =====
South Franconian is spoken in northern Baden-Württemberg and in the northeasternmost tip of Alsace (around Wissembourg) in France. In Baden-Württemberg, they are considered dialects of German, and in Alsace a South Franconian variant of Alsatian.

==== Upper German ====
The Upper German dialects are the Alemannic and Swabian dialects in the west and the Austro-Bavarian dialects in the east.

===== Alemannic and Swabian =====
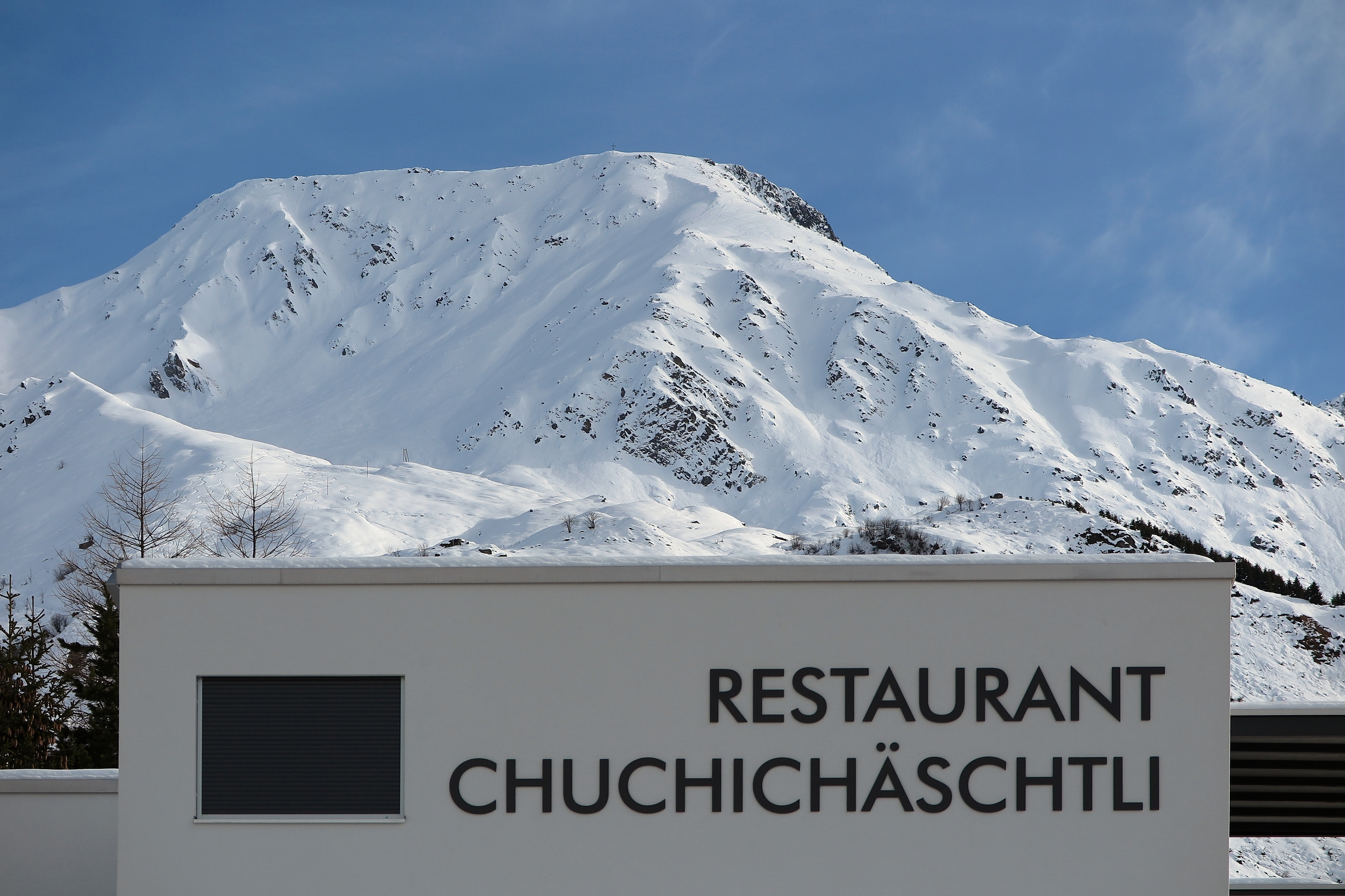
Swiss German restaurant sign in Andermatt: "Chuchichäschtli", in Standard German "Küchenkästlein"

Alemannic dialects are spoken in Switzerland (High Alemannic in the densely populated Swiss Plateau including Zürich and Bern, in the south also Highest Alemannic, and Low Alemannic in Basel), Baden-Württemberg (Swabian and Low Alemannic, in the southwest also High Alemannic), Bavarian Swabia (Swabian, in the southwesternmost part also Low Alemannic), Vorarlberg/Austria (Low, High, and Highest Alemannic), Alsace/France (Low Alemannic, in the southernmost part also High Alemannic), Liechtenstein (High and Highest Alemannic), and in the district of Reutte in Tyrol, Austria (Swabian). The Alemannic dialects are considered

- German in Baden-Württemberg and Bavarian Swabia, Germany
- Vorarlbergerisch in Vorarlberg, Austria (considered dialects of German)
- Swiss German in Switzerland and Liechtenstein
- Alsatian in Alsace, France

In Germany, the Alemannic dialects are often referred to as Swabian in Bavarian Swabia and in the historical region of Württemberg, and as Badian in the historical region of Baden.

The southernmost German-speaking municipality is in the Alemannic region: Zermatt in the Canton of Valais, Switzerland, as is the capital of Liechtenstein: Vaduz.

===== Austro-Bavarian =====
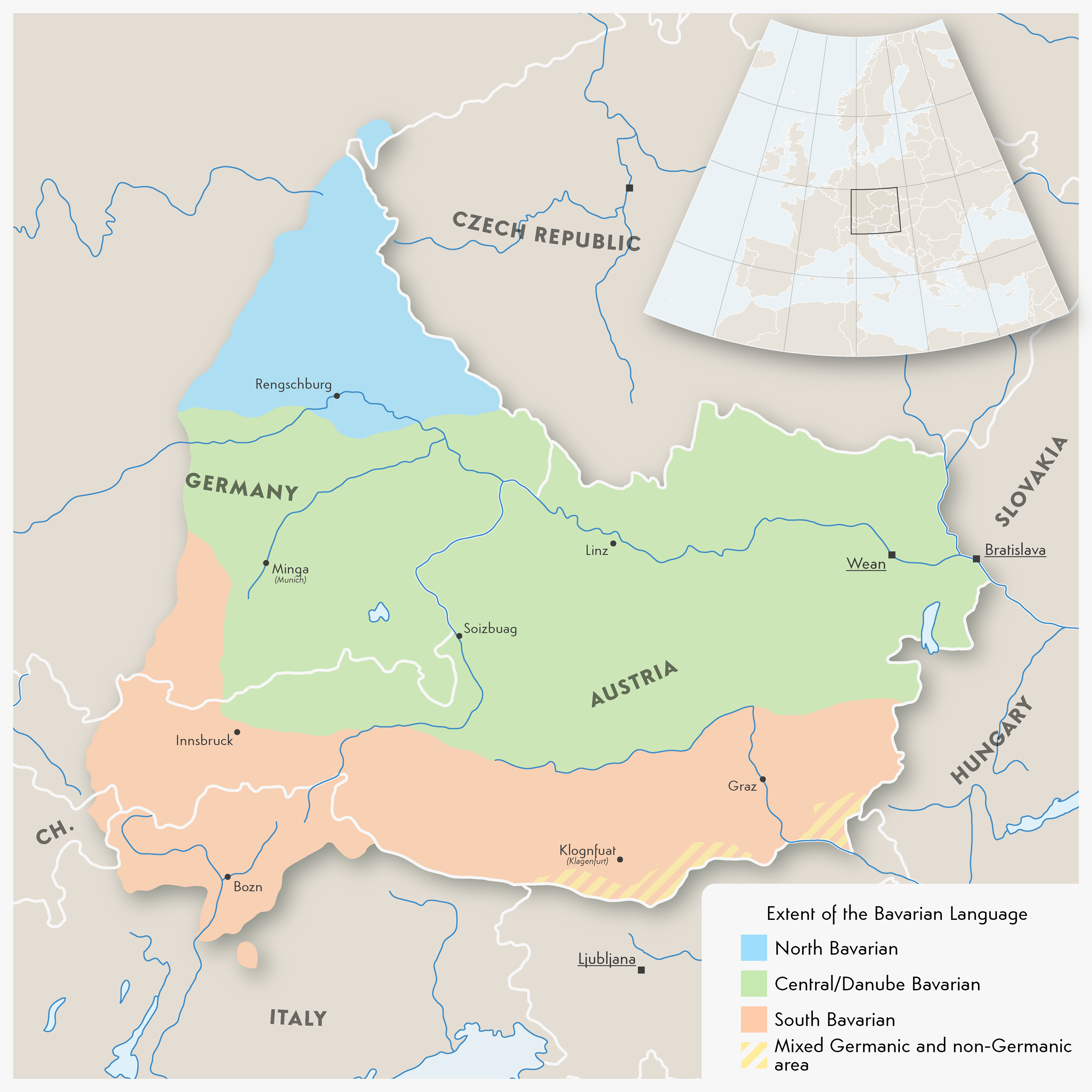
The Austro-Bavarian dialects

The Austro-Bavarian dialects are spoken in Austria (Vienna, Lower and Upper Austria, Styria, Carinthia, Salzburg, Burgenland, and in most parts of Tyrol), southern and eastern Bavaria (Upper and Lower Bavaria as well as Upper Palatinate), and South Tyrol. Austro-Bavarian is also spoken in southwesternmost Saxony: in the southernmost tip of Vogtland (in the Vogtland District around Adorf, Bad Brambach, Bad Elster and Markneukirchen), where it is referred to as Vogtländisch (Vogtlandian), just like the East Franconian variant that dominates in Vogtland. There is also one single Austro-Bavarian village in Switzerland: Samnaun in the Canton of the Grisons.

The northernmost Austro-Bavarian village is Breitenfeld (municipality of Markneukirchen, Saxony), the southernmost village is Salorno sulla Strada del Vino (German: Salurn an der Weinstraße), South Tyrol.

== Regiolects ==
- Berlinian, the High German regiolect or dialect of Berlin with Low German substrate
- Missingsch, a Low-German-coloured variety of High German.
- Ruhrdeutsch (Ruhr German), the High German regiolect of the Ruhr area.

== Phonology ==
Main Article: Standard German phonology

=== Consonants ===
The German language has around 22 to 26 consonants, including some rarer clusters such as pf.

		Labial	Alveolar	Post- alveolar	Palatal	Velar/ Uvular	Glottal
Nasal		m	n			ŋ	
Plosive	Fortis	p	t			k	(ʔ)
Plosive	Lenis	b	d			ɡ	
Affricate	Fortis	pf	ts	tʃ			
Affricate	Lenis			(dʒ)			
Fricative	Fortis	f	s	ʃ	ç	(x)	h
Fricative	Lenis	v	z	(ʒ)			
Approximant			l		j		
Rhotic			r				

=== Vowels ===
Monophthong phonemes of Standard German
	Front				Central		Back	
	Unrounded		Rounded		Central		Back	
	short	long	short	long	short	long	short	long
Close	ɪ	iː	ʏ	yː			ʊ	uː
Close-mid		eː		øː	(ə)			oː
Open-mid	ɛ	(ɛː)	œ		(ɐ)		ɔ	
Open					a	aː		

==== Phonemic diphthongs ====
Diphthongs of standard German, from Dudenredaktion, Kleiner & Knöbl (2015:35)

	Ending point	
	Front	Back
Near-close	(ʊɪ̯)	
Open-mid	ɔɪ̯	
Open	aɪ̯	aʊ̯

== Orthography ==
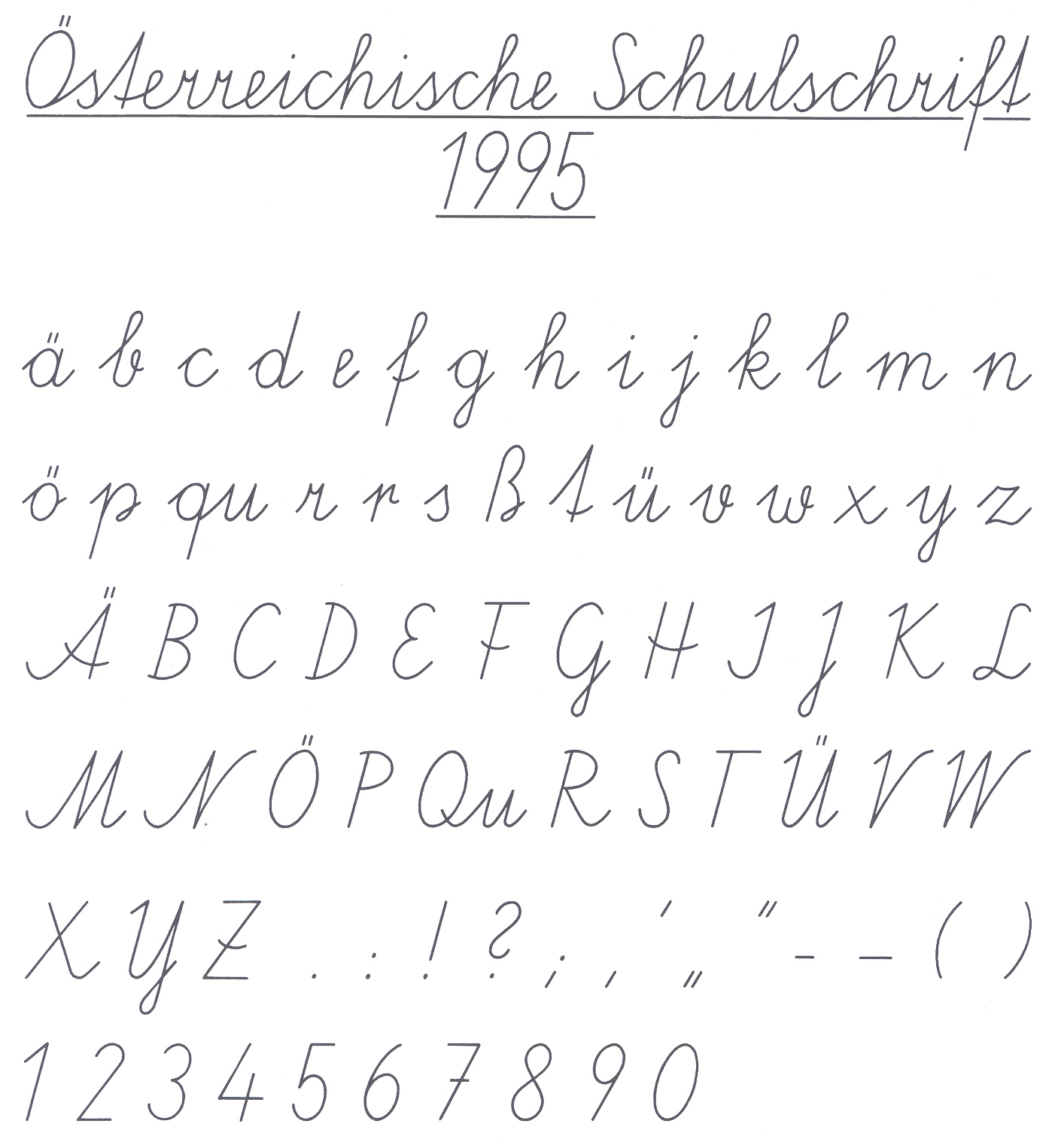
Austria's standardised cursive

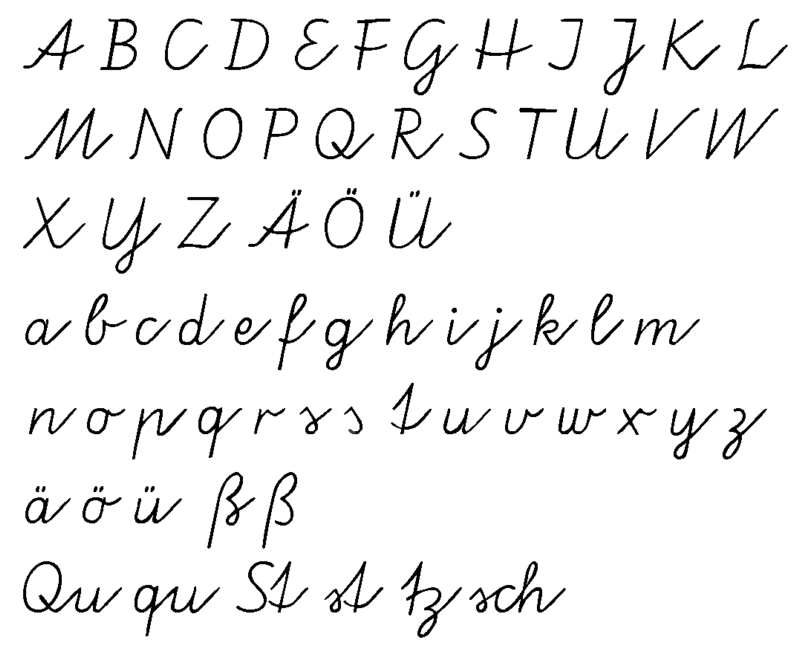
Germany's standardised cursive

Written texts in German are easily recognisable as such by distinguishing features such as umlauts and certain orthographical features, such as the capitalisation of all nouns, and the frequent occurrence of long compounds. Because legibility and convenience set certain boundaries, compounds consisting of more than three or four nouns are almost exclusively found in humorous contexts. (English also can string nouns together, though it usually separates the nouns with spaces: as, for example, "toilet bowl cleaner".)

In German orthography, nouns are capitalised, which makes it easier for readers to determine the function of a word within a sentence. This convention is almost unique to German today (shared perhaps only by the closely related Luxembourgish language and several insular dialects of the North Frisian language), but it was historically common in Northern Europe in the early modern era, including in languages such as Danish which abolished the capitalisation of nouns in 1948, and English for a while, into the 1700s.

=== Present ===
Before the German orthography reform of 1996, ß replaced ss after long vowels and diphthongs and before consonants, word-, or partial-word endings. In reformed spelling, ß replaces ss only after long vowels and diphthongs.

Since there is no traditional capital form of ß, it was replaced by SS (or SZ) when capitalisation was required. For example, Maßband (tape measure) became MASSBAND in capitals. An exception was the use of ß in legal documents and forms when capitalising names. To avoid confusion with similar names, lower case ß was sometimes maintained (thus "KREßLEIN" instead of "KRESSLEIN"). Capital ß (ẞ) was ultimately adopted into German orthography in 2017, ending a long orthographic debate (thus "KREẞLEIN and KRESSLEIN").

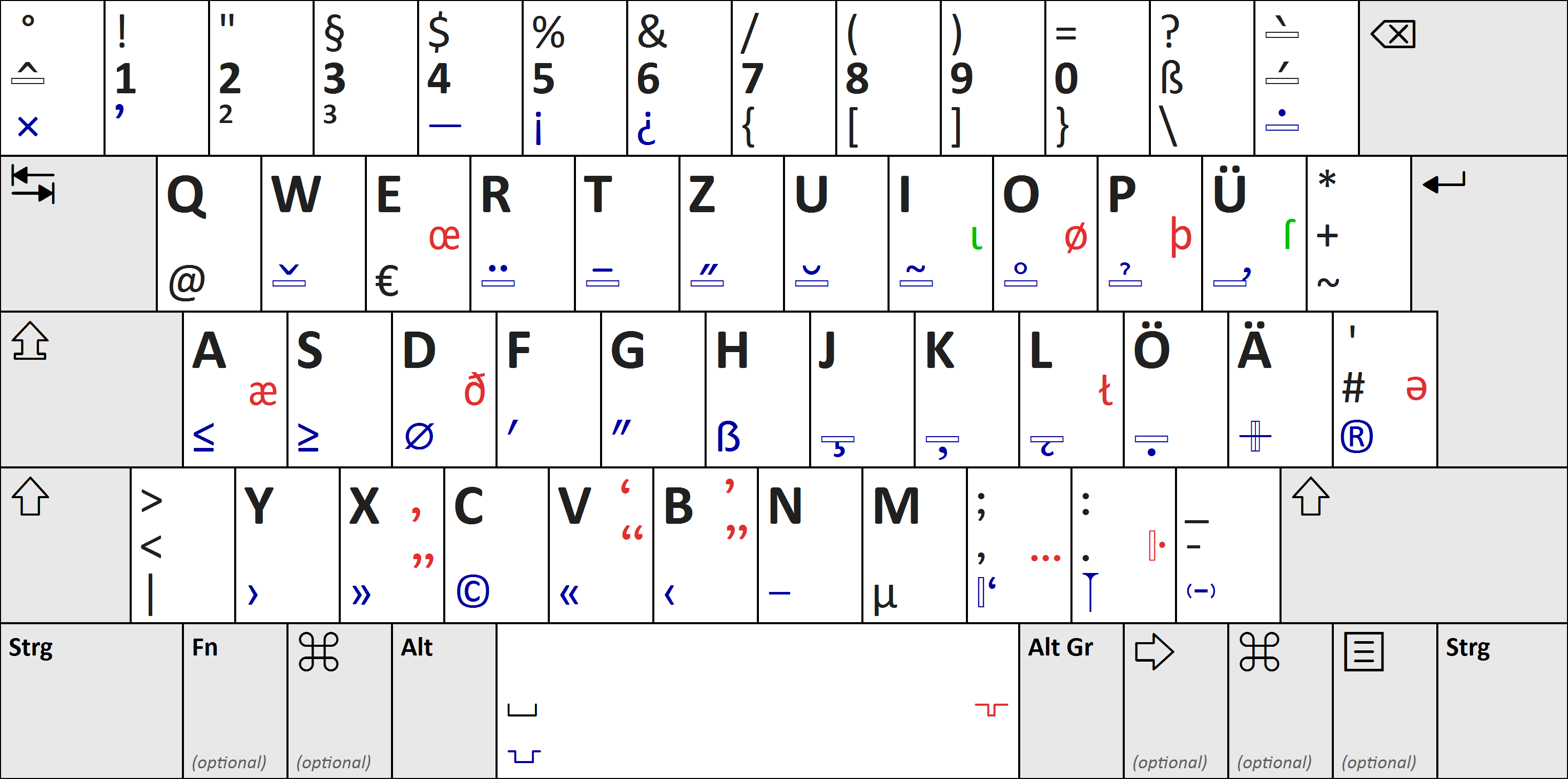
German computer keyboard layout

Umlaut vowels (ä, ö, ü) are commonly transcribed with ae, oe, and ue if the umlauts are not available on the keyboard or other medium used. In the same manner, ß can be transcribed as ss. Some operating systems use key sequences to extend the set of possible characters to include, amongst other things, umlauts; in Microsoft Windows this is done using Alt codes. German readers understand these transcriptions (although they appear unusual), but they are avoided if the regular umlauts are available, because they are a makeshift and not proper spelling. (In Westphalia and Schleswig-Holstein, city and family names exist where the extra e has a vowel lengthening effect, e.g., Raesfeld [ˈraːsfɛlt], Coesfeld [ˈkoːsfɛlt] and Itzehoe [ɪtsəˈhoː], but this use of the letter e after a/o/u does not occur in the present-day spelling of words other than proper nouns.)

German alphabet
(Listen to a German speaker recite the alphabet in German)

There is no general agreement on where letters with umlauts occur in the sorting sequence. Telephone directories treat them by replacing them with the base vowel followed by an e. Some dictionaries sort each umlauted vowel as a separate letter after the base vowel, but more commonly words with umlauts are ordered immediately after the same word without umlauts. As an example in a telephone book Ärzte occurs after Adressenverlage but before Anlagenbauer (because Ä is replaced by Ae). In a dictionary Ärzte comes after Arzt, but in some dictionaries Ärzte and all other words starting with Ä may occur after all words starting with A. In some older dictionaries or indexes, initial Sch and St are treated as separate letters and are listed as separate entries after S, but they are usually treated as S+C+H and S+T.

Written German also typically uses an alternative opening inverted comma (quotation mark) as in „Guten Morgen!“.

=== Past ===
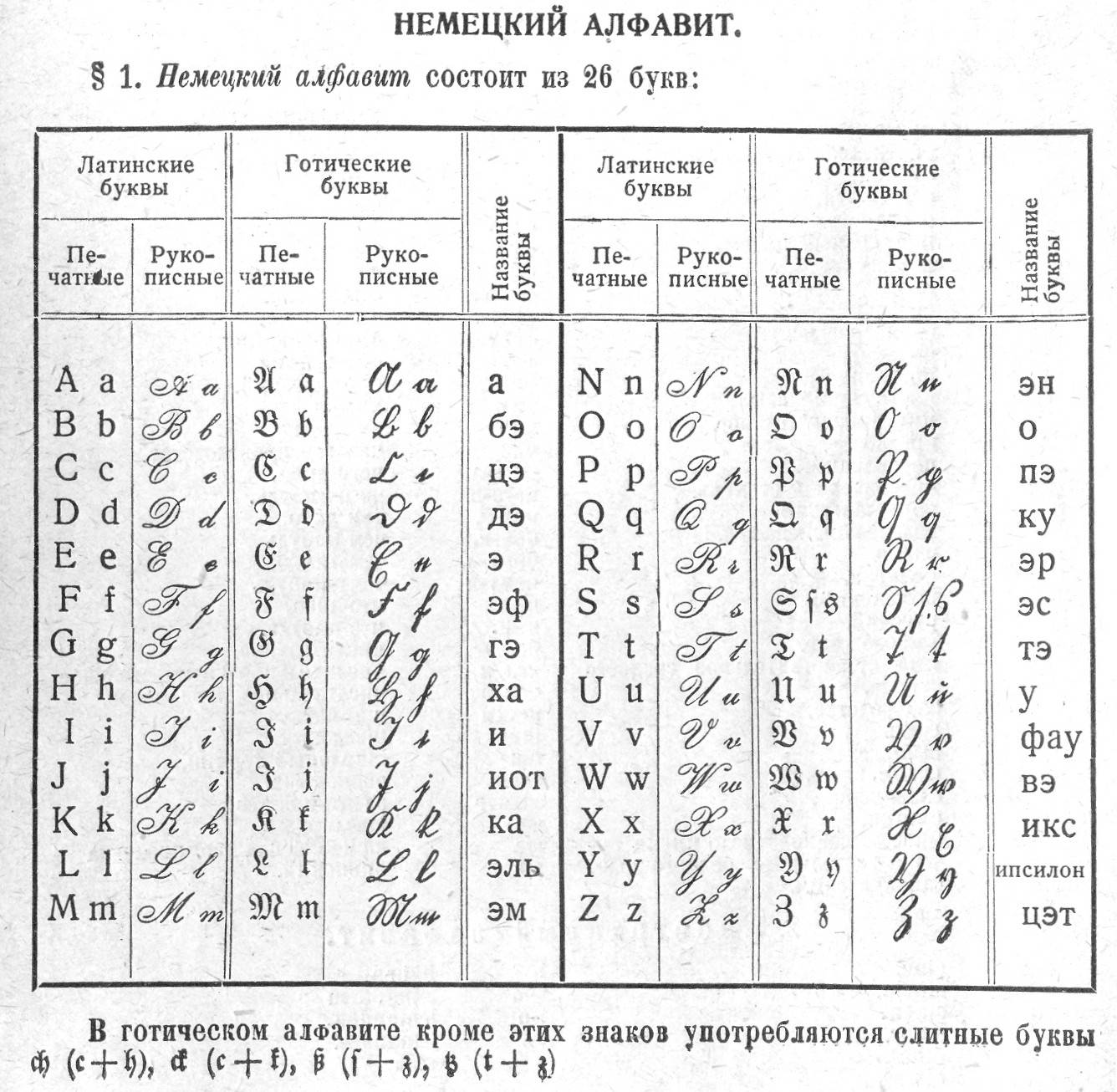
A Russian dictionary from 1931, showing the "German alphabet" – the 3rd and 4th columns of each half are Fraktur and Kurrent respectively, with the footnote explaining ligatures used in Fraktur

Until the early 20th century, German was printed in blackletter typefaces (in Fraktur, and in Schwabacher), and written in corresponding handwriting (for example Kurrent and Sütterlin). These variants of the Latin alphabet are very different from the serif or sans-serif Antiqua typefaces used today, and the handwritten forms in particular are difficult for the untrained to read. The printed forms, however, were claimed by some to be more readable when used for Germanic languages. The Nazis initially promoted Fraktur and Schwabacher because they were considered Aryan, but abolished them in 1941, claiming the letters were Jewish. It is also believed this script was banned, as the German government understood Fraktur would inhibit communication in the territories occupied during World War II.

The Fraktur script however remains present in everyday life in pub signs, beer brands and other forms of advertisement, where it is used to convey a certain rusticality and antiquity.

A proper use of the long s (langes s), ſ, is essential for writing German text in Fraktur typefaces. Many Antiqua typefaces also include the long s. A specific set of rules applies for the use of long s in German text, but nowadays it is rarely used in Antiqua typesetting. Any lower case "s" at the beginning of a syllable would be a long s, as opposed to a terminal s or short s (the more common variation of the letter s), which marks the end of a syllable; for example, in differentiating between the words Wachſtube (guard-house) and Wachstube (tube of polish/wax). One can easily decide which "s" to use by appropriate hyphenation, (Wach-ſtube vs. Wachs-tube). The long s only appears in lower case.

== Grammar ==
German is a fusional language with a moderate degree of inflection, with three grammatical genders; as such, there can be a large number of words derived from the same root.

=== Noun inflection ===
Declension of the Standard German definite article
Case	Masc.	Neu.	Fem.	Plural
Nominative	der	das	die	die
Accusative	den	das	die	die
Dative	dem	dem	der	den
Genitive	des	des	der	der

German nouns inflect by case, gender, and number:

- four cases: nominative, accusative, genitive, and dative.
- three genders: masculine, feminine, and neuter. For the majority of nouns (especially masculine and neuter ones), the gender is not predictable from the word's shape. Affixes sometimes reveal grammatical gender: for instance, nouns ending in -ung (-ing), -schaft (-ship), -keit or heit (-hood, -ness) are feminine, nouns ending in -chen or -lein (diminutive forms) are neuter and nouns ending in -ismus (-ism) are masculine. However, most words do not have strictly gendered affixes.
- two numbers: singular and plural.

This degree of inflection is considerably less than in Old High German and other old Indo-European languages such as Latin, Ancient Greek, and Sanskrit, and it is also somewhat less than, for instance, Old English, modern Icelandic, or Russian. The three genders have collapsed in the plural. With four cases and three genders plus plural, there are 16 permutations of case and gender/number of the article (not the nouns), but there are only six forms of the definite article, which together cover all 16 permutations. In nouns, inflection for case is required in the singular for strong masculine and neuter nouns only in the genitive and in the dative (only in fixed or archaic expressions), and even this is losing ground to substitutes in informal speech. Weak masculine nouns share a common case ending for genitive, dative, and accusative in the singular. Feminine nouns are not declined in the singular. The plural has an inflection for the dative. In total, seven inflectional endings (not counting plural markers) exist in German: -s, -es, -n, -ns, -en, -ens, -e.

=== Compounding ===
Like the other Germanic languages, German forms noun compounds in which the first noun modifies the category given by the second: Hundehütte ("dog hut"; specifically: "dog kennel"). Unlike English, whose newer compounds or combinations of longer nouns are often written "open" with separating spaces, German (like some other Germanic languages) nearly always uses the "closed" form without spaces, for example: Baumhaus ("tree house"). Like English, German allows arbitrarily long compounds in theory (see also English compounds). The longest German word verified to be actually in (albeit very limited) use is Rindfleischetikettierungsüberwachungsaufgabenübertragungsgesetz, which, literally translated, is "beef labelling supervision duties assignment law" [from Rind (cattle), Fleisch (meat), Etikettierung(s) (labelling), Überwachung(s) (supervision), Aufgaben (duties), Übertragung(s) (assignment), Gesetz (law)]. However, examples like this are perceived by native speakers as excessively bureaucratic, stylistically awkward, or even satirical. On the other hand, even this compound could be expanded by any native speaker.

=== Verb inflection ===
The inflection of standard German verbs includes:

- Two main conjugation classes: weak and strong (as in English). Additionally, there is a third class, known as mixed verbs, whose conjugation combines features of both the strong and weak patterns.
- Three persons: first, second and third.
- Two numbers: singular and plural.
- Three moods: indicative, imperative and subjunctive (in addition to infinitive).
- Two voices: active and passive. The passive voice uses auxiliary verbs and is divisible into static and dynamic. Static forms show a constant state and use the verb to be (sein). Dynamic forms show an action and use the verb to become (werden).
- Two tenses without auxiliary verbs (present and preterite) and four tenses constructed with auxiliary verbs (perfect, pluperfect, future and future perfect).
- The distinction between grammatical aspects is rendered by combined use of the subjunctive or preterite marking so the plain indicative voice uses neither of those two markers; the subjunctive by itself often conveys reported speech; subjunctive plus preterite marks the conditional state; and the preterite alone shows either plain indicative (in the past), or functions as a (literal) alternative for either reported speech or the conditional state of the verb, when necessary for clarity.
- The distinction between perfect and progressive aspect is and has, at every stage of development, been a productive category of the older language and in nearly all documented dialects, but strangely enough it is now rigorously excluded from written usage in its present normalised form.
- Disambiguation of completed vs. uncompleted forms is widely observed and regularly generated by common prefixes (blicken [to look], erblicken [to see – unrelated form: sehen]).

==== Verb prefixes ====
The meaning of basic verbs can be expanded and sometimes radically changed through the use of a number of prefixes. Some prefixes have a specific meaning; the prefix zer- refers to destruction, as in zerreißen (to tear apart), zerbrechen (to break apart), zerschneiden (to cut apart). Other prefixes have only the vaguest meaning in themselves; ver- is found in a number of verbs with a large variety of meanings, as in versuchen (to try) from suchen (to seek), vernehmen (to interrogate) from nehmen (to take), verteilen (to distribute) from teilen (to share), verstehen (to understand) from stehen (to stand).

Other examples include the following: haften (to stick), verhaften (to detain); kaufen (to buy), verkaufen (to sell); hören (to hear), aufhören (to cease); fahren (to drive), erfahren (to experience).

Many German verbs have a separable prefix, often with an adverbial function. In finite verb forms, it is split off and moved to the end of the clause and is hence considered by some to be a "resultative particle". For example, mitgehen, meaning "to go along", would be split, giving Gehen Sie mit? (Literal: "Go you with?"; Idiomatic: "Are you going along?").

Indeed, several parenthetical clauses may occur between the prefix of a finite verb and its complement (ankommen = to arrive, er kam an = he arrived, er ist angekommen = he has arrived):

Er kam am Freitagabend nach einem harten Arbeitstag und dem üblichen Ärger, der ihn schon seit Jahren immer wieder an seinem Arbeitsplatz plagt, mit fraglicher Freude auf ein Mahl, das seine Frau ihm, wie er hoffte, bereits aufgetischt hatte, endlich zu Hause an.

A selectively literal translation of this example to illustrate the point might look like this:

He "came" on Friday evening, after a hard day at work and the usual annoyances that had time and again been troubling him for years now at his workplace, with questionable joy, to a meal which, as he hoped, his wife had already put on the table, finally home "to".

=== Word order ===
German word order is generally with the V2 word order restriction and also with the SOV word order restriction for subordinate as well as for main clauses including an auxiliary verb. As to subordinate clauses, all verb forms occur at the very end. For yes–no questions, exclamations, and wishes, the finite verb usually has the first position.

German requires a verbal element (main verb, modal verb or auxiliary verb as finite verb) to appear second in the sentence. The verb is preceded by the topic of the sentence or an adverbial of flexible length. The element in focus appears at the end of the sentence. For a sentence without an auxiliary, these are several possibilities:

Der alte Mann gab mir gestern das Buch. (The old man gave me yesterday the book; normal subject-verb-object order)
Das Buch gab mir gestern der alte Mann. (The book gave [to] me yesterday the old man)
Das Buch gab der alte Mann mir gestern. (The book gave the old man [to] me yesterday)
Das Buch gab mir der alte Mann gestern. (The book gave [to] me the old man yesterday)
Gestern gab mir der alte Mann das Buch. (Yesterday gave [to] me the old man the book; normal order)
Gestern gab der alte Mann mir das Buch. (Yesterday gave the old man [to] me the book; verb-subject-object order)
Mir gab der alte Mann das Buch gestern. ([To] me gave the old man the book yesterday (entailing: as for someone else, it was another date))

While the subject typically precedes the object, the position of a noun in a German sentence has no bearing on its being a subject, an object or another argument. In a declarative sentence in English, if the subject does not occur before the predicate, the sentence could well be misunderstood.

However, German's flexible word order allows one to emphasise specific words:

Normal word order:

Der Direktor betrat gestern um 10 Uhr mit einem Schirm in der Hand sein Büro.
The manager entered yesterday at 10 o'clock with an umbrella in the hand his office.

Second variant in normal word order:

Der Direktor betrat sein Büro gestern um 10 Uhr mit einem Schirm in der Hand.
The manager entered his office yesterday at 10 o'clock with an umbrella in the hand.

This variant accentuates the time specification and that he carried an umbrella.

Object in front:

Sein Büro betrat der Direktor gestern um 10 Uhr mit einem Schirm in der Hand.
His office entered the manager yesterday at 10 o'clock with an umbrella in the hand.

The object Sein Büro (his office) is thus highlighted; it could be the topic of the next sentence.

Adverb of time in front:

Gestern betrat der Direktor um 10 Uhr mit einem Schirm in der Hand sein Büro. (aber heute ohne Schirm)
Yesterday entered the manager at 10 o'clock with an umbrella in the hand his office. (but today without umbrella)

Both time expressions in front:

Gestern um 10 Uhr betrat der Direktor mit einem Schirm in der Hand sein Büro.
Yesterday at 10 o'clock entered the manager with an umbrella in the hand his office.

The full-time specification Gestern um 10 Uhr is highlighted.

Another possibility:

Gestern um 10 Uhr betrat der Direktor sein Büro mit einem Schirm in der Hand.
Yesterday at 10 o'clock entered the manager his office with an umbrella in the hand.

Both the time specification and the fact he carried an umbrella are accentuated.

Swapped adverbs:

Der Direktor betrat mit einem Schirm in der Hand gestern um 10 Uhr sein Büro.
The manager entered with an umbrella in the hand yesterday at 10 o'clock his office.

The phrase mit einem Schirm in der Hand is highlighted.

Swapped object:

Der Direktor betrat gestern um 10 Uhr sein Büro mit einem Schirm in der Hand.
The manager entered yesterday at 10 o'clock his office with an umbrella in the hand.

The time specification and the object sein Büro (his office) are lightly accentuated.

The flexible word order also allows one to use language "tools" (such as poetic metre and figures of speech) more freely.

==== Auxiliary verbs ====
When an auxiliary verb is present in the main clause, it appears in second position, and the main verb appears at the end. This occurs notably in the creation of the perfect tense. Many word orders are still possible:

Der alte Mann hat mir heute das Buch gegeben. (The old man has [to] me today the book given.)
Das Buch hat der alte Mann mir heute gegeben. (The book has the old man [to] me today given.)
Heute hat der alte Mann mir das Buch gegeben. (Today has the old man [to] me the book given.)

The main verb may appear in first position to put stress on the action itself. The auxiliary verb is still in second position.

Gegeben hat mir der alte Mann das Buch heute. (Given has me the old man the book today.) The bare fact that the book has been given is emphasised, as well as 'today'.

==== Modal verbs ====
Sentences using modal verbs as finite verbs place the infinitive at the end. For example, the English sentence "Should he go home?" would be rearranged in German to say "Should he (to) home go?" (Soll er nach Hause gehen?). Thus, in sentences with several subordinate or relative clauses, the infinitives are clustered at the end. Compare the similar clustering of prepositions in the following (highly contrived) English sentence: "What did you bring that book that I do not like to be read to out of up for?"

==== Multiple infinitives ====
German subordinate clauses have all verbs clustered at the end, with the finite verb normally in the final position of the cluster. Given that auxiliaries encode future, passive, modality, and the perfect, very long chains of verbs at the end of the sentence can occur. In these constructions, the past particle formed with ge- is often replaced by the infinitive.

Man nimmt an, dass der Deserteur wohl erschossen_{V} worden_{psv} sein_{perf} soll_{mod}
One suspects that the deserter probably shot become be should.
("It is suspected that the deserter probably had been shot")
Er wusste nicht, dass der Agent einen Nachschlüssel hatte machen lassen
He knew not that the agent a picklock had make let
Er wusste nicht, dass der Agent einen Nachschlüssel machen lassen hatte
He knew not that the agent a picklock make let had
("He did not know that the agent had had a picklock made")

The order at the end of such strings is subject to variation, but the second one in the last example is unusual.

== Vocabulary ==
Most German vocabulary is derived from the Germanic branch of the Indo-European language family. However, there is a significant number of loanwords from other languages, in particular Latin, Greek, Italian, French, and most recently English. In the early 19th century, Joachim Heinrich Campe estimated that one fifth of the total German vocabulary was of French or Latin origin.

Latin words were already imported into the predecessor of the German language during the Roman Empire and underwent all the characteristic phonetic changes in German. Their origin is thus no longer recognisable for most speakers (e.g., Pforte, Tafel, Mauer, Käse, Köln from Latin porta, tabula, murus, caseus, Colonia). Borrowing from Latin continued after the fall of the Roman Empire during Christianisation, mediated by the church and monasteries. Another important influx of Latin words can be observed during Renaissance humanism. In a scholarly context, the borrowings from Latin have continued until today, in the last few decades often indirectly through borrowings from English. During the 15th to 17th centuries, the influence of Italian was great, leading to many Italian loanwords in the fields of architecture, finance and music. The influence of the French language in the 17th to 19th centuries resulted in an even greater import of French words. The English influence was already present in the 19th century, but it did not become dominant until the second half of the 20th century.

Thus, Notker Labeo translated the Aristotelian treatises into pure (Old High) German in the decades after the year 1000. The tradition of loan translation revitalised in the 17th and 18th century with poets like Philipp von Zesen or linguists like Joachim Heinrich Campe, who introduced close to 300 words, which are still used in modern German. Even today, there are movements that promote the substitution of foreign words that are deemed unnecessary with German alternatives.

As in other Germanic languages, there are many pairs of synonyms due to the enrichment of the Germanic vocabulary with loanwords from Latin and Latinised Greek. These words often have different connotations from their Germanic counterparts and are usually perceived as more scholarly.

- Historie, historisch – "history, historical", (Geschichte, geschichtlich)
- Humanität, human – "humaneness, humane", (Menschlichkeit, menschlich) (Note: menschlich, and occasionally human, may also mean "human, pertaining to humans", whereas Menschlichkeit and Humanität never mean "humanity, human race", which translates to Menschheit.)
- Millennium – "millennium", (Jahrtausend)
- Perzeption – "perception", (Wahrnehmung)
- Vokabular – "vocabulary", (Wortschatz)
- Diktionär – "dictionary, wordbook", (Wörterbuch) (Note: In modern German, Diktionär is mostly considered archaic.)
- probieren – "to try", (versuchen)
- proponieren – "to propose", (vorschlagen)

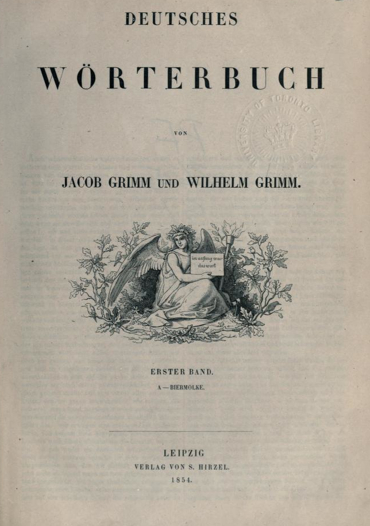
The Deutsches Wörterbuch (1st vol., 1854) by the Brothers Grimm

The size of the vocabulary of German is difficult to estimate. The Deutsches Wörterbuch (German Dictionary), initiated by the Brothers Grimm (Jacob and Wilhelm Grimm) and the most comprehensive guide to the vocabulary of the German language, already contained over 330,000 headwords in its first edition. The modern German scientific vocabulary is estimated at nine million words and word groups (based on the analysis of 35 million sentences of a corpus in Leipzig, which as of July 2003 included 500 million words in total).

== Literature ==
The German language is used in German literature and can be traced back to the Romans and Germania. German literature developed extensively during Middle Ages, with the most notable authors of the period being Walther von der Vogelweide and Wolfram von Eschenbach. The Nibelungenlied, whose author remains unknown, is also an important work of the epoch. The fairy tales collected and published by Jacob and Wilhelm Grimm in the 19th century became famous throughout the world.

Reformer and theologian Martin Luther, who translated the Bible into High German (a regional group of German varieties at southern and therefore higher regions), is widely credited for attributed to the basis for the modern Standard German language. Among the best-known poets and authors in German are Lessing, Goethe, Schiller, Kleist, Hoffmann, Brecht, Heine and Kafka. Fourteen German-speaking people have won the Nobel Prize in Literature: Theodor Mommsen, Rudolf Christoph Eucken, Paul von Heyse, Gerhart Hauptmann, Carl Spitteler, Thomas Mann, Nelly Sachs, Hermann Hesse, Heinrich Böll, Elias Canetti, Günter Grass, Elfriede Jelinek, Herta Müller and in 2019 Peter Handke, making it the second most awarded linguistic region (together with French) after English.

Johann Wolfgang von Goethe (1749–1832)	Friedrich Schiller (1759–1805)	Brothers Grimm (1785–1863)	Thomas Mann (1875–1955)	Hermann Hesse (1877–1962)

== See also ==
- Outline of German language
- Denglisch
- Deutsch (disambiguation)
- German family name etymology
- German toponymy
- Germanism (linguistics)
- German exonyms
- List of German expressions in English
- List of German words of French origin
- List of pseudo-German words in English
- List of terms used for Germans
- List of countries and territories where German is an official language
- Names of Germany
- DDR German

== Bibliography ==
- Ammon, Ulrich; Bickel, Hans; Ebner, Jakob; Gasser, Markus; Esterhammer, Ruth (2004). Variantenwörterbuch des Deutschen: Die Standardsprache in Österreich, der Schweiz und Deutschland sowie in Liechtenstein, Luxemburg, Ostbelgien und Südtirol [German variant dictionary: The standard language in Austria, Switzerland and Germany as well as in Liechtenstein, Luxembourg, East Belgium and South Tyrol] (in German). Berlin: W. de Gruyter. ISBN 978-3-11-016575-3. Archived from the original on 29 January 2024.
- Bach, Adolf (1965). Geschichte der deutschen Sprache. Heidelberg: Quelle & Meyer.
- Barbour, Stephen; Stevenson, Patrick (1990). Variation in German. Cambridge: Cambridge University Press. ISBN 978-0-521-35704-3.
- Cercignani, Fausto (1979). The Consonants of German: Synchrony and Diachrony. Milano: Cisalpino.
- Clyne, Michael (1995). The German Language in a Changing Europe. Cambridge University Press. ISBN 978-0-521-49970-5.
- Curme, George O. (1922) [1904]. A Grammar of the German Language.
- Deumert, Ama (2003). Markedness and salience in language contact and second-language acquisition: evidence from a non-canonical contact language. Language Sciences. Vol. 25. Elsevier Ltd. pp. 561–613. doi:10.1016/S0388-0001(03)00033-0.
- Dickens, A. G. (1974). The German Nation and Martin Luther. New York: Harper & Row.
- Dollinger, Stefan (2021). Österreichisches Deutsch oder Deutsch in Österreich? Identitäten im 21. Jahrhundert [Austrian German or German in Austria: Identities in the 21st Century] (3rd ed.). Vienna: New Academic Press. ISBN 978-3-99036-023-1. Archived from the original on 30 December 2023.
- Durrell, Martin (2006). "Germanic Languages". In Brown, Keith (ed.). Encyclopedia of Language & Linguistics. Elsevier. pp. 53–55. doi:10.1016/B0-08-044854-2/02189-1. ISBN 978-0-08-044299-0.
- Fox, Anthony (2005). The Structure of German. OUP Oxford. ISBN 978-0-19-927399-7.
- Giesbers, Charlotte (2008). Dialecten op de grens van twee talen : Een dialectologisch en sociolinguïstisch onderzoek in het Kleverlands dialectgebied [Dialects on the border of two languages: A dialectological and sociolinguistic investigation in the Kleverland dialect area]. Groesbeek: Reijngoudt-Giesbers. ISBN 978-90-813044-1-2. Archived from the original on 29 January 2024.
- Goossens, Jan (1977). Deutsche Dialektologie [German dialectology] (in German). Berlin: De Gruyter. ISBN 3-11-007203-3. Archived from the original on 29 January 2024.
- Goossens, Jan (1983). Niederdeutsch: Sprache und Literatur; Eine Einführung [Low German: language and literature; An introduction]. Vol. 1 (2., rev. and by a bibliogr. supplement expd. ed.). Neumünster: Karl Wachholtz. ISBN 3-529-04510-1.
- Harbert, Wayne (2006). The Germanic Languages. doi:10.1017/CBO9780511755071. ISBN 978-0-521-80825-5.
- Hattemer, Heinrich (1849). Denkmahle des Mittelalters: St. Gallen's altteutsche Sprachschætze [Monuments of the Middle Ages: St. Gallen's Old German vocabulary]. Vol. 3. Scheitlin und Zollikofer. Archived from the original on 29 January 2024.
- Heeringa, Wilbert Jan (2004). Measuring Dialect Pronunciation Differences using Levenshtein Distance (Thesis). Archived from the original on 29 January 2024.
- Holm, John A. (1989). "Kiautschou Pidgin German". Pidgins and Creoles: Volume 2, Reference Survey (1st ed.). Cambridge: Cambridge University Press. p. 616. ISBN 978-0-521-35940-5. Archived from the original on 21 June 2024.
- Kapr, Albert (1993). Fraktur: Form und Geschichte der gebrochenen Schriften (in German). Mainz: H. Schmidt. ISBN 978-3-87439-260-0.
- Keller, R. E. (1978). The German language. London: Faber. ISBN 978-0-571-11159-6.
- König, Ekkehard; Van der Auwera, Johan, eds. (1994). The Germanic Languages. Routledge Language Family Descriptions. Routledge. ISBN 978-0-415-28079-2. Archived from the original on 2 April 2015.
- König, Werner; Paul, Hans-Joachim (2019) [1978]. Dtv-Atlas. Deutsche Sprache (in German). Vol. 1 (19th revised ed.). Munich: Deutscher Taschenbuch Verlag. ISBN 978-3-423-03025-0. Archived from the original on 29 January 2024.
- Leao, Pedro Macedo (2011). Germany : Keys to understanding German Business Culture (1st ed.). US: Lulupress. ISBN 9781447862956.
- Lewis, M. Paul; Simons, Gary F.; Fennig, Charles D. (2015). Ethnologue: Languages of Africa and Europe, Eighteenth Edition (18th ed.). Dallas: SIL International. ISBN 978-1-55671-391-0. Archived from the original on 29 January 2024. "Sum of Standard German, Swiss German, and all German dialects not listed under "Standard German"."
- Lockwood, W. B. (1987). German Today: The Advanced Learner's Guide. Clarendon Press. ISBN 978-0-19-815850-9.
- Marten, Thomas; Sauer, Fritz Joachim, eds. (2005). Länderkunde – Deutschland, Österreich, Schweiz und Liechtenstein im Querschnitt [Regional Geography – An Overview of Germany, Austria, Switzerland and Liechtenstein] (in German). Berlin: Inform-Verlag. ISBN 978-3-9805843-1-9.
- Nerius, Dieter (January 2000). "Die Rolle der II. Orthographischen Konferenz (1901) in der Geschichte der Deutschen Rechtschreibung". Zeitschrift für deutsche Philologie (1) 3. doi:10.37307/j.1868-7806.2000.01.03. ISSN 0044-2496.
- Reinecke, Adolf (1910). Die deutsche Buchstabenschrift: Ihre Entstehung und Entwicklung, ihre Zweckmäßigkeit und völkische Bedeutung [The German letter font: Its origin and development, its advisability and folkish meaning] (in German). A. Hasert und C. Archived from the original on 29 January 2024.
- Robinson, Orrin W. (1992). Old English and its closest relatives : a survey of the earliest Germanic languages. Stanford, Calif.: Stanford University Press. ISBN 978-0-8047-2221-6.
- Rothaug, Rudolf (1910). Geographischer Atlas zur Vaterlandskunde an den österreichischen Mittelschulen [Geographical atlas on the homeland lore at the Austrian secondary schools] (in German). Vienna: G. Freytag & Berndt.
- Salmons, Joe (2012). A history of German : what the past reveals about today's language (1st ed.). Oxford: Oxford University Press. ISBN 978-0-19-969793-9.
- Sanders, Ruth H. (2010). German: Biography of a Language. Oxford University Press.
- Sanders, Willy (1982). Sachsensprache, Hansesprache, Plattdeutsch: Sprachgeschichtliche Grundzüge des Niederdeutschen [Saxon language, Hanseatic language, Low German: Linguistic-historical basics of Low German] (in German). Göttingen: Vandenhoeck & Ruprecht. ISBN 3-525-01213-6.
- Scherer, Wilhelm (1868). Zur Geschichte der deutschen Sprache [On the history of the German language] (in German). Berlin: Franz Duncker. Archived from the original on 29 January 2024.
- Scherer, Wilhelm; Jankowsky, Kurt R. (1995). Zur Geschichte der Deutschen Sprache [On the history of the German language]. Oxford University. Amsterdam; Philadelphia: J. Benjamins.
- Skottsberg, Carl (1911). The Wilds of Patagonia: A Narrative of the Swedish Expedition to Patagonia Tierra del Fuego and the Falkland Island in 1907– 1909. London, England: Edward Arnold.
- Siebs, Theodor (2000). Deutsche Aussprache. Hochsprache Bühnensprache – Alltagssprache [German pronunciation: Pure and moderate high accent with pronunciation dictionary] (in German) (19., umgearbeitete Auflage ed.). Wiesbaden. ISBN 3-928127-66-7.
- Steinicke, Ernst; Walder, Judith; Löffler, Roland; Beismann, Michael (20 December 1999). "Autochthonous Linguistic Minorities in the Italian Alps". Revue de Géographie Alpine. 99–2 (99–2). doi:10.4000/rga.1454. S2CID 85526804.
- Stellmacher, Dieter (2000). Niederdeutsche Sprache [Low German language] (in German) (2nd ed.). Berlin: Weidler. ISBN 978-3-89693-326-3.
- Super, Charles W. (1893). A history of the German language. University of California Libraries. Columbus, Ohio: Hann & Adair.
- Thomas, Calvin (1992). An Anthology of German Literature. D. C. Heath and Company. ASIN 1010180266.
- Swadesh, Morris (1971). The Origin and Diversification of Language. Transaction Publishers. ISBN 978-0-20-236982-2. Archived from the original on 29 January 2024.
- Upward, Chris (1997). "Spelling Reform in German". Journal of the Simplified Spelling Society. J21. Archived from the original on 23 September 2014.
- Von Polenz, Peter (1999). "6.5. Inter- und übernationale Beziehungen". Deutsche Sprachgeschichte vom Spätmittelalter bis zur Gegenwart [German language history from the late Middle Ages to the present]. de Gruyter Studienbuch (in German). Vol. Band III: 19. und 20. Jahrhundert. Berlin; New York: de Gruyter. ISBN 978-3-11-016426-8.
- Wagner, Claudio (2000). "Las áreas de "bocha", "polca" y "murra". Contacto de lenguas en el sur de Chile" [The "bocha", "polka" and "murra" areas. Language contact in southern Chile]. Revista de Dialectología y Tradiciones Populares (in Spanish). 55 (1): 185–196. doi:10.3989/rdtp.2000.v55.i1.432. S2CID 145209650.
- Waterman, John (1976). A history of the German language: with special reference to the cultural and social forces that shaped the standard literary language (Rev. ed.). Seattle: University of Washington Press. ISBN 978-0-295-73807-9.
- Weiss, Gerhard (1995). "Up-to-Date and with a Past: The "Duden" and its History". Die Unterrichtspraxis / Teaching German. 28 (1): 7–12. doi:10.2307/3531328. JSTOR 3531328.
- Wiesinger, Peter (1982). "Die Einteilung der deutschen Dialekte" [The classification of the German dialects]. In Besch, Werner; Wiegand, Herbert Ernst (eds.). Dialektologie. Ein Handbuch zur deutschen und allgemeinen Dialektforschung (in German) (1 ed.). Berlin, New York: Walter de Gruyter. ISBN 978-3-11-005977-9. Archived from the original on 29 January 2024.
