= Orrin W. Robinson =

Orrin W. Robinson may refer to:

- Orrin W. Robinson (politician) (1834-1907), American politician
- Orrin W. Robinson (philologist), American philologist
