= German Standard German =

Variety of Standard German in Germany

- Bundesdeutsches Hochdeutsch
- Pronunciation: [ˈbʊndəsdɔʏtʃəs ˈhoːxdɔʏtʃ]
- Region: Germany, Belgium, Luxembourg
- Language family: Indo-European: Germanic; West Germanic; High German; Standard German; German Standard German

Language codes
- ISO 639-3: –
- Glottolog: None
- IETF: de-DE

A German Standard German speaker, recorded in South Africa

German Standard German, Standard German of Germany, or High German of Germany, is the variety of Standard German that is written and spoken in Germany. It is the variety of German most commonly taught to foreigners. It is not uniform, which means it encompasses considerable regional variations. Linguist Anthony Fox writes that British English is more standardized than German Standard German.

== Bibliography ==
- Dürscheid, Christa; Giger, Nadio (2010), "Variation in the case system of German – linguistic analysis and optimality theory" (PDF), in Lenz, Alexandra N.; Plewnia, Albrecht (eds.), Grammar between Norm and Variation, Frankfurt am Main: Peter Lang, ISBN 978-3-631-61004-6
- Fox, Anthony (1990), The Structure of German, New York: Oxford University Press, Inc., ISBN 978-0-19-815821-9
- Horvath, Barbara M.; Vaughan, Paul (1991), Community languages: a handbook, Multilingual Matters, Multilingual Matters, ISBN 978-1853590917
- Russ, Charles (1994), The German Language Today: A Linguistic Introduction, London: Routledge, ISBN 978-0-203-42577-0
- Sanders, Ruth H. (2010), German: Biography of a Language: Biography of a Language, New York: Oxford University Press, Inc., ISBN 978-0-19-538845-9
