= Orrin W. Robinson (philologist) =

American philologist (born 1947)

- Born: June 1, 1947 (age 79)

Academic background
- Education: Cornell University

Academic work
- Discipline: Germanic linguistics
- Institutions: Stanford University

Orrin W. Robinson (born 1 June 1947) is an American philologist who is Professor Emeritus of German at Stanford University. He specializes in Germanic studies.

== Biography ==
Orrin W. Robinson gained his B.A. from Stanford University in 1968, and his Ph.D. in linguistics from Cornell University in 1972. He subsequently became Professor of German at Stanford University and chaired the department in the 1980s. Robinson has since retired from Stanford as Professor Emeritus of German.

Robinson's research centers on English, German and Germanic linguistics. He is the author of numerous works on these subjects.

== Selected works ==
- Old English and its closest relatives: a survey of the earliest Germanic languages, Stanford Univ. Pr., 1992. ISBN: 978-0-8047-2221-6
- Clause subordination and verb placement in the Old High German Isidor translation, Heidelberg: Universitätsverlag Heidelberg - Germanische Bibliothek series (Neue Folge, 3. Reihe: Untersuchungen, Bd. 26), 1997. ISBN 978-3-8253-0491-1
- Whose German?: the ach ich alternation and related phenomena in standard and colloquial., Amsterdam: John Benjamins (Current Issues in Linguistic Theory, Vol. 208), 2001. ISBN 978-1-5881-1007-7
- Grimm language: grammar, gender and genuineness in the fairy tales., Amsterdam: John Benjamins, 2010. ISBN: 978-9-0272-8822-6
