= Duchy of Carniola =

Duchy in Central Europe (1364–1918)

Duchy of Carniola Vojvodina Kranjska (Slovene) Herzogtum Krain (German) Ducatus Carnioliae (Latin)
- 1364–1918
- Flag Coat of arms

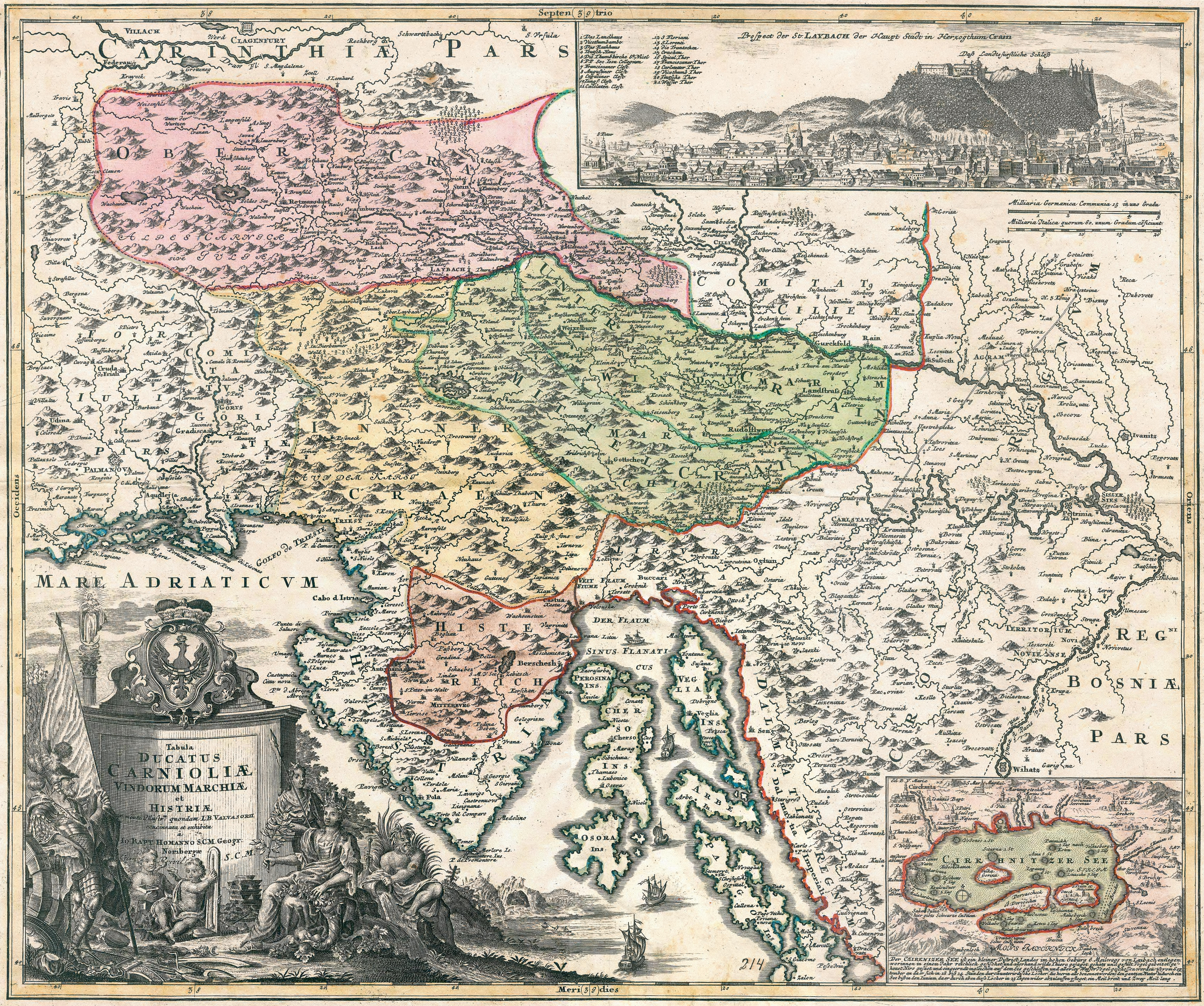
- The Duchy of Carniola in 1714

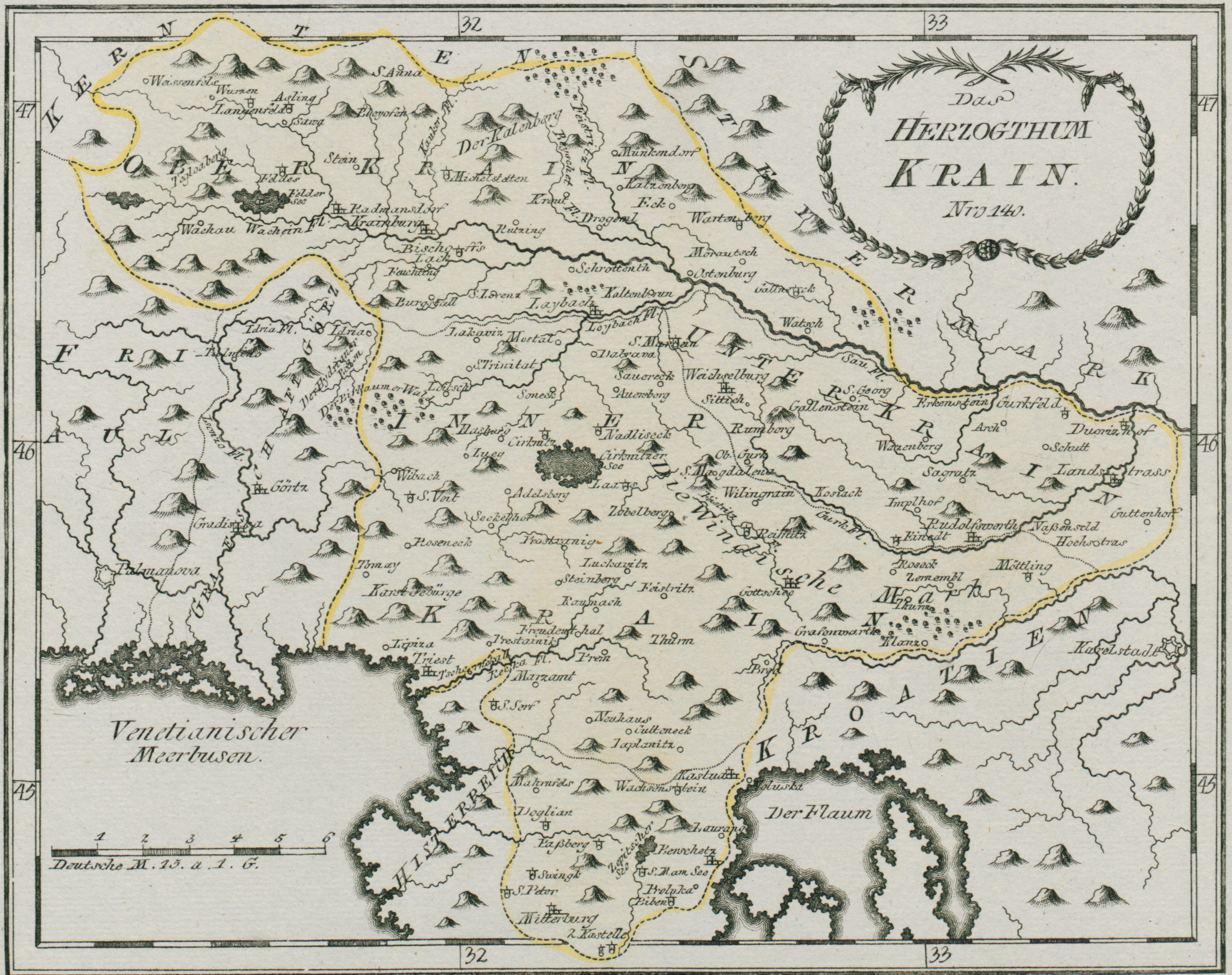
- The Duchy of Carniola in 1791
- Capital: Laibach (Ljubljana)
- Common languages: Slovene
- Religion: Roman Catholic
- Government: Principality
- Historical era: Middle Ages
  - March of Carniola bequeathed to House of Habsburg: 1335
  - Raised to Duchy: 1364
  - Part of Inner Austria: 1379
  - Joined Austrian Circle: 1512
  - Ceded to Illyrian Provinces: 1809
  - Restored to Austria: 1815
  - Part of the State of Slovenes, Croats and Serbs: 29 October 1918
- Currency: Florin
Preceded by	Succeeded by
March of Carniola	State of Slovenes, Croats and Serbs; Kingdom of Italy
- Today part of: Slovenia, Italy

Historical map of Inner Carniola, end of the 18th century

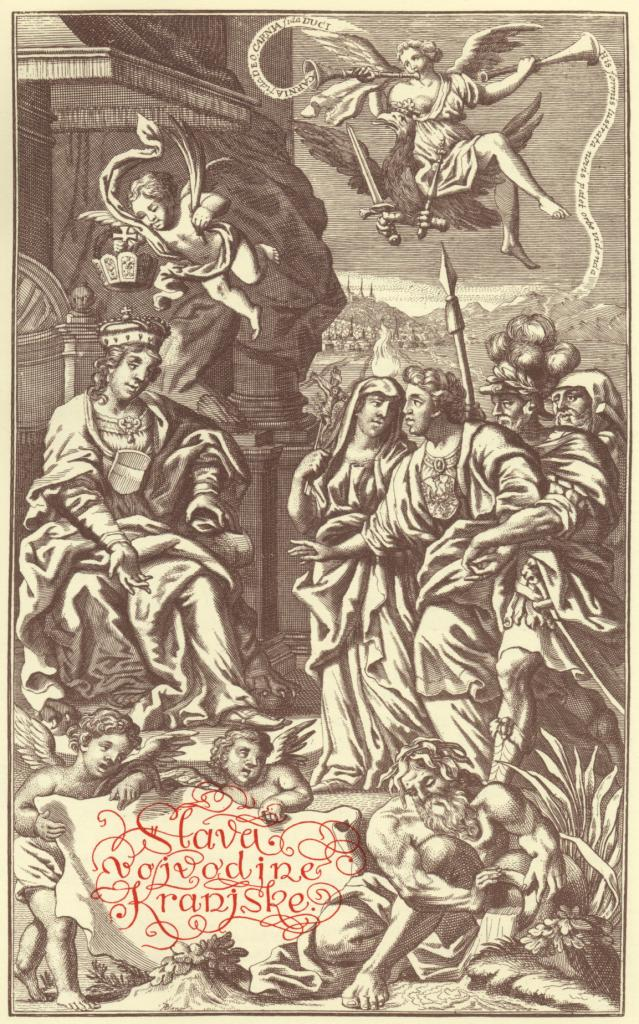
Allegory of Carniola (right), from the work The Glory of the Duchy of Carniola

The Duchy of Carniola (Slovene: Vojvodina Kranjska, German: Herzogtum Krain, Latin: Ducatus Carnioliae) was an imperial estate of the Holy Roman Empire, established under Habsburg rule on the territory of the former East Frankish March of Carniola in 1364. A hereditary land of the Habsburg monarchy, it became a constituent land of the Austrian Empire in 1804 and part of the Kingdom of Illyria until 1849. A separate crown land from 1849, it was incorporated into the Cisleithanian territories of Austria-Hungary from 1867 until the state's dissolution in 1918. Its capital was Laibach, today Ljubljana.

== Geography ==
The borders of the historic Carniola region had varied over the centuries. From the time of the duchy's establishment, it was located in the southeastern periphery of the Holy Roman Empire, where the Gorjanci Mountains and the Kolpa River formed the border with the Kingdom of Croatia.

In the north, it bordered the Imperial Duchy of Carinthia, from the Predil Pass and Fusine (Fužine) along the main ridge of the Karawanks range up to Jezersko. In the northeast and east, it bordered on the Duchy of Styria, i.e., the present-day Štajerska or Lower Styrian lands beyond the Sava River, which until 1456 were held by the Counts of Celje. In the west, the peaks of the Julian Alps high above Lake Bohinj marked the border with the historic Friulian region, initially held by the Patriarchs of Aquileia, but gradually conquered by the Republic of Venice and incorporated into the Domini di Terraferma by 1433. In the southwest, beyond the Dinaric Alps, the Counts of Görz held the remaining Friulian territory, which in 1754 became the Austrian crown land of Gorizia and Gradisca (part of the present-day Slovenian Littoral). The remains of the Margraviate of Istria south of the Karst Plateau and the Brkini Hills were also administered from Carniola.

In its final extent, re-established in 1815, the duchy had an area of 9,904 square kilometres (3,824 sq mi). In 1914, before the beginning of World War I, it had a population of a little under 530,000 inhabitants.

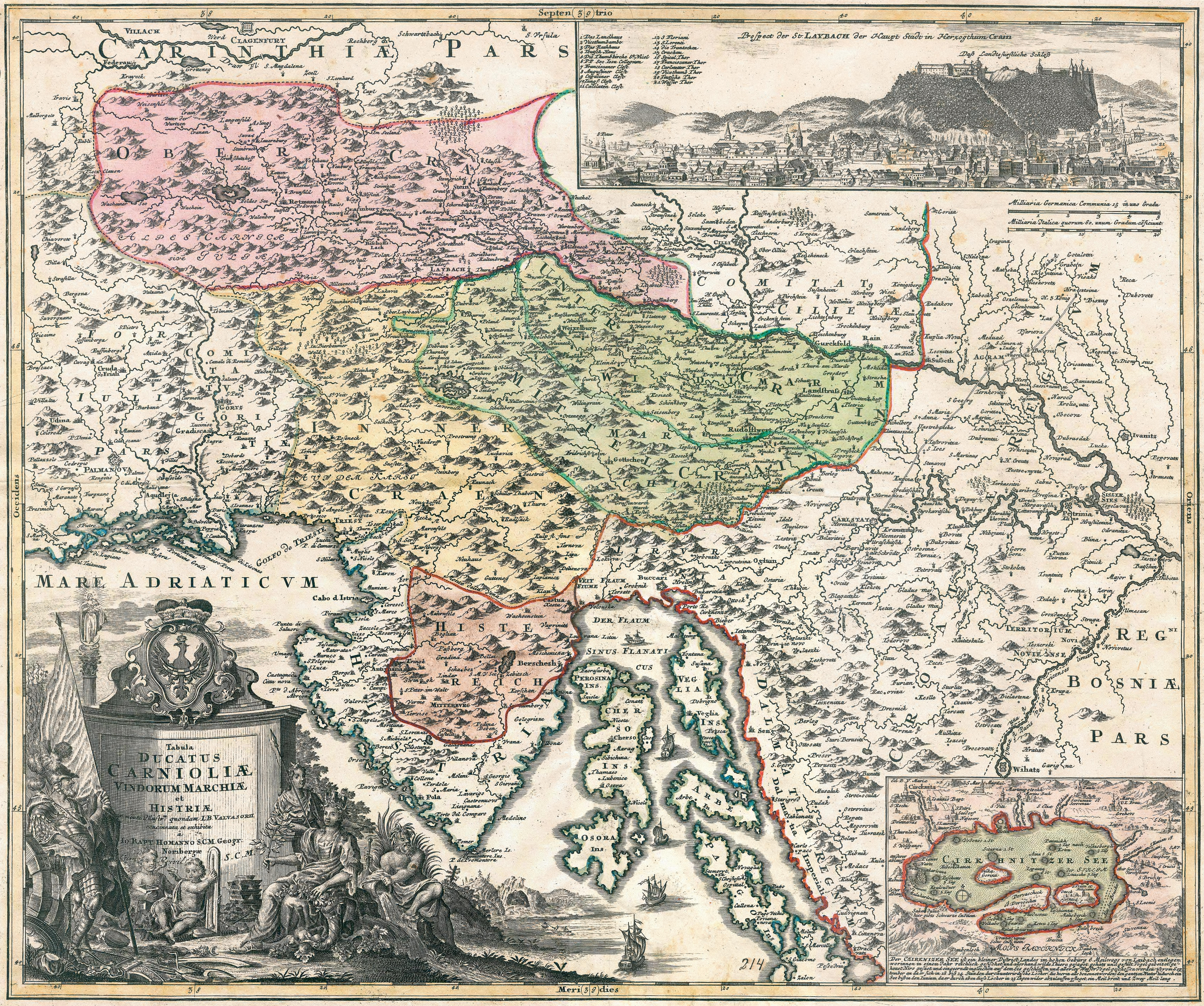
Historical map of the Carniolan duchy: Upper (pink), Lower (green) and Inner Carniola (yellow) with adjacent Istrian March (orange), Johann Homann, 1714

=== Administrative divisions ===
According to the topography The Glory of the Duchy of Carniola written by the scholar Johann Weikhard von Valvasor (1641–1693), the territory was traditionally divided into three sub-regions:

- Upper Carniola (Gorenjska), the mountainous part in the north, with the towns of Kranj and Kamnik
- Lower Carniola (Dolenjska), in the southeast, with Novo Mesto, Kočevje (Gottschee) and Krško, including White Carniola and the former Windic March
- Inner Carniola (Notranjska), in the southwest, around the towns of Idrija and Postojna.

Until 1860, these sub-regions coincided with the districts (Kreise) of Ljubljana, Novo Mesto and Postojna. They were later divided into smaller units, called political (or administrative) districts (German: Bezirkshauptmannshaft, Slovene: okrajno glavarstvo). Between 1861 and 1918, Carniola was divided into eleven districts consisting of 359 municipalities (German: Ortsgemeinde, Slovene: občina), with the provincial capital serving as the residence of the imperial governor (German: Landeshauptmann). The districts were: Kamnik, Kranj, Radovljica, the neighbourhood of Ljubljana, Logatec, Postojna, Litija, Krško, Novo Mesto, Črnomelj, and Kočevje. The political districts were in turn divided into 31 judicial circuits (German: Gerichtsbezirk, Slovene: sodnijski okraj).

== History and administration ==
The former March of Carniola, i.e., Upper Carniola and the Windic March, had been separated from the Duchy of Carinthia in 1040 by King Henry III of Germany. It was nevertheless temporarily still held by the Carinthian rulers in personal union, like the Meinhardiner Duke Henry VI, who died in 1335 without a male heir. His daughter Margaret was able to keep the County of Tyrol, while the Wittelsbach Emperor Louis IV passed Carinthia and Carniolan march to the Habsburg Duke Albert II of Austria, whose mother, Elisabeth of Carinthia is a sister of the late Duke Henry of Gorizia.

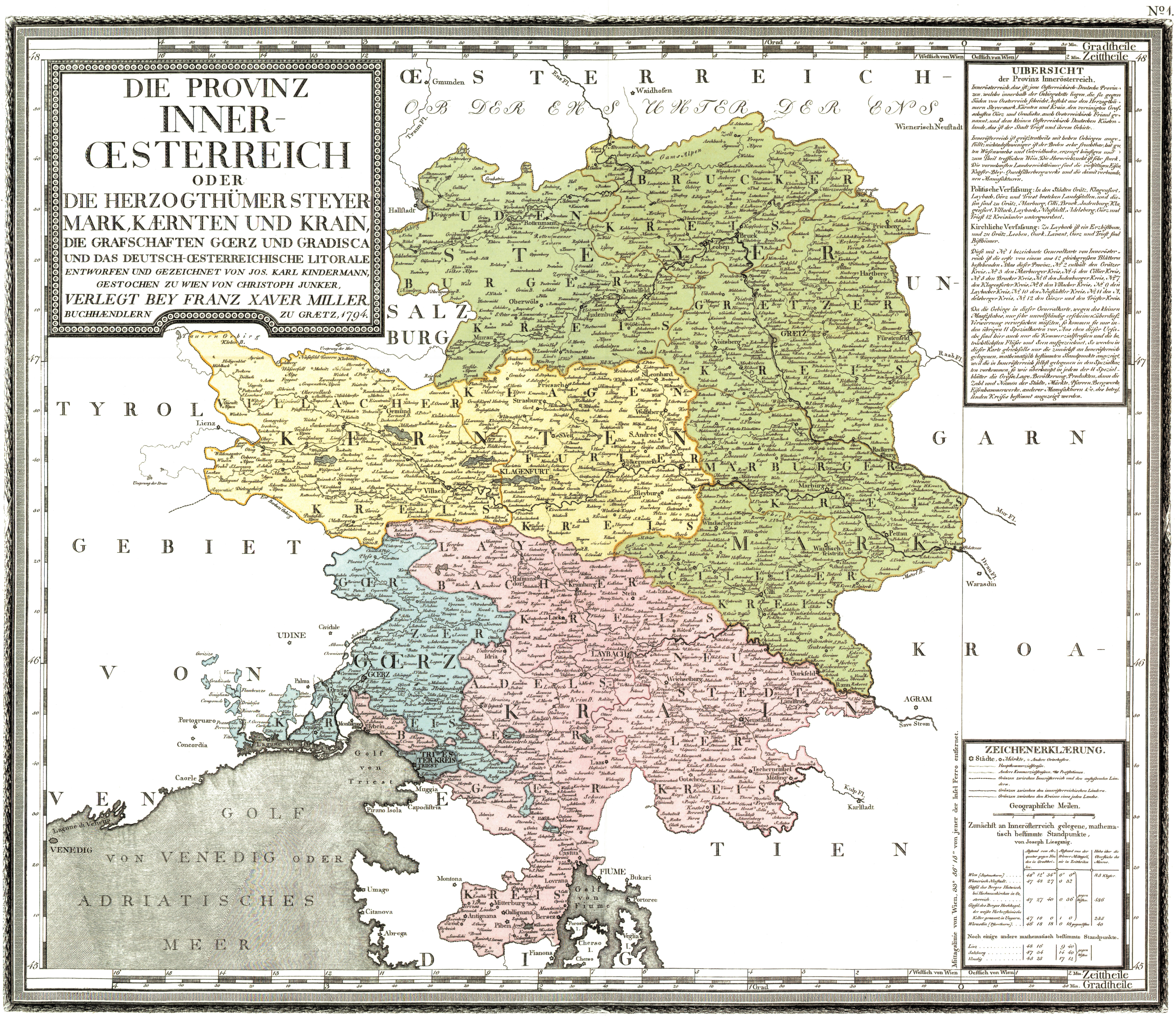
Carniola and Istria (pink) as part of Inner Austria, 1379–1457 and 1564–1619

Albert's son Rudolf IV of Austria, "the Founder", in the course of his Privilegium Maius, awarded himself the title of a "Duke of Carniola" in 1364—though without consent by the Holy Roman Emperor. Rudolph also founded the town of Novo Mesto in Lower Carniola, then named Rudolphswerth. After his death, as a result of the quarrels between his younger brothers Albert III and Leopold, Carniola by the 1379 Treaty of Neuberg became part of Inner Austria ruled from Graz by Leopold, ancestor of the Habsburg Leopoldian line. In 1457, the Inner Austrian territories were re-united with the Archduchy of Austria under the rule of the Habsburg Emperor Frederick III. When Frederick's descendant, Emperor Ferdinand I, died in 1564, Carniola was separated again as part of Inner Austria under the rule of Ferdinand's son Archduke Charles II. Charles' son, Emperor Ferdinand II, inherited all the dynasty's lands in 1619 and the duchy formed a constituent part of the Habsburg monarchy ever since.

In the late 15th century, as part of the Habsburg westward expansion, the Duchy of Carniola acquired many new territories: Idrija (previously part of Friuli), Duino and the surrounding parts of the Karst Plateau, Kastav, Opatija, and the interior areas of Istria, centered around Pazin. It also had nominal control over the port of Rijeka, which however de facto remained an autonomous city; in 1717 it was officially placed under direct imperial rule and in 1776 it was transferred to Hungary. In the 19th century, these areas (with the exception of Idrija) were incorporated in the Austrian Littoral, and Carniola thus became a landlocked region once again.

With the Treaty of Schönbrunn in 1809, Napoleon formed the short-lived Illyrian Provinces from the annexed territories in Carniola, Carinthia, Croatia, Gorizia and Gradisca, and Trieste. The Final Act of the 1815 Congress of Vienna restored the Illyrian Provinces to the Austrian Empire. Carniola then formed the central part of the territory of the Austrian Kingdom of Illyria, whose capital was also Ljubljana, including the Carniolan and Carinthian duchies as well as the Austrian Littoral with Gorizia and Gradisca, the Margraviate of Istria and the Imperial Free City of Trieste.

After the disestablishment of the Illyrian Kingdom in 1849, the Duchy of Carniola was constituted by rescript of 20 December 1860, and by imperial patent of 26 February 1861 (February Patent), modified by legislation of 21 December 1867, granting power to the Carniolan Landtag (or Carniolan Diet - estates' assembly) to enact all laws not reserved to the Imperial Council in Vienna, at which it was represented by eleven delegates, of whom two elected by the landowners, three by the cities, towns, commercial and industrial boards, five by the village communes, and one by a fifth curia by secret ballot, every duly registered male twenty-four years of age had the right to vote. The home legislature consisted of a single chamber of thirty-seven members, among whom the prince-bishop sat ex-officio. The emperor convened the legislature, and it was presided over by the k. k. Landeshauptmann (president of the Carniolan Diet – Landtag and its executive board – Landesausschuss). The landed interests elected ten members, the cities and towns eight, the commercial and industrial boards two, the village communes sixteen. The business of the chamber was restricted to legislating on agriculture, public and charitable institutions, administration of communes, church and school affairs, the transportation and housing of soldiers in war and during manoeuvres, and other local matters. The land budget of 1901 amounted to 3,573,280 crowns ($714,656).

The Austrian Imperial-Royal government was represented by the Imperial-Royal president (k. k. Landespräsident or governor), appointed by the emperor, and the Imperial-Royal Government (k. k. Landesregierung) in Ljubljana. In the majority of other Austrian crown lands these were known as Imperial-Royal Lieutenant (k. k. Statthalter) and Imperial-Royal Lieutenancy (k. k. Statthalterei).

In 1918, the duchy ceased to exist and its territory became part of the newly formed State of Slovenes, Croats and Serbs and subsequently part of the Kingdom of Serbs, Croats and Slovenes (from 1929 called Kingdom of Yugoslavia). The western part of the duchy, with the towns of Postojna, Ilirska Bistrica, Idrija, Vipava, and Šturje, was annexed to Italy in 1920, but was subsequently also included into Yugoslavia in 1945 except for the town of Fusine in Valromana (Weissenfels, before 1919), which remained in Italy.

== Demographics ==
The vast majority of the population were Slovene-speaking. A German-speaking minority existed among the local nobles and those craftsmen, who had settled here as citizens of the major towns. German language islands were found in Lower Carniolan Gottschee County, where the rural population spoke Gottscheerish (Granish), a Southern Bavarian dialect, as well as around the Upper Carniolan villages of Zgornja Sorica (Oberzarz), Spodnja Sorica (Unterzarz) and Nemški Rovt (Deutschgereuth) in the Bohinj Basin.

In 1846, the population of Carniola included:

- 428,000 Slovenes
- 38,000 Germans

In 1910, the population of Carniola included:

- 520,000 Slovenes
- 28,000 Germans

== Coat of arms and flag ==
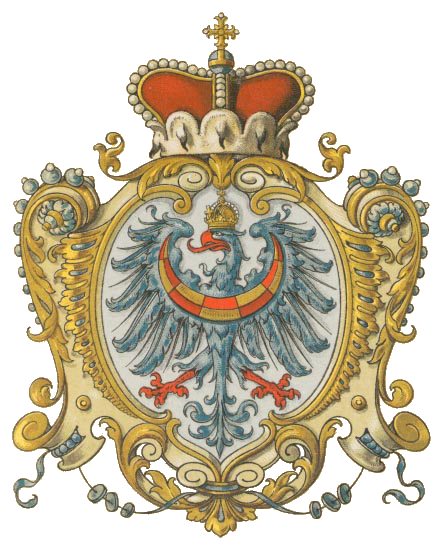
The coat of arms of the Carniolan crown land with archducal hat, as drawn by Hugo Gerard Ströhl (1851–1919)

The coat of arms of Carniola dates back to the 13th century, when it most probably evolved as a combination of the coats of arms of the Bavarian counts of Andechs in the Duchy of Merania (eagle) and the Rhenish House of Sponheim in Carinthia (red-white checkerboard). The eagle is also featured in the seal of King Ottokar II of Bohemia in his capacity as ruler of the Carniolan march in 1269. In 1463 Emperor Frederick III, having prevailed against the claims raised by his brother Albert VI of Austria, added the Imperial crown to the eagle and replaced the white in the shield and the checkered crescent with gold. In 1836 Emperor Ferdinand I of Austria restored the original white color to the shield and recognized the white-blue-red combination as the official Carniolan color scheme.

Under the Habsburg rule the white, blue and red from the Carniolan coat of arms (the shield, the eagle and the crescent) were confirmed as the official flag colors of the crownland in 1848. Since the Duchy of Carniola was the main Slovene-populated region of the Austrian Empire, the color scheme was subsequently accepted as the generic Slovene national tricolor by the inhabitants of other Slovene Lands.

As for the coat of arms, it was abandoned after 1918 with the passing of the Duchy of Carniola. The blue eagle of Carniola was, however, briefly resurrected from 1943 to 1945 as the symbol of the Slovenian auxiliary Axis forces, the Slovene Home Guard. It was also used in the Yugoslav Karađorđević dynasty coat-of-arms in the interwar period (and was replaced in the state coat-of-arms of the Kingdom of Yugoslavia by the three stars of the medieval counts of Celje).

The insignia of the Duchy of Carniola have had an important and lasting impact on Slovene national symbols. Thus, the white-blue-red combination of the flag of the Duchy of Carniola is in use today as the official color scheme of the flag of the Republic of Slovenia. The Slovenian coat of arms is also a heraldic composite, incorporating the stars of the counts of Celje, the Carniolan colors and the silhouette of the Slovene national symbol, Mount Triglav.

== Dukes ==
- Rudolf (1364–1365), also Duke of Austria since 1358, followed by his brothers
  - Albert (1365–1379), jointly with
  - Leopold (1365–1386), progenitor of the Habsburg Leopoldian line, sole Duke of Inner Austria after the 1379 Treaty of Neuberg
- William (1386–1406), son of Leopold, followed by his brother
  - Ernest the Iron (1406–1424), Archduke from 1414
- Frederick (1424–1493), son of Ernest, King of the Romans from 1440 and Holy Roman Emperor from 1452, also Archduke of Austria from 1457
- Maximilian I (1493–1519), son, also Archduke of Austria, Holy Roman Emperor from 1508
- Charles I (1519–1521), grandson, also Archduke of Austria, Emperor-elect from 1520, followed by his brother
  - Ferdinand I (1521–1564), also Archduke of Austria, King of the Romans from 1531, Holy Roman Emperor from 1558
- Charles II (1564–1590), son of Ferdinand, Archduke of Inner Austria upon second partition of the Habsburg lands
- Ferdinand II (1590–1637), son, also Archduke of Austria and Holy Roman Emperor from 1619

Heir of all Habsburg lines in 1619. See List of rulers of Austria for details.

== See also ==
- Carniola
- Slovene dialects
- Gottschee County
- Flag of Slovenia
- History of Slovenia
