= Alpine Wall =

Italian defensive fortifications

- Northern Italy
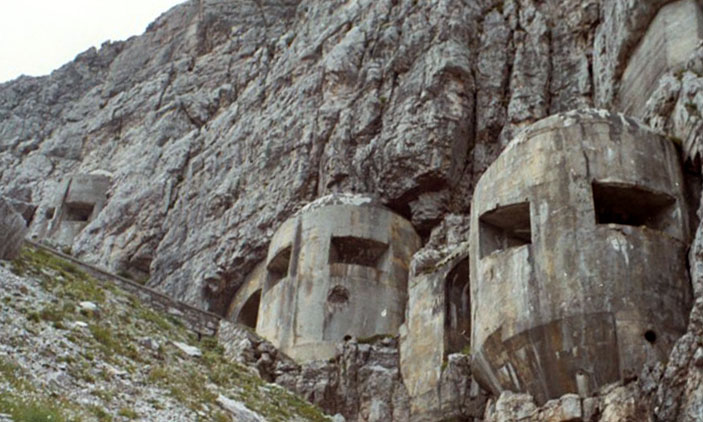
- Opera Croda Sovra i Colsei, on the Passo Monte Croce Comelico.

Site information
- Type: Defensive line
- Controlled by: Italy

Site history
- Built: 1930–42
- In use: 1935–91
- Materials: Concrete, steel

The Alpine Wall (Vallo Alpino) was an Italian system of fortifications along the 1,851 km (1,150 mi) of Italy's northern frontier. Built in the years leading up to World War II at the direction of Italian dictator Benito Mussolini, the defensive line faced France, Switzerland, Austria, and Yugoslavia. It was defended by the "Guardia alla Frontiera" (GaF), Italian special troops.

== Characteristics ==
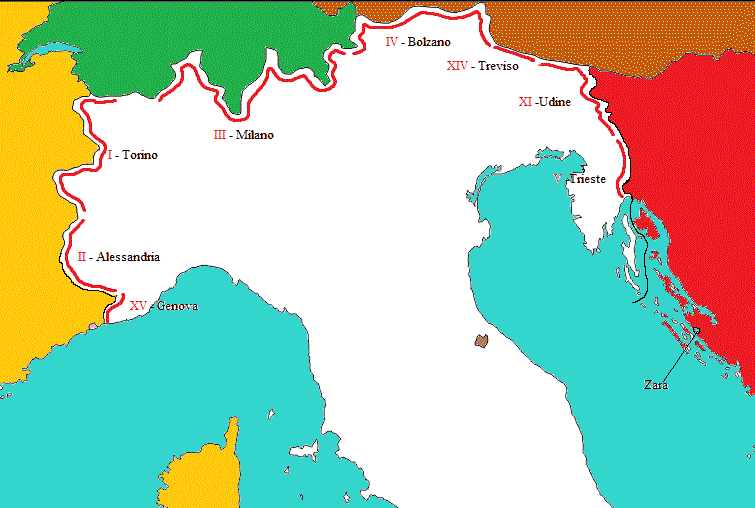
Red line shows approximately the "Vallo Alpino", with the GaF troop units

The Alpine line was similar in concept to other fortifications of the same era, including the Maginot Line of France, the Siegfried Line of Germany, and the National Redoubt of Switzerland.

Italy's land frontiers were in most places mountainous and easily defended, but in the years leading up to World War II, Italy's relations with its neighbours were uneasy. Even in its dealings with its German ally, Italy was concerned about German ambitions towards the province of South Tyrol, inhabited by a German majority.

Due to the rugged nature of the Alpine frontier, defences were confined to passes and observation posts in accessible locations.

== History ==
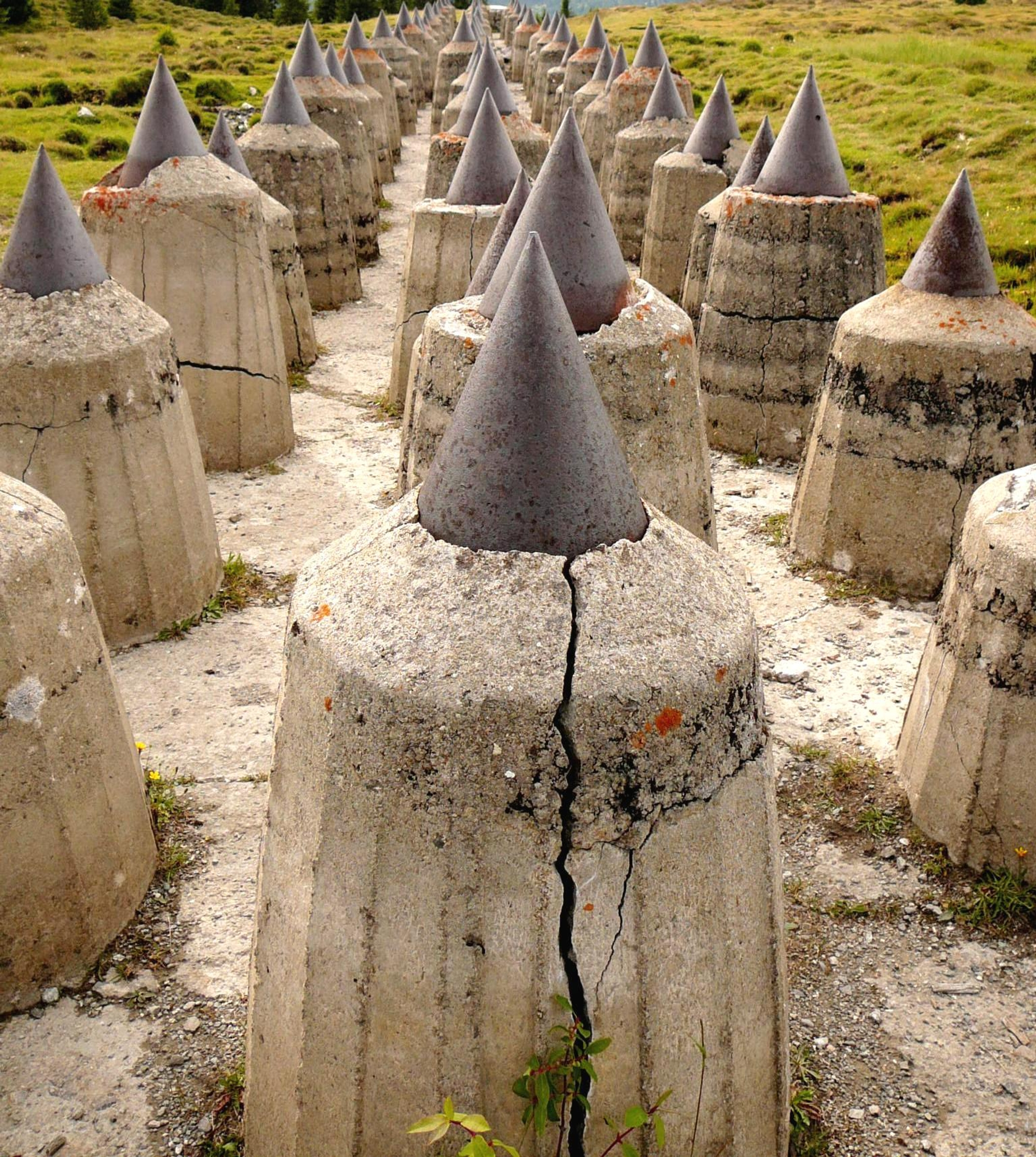
Denti di Drago near Graun im Vinschgau.

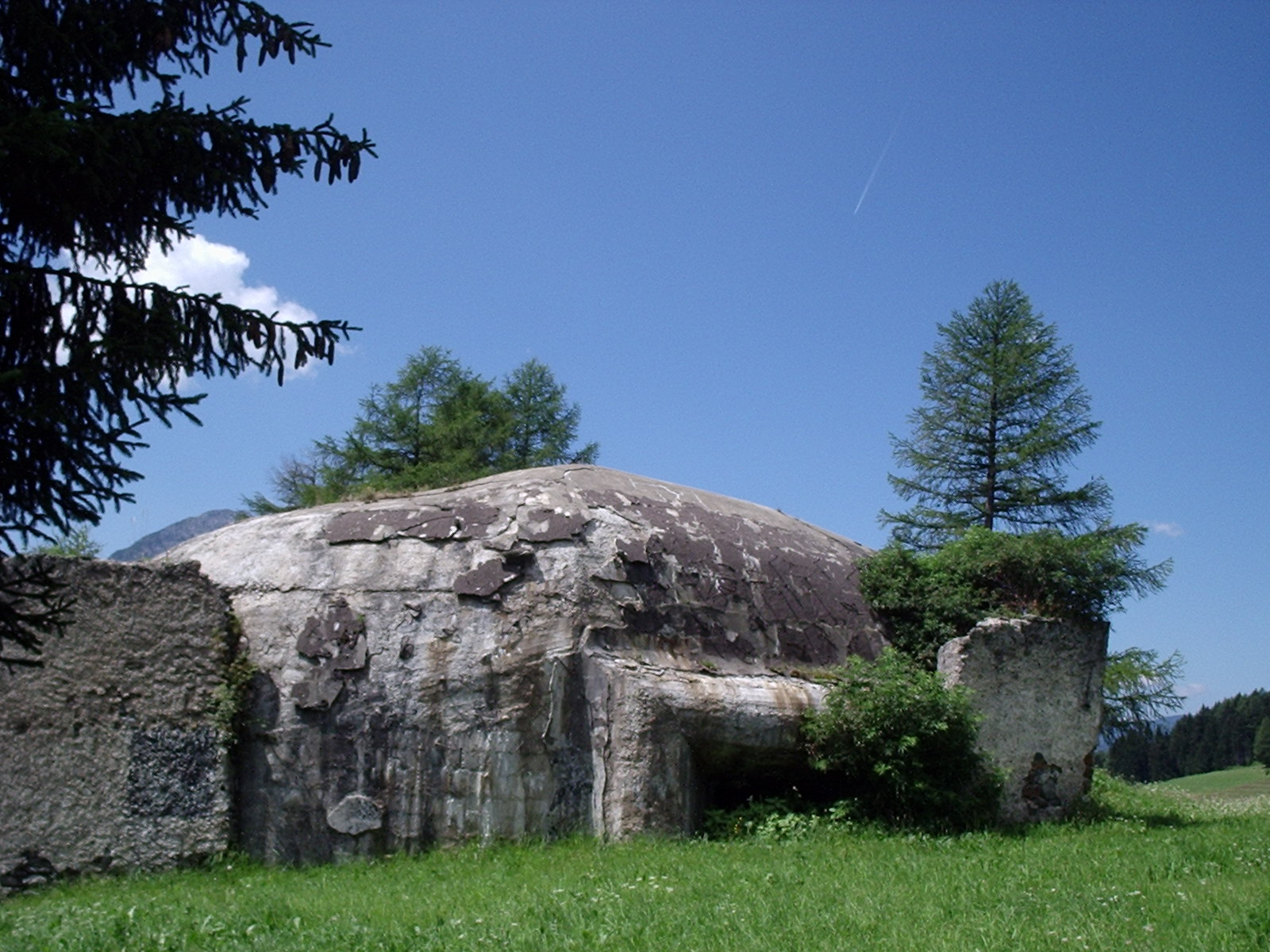
Bunker 9 near Toblach.

Work on the Alpine Wall began in 1931, intended to cover an arc from the Mediterranean coast at Ventimiglia in the west to Fiume on the Adriatic coast in the east. (See Italian Fortifications of Rijeka for more info on the eastern end of the Alpine Line) Three zones were designated at increasing distances from the frontier:

- "Zone of Security": Initial contact with the enemy.
- "Zone of Resistance": Heavier fortifications capable of resistance in isolation, such as the Type 200 artillery forts.
- "Zone of Alignment": Assembly area for counterattack, into which the enemy was to be directed.

Three types of fortifications were provided:

- "Type A": The largest fortifications, generally built into mountainsides.
- "Type B": Smaller point-defence fortifications.
- "Type C": Widely distributed shelters and rallying points

The work, which was carried out in secrecy using Italian labor, was a significant economic burden, resulting in 208 installations with 647 machine guns and fifty artillery pieces. Construction continued until 1942; a report by General Vittorio Ambrosio on 3 October 1942 recorded that 1,475 bunkers had been completed and 450 more were under construction. The forts were armed with a mixture of new weaponry and older equipment from World War I. Provisions were made to deal with the use of poison gas. Much of the armour was obtained from Germany in compensation for Italian military ventures on behalf of the Axis.

=== The Alpine Wall during World War II ===
Little use was made of the Alpine Wall during World War II. During the Italian invasion of France in 1940, some western forts such as Fort Mont Chaberton exchanged fire with their French counterparts of the Alpine Line. Chaberton was hit by well-hidden French 280mm field mortars on 21 June, suffered disabling damage and the whole mountain was annexed by France in 1947. In addition, some Alpine Wall fortifications were used defensively by Italian and German forces during the Second Battle of the Alps in 1944.

=== After World War II ===
At the end of the conflict, some of the western fortifications were destroyed. In the east former Austro-Hungarian territories that Italy acquired with the London treaty of 1915 were in 1947 awarded to Yugoslavia. Consequently, the entire eastern part of the pre-WW2 fortifications were thus on the Yugoslav side and are now on Slovenian territory. The 1947 Paris Peace Treaty forbade the construction or expansion of fortifications within twenty kilometers of the border.

However, with Italy's membership in NATO, construction began on a new defensive line from Austria to the Adriatic along the Yugoslavian border along the Natisone and Tagliamento rivers. The new line used tank turrets in a manner similar to German defences during the previous conflict, allowing 360-degree traverse and a high rate of fire. By 1976 this system was still considered useful in any type of conflict short of a nuclear war.

=== Abandonment ===
The end of the Cold War brought an end to the usefulness of the Alpine Wall. The emplacements were partially stripped and sealed in 1991-1992. Only some active fortifications have been preserved.

== Arrangement ==
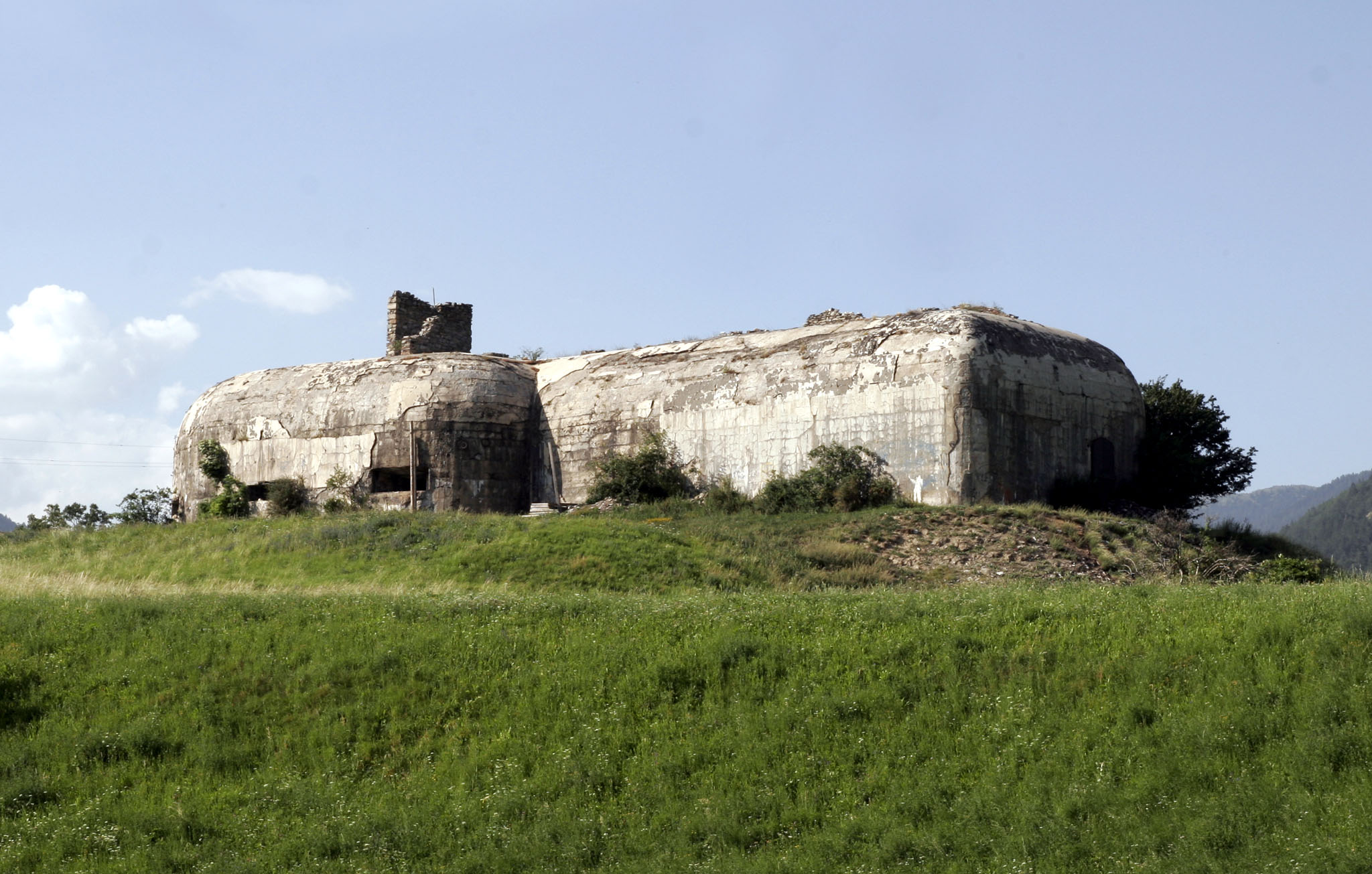
The bunker n. 13 near Malles Venosta.

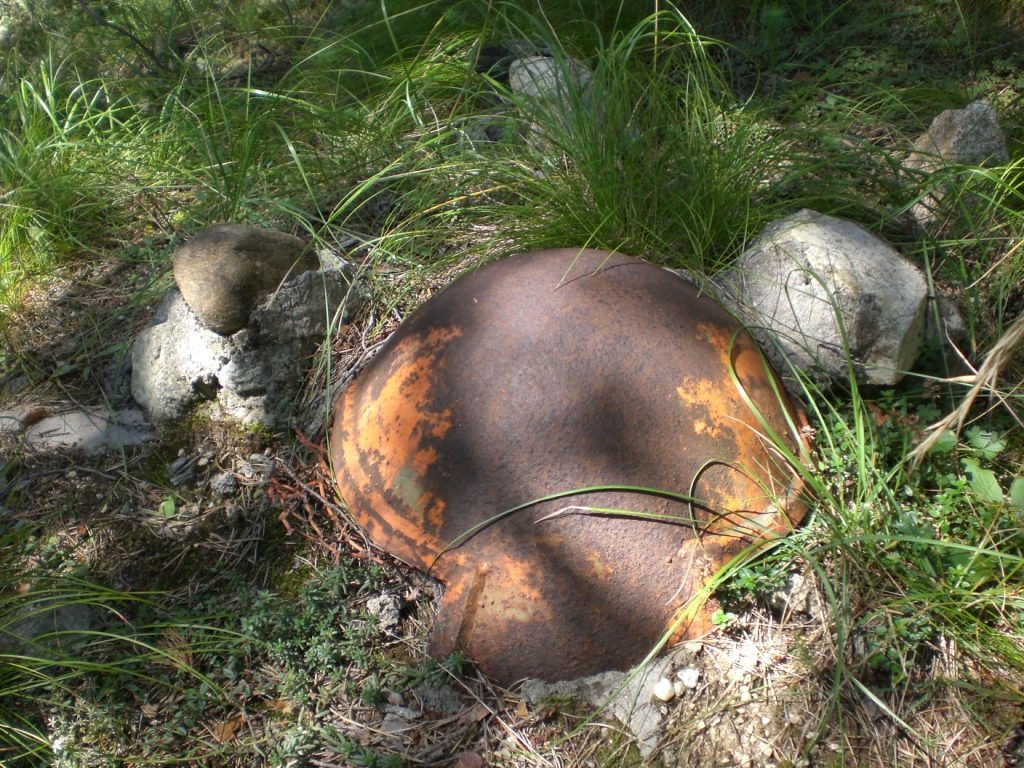
The air cupola on the top of a bunker.

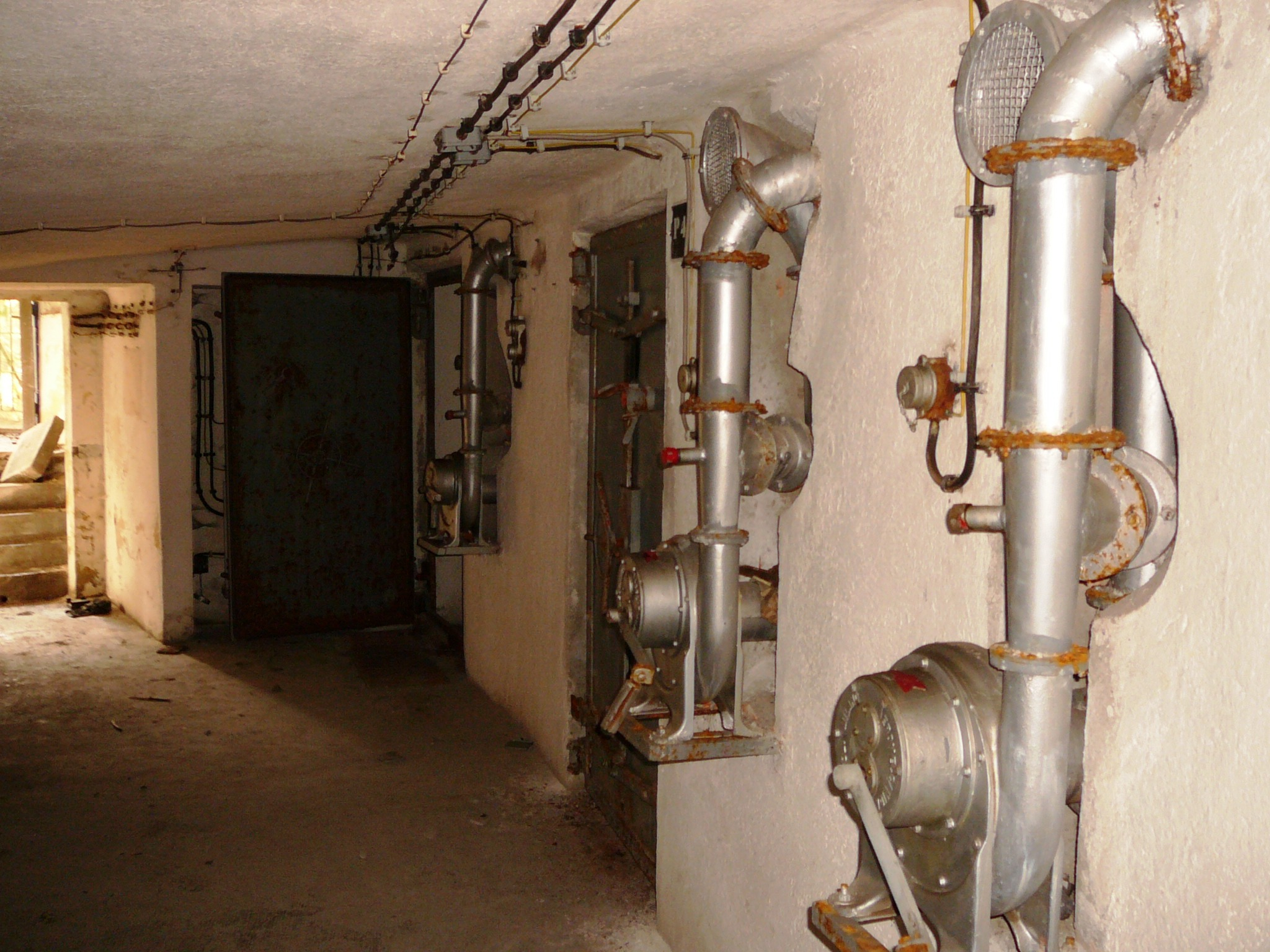
The manual fan in the bunker n. 5 near Vipiteno.

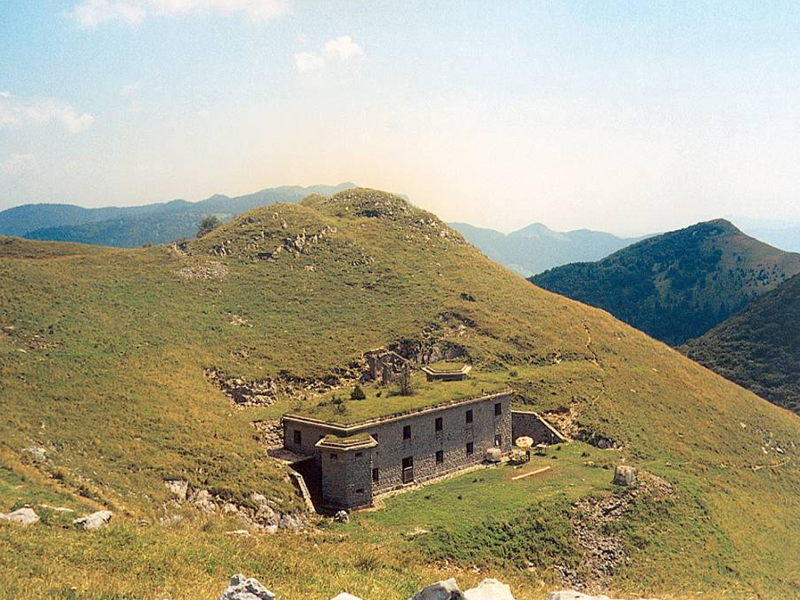
An Alpine Wall fortification in Zgornja Sorica, Slovenia

The fortifications were primarily constructed in the flanking heights of the valleys, with works within the valleys only where they were sufficiently wide. Anti-tank guns, artillery and machine guns were trained on prepared fields of fire, with observation stations at higher points. Shelters for infantry were located rearwards. A system of communications links and roads, or for higher locations, ropeways were provided for communication and supply.

=== Fortifications ===
The individual fortifications were typically built in rock on valley sides. Where this was not suitable, concrete was used for protection, with a minimum of openings and three to five metres of concrete thickness. Combat blocks were to the front, with ammunition rooms behind. Underground galleries connected the combat blocks and their support areas, such as the utility rooms, barracks, storage and command centres, with the main entry farthest to the rear. Combat areas were isolated from the rest of the structure by gas-tight doorways. Units built after 1939 were designed to operate independently, cut off from utilities and supplies.

Fortifications were camouflaged so that they appeared to blend with the surroundings, whether doors or embrasures were open or closed. Emergency escape routes were also provided.

=== Armament ===
Armament typically included an anti-tank gun and a number of machine guns. Post-war units used tank turrets.

Usual armament included:

- Machine gun, Fiat 35 in casemate or metal turret
- Machine gun, Breda 30 and Breda M37, for defense of entries to the fortifications
- Gun 57/43 RM mod. 887 on naval mounts
- Gun 75/43, ball mount in 10 cm steel slab
- Gun 47/32
- Mortar 81mm mod. 35
- Flamethrower

Fortifications were usually surrounded by minefields and barbed wire. Where feasible, an anti-tank ditch was provided.

== Guardia alla Frontiera ==
The Vallo Alpino was mainly defended by the 21,000 strong "Guardia alla Frontiera" (G.A.F.), a special Italian corps created in 1937. They defended the 1,851 km (1,150 mi) of northern Italian frontiers with the so-called "Vallo Alpino Occidentale" (487 km (303 mi) with France), "Vallo Alpino Settentrionale" (724 km (450 mi) with Switzerland and 420 km (260 mi) with Austria) and "Vallo Alpino Orientale" (220 km (140 mi) with Yugoslavia).

== See also ==
- Atlantic Wall
- Czechoslovak border fortifications

== Bibliography ==
- (in Italian) Marco Boglione, Le Strade dei Cannoni Blu Edizioni, Torino 2005, ISBN 88-87417-68-7 (in Italian)
- Kauffmann, J.E., Jurga, Robert M. Fortress Europe: European Fortifications of World War II, 1999. ISBN 1-58097-000-1
- (in Italian) Alessandro Bernasconi; Giovanni Muran. Le fortificazioni del Vallo Alpino Littorio in Alto Adige Trento, editore Temi [maggio 1999], 328 pagine. ISBN 88-85114-18-0
- (in Italian) Alessandro Bernasconi; Giovanni Muran. Il testimone di cemento - Le fortificazioni del "Vallo Alpino Littorio" in Cadore, Carnia e Tarvisiano, Udine editore La Nuova Base Editrice [maggio 2009], 498 pagine + CD con allegati storici e tecnici. ISBN 86-329-0394-2
- (in German) Malte Koenig, Vallo del littorio. Die italienischen Verteidigungsanlagen an der Nordfront, in fortifikation. Fachblatt des Studienkreises für Internationales Festungs-, Militaer- und Schutzbauwesen 22 (2008), pp. 87–92.
- (in German) Malte Koenig, Kooperation als Machtkampf. Das faschistische Achsenbuendnis Berlin-Rom im Krieg 1940/41, Cologne 2007, pp. 238–249.
- (in Italian) Josef Urthaler; Christina Niederkofler; Andrea Pozza. Bunker 2a ed., editore Athesia [2005], 2006, 244 pagine. ISBN 88-8266-392-2
