= Italian Fortifications of Rijeka =

Italian Fortifications near Rijeka, Croatia

From 1924 to 1947, the Kingdom of Italy owned the small Adriatic port of Rijeka (Italian: Fiume). The city was partitioned between the Kingdom of Italy and the Kingdom of Yugoslavia, and Italy saw a need to fortify the city against their Slavic neighbor. The fortifications of Rijeka constituted the XXVII sector of the Vallo Alpino (Alpine Wall), an Italian defensive line that stretches around 1,500 km (930 mi) across the Italian frontiers. The Italians didn't trust their Slavic neighbor, as the closest fortification to the Yugoslav border was only 10m. The Italians only controlled territory with a total depth of about 3 km (1.9 mi) north to south, so defense in depth could not be constructed. Many rocky hills and valleys came within Italian ownership, and each was fortified with machine gun emplacements. The Italians were used to placing their artillery forts behind the main defenses, so they would not incorporate many anti-infantry defenses. 2 Type 200 artillery “forts” were built east of Rijeka, however that standard of not having any anti-infantry defenses was disregarded for the lack of space for anti-infantry bunkers. The Type 200 was heavily armed with both heavy and light machine guns because of the lack of bunkers. Most of the armament of the fort was counted in steel domes, because casemates would be too easy to spot in the rocky terrain. Whenever casemates were built, they were built with reinforced concrete, steel plates, and steel girders. Heavy Italian forts stopped appearing after 1935 due to the steel embargo imposed by the League of Nations. The Type 200s were built around 1932–33, which is why they are so heavily armored. A Type 15000 fort was also built, but it was very shoddy, and most of the firing positions were constructed out of low-grade concrete. Many of the observation domes and firing positions were hard to reach, and the tunnels connecting them were unreinforced and often very narrow.

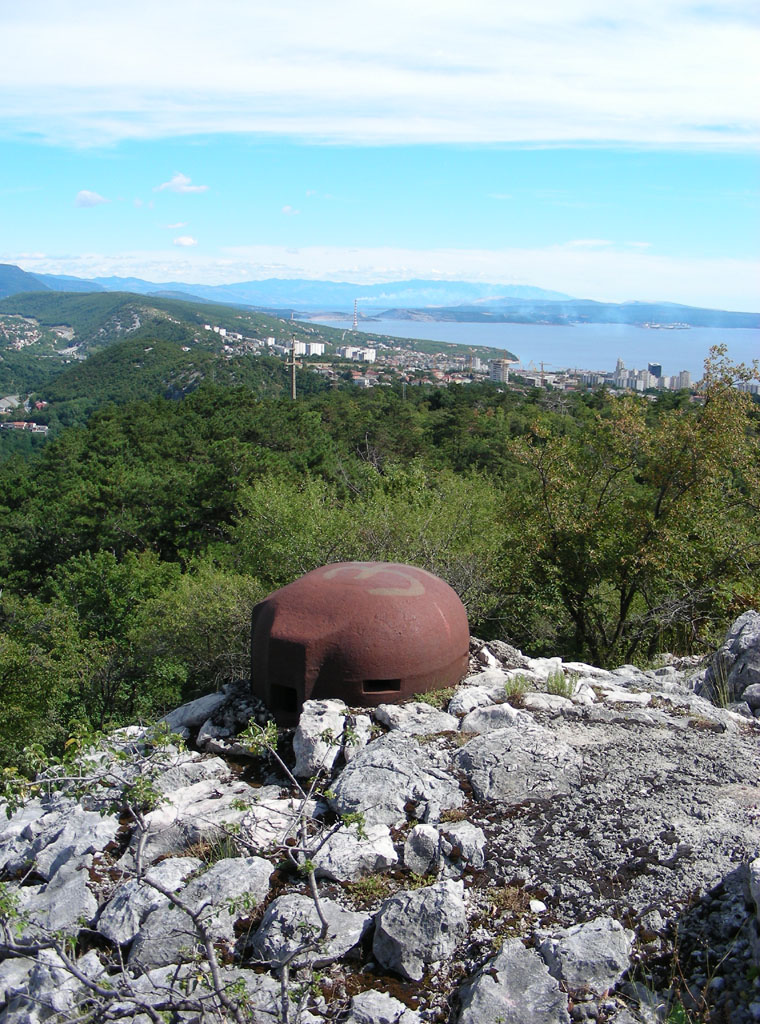
A 3-embrasure armored dome from S. Caterina A.

Only 3 forts and a few smaller works were constructed before the fall of Yugoslavia in April 1941. After the fall of Yugoslavia, the Italians began constructing fortifications in former Yugoslav territory, strengthening the defenses of Rijeka. After the capitulation of Italy in Sept. 1943, German forces occupied the city for 20 months, and the city was recaptured by Yugoslav partisans on May 3, 1945. After World War II, the fortifications fell into disrepair, as the Yugoslavs didn't use them.

== Monte Lesco ==
Fort Monte Lesco, also called Veli Vrh, is situated on a hill east of Rijeka overlooking the town. There is only 1 entrance to the remains of the fort, and it seems quite improvised, as it is made out of stone, and the entrance isn't uniform. The tunnel system connecting each firing position is quite deep underground, so there are many steps leading up to the firing positions. The complex was armed with 8 Fiat–Revelli Modello 1935 heavy machine guns, most of which were in armored casemates. 3 out of the 8 HMGs were in casemates, with the other 5 in armored domes. The complex was also equipped with an armored observation dome. Only ⅓ of all firing positions were in tactically suitable spots, i.e. flat ground, good camouflage etc. The complex itself has very large barracks rooms, most likely to house regular infantry for the defense of the area. Several foundations remain above the complex, most likely from supply buildings.

== S. Catarina A ==
S. Catarina A, also called SV. Katarina A, is a heavily armed Type 200 artillery fort which is entirely underground. The fort was built in 2 parts, parts 1 and 2. Most of the fort is underground, with only the entrances and firing positions sticking up above the surface. Many of the heavy machine guns were emplaced in armored domes, which were made in a Fiat factory in Turin. Most of the firing positions were camouflaged by blending them in with the terrain, as well as conventionally camouflaging them. The complex was also equipped with 2 steel observation domes, 1 in each part of the fort. The total length of the fort is around 1000m (1 km) long, and the passage that connects the 2 parts together is 160m long. Caterina was also equipped with barracks that could house troops for an extended amount of time. Each entrance was sealed with a gas-proof steel door and the whole complex was ventilated through an external filter. The amenities of the fort included a water storage tank, generator, kitchen, and a spotlight for optical communication with the nearby fortifications.

In the last days of World War II, the fortifications were used by retreating German forces as they abandoned the area. The numerous pockmarks seen on the concrete bunkers are from Yugoslav machine guns and light artillery. After the war, the bunkers were abandoned and sealed off from the public. Many people only learned about them after the fall of Yugoslavia in 1991. Since it has been abandoned for nearly 80 years, Fort Caterina is a bit dilapidated, with certain parts unsafe to visit. These are small isolated spots however, most of the fort can be safely viewed today.

Armament of Part 1.

- Light and heavy machine guns in 6 concrete bunkers
- 2 concrete bunkers with 3 firing embrasures, although they only had 1 MG each
- 1 rotatable steel dome with 1 heavy machine gun
- 2 heavy machine gun bunkers with 20 cm of steel armor
- 1 observation dome that could also house a light machine gun

Armament of Part 2.

- Light and heavy machine guns in 6 concrete bunkers
- 2 75mm guns in steel half-turrets, the turrets themselves weighed 39 metric tons (38 Imperial tons). The turrets were manufactured at the Vanzetti foundry in Milan, and were the heaviest single object used in constructing the Alpine Line.

== S. Caterina B ==
S. Caterina B, also called SV. Katarina B, is a Circular 200 (Type 200) artillery fort, and is 1 of 2 that were built by the Italians around Rijeka. The fort was split into 2 parts, “Left” (East) and “Right” (West). The fort is mainly underground, and has 12 firing positions that protrude above the surface. The fort was built with the utmost secrecy, and civilians weren't allowed anywhere near it. The central part of the fort was a rough rectangular shape with tunnels shooting off to each firing position. The total length of the tunnels is around 790m, including the tunnels to the firing positions. The designers evidently thought the fort would come under siege because it is equipped to garrison troops for a long time. The amenities include a kitchen, generator room, water storage tank, and numerous ammo and food supply rooms. The fort had gas-tight doors and a ventilation system that filtered outside air and removed harmful gasses from the firing positions. On the “Right” side of SV. Katerina B is a firing embrasure meant for a light machine gun, whose purpose was to cover the external entrance. On the south side of the fort was a so-called “Central Observatory” which gave spotting data to the firing positions and directed their fire. The concrete roof was 50 cm thick and was heavily reinforced with steel; the armored dome is located 14m above the main part of the fort. Many of the firing positions were camouflaged using the local terrain as well as the conventional ways of camouflage. The domes in which the guns were emplaced weighed tens of tons each, and since the fort sat inside a rocky hill, it was very difficult to place them. During the Battle of Rijeka in the closing days of World War II, the retreating Germans occupied SV Caterina to try and stop the Yugoslav partisans from taking the city. The numerous pockmarks are from Yugoslav machine gun and light artillery fire. After the war, the fort was declared off-limits by the Yugoslav government and was abandoned. Much of the public didn't know of the fort's existence until the fall of Yugoslavia in 1991. Despite being abandoned for nearly 80 years, the fort is in remarkable condition, as the only signs of aging are moisture and a few cracks.

Armament of the “Left” (East) Side

- 2 75mm guns in armored half-domes, each half-dome weighed 39 metric tons (38 Imperial tons). The half-domes were made at the Milan Steelworks in Northern Italy.
- 1 armored dome with 4 firing embrasures, the dome was armed with 2 heavy machine guns.
- 1 armored dome for a single heavy machine gun
- 1 heavy machine gun in a concrete bunker
- 1 observation dome that could mount a light machine gun

Armament of the “Right” (West) Side

- 2 75mm guns in armored half-domes, they are just like the ones on the other side of the fort.
- 1 armored dome with 4 firing embrasures, the dome was armed with 2 heavy machine guns.
- 1 armored dome for a single heavy machine gun
- 1 heavy machine gun in a concrete bunker
- 1 observation dome that could mount a light machine gun

== Vezica Bunker I ==
Vezica Bunker I was constructed by the Italians after the defeat of Yugoslavia in April 1941. The bunker is a so-called “Circular 7000” (Type 7000). Unlike one of the other Circular 7000s nearby, SV. Sveti Kriz, Bunker I was mostly exposed. The bunker was armed with 2 heavy machine guns and an anti-tank gun. There was also an observer who sat to the right of the anti-tank gunner. From the same room the observer could control who came in and out via a small-arms embrasure. The total area of the bunker was around 50m.

== Vezica Bunker II ==
Vezica Bunker II was constructed by the Italians after the defeat of Yugoslavia in April 1941, after the Italians acquired Susak. The bunker is a derivative of the “Circular 7000” (Type 7000) Italian bunker design. While most Circular 7000 are mostly underground, Bunker II is mostly aboveground. BunkerII is like Bunker I, but is a little larger and heavier armed. The bunker was supposedly armed with 3 heavy machine guns and an anti-tank gun, but the diagram doesn't show an anti-tank gun firing position. The bunker also had 3 small-arms embrasures, 2 which fired outward, and 1 which controlled the main entrance. Most of the bunker was camouflaged using local stone so the bunker wasn't immediately noticeable. The bunker never saw combat and many never knew it existed until the fall of Yugoslavia in 1991. Evidently, someone knew it was there because they lived in it for a long time. The bunker is well preserved, as there are no major cracks or decay. Today you can visit the bunker, however there is a large steel door block entry. However, you can visit the roof of the bunker which has a good view over a river and highway below.

== Unfinished fortifications ==
SV. Sveti Kriz

Fort Sveti Kriz dates from 1941, and was part of the Italian fortifications constructed after the defeat of Yugoslavia in April 1941. The bunker complex is called a Circular 7000, and is mainly located belowground. The Italians poured concrete where necessary and used the terrain to blend in most of the firing positions. The complex was not finished before the Italians surrendered in Sept. 1943, and the Germans occupied the remains of the unfinished battery as they retreated in April 1945. During the 1980s and 90s, local children would play in the fort.

Fort Drenova

Fort Drenova was in the process of being built when Italy capitulated in Sept. 1943. When German forces occupied the area, they didn't bother to finish the structure, and it ended the war incomplete. Many of the planned tunnels were built and bricked up, but the firing positions were still in the basic stages of being created when the fort was abandoned. The many years of abandonment have allowed the fort to dilapidate, as parts of it face imminent collapse. However the unfinished firing positions can be visited safely. Trash inside the fort indicates children have used it as a playground.

Fort Trsat

Fort Trsat was constructed after the defeat of Yugoslavia in April 1941, and is located in the town of Trsat, near Sisak. The fort is what is called a “Circular 7000” (Type 7000), but was never finished. The fort is mainly underground, and only the 4 exits protrude above the surface. Since there is no real evidence of positions for machine gun domes, it is most likely that the fort was a supply depot and armory. Today, the fort lies on land owned by the Shrine of Our Lady of Trsat, which is a Francisian sanctuary. The fort is relatively well preserved, and since 2010, all 4 entrances have been locked by steel doors. Only 1 part of the fort is in danger of collapse, despite being abandoned for more than 80 years. In 2010, the Ministry of Culture declared Fort Trsat a property of cultural heritage, which makes the fort one of the only Italian fortifications near Rijeka to be a protected site.

== Small fortifications ==
Grobnik

Near today's E65 highway are several Italian bunkers constructed on a hill. 1 bunker was a machine gun bunker with 3 firing embrasures, while the other was a combined anti-tank and machine gun bunker. Both were constructed out of concrete, but were camouflaged with local stone.

Grobnik Airfield

Grobnik Airfield, sometimes called Robnok Airfield, was the chief Italian airport for Rijeka during the 1920s and ‘30s. The airfield was also responsible for housing the Italian air force stationed in Rijeka. Since it was the airbase for the Italian air force stationed in Rijeka, the heights surrounding the airfield were fortified with small concrete bunkers. The Italians also built a command post for the airforce near the main runway. In July 1942, the airfield was the site of the Podhum Massacre, where 118 Croat civilians were shot for being suspected partisans. When Italy capitulated in Sept. 1943, Partisans took control of the airfield, but found all aircraft but a Fieseler Storch and a Caproni Ca.135 medium bomber had been evacuated. The partisans held the airfield till the end of the war, despite desperate German attempts to seize the airfield in April 1945, during the Battle of Rijeka. After the war, the concrete bunkers surrounding the airfield were demolished. The command center remains standing, but without its roof.
