= Zgornja Sorica =

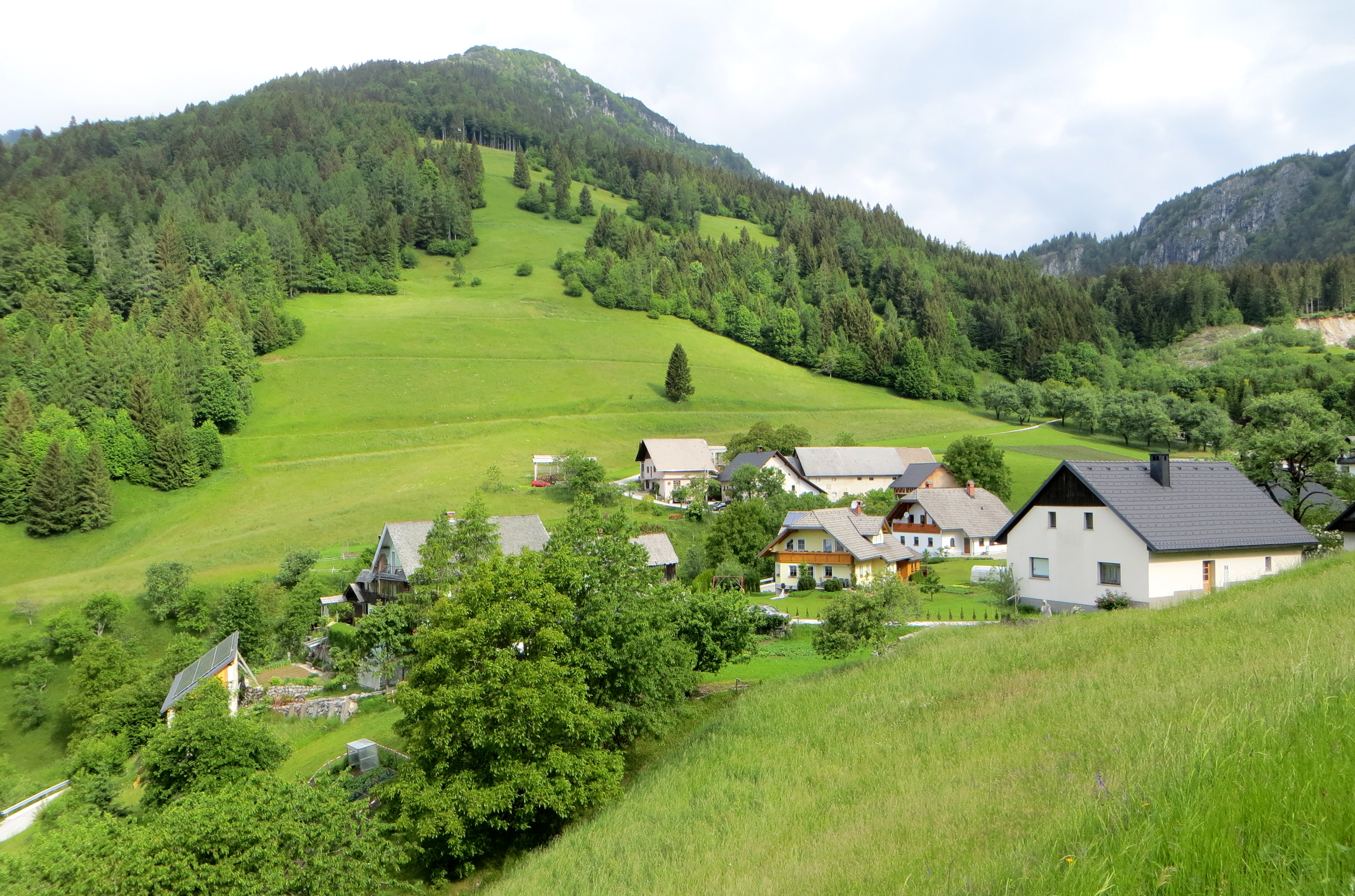

- Location in Slovenia
- Coordinates: 46°13′25.67″N 14°1′44.16″E
- Country: Slovenia
- Traditional Region: Upper Carniola
- Statistical region: Upper Carniola
- Municipality: Železniki

Area
  - Total: 12.038 km^{2} (4.648 sq mi)
- Elevation: 859.8 m (2,821 ft)

Population (2026)
  - Total: 157
  - Density: 13/km^{2} (34/sq mi)

Zgornja Sorica (pronounced [ˈzɡoːɾnja ˈsoːɾitsa]; German: Oberzarz) is a village in the Municipality of Železniki in the Upper Carniola region of Slovenia. In January 2026, the population was 157.

Zgornja Sorica together with neighbouring Spodnja Sorica (Unterzarz), like Nemški Rovt (Deutschgereuth) in Bohinj and Rut (Deutschruth), is part of a former German language island in a remote valley of the Julian Alps. In medieval times, the Carniolan estates around Škofja Loka were held by the Bavarian Bishops of Freising, who from about 1200 had the Zarz region settled with peasants descending from their territory in the Upper Puster Valley (around Innichen) in Tyrol. The local Southern Bavarian dialect had strong similarities to the dialect spoken in the Puster Valley; however, it died out by the early 20th century.
