= Southern Bavarian =

Cluster of Upper German dialects

- Südbairisch
- Native to: Austria (Tyrol, Carinthia, Upper Styria); Italy (South Tyrol); Germany (Werdenfelser Land); Switzerland (Samnaun); Brazil (Treze Tílias), United States, Canada
- Language family: Indo-European: Germanic; West Germanic; High German; Upper German; Bavarian; Southern Bavarian
- Writing system: Latin (German alphabet)

Language codes
- ISO 639-3: –
- Glottolog: sout2632 South Bavarian glob1242 Global South Bavarian
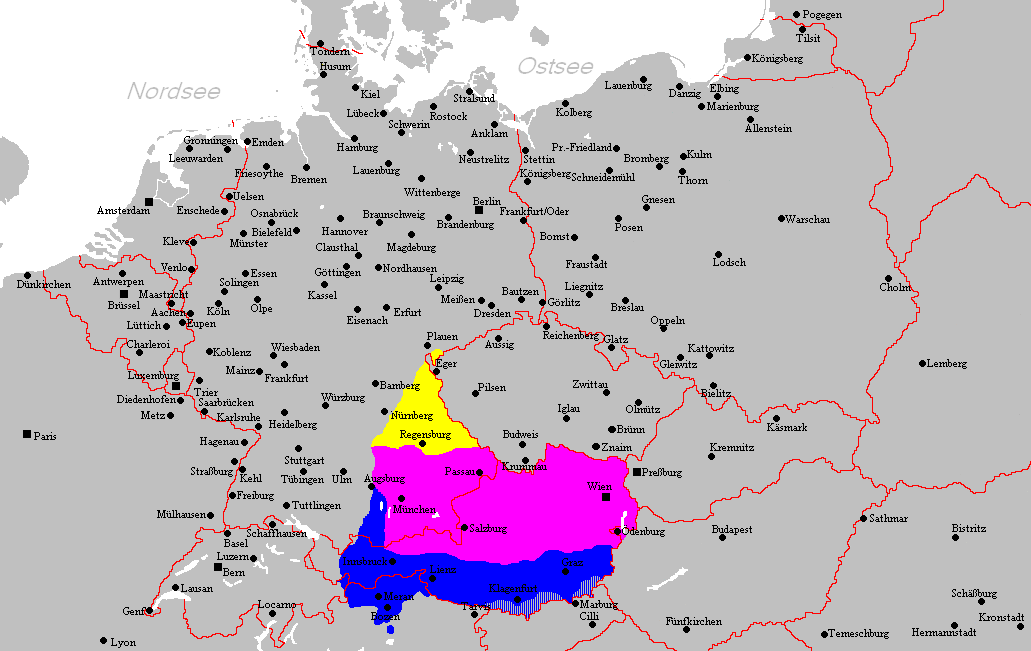
- Bavarian dialects after 1945 and the expulsions of the Germans Southern Bavarian

Southern Bavarian or South Bavarian, is a cluster of Upper German dialects of the Bavarian group. They are primarily spoken in Tyrol (i.e. the Austrian state of Tyrol and the Italian province of South Tyrol), in Carinthia and in the western parts of Upper Styria. Before 1945 and the expulsions of the Germans, it was also spoken in speech islands in Italy and Yugoslavia. Due to these Alpine regions, many features of the Old Bavarian language from the Middle High German period have been preserved. On the other hand, the Southern Bavarian dialect area is influenced by the Rhaeto-Romance languages, locally also Slovene and to a lesser extent Italian.

The speech area historically included the former linguistic enclaves in Carniola (present-day Slovenia) around Kočevje in the Gottschee region (Gottscheerish), Sorica (Zarz) and Nemški Rovt (Deutsch Ruth). The Cimbrian language still spoken in several language-islands in north-eastern Italy (Friuli, Veneto and Trentino) mostly counts as a separate Bavarian language variant. Southern Bavarian is also spoken in the Werdenfelser Land region around Mittenwald and Garmisch-Partenkirchen in German Upper Bavaria.

The Tyrolean Unterland, the Alpine regions of Salzburg (Pinzgau, Pongau and Lungau), as well as the adjacent parts of Styria and southern Burgenland form the dialect continuum with the Central Bavarian language area in the north.

== Phonology ==
=== Vowels ===
Southern Bavarian has 8 vowels:

	Front	Back	
	Unrounded	Unrounded	Rounded
Close	i	ɯ	
Close-mid	e	ɤ	
Open-mid	ɛ	ʌ	
Open	a		ɒ

=== Consonants ===
Southern Bavarian has about 33 consonants:

	Bilabial		Labiodental		Alveolar		Postalveolar		Palatal		Velar		Glottal
Plosive	p	b̥			t	d̥					k	ɡ̊	
Nasal		m				n						ŋ	
Fricative	β, β̬		f	v̥	s	z̥	ʃ	ʒ̊	ç	ʝ	x	ɣ̊	h
Affricate	p͡f	b̥͡v̥			t͡s	d̥͡z̥	t͡ʃ	d̥͡ʒ̥				ɡ̊͡ɣ̊	
Trill						r							
Approximant						l, lʲ				j			

== See also ==
- Hutterite German
- Mòcheno language
