= Bavarian language =

Group of German varieties

Bavarian
- Austro-Bavarian
- Boarisch; Bairisch
- Region: Bavaria (Germany); Austria; South Tyrol (Italy)
- Ethnicity: Bavarians; Austrians; South Tyroleans
- Native speakers: 15 million (2012)
- Language family: Indo-European: Germanic; West Germanic; High German; Upper German; Bavarian
- Dialects: Northern; Central; Southern
- Writing system: Latin alphabet, Marcomannic (historically)

Language codes
- ISO 639-3: bar
- Glottolog: baye1239 Bairisch bava1246 Bavarian
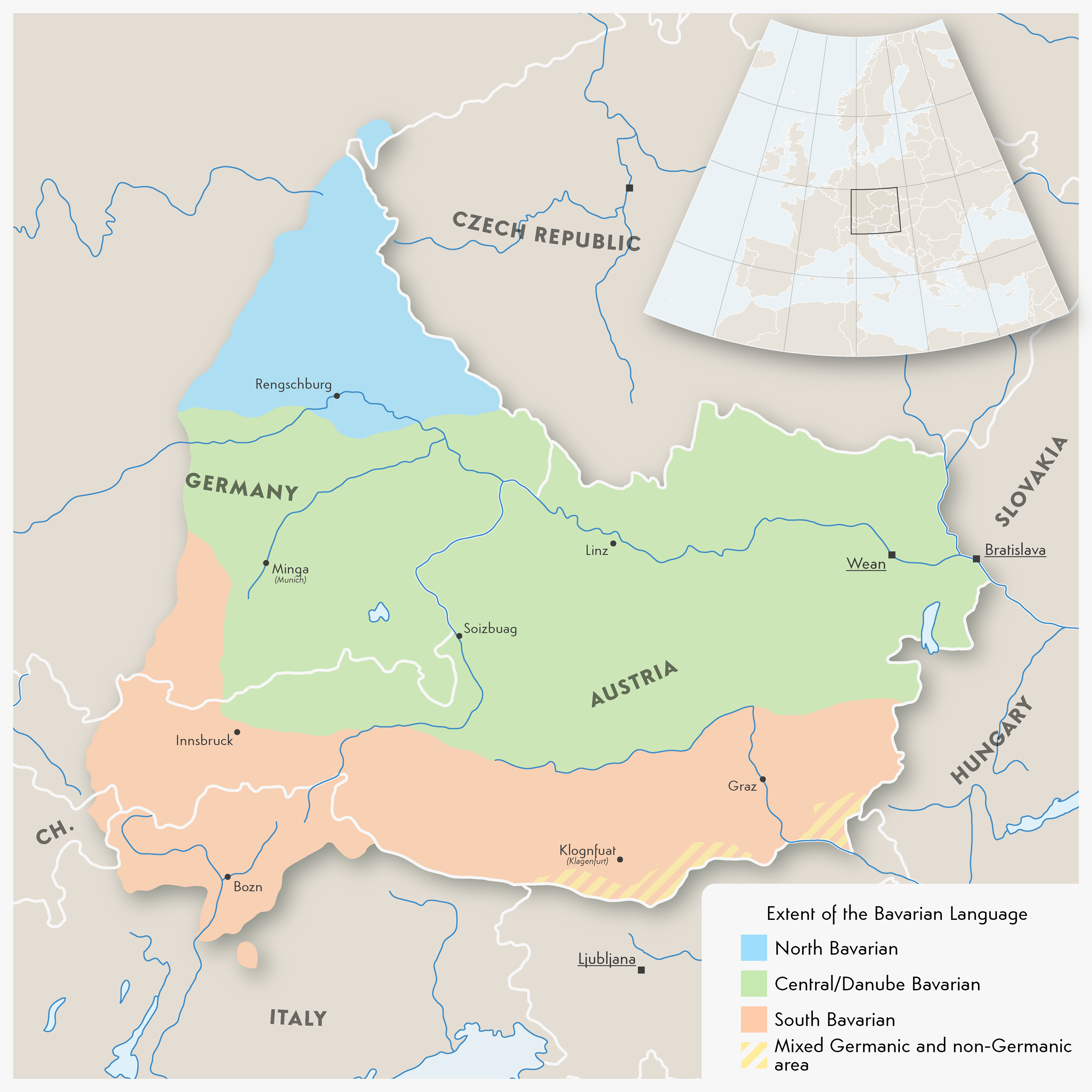
- Extent of Bavarian

- Bavarian is classified as Vulnerable by the UNESCO Atlas of the World's Languages in Danger.

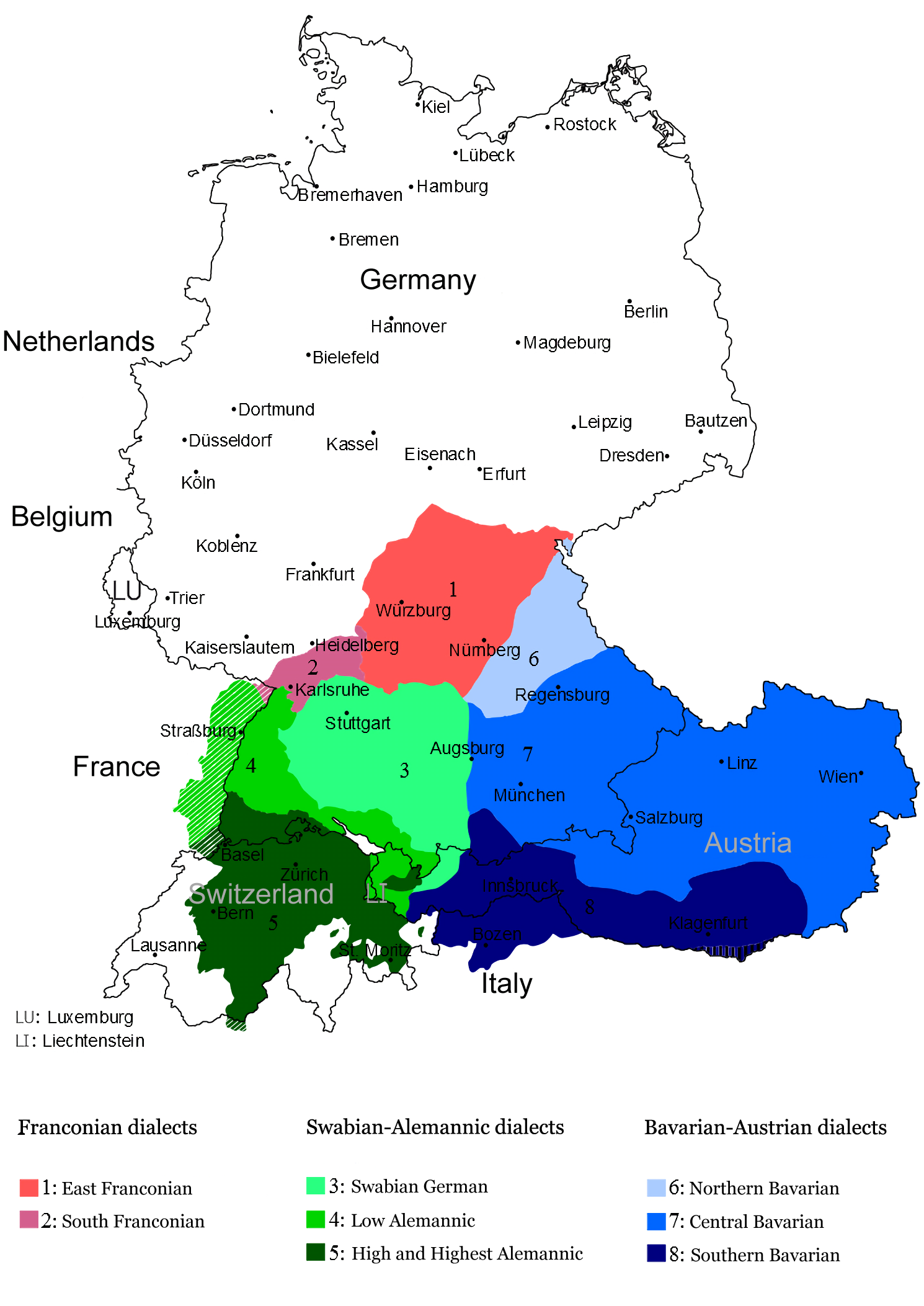
Upper German language area after 1945: blue: Bavarian-Austrian dialects

A woman speaking Bavarian

Bavarian (Boarisch or Bairisch; German: Bayrisch [ˈbaɪʁɪʃ]), alternately Austro-Bavarian, is a group of Upper German varieties spoken in the south-east of the German language area, including the German state of Bavaria, most of Austria, and South Tyrol in Italy. Prior to 1945, Bavarian was also prevalent in parts of the southern Sudetenland and western Hungary. Bavarian is spoken by approximately 12 million people in an area of around 125,000 square kilometres (48,000 sq mi), making it the largest of all German dialects. In 2008, 45 percent of Bavarians claimed to use only dialect in everyday communication.

== Language or dialect ==
Bavarian is generally considered to be a dialect of German, but many sources classify it as a separate language: the International Organization for Standardization has assigned a unique ISO 639-3 language code (bar), the Glottolog has given separate language code (bava1246) and the UNESCO lists Bavarian in the Atlas of the World's Languages in Danger since 2009; however, the classification of Bavarian as an individual language has been criticized by some scholars of Bavarian.

Reasons why Bavarian can be viewed as a dialect of German include the perception of its speakers, the lack of standardization, the traditional use of Standard German as a roofing language, the relative closeness to German which does not justify Bavarian to be viewed as an abstand language, or the fact that no country applied for Bavarian to be entered into the European Charter for Regional or Minority Languages.

In spite of all the above reasons, the differences between Bavarian and Standard German are still in greater number than the differences between officially recognized languages such as Czech and Slovak, Danish and some varieties of Norwegian, or Croatian and Serbian.

== Origins ==
=== History and etymology ===
The word Bavarian is derived from the name of the Baiuvarii people who first appeared under this name in Bavaria in the 6th century. The origin of their name is uncertain, but the most common theory reconstructs the word as *Bajowarjōz, meaning 'inhabitants of Boii land'. The Boii were Celtic inhabitants of the area before the Roman conquest, and their name survived.

The local population eventually established the Duchy of Bavaria, forming the south-eastern part of the kingdom of Germany. The Old High German documents from the area of Bavaria are identified as Altbairisch (Old Bavarian), even though at this early date there were few distinctive features that would divide it from Alemannic German.

The dialectal separation of Upper German into East Upper German (Bavarian) and West Upper German (Alemannic) became more tangible in the Middle High German period, from about the 12th century.

== Geographical distribution and dialects ==
- In Europe:
  - In Germany, the language is spoken in Upper Bavaria, Lower Bavaria, the Upper Palatinate, eastern part of Upper Franconia and south, southeast and eastern parts of Middle Franconia in Bavaria. It is also spoken in southern Vogtland, in Saxony;
  - In Austria, except Vorarlberg;
  - In Italy in South Tyrol and a handful of linguistic enclaves of Cimbrian and Carnic people in northern Italy;
  - In Switzerland, it is spoken in the village of Samnaun, in Grisons;
  - In Sopron (Hungary) and surroundings.
- Outside of Europe:
  - In Treze Tílias, Brazil
  - In Pozuzo, Peru
  - In the United States and Canada (Hutterite German)

Three main dialects of Bavarian are:

- Northern Bavarian, mainly spoken in Upper Palatinate, but also in adjacent areas (small parts of Upper Franconia (Wunsiedel district and Bayreuth district), Saxony (southern Vogtland), Middle Franconia, Upper Bavaria and Lower Bavaria).
- Central Bavarian along the main rivers Isar and Danube, spoken in Upper Bavaria (including Munich, which has a standard German-speaking majority), Lower Bavaria, southern Upper Palatinate, the Swabian district of Aichach-Friedberg, the northern parts of the State of Salzburg, Upper Austria, Lower Austria, Vienna (see Viennese German) and the Northern Burgenland.
- Southern Bavarian in Samnaun, Tyrol, South Tyrol, Carinthia, Styria, and the southern parts of Salzburg and Burgenland.

Differences are clearly noticeable within those three subgroups, which in Austria often coincide with the borders of the particular states. For example, each of the accents of Carinthia, Styria, and Tyrol can be easily recognised. Also, there is a marked difference between eastern and western central Bavarian, roughly coinciding with the border between Austria and Bavaria. In addition, the Viennese dialect has some characteristics distinguishing it from all other dialects. In Vienna, minor, but recognizable, variations are characteristic for distinct districts of the city.

Before the expulsion of Germans from Czechoslovakia, the linguistic border of Bavarian with Czech was on the farther side of the Bohemian Forest and its Bohemian foreland was Bavarian-speaking.

Alternatively, there are four main dialects:

- North Bavarian
- Middle Bavarian
- South Middle Bavarian
- South Bavarian

== Use ==
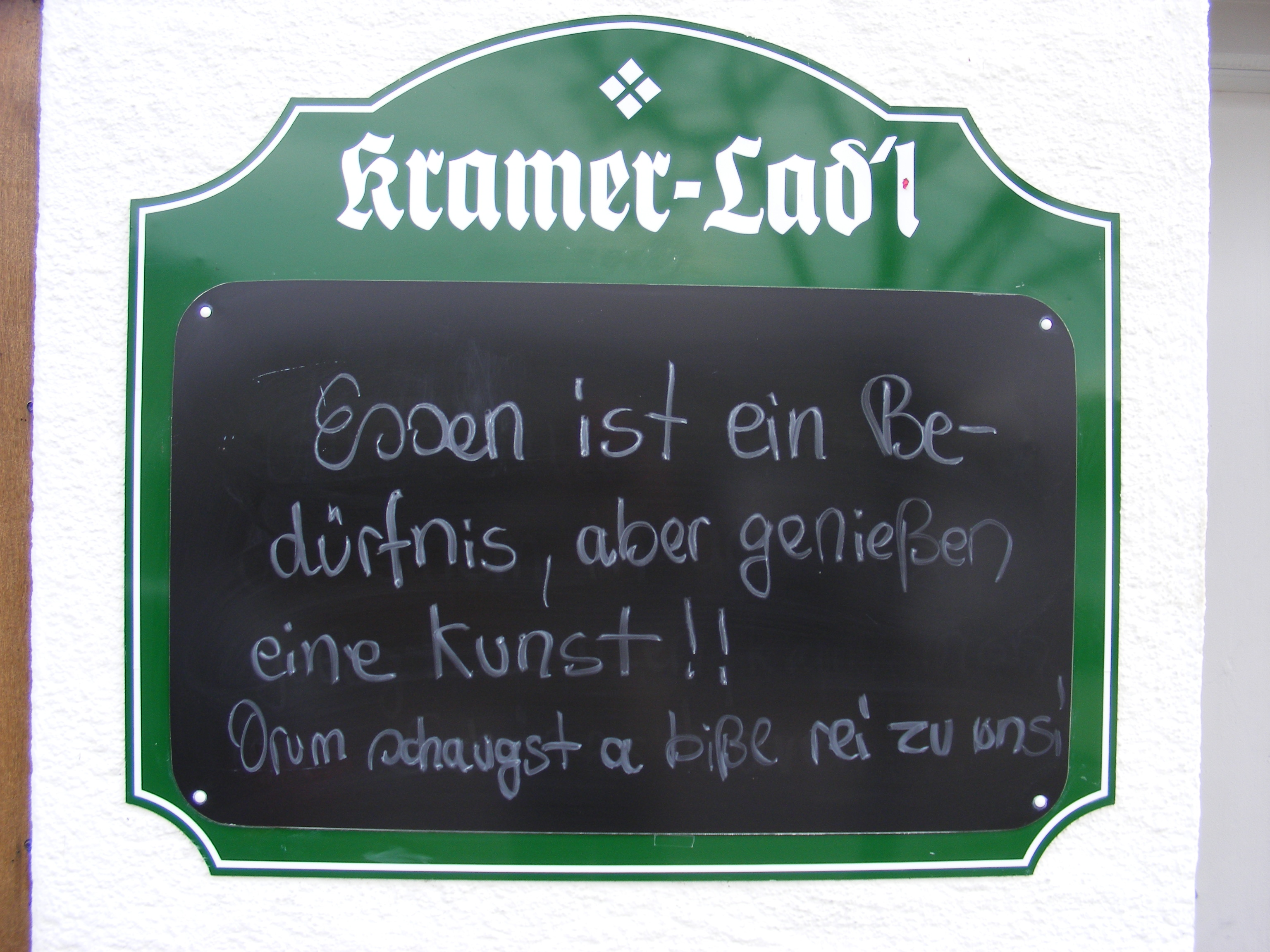
Public sign combining Standard German and Bavarian

Bavarian has no official status in any country or territory. Bavarian differs sufficiently from Standard German to make it difficult for native speakers to adopt standard pronunciation. Educated Bavarians and Austrians can almost always read, write and understand Standard German, but they may have little opportunity to speak it, especially in rural areas. In those regions, Standard German is restricted to use as the language of writing and the media. It is therefore often referred to as Schriftdeutsch ("written German") rather than the usual term Hochdeutsch ("High German" or "Standard German"). Given that Central German and Upper German together comprise the High German languages, out of which the then new, written standard was developed and as opposed to Low German, that is an alternative naming many High German dialect speakers regard justified.

=== School ===
Bavaria and Austria officially use Standard German as the primary medium of education. With the spread of universal education, the exposure of speakers of Bavarian to Standard German has been increasing, and many younger people, especially in the region's cities and larger towns, speak Standard German with only a slight accent. This accent usually only exists in families where Bavarian is spoken regularly. Families that do not use Bavarian at home usually use Standard German instead. In Austria, some parts of grammar and spelling are taught in Standard German lessons. As reading and writing in Bavarian is generally not taught at schools, almost all literate speakers of the language prefer to use Standard German for writing. Regional authors and literature may play a role in education as well, but by and large, Standard German is the lingua franca.

=== Literature ===
Although there exist grammars, vocabularies, and a translation of the Bible in Bavarian, there is no common orthographic standard. Poetry is written in various Bavarian dialects, and many pop songs use the language as well, especially ones belonging to the Austropop wave of the 1970s and 1980s.

Although Bavarian as a spoken language is in daily use in its region, Standard German, often with strong regional influence, is preferred in the mass media.

Ludwig Thoma was a noted German author who wrote works such as Lausbubengeschichten in Bavarian.

=== Web ===
There is a Bavarian Wikipedia. Also, the official FC Bayern Munich website was available in Bavarian.

== Phonology ==
=== Consonants ===
	Labial	Alveolar	Post- alveolar	Palatal	Velar	Glottal
Nasal	m	n			ŋ	
Stop	p b	t d			k ɡ	(ʔ)
Affricate	p͡f	t͡s	t͡ʃ			
Fricative	f v	s	ʃ	(ç)	x	h
Trill		r				
Approximant		l		j		

Notes:

- Aspiration may occur among voiceless plosives in word-initial position.
- The phoneme /h/ is frequently realised as [ç] or [x] word-internally and is realised as [h] word-initially.
- Intervocalic /s/ can be voiced to [z], unless it is fortis (lengthened), such as in /hɔasːn/ 'to be named', compared to /rɔasn/ 'to travel', where the sibilant is lenis.
- Realization of trill sounds varies by dialect. Some (especially those close to the Czech and Swiss border) realize it as a alveolar trill (r) or sometimes tap (ɾ). Others such as almost all southern Bavarian dialects realize either as a Uvular trill (ʀ) or fricative (ʁ).
- Intervocalic /v/ can be realised as [ʋ] or [β, w].
- Some dialects, such as the Bavarian dialect in South Tyrol, realise /k/ as an affricate [k͡x] word-initially and before /m, n, l, r/, which is an extension of the High German consonant shift to velar consonants.

=== Vowels ===
Vowel phonemes in parentheses occur only in certain Bavarian dialects or only appear as allophones or in diphthongs. Nasalization may also be distinguished in some dialects.

	Front		Central	Back	
	unrounded	rounded	Central	Back	
Close	i	y		u	
Near-close	ɪ	ʏ		ʊ	
Close-mid	e	ø	(ə)	o	
Open-mid	ɛ	œ	(ɐ)	ɔ	
Open	(æ)	(ɶ)	a	(ɑ)	ɒ

Bavarian has an extensive vowel inventory, like most Germanic languages. Vowels can be grouped as back rounded, front unrounded and front rounded. They are also traditionally distinguished by length or tenseness.

== Grammar ==
- Northern and Central Bavarian usually have case inflection only for the article. With few exceptions, nouns are not inflected for case.
- The simple past tense is rare in Bavarian and has been retained for only a few verbs, including 'to be' and 'to want'. In general, the perfect is used to express past time.
- Bavarian features verbal inflection for several moods such as indicative, subjunctive, imperative and optative. See the table below for inflection of the Bavarian verb måcha, 'make; do':

måcha	Indicative	Imperative	Subjunctive	Optative
1. Sg	i måch	—	i måchad	måchadi
2. Sg (informal)	du måchst	måch!	du måchast	måchast
3. Sg	er måcht	er måch!	er måchad	måchada
1. Pl	mia måchan*	måchma!	mia måchadn	måchadma
2. Pl	eß måchts	måchts!	eß måchats	måchats
3. Pl	se måchan(t)	—	se måchadn	måchadns
2. Sg (formal)	Si måchan	måchan’S!	Si måchadn	måchadn’S

=== Pronouns ===
==== Personal pronouns ====
	Singular				Plural		
	1st person	2nd person informal	2nd person formal	3rd person	1st person	2nd person	3rd person
Nominative	i	du	Si	ea, se/de, des	mia	eß/öß / ia*	se
Unstressed	i	--	-'S	-a, -'s, -'s	-ma	-'s	-'s
Dative	mia	dia	Eana	eam, eara/iara, dem	uns, ins	enk / eich*	ea, eana
Unstressed	-ma	-da					
Accusative	-mi	-di	Eana	eam, eara/iara, des	uns, ins	enk / eich*	ea, eana
Unstressed			Si	-'n, ..., -'s			-'s

* These are typically used in the northernmost dialects of Bavarian.

==== Possessive pronouns ====
	Masculine singular		Feminine singular		Neuter singular		Plural (any gender)
Nominative	mei	meina	mei	meine	mei	mei(n)s	meine
Accusative	mein		mei	meine	mei	mei(n)s	meine
Dative	meim		meina		meim		meine

The possessive pronouns Deina and Seina inflect in the same manner. Oftentimes, -nige is added to the nominative to form the adjective form of the possessive pronoun, like mei(nige), dei(nige), and the like.

==== Indefinite pronouns ====
Just like the possessive pronouns listed above, the indefinite pronouns koana, "none", and oana, "one" are inflected the same way.

There is also the indefinite pronoun ebba(d), "someone" with its impersonal form ebb(a)s, "something". It is inflected in the following way:

	Personal	Impersonal
Nominative	ebba	ebbs
Accusative	ebban	ebbs
Dative	ebbam	

==== Interrogative pronouns ====
The interrogative pronouns wea, "who", and wås, "what" are inflected the same way the indefinite pronoun ebba is inflected.

	Personal	Impersonal
Nominative	wea	wås
Accusative	wen	wås
Dative	wem	

== Society ==
Bavarians produce a variety of nicknames for those who bear traditional Bavarian or German names like Josef, Theresa or Georg (becoming Sepp'l or more commonly Sepp, Resi and Schorsch, respectively). Bavarians often refer to names with the family name coming first (like da Stoiber Ede instead of Edmund Stoiber). The use of the article is considered mandatory when using this linguistic variation. In addition, nicknames different from the family name exist for almost all families, especially in small villages. They consist largely of their profession, names or professions of deceased inhabitants of their homes or the site where their homes are located. This kind of nickname is called Hausname (English: housename), and often alludes not to the person themself, but to where they live or whom they are related to. Some examples of housenames are:

- Mohler or Maler ("painter");
- Bachbauer (literally "Brookfarmer", a farmer who lives by a brook or creek);
- Moosrees or Moosresi (literally "Bog Tess", i.e. "Theresa from the bog", from Moos, a dialectal term for a bog or marsh, and Rees/Resi, German pet-forms of Theresa);
- Schreiner ("joiner" or "carpenter").

== Samples of Bavarian dialects ==
This table compares two Bavarian dialects with Yiddish and Standard German. The dialects can be seen to share a number of features with Yiddish.

	s Bóarische is a Grubbm fő Dialektt im Siin fåm dætschn Shbroochråm.
	s Bóarische is a Grubbm fő Dialektt im Siin fóm daitschn Schproochraum.
Yiddish	בײַעריש איז אַ גרופּע דיאַלעקטן אויפֿן דרום פֿונעם דײַטשישן שפּראַך־קאָנטינוּוּם. Bayerish iz a grupe dialektn afn dorem funem daytshishn shprakh-kontinuum.
German	Das Bairische ist eine Gruppe von Dialekten im Süden des deutschen Sprachraumes.
English	Bavarian is a group of dialects in the south of the German Sprachraum.

	Sérawas*/Zéas/D'Ere/Griass Di/Griass Gód, i bĩ da Beeder und kumm/kimm fõ Minchn/Minicha.
	Sérwus/Habedéare/Griass Di/Griass Gód, i bin/bĩ da Beeder und kimm/kumm fo Minga/Minka.
Yiddish	שלום־עליכם, איך הייס פּעטער און איך קום פֿון מינכן. Sholem-aleykhem, ikh heys Peter un ikh kum fun Minkhn.
Standard German	Hallo/Servus/Grüß dich, ich bin Peter und komme aus München.
English	Hello, I am Peter and I come from Munich.

	D'Lisa/'s-Liasl hod sé an Haxn bróchn/brócha.
Bavarian	D'Lisa/As /Lisl hod sé an Hax brócha.
Yiddish	ליזע/ליזל האָט זיך צעבראָכן דעם פֿוס. Lize/Lizl hot zikh (hotsekh) tsebrokhn dem fus.
Standard German	Lisa hat sich das Bein gebrochen.
English	Lisa broke/has broken her leg.

	I ho(b)/hã/hoo a Göd/Goid gfundn/gfunna.
	I ho(b) a Gejd/Goid/Göld gfuna.
Yiddish	איך האָב (כ׳האָב) געפֿונען געלט. ikh hob (kh'hob) gefunen gelt.
Standard German	Ich habe Geld gefunden.
English	I (have) found money.

== See also ==
- Austrian German
- Viennese German
