= Nemški Rovt =

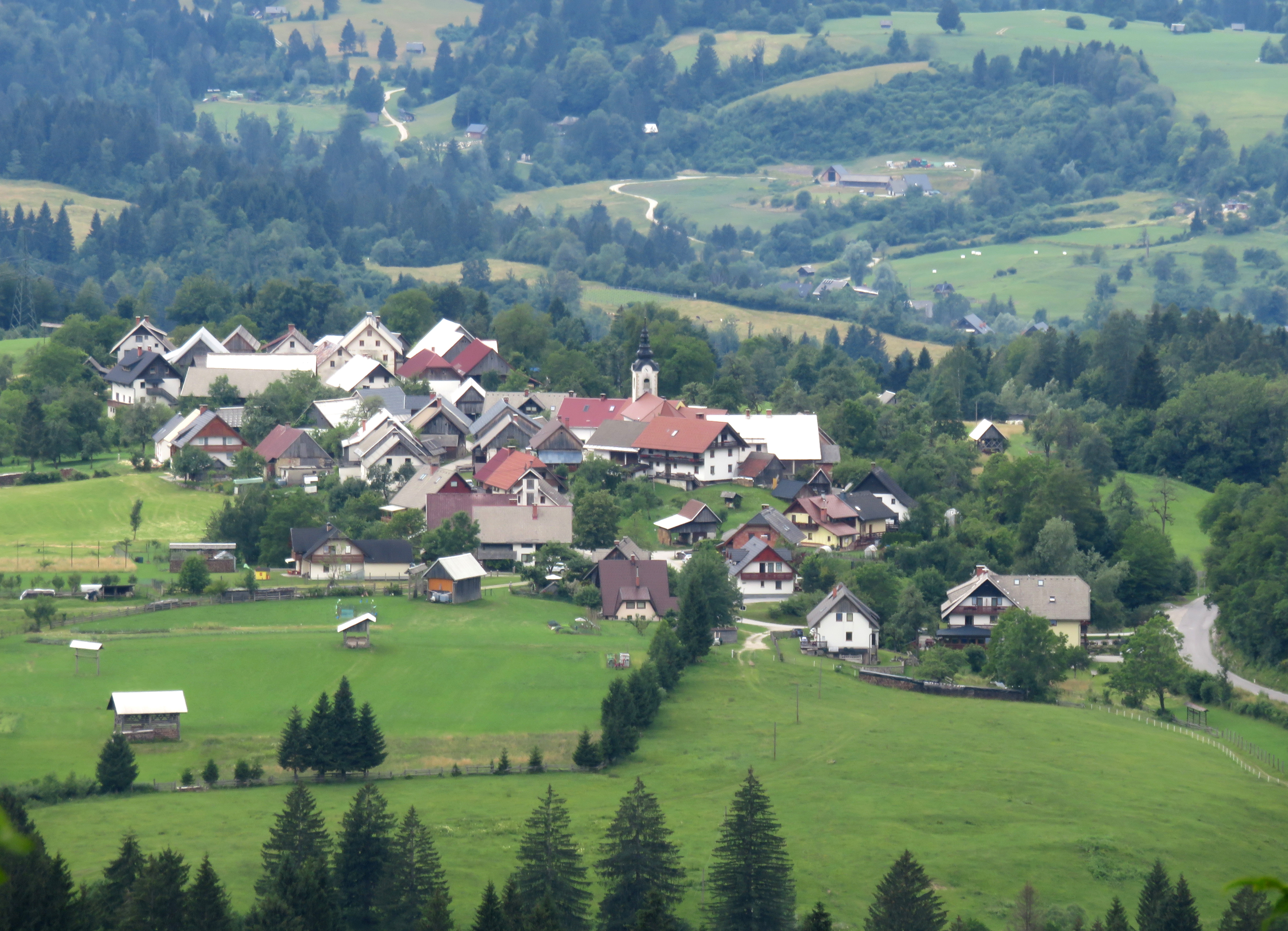

- Location in Slovenia
- Coordinates: 46°16′16.75″N 13°58′45.05″E
- Country: Slovenia
- Traditional region: Upper Carniola
- Statistical region: Upper Carniola
- Municipality: Bohinj
- Elevation: 669.2 m (2,196 ft)

Population (2020)
  - Total: 116

Nemški Rovt (pronounced [ˈneːmʃki ˈɾoːu̯t]; German: Deutschgereuth) is a settlement in the Municipality of Bohinj in the Upper Carniola region of Slovenia.

== History ==
In the first half of the 13th century, Germans from the Puster Valley founded the settlement of Deutschruth. Together with neighboring Zarz (Spodnja Sorica and Zgornja Sorica), it was part of a German language island for several centuries.

== Church ==
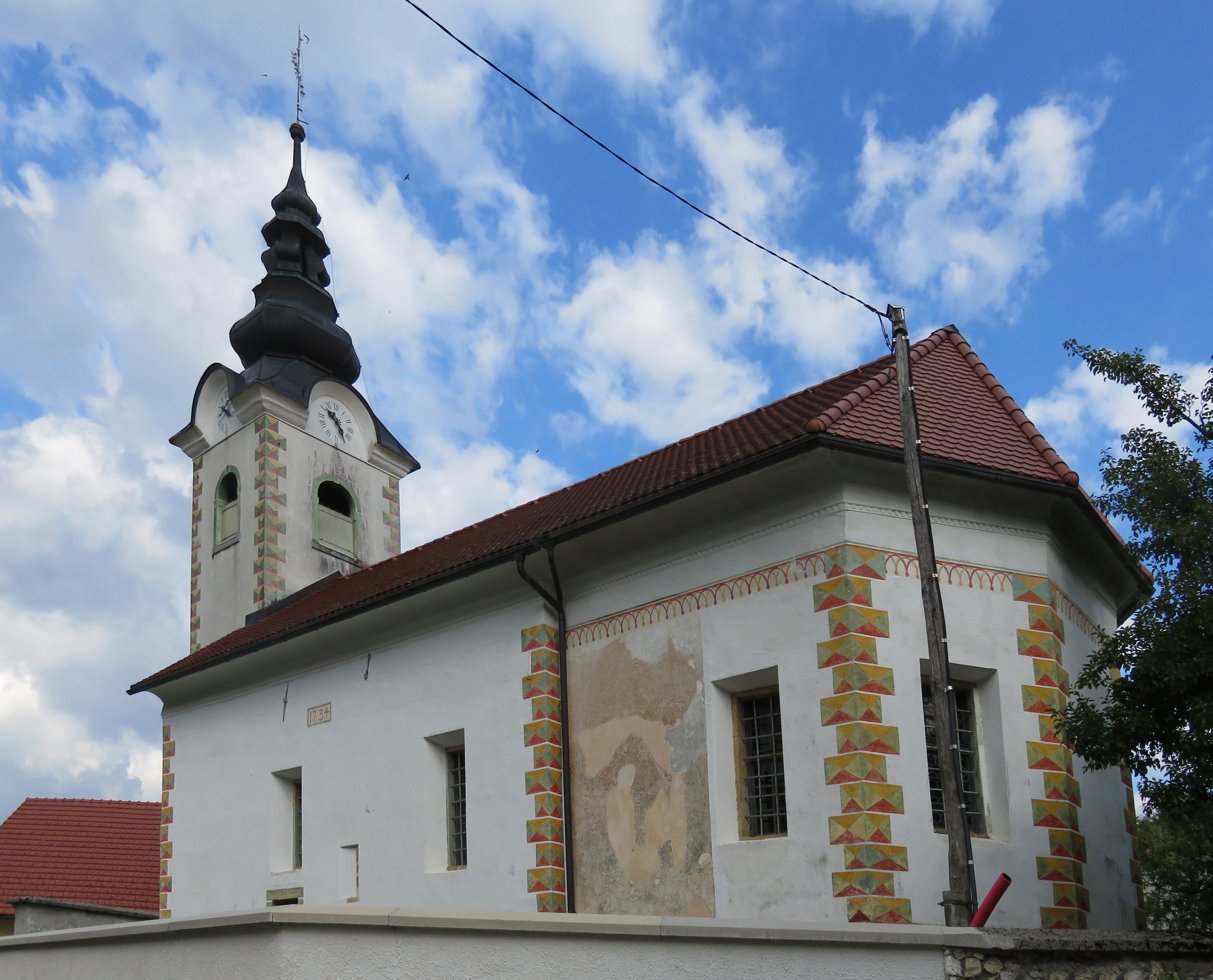
Saint Acacius's Church

The church in Nemški Rovt is dedicated to Saint Acacius. It belongs to the Parish of Bohinjska Bistrica.
