= Spodnja Sorica =

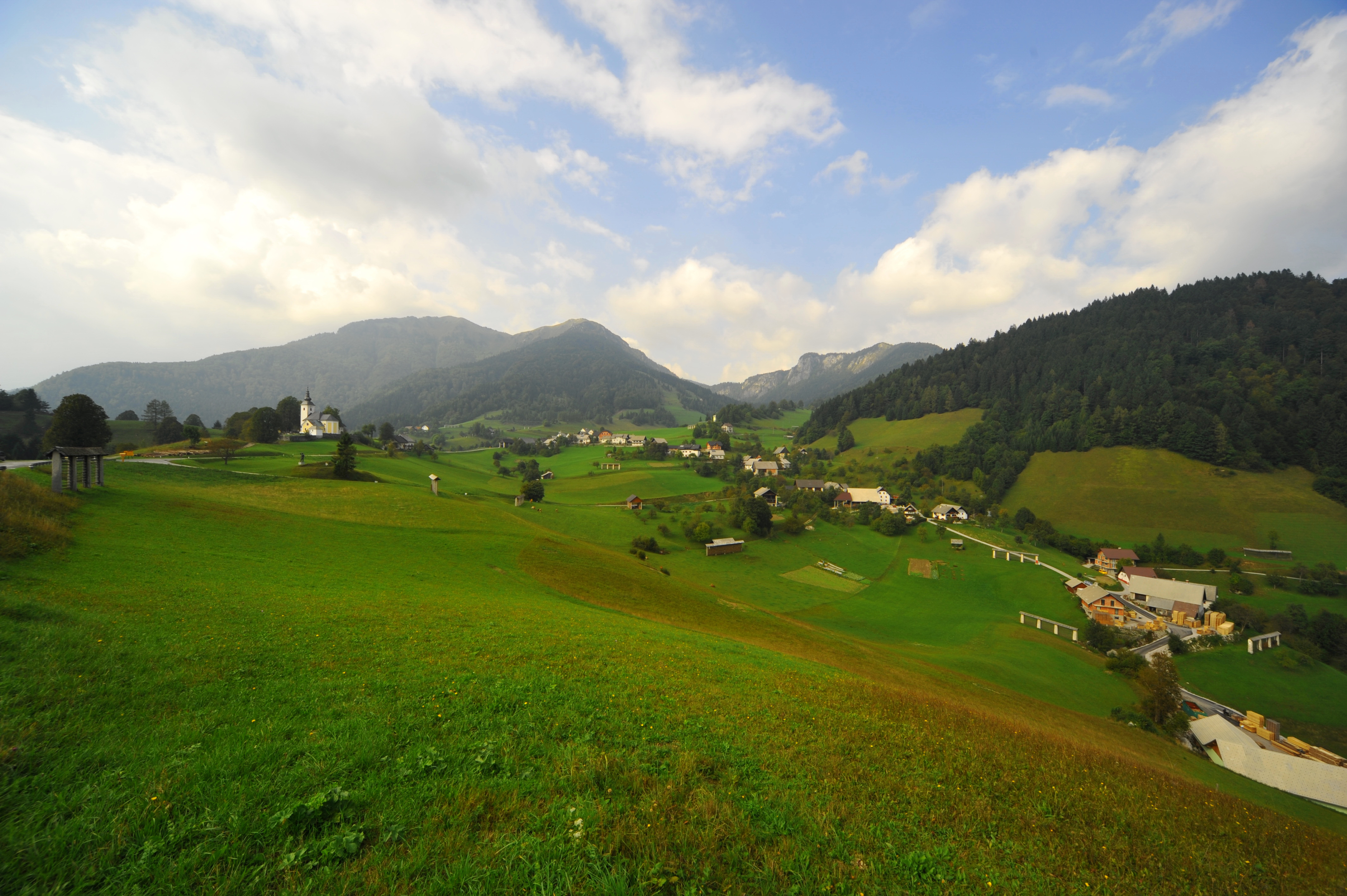

- Location in Slovenia
- Coordinates: 46°13′4.74″N 14°1′58.99″E
- Country: Slovenia
- Traditional Region: Upper Carniola
- Statistical region: Upper Carniola
- Municipality: Železniki

Area
  - Total: 4.415 km^{2} (1.705 sq mi)
- Elevation: 783.5 m (2,571 ft)

Population (2026)
  - Total: 110
  - Density: 25/km^{2} (65/sq mi)

Spodnja Sorica (pronounced [ˈspoːdnja ˈsoːɾitsa]; German: Unterzarz) is a village in the Municipality of Železniki in the Upper Carniola region of Slovenia. In January 2026, the population was 110.

It is the birthplace of the Slovene Impressionist painter Ivan Grohar. The house in which he was born stands in the middle of the village and holds a small collection of items associated with Grohar and an ethnographic collection as well as a gallery.

== Church ==
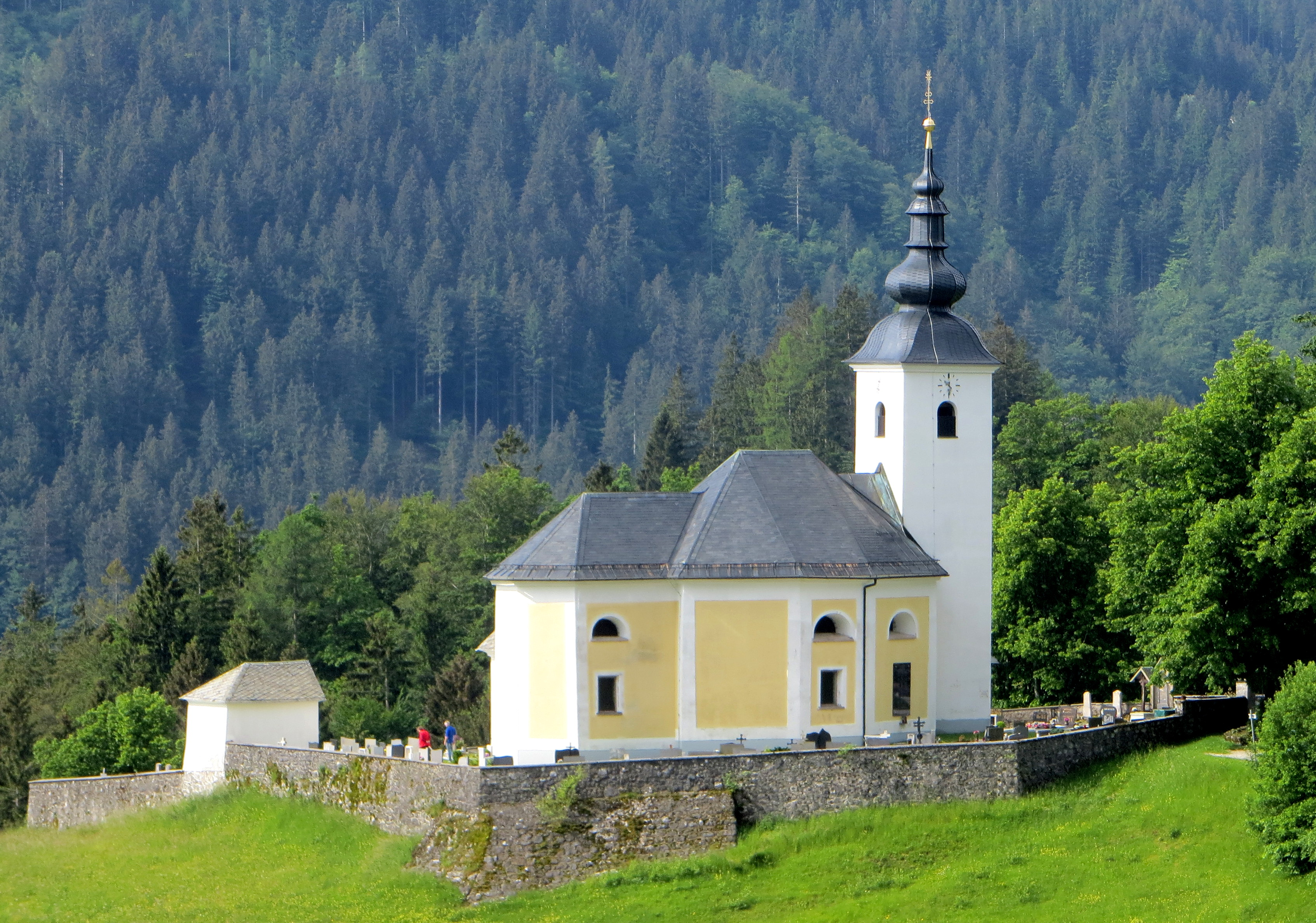
Saint Nicholas's Church

The local church is dedicated to Saint Nicholas. It also contains some of Grohar's early paintings, and there is a statue of Grohar nearby.
