= Langbein =

Langbein is a surname of German origin, meaning "long leg", and may refer to:

- Annabel Langbein (born 1958), New Zealand celebrity cook, food writer and publisher
- August Friedrich Ernst Langbein (1757–1835), German humoristic writer
- Brenton Langbein (1928–1993), Australian violinist, conductor, and composer
- Dieter Langbein (1932–2004), German physicist
- Fritz Langbein (1891–1967), New Zealand civil engineer
- George F. Langbein (1842–1911), New York politician
- Hermann Langbein (1912-1995), Austrian resistance fighter (Spanish Civil War and Nazi Germany), Righteous Among the Nations
- J. C. Julius Langbein (1846–1910), New York politician and judge
- John H. Langbein (born 1941), Sterling Professor of Law and Legal History at Yale Law School
- Laura Langbein, American political scientist
- Otto Langbein (1910-1988), Austrian resistance fighter against Nazi Germany, chief editor of the Österreichisches Wörterbuch
- Martha Langbein (born 1941), German athlete
