= Otto Langbein =

Austrian resistance fighter and activist

Otto Langbein (7 October 1910 – 1988) was an Austrian writer, resistance fighter against the Nazi regime, member of the Austrian Communist Party (until the violent suppression of the Hungarian uprising in 1956) and language reformer for Standard Austrian German. As chief editor of the Österreichisches Wörterbuch, Langbein played a key role in the codification of Austria's post-World-War-II standard variety.

== Early life ==
Langbein was born on 7 October 1910 in Vienna, Austria-Hungary. Otto Langbein's father Arthur, who came from a Jewish family, followed Greater German ideas, his favourite author was Heinrich Friedjung, notably for his German-nationalistic views and support for the Greater German solution to the German Question. He admired Otto von Bismarck, therefore Arthur Langbein named his first son after the Chancellor of Germany. Otto's mother came from a Catholic-conservative family.

Otto Langbein joined the Communist Party in 1932,a year before his younger brother Hermann Langbein, who is later internationally known for his role as a witness in the Auschwitz trial. Both Otto and Hermann became communists in light of the rise of National Socialism; they considered the Communist Party to be "the force that most decisively fought against the nationalist threat", according to Hermann Langbein, who always freely admitted that he emulated his older brother..

Otto was a student representative in Geography for "Roter Studentenbund", the communist student party, before he received a doctorate from the University of Vienna in 1935 with a dissertation on "The national-autonomous units in the geographical structure of the Soviet Union: a geographical-political view" (in German).

== Anschluss & World War II ==
As a communist student leader Langbein was politically opposed to and active against the Austro-fascist government of Engelbert Dollfuß/Kurt Schuschnigg, which had banned not only the Nazi Party NSDAP, but also the Socialist Party and the Communist Party.

In the autumn of 1936, communist propaganda material and a handgun with ammunition were confiscated from the apartment of a girlfriend of Otto and Hermann. The following year, Hermann was sentenced to three months in prison, and Otto received a similar sentence.

Fearing persecution by the Nazis following Anschluss in March 1938, Otto Langbein fled to France and worked on a farm in the French Massif Central as a shepherd. As he had suffered from tuberculosis, he was unable to join his brother Hermann to fight in the Spanish Civil War for the International Brigades against dictator Francisco Franco.

Otto later secretly returned to Vienna and hid in the flat of his aunt Else, who had become a kind of foster mother to Otto and Hermann after the early death of their mother Margarete. Every time the Gestapo inspected the building, he climbed into the attic and remained undetected. In 1944, when his brother Hermann managed to have a report smuggled from within Auschwitz extermination camp to Vienna that included detailed figures on the death toll in the camp, Otto Langbein made about two thousand copies of the report and deposited them in public places at great personal risk.

On 14 July 1942 Otto Langbein's doctorate was revoked by the Nazi-Senate of the University of Vienna, with the racist reasoning that Jews were considered "unworthy of academic degrees from German universities". On 15 May 1955, a full decade after liberation from Nazi rule, the rescinding of Langbein's academic degree was declared "null and void".

== Postwar Austria ==
Langbein was Secretary General [Zentralsekretär] of the Austrian-Soviet Society and held several other functions within the communist party, including chief editor of the magazine Telegramm. In January 1957, in protest of the armed Soviet response to the 1956 Hungarian uprising, Langbein left the Austrian Communist Party. He subsequently directed the "Wörterbuchstelle" of the Österreichisches Wörterbuch (ÖWB) at Österreichischen Bundesverlag until 1975 (succeeding the retiring founding editor Albert Krassnigg).

Langbein was one of Austria's most outspoken proponents for linguistic autonomy from Germany. Given his experience in World War II, Langbein focused on the Austrian component in standard German as a means to help create an independent Austrian identity. In his regular column "Die Sprache des Österreichers", published in the quarterly journal Die Österreichische Nation, Langbein discussed under the pseudonym Dr. Norbert Gstrein from 1959 to 1975 features of Standard Austrian German. Langbein's column was criticized into the 1970s by former Nazi supporters and Austro-fascists alike, yet found praise by proponents of a pluricentric German. In the 1990s Langbein was recognized as an early codifier of the Austrian standard.

Langbein was, as chief editor of ÖWB, a member of the Austrian (state) committee for orthographic reform, along Anton Pelinka and Eberhard Kranzmayer.

In the 1960s and 1970s, Langbein became an important critic of the continuation of Nazi-approaches in German dialectology and linguistics. In the journal Die österreichische Nation (The Austrian Nation) Langbein published open letters to Eberhard Kranzmayer, then director of the Dictionary of Austrian Bavarian Dialects (one of the longest-funded research projects in Austria, since 1911/13 and ongoing), and Kranzmayer's responses or lack of responses in order to reveal Kranzmayer's pan-German (thus anti-Austrian) mindset. In their 2025 book Austrian German: a 300-Year Love Story, UBC professor Stefan Dollinger and associates cast Otto Langbein's public critique against Kranzmayer's Austrian Academy dictionary of Bavarian dialects (one of the longest funded projects in Austria) as the central conflict around Standard Austrian German, a David-vs-Goliath conflict. While the former "Nazi philologists" around Kranzmayer had no interest in multiple standards of German, Langbein and associates considered the expression of an Austrian identity in the German language as essential for the post-war, anti-fascist development of the Austrian Republic.

Otto Langbein was under his alias Franz Schneider a founding member of Vienna's HOSI initiative in 1980, the country's first lobbying society for the rights of homosexual (gay and lesbian) people.

== Selected works ==
Österreichisches Wörterbuch, editions 1960-1976. ÖBV.

Österreich-Lexikon in zwei Bänden, ed. by Richard Bamberger, Franz Maier-Bruck, Otto Langbein. 1966, 1967, Additions & Corrections volume 1968. ÖBV.
