= Standard German =

Standardized variety of German language

- Standard High German, High German, also often simply German
- Standarddeutsch, Standardhochdeutsch, Hochdeutsch
- Region: German-speaking Europe
- Speakers: L1: 76 million (2019); L2: 59 million Total: 130 million
- Language family: Indo-European: Germanic; West Germanic; Elbe Germanic; High German; Standard German
- Early forms: Proto-Germanic: West Germanic; Old High German; Middle High German; Early New High German
- Standard forms: Standard German (German, Austrian, Swiss)
- Writing system: Latin script (German alphabet); German Braille
- Signed forms: Signed German

Official status
- Regulated by: Council for German Orthography

Language codes
- ISO 639-1: de
- ISO 639-2: ger (B) deu (T)
- ISO 639-3: deu
- Glottolog: stan1295
- Linguasphere: 52-ACB–dl

Standard German, also Standard High German or High German (Note: Not to be confused with High German languages.) (German: Standarddeutsch, Standardhochdeutsch, Hochdeutsch or, in Switzerland, Schriftdeutsch), is the umbrella term for the standardized varieties of the German language, which are used in formal contexts and for communication between different dialect areas. German is a pluricentric Dachsprache with currently three codified (or standardised) specific national varieties: German Standard German, Austrian Standard German and Swiss Standard German.

Regarding the spelling and punctuation, a recommended standard is published by the Council for German Orthography which represents the governments of all majority and minority German-speaking countries and dependencies. Adherence is obligatory for government institutions, including schools. Although there is no official standards body regulating pronunciation, there is a long-standing de facto standard pronunciation (Bühnendeutsch), most commonly used in formal speech and teaching materials; it is similar to the formal German spoken in and around Hanover. Adherence to those standards by private individuals and companies, including the print and audio-visual media, is voluntary. Austrian German has had standard pronunciation exceptions since 1904 (Luick's österreichische Bühnenaussprache). In Switzerland, no such official pronunciation codex exists, yet most Swiss Standard German speakers are markedly different sounding from Hanover-type phonetic targets.

== Origins ==
Standard German originated not as a traditional dialect of a specific region but as a written language developed over a process of several hundred years in which writers tried to write in a way that was understood in the largest area.

Martin Luther's translation of the Bible in 1522 (New Testament, Old Testament 1534) was an important development towards an early standardization of written German. Luther based his translation largely on the already developed language of the Saxon chancery, which was more widely understood than other dialects and as a Central German dialect, was felt to be "halfway" between the dialects of the north and south. Luther drew principally on East Central German dialects in his codification efforts.

Later in 1748, a grammar manual by Johann Christoph Gottsched, Grundlegung einer deutschen Sprachkunst, was key in the development of German writing and standardization of the language. Similarly to Luther, Gottsched based his manual on the Central German variant of the Upper Saxon area. Over the course of the mid-18th century and onward, a written standard then began to emerge and be widely accepted in German-speaking areas, thus ending the period of Early New High German.

Until about 1800, Standard German was almost entirely a written variety. People in Northern Germany who spoke mainly Low Saxon dialects, which were very different from Standard German, learned it more or less as a foreign language. However, the Northern pronunciation (of Standard German) later became considered standard and spread southward. In some regions such as around Hanover, the local dialect has completely died out as spoken language but is preserved in dialect literature and scholarly descriptions.

It can thus be argued that it is the spread of Standard German as a language taught at school that defines the German Sprachraum, which was thus a political decision, rather than a direct consequence of dialect geography. That allowed areas with dialects with very little mutual intelligibility to participate in the same cultural sphere. Some linguists claim today that a One Standard German Axiom is a discipline-defining feature of Germanistik. Outside of Switzerland, Austria and South Tyrol, local dialects tend to be used mainly in informal situations or at home and in dialect literature.

== Terminology ==
In German, Standard German is generally called Hochdeutsch, reflecting the fact that its phonetics are largely those of the High German spoken in the southern uplands and the Alps (including Austria, Switzerland, Liechtenstein and parts of northern Italy as well as southern Germany). The corresponding term Low German reflects the fact that these dialects belong to the lowlands stretching towards the North Sea. The widespread but mistaken impression that Hochdeutsch is so-called because it is perceived to be "good German" has led to use of the supposedly less judgmental Standarddeutsch ("Standard German"), deutsche Standardsprache ("German standard language"). On the other hand, the "standard" written languages of Switzerland and Austria have each been codified as standards distinct from that used in Germany. For this reason, "Hochdeutsch" or "High German", originally a mere geographic designation, applies unproblematically to Swiss Standard German and Austrian Standard German as well as to German Standard German and may be preferred for that reason.

== Pluricentricity ==
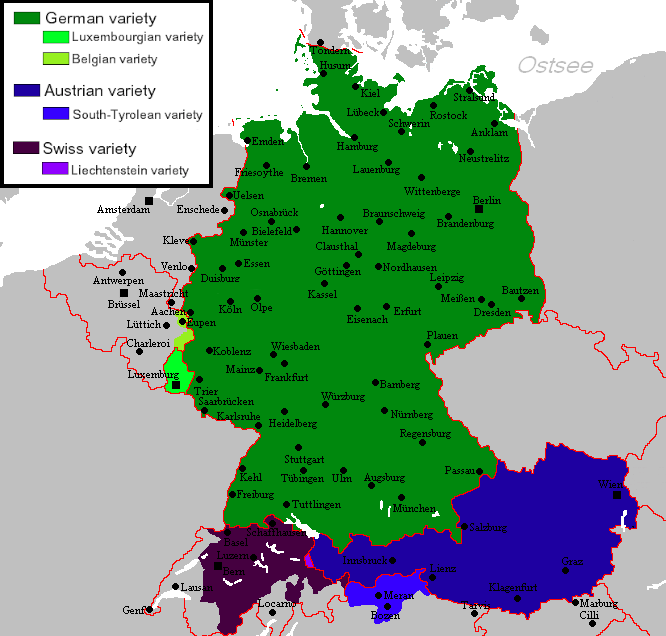
The national and regional standard varieties of the German language

Since the 1980s, German has widely been considered a pluricentric language with the national standard varieties of German Standard German, Austrian Standard German and Swiss Standard German. These varieties of standard German differ above all in vocabulary, pragmatics and pronunciation, but in some instances also in grammar and, in only a handful of cases, in orthography. In formal writing, the differences are small; in regards to the spoken language, the different varieties of Standard German are easily recognized by most speakers, as the audio and video samples illustrate.

An Austrian Standard German speaker (Heinz Kröpfl for Radio Grün-Weiß, 2010)

A Swiss Standard German speaker (2008)

A Standard German speaker from Germany

These three national standards (German, Austrian and Swiss) have each been adopted by other German-speaking countries and communities as their standard form of German. The German standard is applied in Luxembourg, Belgium, and Namibia while the Swiss standard has been adopted in Liechtenstein.

The variation of the Standard German varieties must not be confused with the variation of the local German dialects. Even though the Standard German varieties are to a certain degree influenced by the local dialects, they are very distinct. All varieties of Standard German are based on the common tradition of the written German language, whereas the local dialects have their own historical roots that go further back than the unification of the written language, and in the case of Low German, belong to a different language entirely.

== Continuum between Standard German and German dialects ==
In most regions, the speakers use a continuum of mixtures from more dialectal varieties to more standard varieties according to situation. However, there are two (or three) exceptions:

- In Northern Germany, there is no continuum in the strict sense between the local varieties of Low German ("Plattdeutsch") on one hand and Standard German on the other. Since the former have not undergone the High German consonant shift, they are too different from the standard for a continuum to emerge. High German and Low German are best seen as separate languages, but because High (Middle and Upper) and Low German form a dialect continuum and Standard German serves as Dachsprache for all forms of German, they are often described as dialects of German. Under a sociolinguistic approach to the problem, even if Low German dialects are Abstandsprachen (linguistically quite different), they are perceived as dialects of German because they lack Ausbau. However, Low German influenced the standard-based vernaculars that are spoken today in Northern Germany by language transfer in pronunciation, vocabulary, grammar, and syntax, and it continues to do so to a limited degree. High German that is heavily influenced by Low German has been known as Missingsch, but most contemporary Northern Germans exhibit only an intermediate Low German substratum in their speech.
- In German-speaking Switzerland, there is no such continuum between the Swiss German varieties and Swiss Standard German, and the use of Standard German is almost entirely restricted to the written language. Therefore, the situation has been called a medial diglossia. Standard German is seldom spoken among native Swiss, (Note: Though about 10%, or 830,000 Swiss residents speak High German a.k.a. Standard German at home.) and even then the accent and vocabulary is very much Swiss except, for instance, when speaking with people who do not understand the Swiss German dialects at all, and it is expected to be used in school. Standard German has, however, left a clear imprint on the contemporary variants of Swiss German, regional expressions and vocabulary having been replaced with material assimilated from the standard language. Of all German-speaking countries, Switzerland has, however, the most fully retained the use of dialect in everyday situations. Dialect is used to a lesser extent for some everyday situations in southern Germany, Austria, Liechtenstein, Alsace, and South Tyrol. The regular use of dialect in the Swiss media (radio, internet, and television) contrasts with its much rarer appearance in the media of Austria, Germany, East Belgium, South Tyrol, and Liechtenstein.
- Luxembourgish was considered a German dialect like many others until about World War II but then underwent ausbau. It created its own standard form in vocabulary, grammar and spelling and therefore is seen today as an independent language. Since Luxembourgish has a maximum of some 600,000 native speakers, resources in the language (books, newspapers, magazines, television, internet, etc.) are limited. Since most Luxembourgers also speak Standard German and French, there is strong competition with both, which have very large language resources. Luxembourgers are generally trilingual and use French and Standard German in some areas of life, Luxembourgish in others. Standard German is taught in the schools in Luxembourg, and close to 90% of the population can speak it.

== Phonology ==
While the three principal national varieties are recognized as three distinct standards, the differences are few, perhaps comparable to the difference between British and American English. The pronouncing dictionary of the Duden dictionary group codifies the standard pronunciation for German Standard German and allows for a small number of divergences; for example, the string "äh" has two authorized pronunciations, /ɛː/ and /eː/. Some regions see only the first as correct, and others use only the second; Duden now recognizes both as correct. Standardized High German pronunciation is generally used in radio and television as well as in German learning materials for non-natives and at least aspirationally by language teachers. The accent is documented in reference works such as Deutsches Aussprachewörterbuch (German Pronunciation Dictionary) by Eva-Maria Krech et al., (Note: On pages 1–2, Deutsches Aussprachewörterbuch discusses die Standardaussprache, die Gegenstand dieses Wörterbuches ist ("the standard pronunciation which is the topic of this dictionary"). It also mentions Da sich das Deutsche zu einer plurizentrischen Sprache entwickelt hat, bildeten sich jeweils eigene Standardvarietäten (und damit Standardaussprachen) ("German has developed into a pluricentric language separate standard varieties (and hence standard pronunciations)") but refers to the standards as regionale und soziolektale Varianten ("regional and sociolectal variants").) Duden 6 Das Aussprachewörterbuch (Duden volume 6, The Pronunciation Dictionary) by Max Mangold and the training materials at the Westdeutscher Rundfunk (West German Broadcasting) and Deutschlandfunk (Radio Germany). It is an invented accent, rather than one radiating from any particular German-speaking city. It is often said that the people of Hannover speak German with an accent that comes closest to the standard of the Duden dictionaries, but the claim is debatable, particularly since it may apply equally well to the rest of Northern Germany.

== Orthography ==
=== Features ===
Standard High German is written in the Latin alphabet. In addition to the 26 standard letters, German has three vowels with an umlaut mark, namely ä, ö and ü, as well as the Eszett or scharfes s (sharp s): ß. In Switzerland and Liechtenstein, ss is used instead of ß.

=== History ===
A first step to standardisation, although non-prescriptive, of Early New High German was introduced by the Luther Bible of 1534. In consequence, the written language of the chancery of Saxony-Wittenberg rose in importance in the course of the 17th century so much so that it was used in texts such as the 1665 revision of the Zürich Bible.

The First Orthographical Conference convened in 1876 by order of the government of Prussia, but failed. Konrad Duden published the first edition of his dictionary, later simply known as the Duden, in 1880. The first spelling codification by the Second Orthographic Conference of 1901, based on Duden's work, came into effect in 1902.

In 1944, there was a failed attempt at another reform; this was delayed on the order of Hitler and not taken up again after the end of World War II.

In the following decades, German spelling was essentially decided de facto by the editors of the Duden dictionaries. After the war, this tradition was followed with two different centers: Mannheim in West Germany and Leipzig in East Germany. By the early 1950s, a few other publishing houses had begun to attack the Duden monopoly in the West by publishing their own dictionaries, which did not always conform to the "official" spellings prescribed by Duden. In response, the Ministers of Culture of the federal states in West Germany officially declared the Duden spellings to be binding as of November 1955 ("Duden-Monopol" or "Dudenmonopol", "Duden-Privileg" or "Dudenprivileg").

==== Orthography Reform of 1996 ====
The orthography reform of 1996 was based on an international agreement signed by the governments of the German-speaking countries Germany, Austria, Liechtenstein and Switzerland; but acceptance of the reform was limited and led to public controversy and considerable dispute. The states (Bundesländer) of North Rhine-Westphalia and Bavaria refused to accept it. At one point, the dispute reached the highest court, which quickly dismissed it, claiming that the states had to decide for themselves and that only in schools could the reform be made the official rule – everybody else could continue writing as they had learned it.

While, as of 2004, most German print media followed the reform, some newspapers, such as Die Zeit, Neue Zürcher Zeitung and Süddeutsche Zeitung, created their own in-house orthographies.

After 10 years, without any intervention by the federal parliament, a major revision of the spelling reform was installed in 2006 because there were disagreements regarding capitalization and splitting of German words. Also revised were the rules governing punctuation marks.

The most noticeable change was probably in the use of the letter ß, called scharfes s (Sharp S) or Eszett (pronounced ess-tsett, coming from ſz). Traditionally, this letter was used in three situations:

1. After a long vowel or vowel combination;
2. Before a t;
3. At the end of a syllable.

Examples are Füße, paßt, and daß. Currently, only the first rule is in effect, making the reformed spellings Füße, passt, and dass. The word Fuß 'foot' has the letter ß because it contains a long vowel, even though that letter occurs at the end of a syllable. The logic of this change is that an 'ß' is a single letter whereas 'ss' are two letters, so the same distinction applies as (for example) between the words den and denn.

== English to Standard German cognates ==
This is a selection of cognates in both English and Standard German. Instead of the usual infinitive ending -en, Standard German verbs are indicated by a hyphen after their stems. Words that are written with capital letters in Standard German are nouns.

English	German	English	German	English	German	English	German	English	German	English	German	English	German	English	German
and	und	arm	Arm	bear	Bär	beaver	Biber	bee	Biene	beer	Bier	best	best	better	besser
blink	blink-	bloom	blüh-	blue	blau	boat	Boot	book	Buch	brew	brau-	brewery	Brauerei	bridge	Brücke
brow	Braue	brown	braun	church	Kirche	cold	kalt	cool	kühl	dale	Tal	dam	Damm	dance	tanz-
dough	Teig	dream	Traum	dream	träum-	drink	Getränk	drink	trink-	ear	Ohr	earth	Erde	eat	ess-
far	fern	feather	Feder	fern	Farn	field	Feld	finger	Finger	fish	Fisch	fisher	Fischer	flee	flieh-
flight	Flug	flood	Flut	flow	fließ-	flow	Fluss (Fluß)	fly	Fliege	fly	flieg-	for	für	ford	Furt
four	vier	fox	Fuchs	glass	Glas	go	geh-	gold	Gold	good	gut	grass	Gras	grasshopper	Grashüpfer
green	grün	grey	grau	hag	Hexe	hail	Hagel	hand	Hand	hard	hart	hate	Hass	haven	Hafen
hay	Heu	hear	hör-	heart	Herz	heat	Hitze	heath	Heide	high	hoch	honey	Honig	hornet	Hornisse
hundred	hundert	hunger	Hunger	hut	Hütte	ice	Eis	king	König	kiss	Kuss (Kuß)	kiss	küss-	knee	Knie
land	Land	landing	Landung	laugh	lach-	lie, lay	lieg-, lag	lie, lied	lüg-, log	light (A)	leicht	light	Licht	live	leb-
liver	Leber	love	Liebe	man	Mann	middle	Mitte	midnight	Mitternacht	moon	Mond	moss	Moos	mouth	Mund
mouth (river)	Mündung	night	Nacht	nose	Nase	nut	Nuss (Nuß)	over	über	plant	Pflanze	quack	quak-	rain	Regen
rainbow	Regenbogen	red	rot	ring	Ring	sand	Sand	say	sag-	sea	See (f.)	seam	Saum	seat	Sitz
see	seh-	sheep	Schaf	shimmer	schimmer-	shine	schein-	ship	Schiff	silver	Silber	sing	sing-	sit	sitz-
snow	Schnee	soul	Seele	speak	sprech-	spring	spring-	star	Stern	stitch	Stich	stork	Storch	storm	Sturm
stormy	stürmisch	strand	strand-	straw	Stroh	straw bale	Strohballen	stream	Strom	stream	ström-	stutter	stotter-	summer	Sommer
sun	Sonne	sunny	sonnig	swan	Schwan	tell	erzähl-	that (C)	dass (daß)	the	der, die, das, des, dem, den	then	dann	thirst	Durst
thistle	Distel	thorn	Dorn	thousand	tausend	thunder	Donner	twitter	zwitscher-	upper	ober	warm	warm	wasp	Wespe
water	Wasser	weather	Wetter	weave	web-	well	Quelle	well	wohl	which	welch	white	weiß	wild	wild
wind	Wind	winter	Winter	wolf	Wolf	word	Wort	world	Welt	yarn	Garn	year	Jahr	yellow	gelb
English	German	English	German	English	German	English	German	English	German	English	German	English	German	English	German

== Loanwords from Standard German to English ==
English has taken many loanwords from German, often without any change of spelling (aside from frequently eliminating umlauts and not capitalizing nouns):

German word	English loanword	Definition of German word
abseilen (v.)	abseil	to descend by rope / to fastrope
Angst	angst	fear
Ansatz	ansatz	onset / entry / math / approach
Anschluß/Anschluss	Anschluss	connection / access / annexation
Automat	automat	automation / machine
Bildungsroman	bildungsroman	novel concerned with the personal development or education of the protagonist
Blitzkrieg	blitzkrieg, shortend blitz	lit. 'lightning war': military strategy
Bratwurst	bratwurst	fried sausage
Delikatessen	delicatessen	delicious food items
Dirndl	dirndl	lit. "young woman": type of feminine dress
Doppelgänger	doppelgänger	lit. "double going / living person alive", look-alike of somebody
Dramaturg	dramaturge	professional position within a theatre or opera company that deals mainly with research and development of plays or operas
Edelweiß or Edelweiss (Swiss spelling)	edelweiss	edelweiss flower
Ersatz	ersatz	lit. "replacement", typically used to refer to an inferior substitute for a desired substance or item
Fest	fest	feast / celebration
Flugabwehrkanone	flak	lit. "flight defence gun": anti-aircraft gun, abbreviated as FlaK
Frankfurter	frankfurt(er)	demonym of Frankfurt am Main
Gedankenexperiment	gedankenexperiment	thought experiment
Geländesprung	geländesprung	ski jumping for distance on alpine equipment
Gemütlichkeit	gemütlichkeit	snug feeling, cosiness, good nature, geniality
Gestalt	gestalt	form or shape / creature / scheme; a concept of 'wholeness' (etymologically die Gestalt comes from the past participle of Old High German stellen used as a noun)
Gesundheit!	Gesundheit! (Amer.)	health / bless you! (when someone sneezes)
Glockenspiel	glockenspiel	percussion instrument
Hamburger	hamburger & other burgers	demonym of Hamburg
Heiligenschein	heiligenschein	lit. "saints' light": halo (as a religious term)
Hinterland	hinterland	lit. "(military) area behind the front-line": interior / backwoods
kaputt	kaput	out of order, not working
Katzenjammer	katzenjammer	lit. "cats' lament": hangover, crapulence
Kindergarten	kindergarten	lit. "children's garden" – nursery or preschool
Kitsch	kitsch	fake art, something produced exclusively for sale
Kobold	kobold, cobalt	small supernatural being
Kraut or Sauerkraut	kraut, Kraut	herb, cabbage or pickled cabbage
Kulturkampf	kulturkampf	cultural war
Leitmotiv	leitmotif	guiding theme (the verb leiten means "to guide, to lead")
Nationalsozialismus or Nationalsozialist	nazi	national socialism or national socialist
Nixe	nixie	water spirit
Panzer	panzer	lit. "armour": tank
plündern (v.)	to plunder	lit. "taking goods by force" (original meaning "to take away furniture" shifted in German and both borrowed by English during the Thirty Years' War)
Poltergeist	poltergeist	lit. "rumbling ghost"
Realpolitik	realpolitik	diplomacy based on practical objectives rather than ideals
Reich	Reich	empire or realm
Rucksack	rucksack	backpack (Ruck → Rücken which means "back")
Sauerkraut	sauerkraut	shredded and salted cabbage fermented in its own juice
Schadenfreude	schadenfreude	taking pleasure in someone else's misfortune, gloating
Spiel	spiel	lit. "game / play": sales pitch / lengthy speech with the intent to persuade
Sprachbund	sprachbund	linguistic term, lit. "language alliance": area of linguistic convergence
Sprachraum	sprachraum	linguistic term, lit. "place/area/room of a language": area where a certain language is spoken
Strudel	strudel	lit. "whirlpool": kind of pastry
Unterseeboot	U-boat	lit. "under sea boat": submarine, abbreviated as U-Boot
über (prep.)	uber	over, above
Übermensch	übermensch	superhuman, "overhuman"
Vampir	vampire	dead person that feeds on the living
verklemmt (adj.)	verklemmt (Amer.)	lit. "jammed": inhibited, uptight
Waldsterben	waldsterben	lit. "forest dieback", dying floral environment
Wanderlust	wanderlust	desire, pleasure, or inclination to travel or walk
Wasserscheide	watershed	lit. "water division": drainage divide
Weltanschauung	weltanschauung	lit. "perception of the world": worldview
Wunderkind	wunderkind	lit. "wonder child": child prodigy, whiz kid
Zeitgeist	zeitgeist	lit. "spirit of the times": the spirit of the age; the trend at that time
Zeitnot	zeitnot	chess term, lit. 'time trouble'
Zugzwang	zugzwang	chess term, lit. "compulsion to move"
Zwischenzug	zwischenzug	chess term, lit. "intermediate move"

== Dictionaries ==
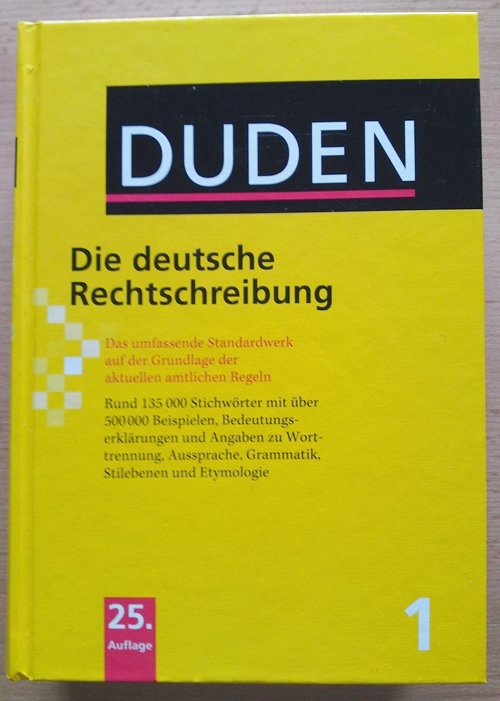
Volume 1 "German Orthography" of the 25th edition of the Duden dictionary

The Duden is the de facto official dictionary of the Standard High German language, first published by Konrad Duden in 1880. The Duden is updated regularly, with new editions appearing every four or five years. As of August 2017, it was in its 27th edition and in 12 volumes, each covering different aspects such as loanwords, etymology, pronunciation, synonyms, and so forth.
The first of these volumes, Die deutsche Rechtschreibung (German Orthography), has long been the prescriptive source for the spelling of Standard High German. The Duden had become the bible of the Standard High German language, being the definitive set of rules regarding grammar, spelling, and usage of Standard High German.

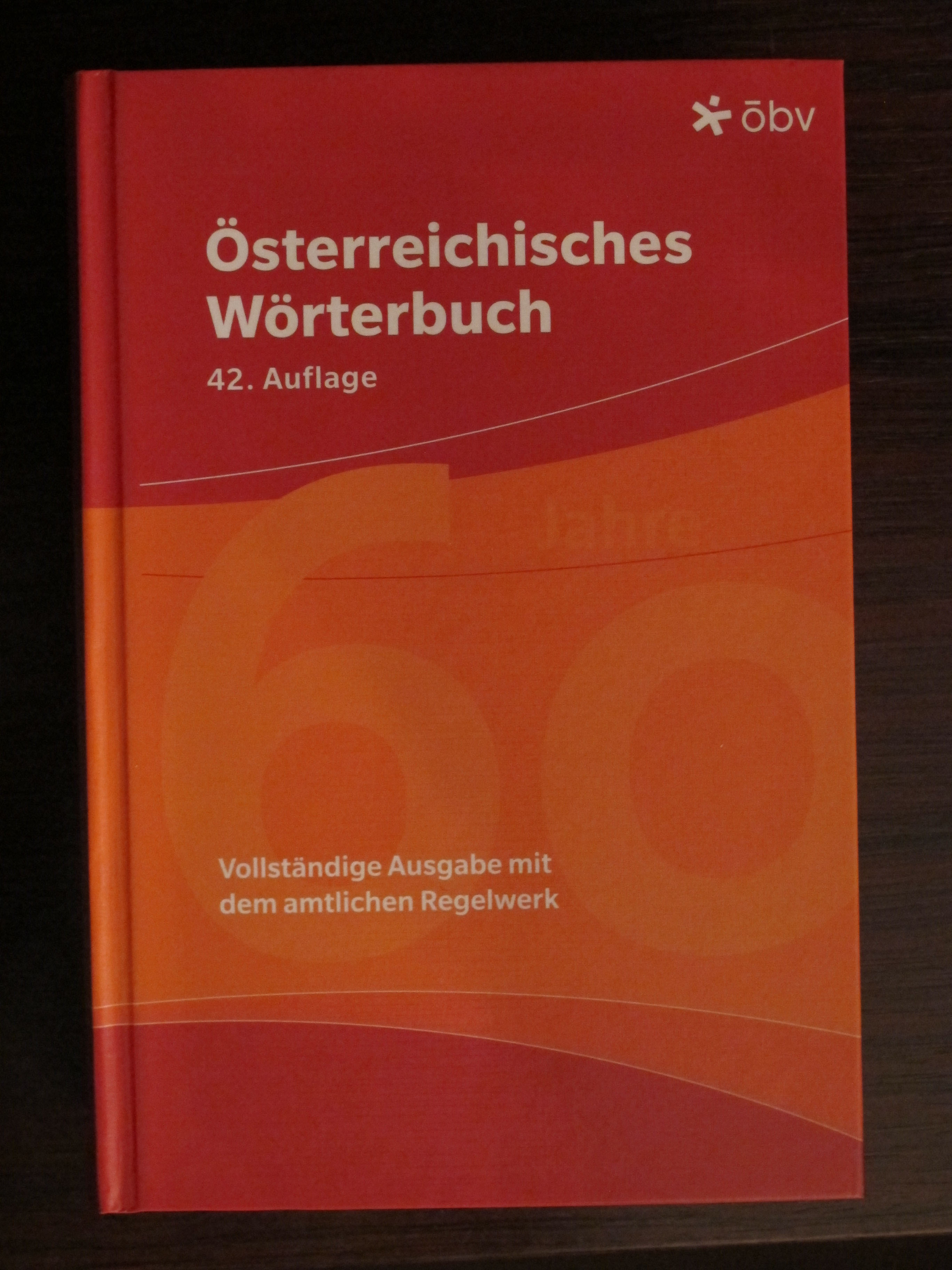
42nd edition of the Österreichisches Wörterbuch ("Austrian Dictionary")

The Österreichisches Wörterbuch ("Austrian Dictionary"), abbreviated ÖWB, is the official dictionary of the Standard High German language in the Republic of Austria. It is edited by a group of linguists under the authority of the Austrian Federal Ministry of Education, Arts and Culture (German: Bundesministerium für Unterricht, Kunst und Kultur). It is the Austrian counterpart to the German Duden and contains a number of terms unique to Austrian German or more frequently used or differently pronounced there. A considerable amount of this "Austrian" vocabulary is also common in Southern Germany, especially Bavaria, and some of it is used in Switzerland as well. Since the 39th edition in 2001 the orthography of the ÖWB has been adjusted to the German spelling reform of 1996. The dictionary is also officially used in the Italian province of South Tyrol. It is currently available in 44th edition, from 2022, and includes an online version with limited access.

== Organisations ==
Several organisations promote the use and learning of the Standard German language.

=== Goethe Institut ===
The government-backed Goethe-Institut (named after Johann Wolfgang von Goethe), aims to enhance the knowledge of German culture and language within Europe and the rest of the world. This is done by holding exhibitions and conferences with German-related themes, and providing training and guidance in the learning and use of the German language. For example, the Goethe-Institut teaches the Goethe-Zertifikat German language qualification.

=== Deutsche Welle ===
Deutsche Welle logo

The German state broadcaster Deutsche Welle provides radio and television broadcasts in Standard German and 30 other languages across the globe. Its Standard German language services are spoken slowly and thus tailored for learners. Deutsche Welle also provides an e-learning website for learning Standard German.

== See also ==
- History of the German language
- Standard language

== Bibliography ==
- König, Werner (1989). dtv-Atlas zur deutschen Sprache. München: Deutscher Taschenbuch Verlag. ISBN 3-423-03025-9.
- von Polenz, Peter (1999). Deutsche Sprachgeschichte vom Spätmittelalter bis zur Gegenwart. Vol. Band III. 19. und 20. Jahrhundert. Berlin, New York: Walter de Gruyter. ISBN 978-3-11-014344-7.
