= Martin Pollack =

Austrian journalist (1944–2025)

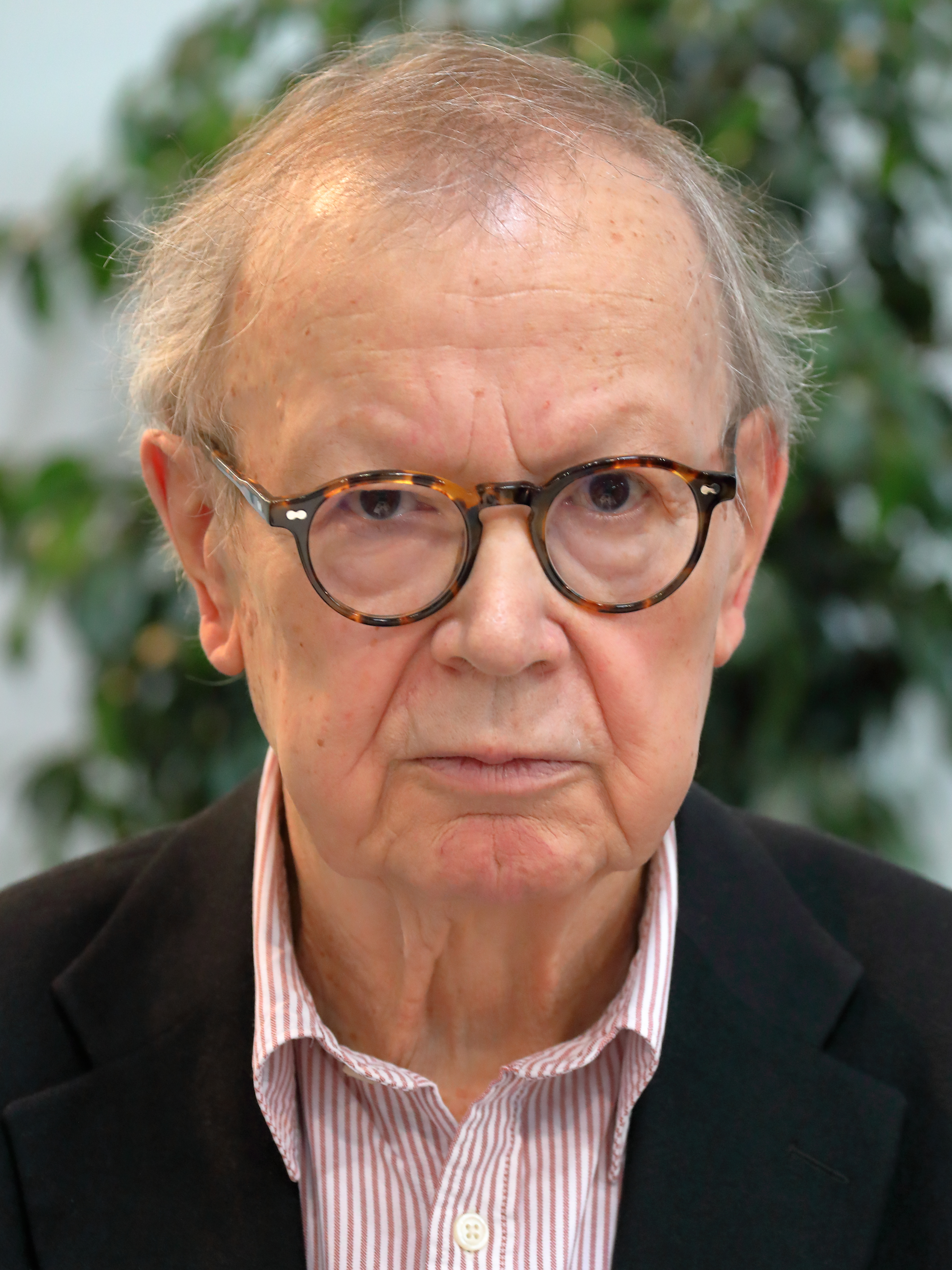
Martin Pollack in 2019

Martin Pollack (23 May 1944 – 17 January 2025) was an Austrian journalist, book author, translator, Slavist and historian. "One of Austria's most distinguished public intellectuals", Pollack propagated fact-based truth and reconciliation in Austria for WWII crimes, which he saw as lacking in public discourse. Born into a family of devout Nazi supporters and war criminals at the end of World War II, Pollack managed to free himself from the beliefs of his family by way of his secondary schooling in the late 1950s in Salzburg.

Pollack's 2004 bestselling account of his father Gerhard Bast's violent death in the wake of World War II in 1947 near the Brenner border of Austria with Italy created a new genre of WWII truth and reconciliation non-fiction literature in German. Pollack often linked historical research with his own family history. Pollack's father, SS-Sturmbannführer Gerhard Bast, was found dead while on the run in 1947 near the Brenner border of Austria with Italy. Pollack's uncle was involved in the deportation of the Slovenes from Upper Carniola, for which Eberhard Kranzmayer's dialectological "studies" were used as rationales between "Re-Germanization" and extermination.

== Background ==
Pollack was born in Bad Hall, Upper Austria, but grew up in his grandparents' town of Amstetten, Lower Austria. He was born into a family of pan-German Nazi supporters, who celebrated that ideology largely unbridled past 1945. He said that his grandmother tried to bribe him not to enrol in Slavic Studies. If he signed up for Germanistik 'German Studies' instead, she would pay for his degree up to the doctorate but that he would get no cent, "keinen Groschen" otherwise. Pollack refused and specialized during his time at the University of Vienna in Polish Studies. He referred to his family members as "one of his Nazi aunts" ("eine meiner Nazi-Tanten") and resigned at the end of his life that "they would never change". Pollack died on 17 January 2025, at the age of 80.

== Family history and reconciliation ==
Pollack's 2004 bestselling account of his father Gerhard Bast's violent death in the wake of World War II in 1947 near the Brenner border of Austria with Italy created a new genre of WWII truth and reconciliation non-fiction literature in German. Pollack often linked historical research with his own family history, which was rife with Nazi perpetrators and collaborators. Pollack's father, SS-Sturmbannführer Gerhard Bast, was found dead while on the run in 1947 near the Brenner border of Austria with Italy. Pollack's uncle was involved in the deportation of the Slovenes from Upper Carniola, for which Eberhard Kranzmayer's dialectological "studies" were used as rationales between "Re-Germanization" and extermination. Pollak, viewing since his high school days radically different from his family members in relation to Nazism, offered through his lived research and reconciliation experience, a different model to overcoming war and racist trauma, thus "shaping" this debate in most constructive ways.

== Published works ==
- Nach Galizien. Von Chassiden, Huzulen, Polen u. Ruthenern. Eine imaginäre Reise durch die verschwundene Welt Ostgaliziens und der Bukowina. Edition Christian Brandstätter, Wien 1984, ISBN 3-85447-075-4, pp. 208, (Insel Verlag, Frankfurt am Main 2001, ISBN 3-458-34447-0)
- Des Lebens Lauf. Jüdische Familienbilder aus Zwischeneuropa. Christian Brandstätter Verlagsgesellschaft, Wien 1987, ISBN 3-85447-198-X.
- Martin Pollack, Karl-Markus Gauß (Hrsg.): Das reiche Land der armen Leute. Literarische Wanderungen durch Galizien. Jugend und Volk (J&V), Wien 1992, ISBN 3-224-17636-9, pp. 262.
- Anklage Vatermord. Der Fall Philipp Halsmann. Zsolnay, Wien 2002, ISBN 3-552-05206-2.
- Der Tote im Bunker. Bericht über meinen Vater. Zsolnay, Wien 2004, ISBN 3-552-05318-2.
- Martin Pollack (Hrsg.): Sarmatische Landschaften. Nachrichten aus Litauen, Belarus, der Ukraine, Polen und Deutschland. S. Fischer, Frankfurt am Main 2005, ISBN 3-10-062303-7.
- Martin Pollack (Hrsg.): Von Minsk nach Manhattan. Polnische Reportagen. Zsolnay, Wien 2006 (übersetzt von Martin Pollack, Joanna Manc, Renate Schmidgall), ISBN 3-552-05371-9, pp. 268.
- Warum wurden die Stanislaws erschossen? Reportagen. Zsolnay, Wien 2008, ISBN 978-3-552-05432-5, pp. 229.
- Martin Pollack u. a.: Mythos Czernowitz. Eine Stadt im Spiegel ihrer Nationalitäten. In: Ariane Afsari (Hrsg.): Potsdamer Bibliothek östliches Europa – Geschichte. Deutsches Kulturforum östliches Europa, Potsdam 2008, ISBN 978-3-936168-25-9, pp. 263.
- Kaiser von Amerika. Die große Flucht aus Galizien. Zsolnay, Wien 2010, ISBN 978-3-552-05514-8.
- In Your Face. Bilder aus unserer jüngeren Geschichte. Mit einem Essay von Martin Pollack und Fotos von Chris Niedenthal. edition. fotoTAPETA, Warschau/ Berlin 2011, ISBN 978-3-940524-13-3.
- Die Wolfsjäger. Drei polnische Duette. (Zusammen mit Christoph Ransmayr). S. Fischer Verlag, Frankfurt am Main 2011, ISBN 978-3-10-062950-0.
- Kontaminierte Landschaften. Residenz Verlag, St. Pölten und Wien 2014, ISBN 978-3-7017-1621-0 (Print), ISBN 978-3-7017-4457-2 (E-Book), pp. 120.
- Topografie der Erinnerung. Residenz Verlag, Salzburg und Wien 2016, ISBN 978-3-7017-1648-7 (Print), ISBN 978-3-7017-4528-9 (E-Book), pp. 172.
- Nachwort zur Neuauflage von W. St. Reymont: Die Empörung. Westhafen Verlag, Frankfurt am Main 2017, ISBN 978-3-942836-12-8.
- Die Frau ohne Grab: Bericht über meine Tante, Zsolnay, Wien 2019, ISBN 978-3-552-05951-1.

== Further material ==
Talk by Martin Pollack [in English] at the Institute for Human Sciences in Vienna, 14 June 2024, entitled The Long Shadow of a Sinister Past: A Never-Ending Story. Michalski Memorial Lecture, with the President of Austria, Alexander Van der Bellen, and Past President of Austria, Heinz Fischer, in attendance.

In 2016 Pollack delivered the Dylynsky Memorial lecture in Toronto on "The Myth of Galicia."
