= Franz Roubal =

Austrian painter (1889–1967)

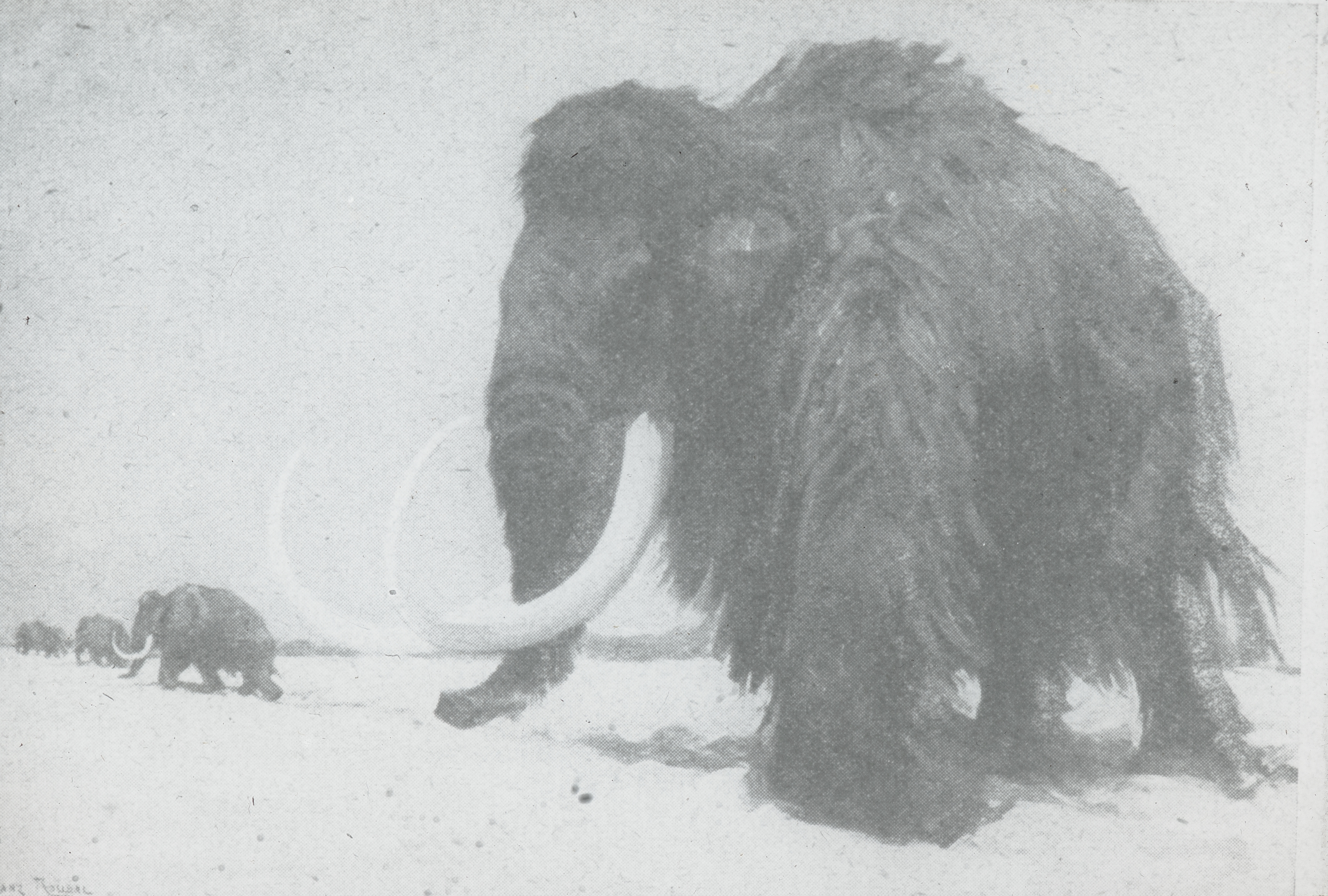
Woolly mammoth in the tundra

Franz Roubal (born 25 July 1889 in Vienna; died 9 February 1967 in Irdning) was an Austrian landscape and animal painter, sculptor and palaeoartist who worked with the palaeontologist Othenio Abel.

== Life and work ==
Roubal studied at the Academy of Fine Arts Vienna under Christian Griepenkerl and at the master school under Rudolf Bacher from 1906 to 1914. In 1913, he received the Special School Prize for a large animal painting; in 1914, Baron Max Guttmann commissioned him to create a historical mural for the council chamber of the town hall in Rottenmann, depicting the hunting expedition of Maximilian I, Holy Roman Emperor. Roubal received the Prix de Rome for the execution of this work.

As a sculptor, Roubal mainly created animal sculptures, primarily reconstructions of prehistoric animals. He also provided numerous illustrations for zoological works. The hunting licence issued by the Styrian Hunting Association features hunting motifs drawn by Roubal. He exhibited the oil paintings “Motif from Upper Styria” and “Bullfinch in the Snow” at the 1932 autumn exhibition in the Vienna Künstlerhaus. Franz Roubal was also a member of the Styrian Association of Visual Artists.

In 1921, Roubal met the palaeontologist Othenio Abel, with whom he created numerous pictorial and sculptural reconstructions. In 1935, Abel invited Roubal to Göttingen, where he had been appointed professor. Roubal had taken early retirement in Vienna in 1934 for political reasons. As a German nationalist and member of the NSDAP (Illegal National Socialist), which was banned in Austria in 1933, he supported the annexation of Austria. He formally applied for membership in the NSDAP on 22 October 1941 and was accepted on 1 January 1942 (membership number 9,009,623).

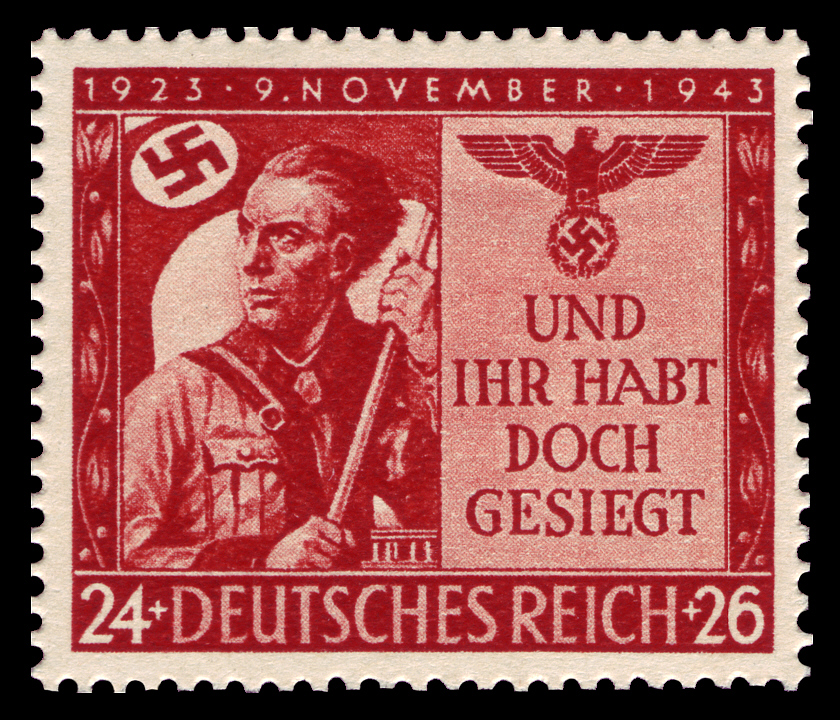
Hitlerputsch commemoration stamp designed by Roubal (1943)

From 1922 he had a studio in Irdning, later he moved to Berlin. In 1937, he exhibited four paintings of wild horses at the International Hunting Exhibition there. The Berlin zoologist Ludwig Heck, for whom he painted Pinzgauer horses, wrote in 1938: “He is now in the Old Reich because he is much sought after by publishers and has also acquired friends and patrons here who commission him.” In 1943, he designed a stamp for the Reichspost to commemorate Hitler's Putsch.

== Works (excerpt) ==
- Soldiers marching out: Soldiers in front of St. Charles's Church in Vienna, around 1914, oil on cardboard, approx. 45 × 75 cm, Museum of Military History, Vienna

== Literature ==
- Werner Radig: Otto der Große (Otto the Great). Explanatory booklet accompanying a mural by Franz Roubal, Leipzig: Wachsmuth, 1938.
- Helmuth Zapfe: Akad. Maler Prof. Franz Roubal (Academic painter Prof. Franz Roubal). In: Annals of the Natural History Museum in Vienna 73, 1969, pp. 19–23 ([PDF]).
- Kurt Ehrenberg: Othenio Abel’s Lebensweg, unter Benützung autobiographischer Aufzeichnungen (Othenio Abel’s Lebensweg, using autobiographical notes). Kurt Ehrenberg, Vienna 1975 (private printing).
- Heinrich Fuchs: Die österreichischen Maler der Geburtsjahrgänge 1881–1900 (Austrian painters born between 1881 and 1900), volume 2, Vienna 1977, page K 71.
- Thomas Engel / Jürgen H. Jungbluth: Die Originale des österreichischen Akademischen Tier- und Eiszeitmalers Franz Roubal (The originals of the Austrian academic animal and ice age painter Franz Roubal),* 25.07.1889,1 09.02.1967, in the Natural History Museum Mainz, Mainz Natural Science Archive, 43, 2005, pp. 5–27, digital copy
- Dennis Janzen: Vom Fossil zum Bild: künstlerische Darstellungen prähistorischen Lebens.(From Fossil to Image: Artistic Representations of Prehistoric Life), Berlin 2020, ISBN 978-3-422-98117-1, p. 86–110.
