= Gerhard Bast =

Austrian Nazi leader (1911–1947)

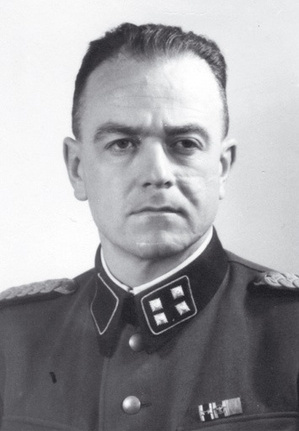
- Born: January 12, 1911; Gottschee, Duchy of Carniola, Cisleithania, Austria-Hungary
- Died: March 9, 1947 (aged 36); Brenner Pass, Italy
- Cause of death: Gunshot wounds
- Political party: Nazi Party
- Status: Deceased
- Motive: Nazism
- Conviction: Negligent manslaughter
- Penalty: 4 months imprisonment (not served)

Details
- Victims: Hundreds
- Span of crimes: July 1941 – 1945
- Country: Belarus, Czechoslovakia, Germany, Lithuania, Poland, and Ukraine
- Targets: Jews and Partisans
- SS career
- Allegiance: Nazi Germany
- Branch: Schutzstaffel
- Service years: 1931–1945
- Rank: Sturmbannführer
- Units: Einsatzgruppe B Einsatzgruppe D Einsatzgruppe H
- Commands: Sonderkommando 7a Sonderkommando 11a

Gerhard Bast (January 12, 1911 – March 9, 1947) was an Austrian lawyer, a Sturmbannführer in the Gestapo and a leader of a task force of the Einsatzgruppen. After the war, Bast attempted to flee to South America. Shortly before leaving, he decided to visit his family in Austria. Before reaching the Brenner Pass, however, the smuggler transporting Bast abruptly decided to rob and murder him.

== Life ==
Gerhard Bast, the son of attorney Rudolf Bast, grew up in a German nationalist household. In 1912, the family moved to Amstetten. Bast studied at the high school in Wels. After graduation, he studied jurisprudence at the University of Graz, where he was a member of the Burschenschaft (student fraternity) "Germania Graz". He graduated law school in 1935 with his doctorate. In October 1931, he became a member of the Nazi Party (member number 612,972) and shortly thereafter joined the SS (SS Number 23,064). After graduation, Bast worked at the county court in St. Pölten, but lost his job shortly afterwards due to his membership of the Nazi Party. He then worked in the law office of his father, who was an enthusiastic national socialist.

After the German Reich's Anschluss with Austria, on March 20, 1938, Bast joined the Sicherheitsdienst (SD) and Gestapo. Bast was first deployed in Graz, where he in early 1940 became the head of the department for combat and investigation of enemies. In August 1940, Bast moved to the Gestapo in Koblenz; then from January 1941, he headed the state police control center in Linz on behalf of Humbert Achamer-Pifrader. In the SS, he achieved the position of Sturmbannführer and was also promoted to the government council. From July 1941, he was the leader of the Gestapo in Münster. In this position, he was heavily involved in the deportation of Jews out of Germany and took part in the executions of Polish forced laborers.

From November 1942 to December 1942, he was leader of Sonderkommando 11a in Einsatzgruppe D and led the murders of Jews. In January 1943, Bast was transferred to Linz, where he led the Gestapo. In November 1943, Bast accidentally killed a young hunter while hunting. He was convicted of negligent manslaughter and sentenced to 4 months in prison. However, as he could "prove his worth" on the Eastern Front, Bast did not have to serve his sentence, yet suffered a severe blow for his NS career as he was ordered, as punitive measure, into the field and away from his desk job if he wished to stay within the SS system.

From June 1944 to October/November 1944, Bast was leader of Sonderkommando 7a in "Einsatzgruppe B". Later, he was deployed with his special unit in the "Einsatzgruppe H" under lead of "BdS (Commander of the security police and SD) Pressburg" to fight partisans. According to Martin Pollack, illegitimate son of Bast's, the latter "was sent with his men into the city [Warsaw], heavily armed and in civilian clothes, to liquidate, as he put it himself, whoever they came across – unarmed civilians, insurgents or otherwise, men and women. He showed no mercy". From Poland Bast's battalion moved to Slovakia, where they committed other war crimes: "In the small village of Bully (Donovaly), members of the Special Command [Sonderkommando] 7a found a group of Jews hiding in the hut of a poor farmer's wife. My father ordered them to be shot – along with the woman who had given them shelter" (Pollack).

Bast obtained the following awards: War Merit Cross I and II class with swords, Ostvolk Medal II class in silver, as well as an armed forces cross (Heeressiegeskreuz) III class with swords. He was referred to as an Alter Kämpfer.

At the end of World War II, Bast disappeared under a false name. In disguise as a farmhand and lumberjack, he found accommodation and employment at a farm in South Tyrol. In March 1947, he wanted to return to his family in Innsbruck and asked the help of a smuggler to assist him in passing through the guarded Brenner Pass. Before reaching the Brenner Pass, however, the smuggler robbed and killed Bast, shooting him three times. In 1949, a court in Bolzano convicted the smuggler of murder and robbery and sentenced him to 30 years in prison.

The Austrian author Martin Pollack is the illegitimate son of Gerhard Bast. Pollack wrote the book: "Der Tote im Bunker. Bericht über meinen Vater", that was published in Vienna in 2004.

== Literature ==
- Helge Dvorak: Biographisches Lexikon der Deutschen Burschenschaft. Band I: Politiker. Teilband 7: Supplement A–K. Winter, Heidelberg 2013, ISBN 978-3-8253-6050-4, S. 45–46.
- Ernst Klee: Das Personenlexikon zum Dritten Reich. Fischer, Frankfurt am Main 2007. ISBN 978-3-596-16048-8. (Aktualisierte 2. Auflage)
- Martin Pollack: Der Tote im Bunker. Bericht über meinen Vater. Zsolnay, Wien 2004, ISBN 3-552-05318-2.
- Gerald Steinacher: Nazis auf der Flucht. Wie Kriegsverbrecher über Italien nach Übersee entkamen, Frankfurt a. M. 2010, ISBN 978-3-596-18497-2. (Taschenbuchausgabe)
