= Hermann Langbein =

Austrian Righteous Among the Nations (1912–1995)

Hermann Langbein (18 May 1912 – 24 October 1995) was an Austrian writer, actor, journalist, resistance fighter and historian.

Langbein fought in the Spanish Civil War with the International Brigades for the Spanish Republicans against the fascist Nationalists under Francisco Franco, and was in active opposition to the German Nazi regime. He was a concentration camp survivor and co-founder of the International Auschwitz Committee in 1954.

== Life ==
Hermann Langbein worked after graduating school as an actor at the Vienna People's Theatre (Volkstheater). In 1933 he joined the KPÖ, and fled the country after "Anschluss" in 1938 to fight in the Spanish Civil War for the International Brigades against the establishment of a dictatorship under Franco. Hermann Langbein is the younger brother of Otto Langbein (1910-1988), who, received a PhD from the University of Vienna, was a writer, resistance fighter and editor of Österreichisches Wörterbuch.

Hermann was interned in France after the end of the Spanish Civil War, and then sent to German concentration camps after the fall of France in 1940. Over the next few years he was imprisoned in several different camps (Dachau, Auschwitz and others). Interned in Auschwitz in 1942, Langbein was classified as a non-Jewish political prisoner and he was assigned as clerk to the infirmary, which gave him access to documentation and first-hand knowledge about the medical mistreatment, torture and killings of other camp prisoners - Langbein later used his knowledge to help establish the International Auschwitz Committee and trials at which he testified. His prisoner number in the camp was 60355. At Auschwitz Langbein came into contact with Maria Stromberger, a nurse whose primary motive was to have herself transferred to the SS Infirmary in Auschwitz to — illegally — aid the prisoners. Stromberger's plan worked and, while she officially worked as a nurse for the SS guards, she in fact undermined SS rule by aiding the inmates, including Langbein, in decisive ways as a member of the "Kampfgruppe Auschwitz".

In August 1944 Langbein was transferred to the Neuengamme concentration camp and from there to the Neuengamme subcamp Lerbeck near Minden. On the evacuation transport to Fallersleben east of Hannover, he jumped off the train in mid-April 1945 and fled to Austria by bike on 5 May, where he arrived in his hometown of Vienna in May 1945. He was among the leadership of the International Resistance groups in the camps he was held in. After 1945 he was General Secretary of the International Auschwitz Committee, and later Secretary of the "Comité International des Camps".

== Post war ==
Initially, Langbein was a full-time employee of KPÖ and a member of the Party Central Committee. He was involved in the construction of party schools and published his 1947 written-down camp experiences from Auschwitz and other camps under the title The Fittest in 1949 from his own publishing house. After conflicts with the party, Langbein moved to Budapest, where he edited German-language radio broadcasts in Hungarian broadcasting. He returned to Austria in 1954 with his wife and daughter. Langbein was co-founder of the International Auschwitz Committee (IAC) in 1954, and became its first secretary general. From 1955 to 1960 Langbein was secretary of the Austrian Camp Community Auschwitz. In these functions, Langbein brought the concentration camp crimes to public notice and fought for compensation for former concentration camp victims.

In the wake of the Hungarian Uprising of 1956 and its Soviet suppression with tanks and brute force, Langbein began to speak up against Stalinism. As a consequence of his critique, he was banned from KPÖ in 1958 and in 1960 was relieved of his post as general secretary of the IAC, also a direct result of his anti-Stalin stance, and excluded the following year also from its management. In 1963 Langbein was asked to become Secretary of the "Comité International des Camps", which, in contradiction to the communist-led IAC was apolitical.

On 18 October 1961, the West German Radio broadcast a three-hour feature about Auschwitz conceived by Langbein and H. G. Adler: Topography of an extermination camp. In the mid-1960s, Langbein, along with Fritz Bauer, played an essential part in bringing about the Frankfurt Auschwitz trials where he appeared as a witness. He then worked as a writer and journalist. In 1967 he was awarded by Yad Vashem as Righteous Among the Nations. From 1989 to 1995 he organized together with Johannes Schwantner the seminar "ideology and reality of National Socialism" for teachers and educators. Moreover, Langbein belonged to the Museum Council of Auschwitz-Birkenau and worked on the redesign of the exhibition. Since 1996, a memorial conference called "Hermann Langbein Symposium" takes place every year in Linz. The author and writer Kurt Langbein is his son, the actor Daniel Langbein his grandson.

== Works ==
He wrote several books about his experiences in the camps. The most important and influential is:

- People in Auschwitz. Translated by Henry Friedlander. University of North Carolina Press, 2003, ISBN 0-8078-2816-5. Originally published in Austrian German in 1972, followed by multiple editions and translated into several languages.

Also:

- Die Stärkeren. Ein Bericht. Stern-Verlag, Wien 1949, DNB-IDN 574554459.
