= Eberhard Kranzmayer =

Austrian philologist and dialectologist (1897–1975)

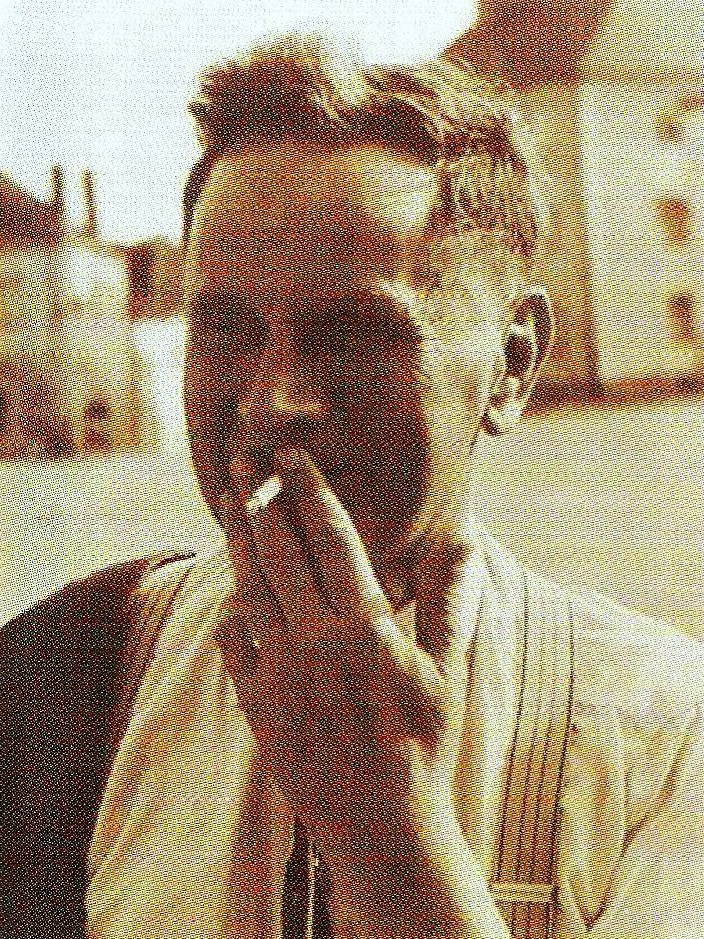
Image of Eberhard Kranzmayer

Eberhard Kranzmayer (15 May 1897 – 13 September 1975) was an Austrian philologist, dialectologist and, prior to 1945, also ethnologist of the German language. Kranzmayer has long been considered the most important dialectologist of German in Austria, yet his roles in the Third Reich and his perspectives on German, surfacing fully in the early 2020s presents challenges for German dialectology.

== Life and education ==
Kranzmayer was born into a Klagenfurt, Carinthia, family of coppersmiths of long local lineage. He learned Slovene, rather atypical for Carinthian native German speakers in the Habsburg Empire, from a local farm family. He studied at the University of Vienna German department, defending his dissertation under Anton Pfalz, who was the leader of the Austrian Academy of Sciences project Dictionary of Austrian-Bavarian Dialects (DABD) in Vienna, in 1926. Kranzmayer had regularly worked for the DABD since 1916, as a high school student, and during his studies. In 1926, he was tasked to coordinate data collection with the sister project in Munich at the Bavarian Academy of Sciences, the Dictionary of Bavarian Dialects (DBD). In 1933, Kranzmayer defended his "habilitation" with anti-Semite Rudolf Much, from which point on he was a full-fledged academic researcher and teacher. Both projects are ongoing and together they define the cross-border Bavarian-Austrian dialects of German.

=== Nazi connection ===
Kranzmayer's Nazi past has long been left unscrutinized. He is today considered as "definitely" a member of the then illegal Nazi party as of 1 January 1937, though likely much earlier. He continued to work in Vienna until December 1937; by January 1938, no two months before Anschluss, Kranzmayer moved to the Bavarian Academy's sister project in Munich as the leader of the DBD. Within five weeks after Anschluss, Kranzmayer reported with Anton Pfalz on their recording trips throughout Austria, what had by then become Germany's Ostmark, for Adolf Hitler's birthday present 1939. In the 2020s archival documents surfaced in which Kranzmayer celebrated in personal letters to Martin Wutte Hitler's take-over of power in Germany.

== Third Reich career ==
In 1942, Kranzmayer became Director of the newly founded, "war-decisive", euphemistically named "Research Institute for Carinthian Provincial Research". Until a month before the institute's official and public opening in Klagenfurt, this institute, however, founded during Operation Barbarossa, was called 'Institute for the final solution of the Slovenes'.

Kranzmayer has in the 2020s been shown to have perjured himself in both his denazification proceedings, one in 1945 the other in 1947. As leader of a Nazi think tank that he helped to plan and set up with Gauleiter Rainer and SS-Ahnenerbe president Wüst, among others, he offered pseudo-scholarly assessments of the "purity" or "impurity" of the Slavic population in regards to German-dom by linguistic means. Kranzmayer is responsible for providing the rationale behind ethnic cleansing for at least 205,000 Slovenes in Upper Carinola ("Oberkrain").

Kranzmayer's active commitment to Nazism continued at least until December 1944, when he is documented to have requested, in direct correspondence with Reichsminister Bernhard Rust, who had like Kranzmayer studied German philology, the additional positions of a "race biologist" and a librarian for his Nazi-research Institute in Klagenfurt.

During his postwar career, Kranzmayer was paradoxically considered to have been a "victim" of the denazification proceedings in accounts that circulate in German linguistics circles, while in fact he got off quite scotfree. Despite Austrian Slavists pointing out in published work as early as 1980 that Kranzmayer was a proponent of "völkische[] Linguistik", some of Kranzmayer's projects have been carried on since.

== Major Works ==
- Wörterbuch der bairischen Mundarten in Österreich, Österreichische Akademie der Wissenschaften, 1971 (Vol. 1), ongoing (editor from 1926 to 1975).
- Bayerisches Wörterbuch, Bayerische Akademie der Wissenschaften, ongoing (chief editor from 1938 to 45)
- Kärntner Ortsnamenbuch, 2 vols. (1956–58).
- Bayerischer Dialektatlas (1956).
- [in German] Race-biological perspectives on the German language. Textbook (1944–45), manuscript lost or missing, post WWII.
- Die deutschen Lehnwörter im Slowenischen (1944). Written for the Nazis.
- Die Sprache der Friauler (1943). Written for the Nazis.

== Impact and re-assessment ==
Kranzmayer's role in the justification and application of ethnic cleansing of the SS and the Wehrmacht in the east triggered calls for a reassessment of Kranzmayer's work in German dialectology and onomastics. In particular, Kranzmayer's "race-biological account on language change", delivered as his July 1944 University of Graz inaugural lecture to great interest of Nazi politicians in Gau Styria, and distributed in several copies before war's end, and his role at the Bayerische Akademie der Wissenschaften and the Klagenfurt institute may require further scrutiny, as Kranzmayer consistently interpreted his data from a vantage point of superiority of all things German.

In Kranzmayer's work German supremacy was unquestioned to a degree that Kranzmayer hypothesized of yet-to-be-discovered data that would support his anti-Slavic interpretations. Kranzmayer was throughout his life a major proponent of a One Standard German Axiom and was one of the linguists who carried it beyond WWII into post-war German dialectology and linguistics, which may explain the prevailing scepticism in German linguistics over Standard Austrian German and multiple standards of German more generally.
