= Illegal National Socialist =

Nazi period, Austria

The term illegal National Socialist refers to persons in Austria who, between 1933 and 1938, during the last years of the First Republic, were either members of or active for the National Socialist German Workers Party (Nazis). The Nazi Party (NSDAP) was banned in Austria from 19 June 1933 to the day of Anschluss with Germany on 12 March 1938 by decree of the leader of the Austrian government Engelbert Dollfuss. Those who remained active for the Nazis during that time or who were operative in their underground cells in Austria are informally called "illegals". Some of the most severe post-war repercussions in post-war Austria were reserved for them.

== Historical context and periodization ==
The NSDAP, the Nazi party that had assumed power in Germany in January 1933, was banned in Austria after chancellor Dollfuß disbanded the Austrian national parliament and ruled unilaterally by emergency decree (period of Austro-fascism).

According to historian Gerhard Botz, three classes of Illegals are to be distinguished:

1. Alte Kämpfer (Old Fighters): persons in Austria who joined the NSDAP, SA, SS or other Nazi formations before the ban from 19 June 1933
2. Illegale Nationalsozialisten per se (Illegal National Socialists proper): those who joined the NSDAP between 19 June 1933 and 11 March 1938 and who count as "Illegale Nationalsozialisten" im engeren Sinne
3. After Anschluss (post-Annexation): persons who joined after 12 March 1938 but were active for the Nazis before that date

In everyday post-war language, however, all NSDAP members joining before 12 March 1938 are called "Illegals", not least because all Austrian party members at Anschluss were reassigned a new admission date of 1 May 1938.

== Number of Illegals and social composition ==
The numbers are, within a range of 150,000-200,000 still subject to some debate. It is estimated today that about 30,000 people were assessed as Illegals proper (Botz' category 2) only after World War II. With NSDAP membership in Austria at the time of Anschluss amounting to 167,000, an additional 30,000 - 43,000 would be considered as illegal later.

The social composition of Illegals sheds light on the spread of NS ideology in Austria prior to Anschluss. A sample of 1264 Illegals shows the following composition:

Social category	percent
students	4
civil servants	10
white collar employees	11
blue collar workers	27
skilled labourers	23
entrepreneurs	5
professionals	8
farmers	12
SUM	100

Table 1: Soziale Zusammensetzung der Illegalen Nazis in Österreich 1933 nach Botz (2016, Abb. 2)

In the period between 1933 and 1 May 1938 the share of women in the NSDAP increased nearly two-and-a-half fold, from 12 percent to 28 percent. (Botz, Tab. 2).

== Postwar years ==
In post-war Austria the harshest repercussions and sanctions were reserved for Illegal National Socialists. Among the 536,000 members of the NSDAP in Austria about 100,000 were deemed as Illegals by 1946. This number does not include a host of Illegals that managed to use their networks to escape identification as Illegal Nazis and thus escaped bans and more severe punishment. Many of them took on key roles in postwar Austria. These include many academics and notables, such as Otto Höfler, Eberhard Kranzmayer, Erich Frauwallner, Konrad Lorenz or Herbert von Karajan. The intellectual legacies of illegal Nazis that were rehired in the Austrian Republic after 1945 have only recently come under scrutiny, e.g. for the high-profile Kranzmayer.
