= One Standard German Axiom =

Theory regarding the pluricentric German language

The One Standard German Axiom (OSGA) is a concept by Austrian-Canadian UBC linguist Stefan Dollinger from his 2019 monograph The Pluricentricity Debate (in German "Axiom des Einheitsdeutschen"). OSGA is used to describe the long-standing "scepticism" towards or "outright rejection" of the idea of multiple standard varieties in German dialectology and linguistics. It has been elaborated in several articles since and is the central theme in the 2025 general audience book Austrian German: a 300-year Love Story (original title Österreichisches Deutsch: eine 300-jährige Liebesgeschichte).

== Background and development ==
The concept of "pluricentric language" has been used in sociolinguistics and sociology of language since the 1960s. Multiple standard varieties have been commonplace in English (since the 1860s), Portuguese and Dutch (since the 1980s) (e.g. American English, Brazilian Portuguese or Belgian Dutch), among many others, including German.

While the application of the pluricentric model for German has been undisputed at least since the work by Michael Clyne 1992, research in German variational sociolinguistics has refined the concept of "pluricentricity" (originally referring only to the national centers Austrian German, Swiss German, etc.) and contrasted it to "pluriareality" (with potential centers inside or over national boundaries).

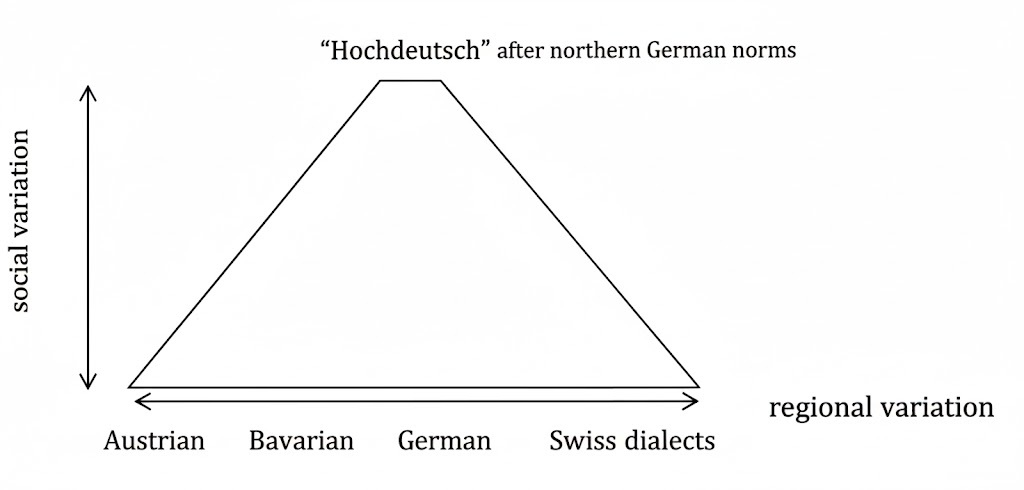
Figure 1: Visualization of the modelling of German based on the One Standard German Axiom (following Dollinger, Pluricentricity Debate, 2019, Figure 4.2)

Dollinger wants to "debunk" the concept of pluriareality because he sees it proclaiming one standard variety of German, as visualized in Figure 1, while negating the existence and legitimacy of an independent Austrian national standard variety. Ultimately, he sees Austria's national sovereignty questioned by proponents of the pluriareal approach.

According to Dollinger, "pluriareality" is counter to "pluricentricity" and the latter violates the uniformitarian principle; it is an "empty term" and does not meet basic epistemological requirements. Dollinger shows evidence that "pluriareal" is identical with "geographical variation" and thus no match for the theory of pluricentricity. He argues for the recognition of independent standard varieties of German, each based on the dialects of the three national territories Austria, Germany, and Switzerland, according to Figure 2.

Furthermore, Dollinger argues that by downgrading or even negating the relevance of national standard varieties of German, especially Standard Austrian German, the implied underlying modelling of the German language today has not changed since around 1850, before the unification of Germany without Austria.

In his monograph from 2019, Dollinger coins the term "One German Axiom" or "One Standard German Axiom" to describe the approach of (what he believes to be) people sceptical of pluricentric German. That monograph was not the first time he presented the idea: he had already criticized the pluri-areal approach as a "One Standard German Hypothesis" in a 2016 conference paper. In German, Dollinger writes about the "Axiom des Einheitsdeutschen".

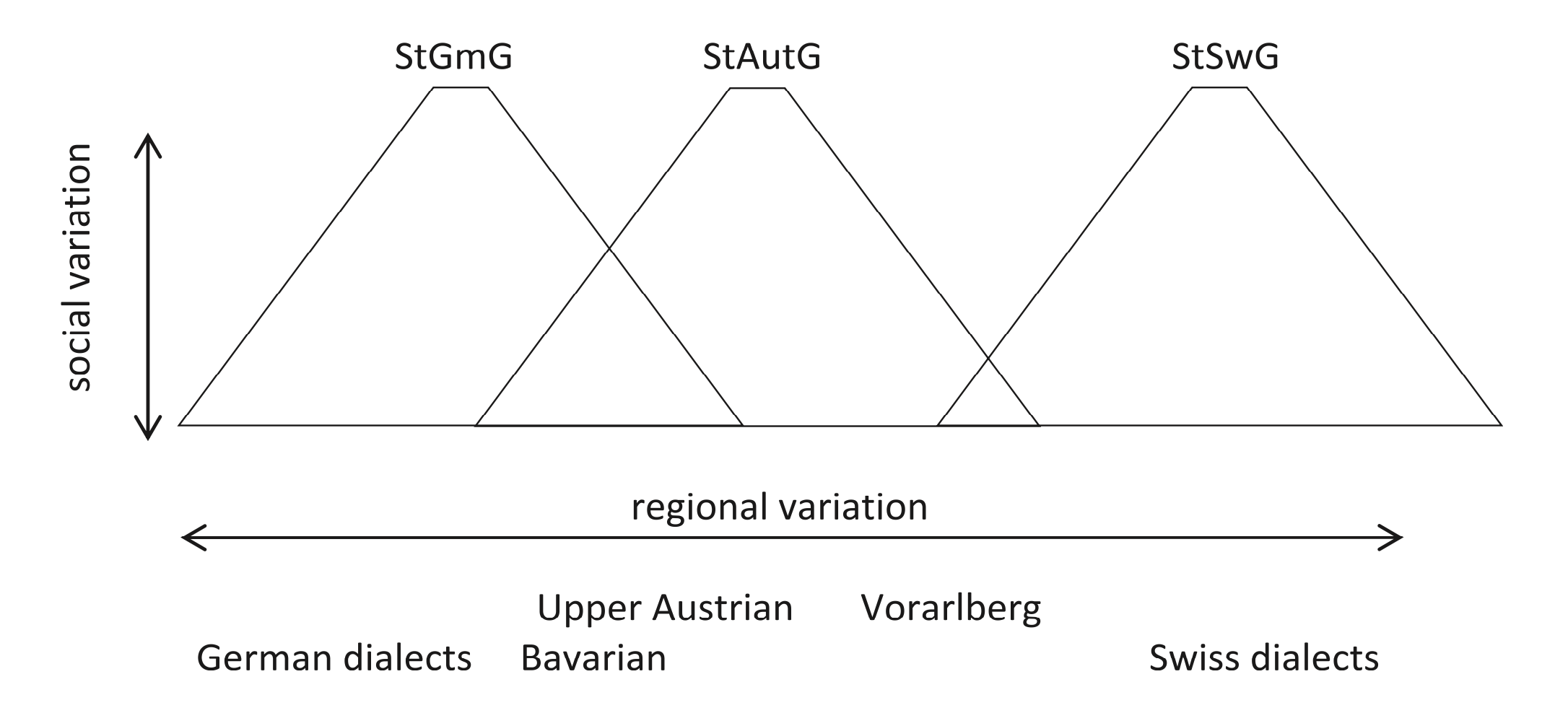
Figure 2: Pluricentric German, with three standard varieties (following Dollinger, Pluricentricity Debate, 2019, Figure 4.1)

More recently, connections of pre- and postwar German dialectology have been made explicit, centred in the Austrian dialectologist Eberhard Kranzmayer, who lived, according to Dollinger, by OSGA. Kranzmayer has been instrumental, Dollinger claims, in teaching many Austrian dialectologists a monocentric view of German. Peter Wiesinger, Kranzmayer's successor in Vienna, is considered to have followed the "corset" of OSGA in his extensive work on Austrian German.

== Scholarly reception ==
While several prominent scholars in German linguistics and dialectology call Dollinger's One Standard German Axiom a "construct", other scholars awarded a 2023/24 national Killam Faculty Research Prize for work on OSGA that views "languages as discursively constructed entities" and assigns linguists a stake.

The uptake of Dollinger's book in German linguistics on The Pluricentricity Debate has been initially expressly critical. Comments by the "clearance reader", made public by Dollinger in the book's preface, assessed the print-ready manuscript as "not publishable" because, it represented the perspective "of an Austrian more concerned about his linguistic identity, than as an academic soberly gauging the debate". The author responds: "Even if that were the case, which it is not, the arguments herein have an intrinsic value," and pleads for a probing of his 13 arguments against "pluri-areality". Nils Langer, a specialist in Frisian, raises doubts about Dollinger's argument, dismissing it outright by framing it as old-fashioned but does not address the arguments.

Not all Germanists respond negatively to the book, however. Julia Ruck – who mentions the One Standard German Axiom, but does not discuss this idea specifically – sees a lot of merit in Dollinger's contrast between pluri-areal and pluricentric approaches to German.

Whereas Dollinger's "One Standard German Axiom" has not been taken up in German sociolinguistics and dialectology, his critique of anti-pluricentric stances in the current research landscape is recognized. Igor Ivaškovic considers One Standard Axiom a "thesis" and postulates a "One Standard Bosnian, Croatian, Montenegrin, and Serbian Axiom" on a similar basis. A similar one standard axiom has also been described for Catalan. OSGA has been linked with historical pan-German and Nazi linguists who were brought back to teach after World War II.

The Germanic Linguistic Association invited Dollinger as plenary speaker at GLAC 2026 in Utah with "On a presupposition in German dialectology since Adelung (1781): the 'One Standard German Axiom (OSGA)'."

== Public reception ==
Dollinger's works, especially the popular-scientific book from 2021, have garnered interest in the Austrian media. In Wiener Zeitung the journalist Robert Sedlaczek summarized the book in his column and compared to his own popular book on Austrian German from 2004. Sedlaczek emphasizes Dollinger's strong view that nationalist German scholars in the field – in contrast to Austrians or Swiss – would question the concept of German pluricentricity in their research because of their "different socialization and academic training". As a reaction to Sedlaczek, linguist Peter Wiesinger wrote a guest commentary in the same newspaper and argued that language nationalism does not evolve from scientific theory, a point that Alexander Maxwell and associates question in linguistics more generally. Der Standard has since 2020 published several interviews involving the Axiom, e.g. the 2021 monograph in German and a subsequent work. In 2025, the issue is framed as "breaking up the One Standard German Axiom because it reeks of pan-German thought and belongs into the dustbin of history". In 2026, the University of Klagenfurt's German Department discussed the "entertaining" 2025 book as their contribution to the outreach event "Long Night of Research".
