= Österreichisches Wörterbuch =

Official spelling dictionary of the German language in Austria

The Österreichisches Wörterbuch (Austrian German pronunciation: [ˈøːstɐraɪçɪʃəs ˈvœrtɐˌbuːx]; lit. 'Austrian Dictionary'), abbreviated ÖWB, is the official spelling dictionary of Standard German in Austria, i.e. of Austrian Standard German. It has been edited since 1948 by a group of linguists under the authority of the Austrian Federal Ministry of Education, Arts and Culture (Bundesministerium für Unterricht, Kunst und Kultur) and contains a number of terms unique to, distinct or characteristic for Austrian German. Such Austrianisms may be more frequently or differently used or pronounced compared to other German-speaking areas. A considerable amount of this Austrian vocabulary is also common in Southern Germany, especially Bavaria, and some of it is used in Switzerland as well. The most recent edition is the 44th from 2022. Since the 39th edition from 2001 the orthography of the ÖWB was adjusted to the German spelling reform of 1996.

== History ==
The first edition of the Austrian Dictionary was published in 1951 on an initiative from the then Austrian minister of education Felix Hurdes. It replaced the old "Regeln für die deutsche Rechtschreibung nebst Wörterbuch", a standard work for the German orthography that dated back to pre-World War I times (1879 and 1902), although during Austria's Nazi years 1938-1945, the German Duden works were "gleichgeschaltet", i.e. supplanted the 1902 Austrian rulebook. The first edition, under chief editor Albert Krassnigg, had 276 pages and around 20,000 entries and was designed for use in the Austrian educational system and is today considered, after decades of intense criticism by academic Germanists, a "courageous sociolinguistic-political project."

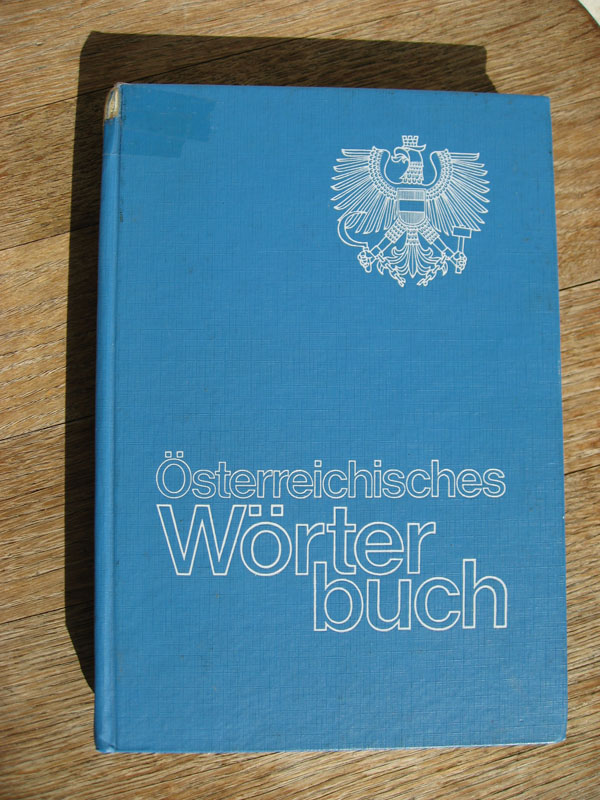
The school version of the 36th edition from 1985

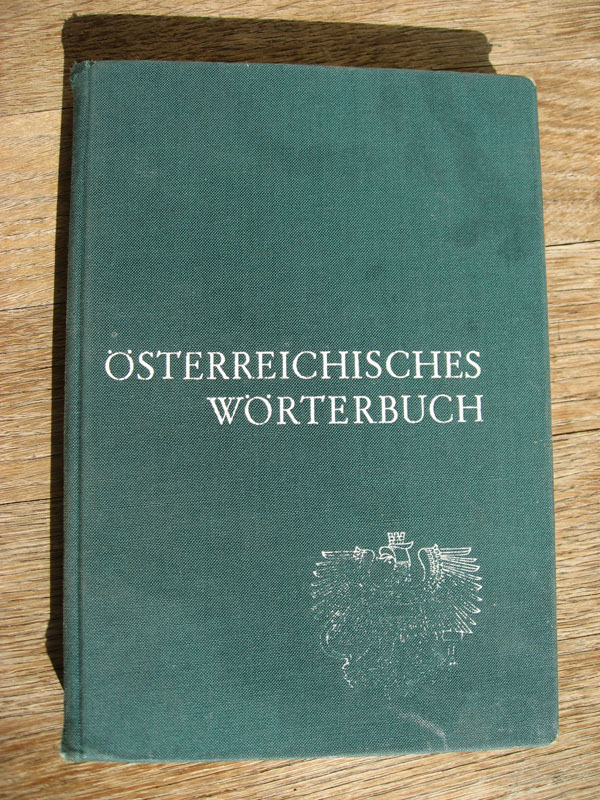
The school version of the 32nd edition from 1972

The Austrian dictionary hence defined the Austrian form of Standard German, making it official and obligatory for use in schools and in public administration. For private persons, the business correspondence of companies, publishing houses and newspapers it remained an orthographic recommendation.

Since then ÖWB was republished and expanded regularly, first under Krassnigg, from the mid-1959s until 1975 under the editorship of Otto Langbein, who was followed by Ernst Pacolt. As of the 1980s, three different versions have been available: a reduced version for primary schools (Volksschule), a medium sized version for high schools (Hauptschule, Gymnasium) and a full version for the general public. The 35th edition from 1979 was considerably expanded in the listed vocabulary and with the 39th edition from 2001 the reformed German orthography was adopted. This new standardized orthography, that was determined by an international group of experts from Germany, Switzerland and Austria, led to considerable debates and refusal in Austria. Most newspapers switched to the reformed orthography but some later revoked their decisions and now use either the old version or a separate in-house orthography (Hausrechtschreibung).

The Austrian dictionary remained with the reformed orthography, only at terms that are differently pronounced in Austria, the orthography differs from the German standard. Nevertheless the ÖWB still includes a considerable amount of unique vocabulary, that was even expanded in the newest 40th edition.

== Characteristics ==
The full version of the 2006 40th edition contains around 80,000 terms on 1,008 pages. The school version is 864 pages, and the small version has 20,000 terms. The authors of this edition were the linguists Otto Back, Erich Benedikt, Karl Blüml, Jakob Ebner and Hermann Möcker from the Institute of Austrian Studies (Institut für Österreichkunde), as well as the dialectologists Maria Hornung, professor Heinz Dieter Pohl from the University of Klagenfurt and emeritus professor Herbert Tatzreiter from the University of Vienna.

About 3,000 new terms were added to the 39th edition, among them Austrian neologisms such as "E-Card" for the Austrian social security card, "Hacklerregelung", a legal term for a special retirement law, and "Pensionsharmonisierung". From the colloquial vocabulary new terms were added such as "Altenbetreuer" (geriatric nurse), "anzipfen" (to get fed up), "ablösefrei" (without transfer fee), „Audiobook“, „Afro-Look“ und „Alkopops“ (soft drink with liquor). New technological terms were also added, like: "skypen", "VoIP", "Blog", "Linux" and even "Wikipedia".

New terms might differ from their counterparts in Germany. The Austrian dictionary now sets the term "smsen" (to text message, pronounced as-am-as-an) as standard, whereas the Duden uses "simsen", both derived from the English abbreviation "SMS" for "short message service".

Numerous outdated words were removed from the 40th edition, either because their reference in the real world ceased to exist or because they became out of fashion. Examples are "Absperrkommando", "affengeil" und "Arbeitermittelschule". However, the terms "Schilling" and "Gendarmerie" are listed, although their signifiants no longer exist. Still included are some typical dialect terms, that continue to be used in the written language, such as the Carinthian "Strankerl" (common beans) or the word "Zöger" or "Zeger" for a wicker basket.

Other typically Austrian words in the dictionary are for example: "Dulliähstimmung" (drunkenness), "Greißler" (grocery shop), "Gwirkst" (complicated situation), "Jausengegner" (easy opponent in sports), "Käsekrainer" (a cheese-filled Carniolan sausage), "klass" (terrific), "Outwachler" (a linesman), "Pfusch" (unreported employment), "pipifein" (fine), "Roadpricing", "Stockerlplatz" (a medal rank in sports), "Szenebeisl" (a hip nightclub), "tschechern" (to booze), "zach" (chewy, tough) and "zerknautschen" (to crumple).

Some parents protested against the 39th edition, arguing that there were too many "dirty words" listed, some of which have subsequently been removed from the school version of the 40th edition.

== Language policy ==
The objective of the Austrian dictionary has never been to do classical language planning, but to do a re-codification of the form of the German language used in Austria. New terms were only included to the dictionary, when they had already been in considerable use in newspapers and contemporary literature.

Although the dictionary was originally designed to promote Austrianisms and language patriotism, throughout the years the dictionary commission followed a moderate policy of contrastive linguistics and tried to avoid language secessionism. Nevertheless in the case of conflicting definitions the Austrian dictionary overrules the Duden and remains the sole source for defining the Austrian standard. In post-World War II Austria the German Duden never had any legal authority, although informally it is also widely in use as a work of reference. The ÖWB has codified a Standard Austrian German and has thus challenged what some linguists consider a One Standard German Axiom. In academic research ÖWB plays, to this date, very little role and receives no academic research support.

== See also ==
- Austrian German
- Austro-Bavarian
- Deutsches Wörterbuch
- List of German dictionaries

== Literature ==
- Österreichisches Wörterbuch – auf der Grundlage des amtlichen Regelwerks (neue Rechtschreibung); herausgegeben im Auftrag des Bundesministeriums für Bildung, Wissenschaft und Kultur; Bearb.: Otto Back et al., Redaktion: Herbert Fussy et al., 40. neu bearb. Aufl., Wien: öbv&hpt, 2006, 1008 S., ISBN 978-3-209-05511-8 (full version)
- Österreichisches Wörterbuch – auf der Grundlage des amtlichen Regelwerks (neue Rechtschreibung); herausgegeben im Auftrag des Bundesministeriums für Bildung, Wissenschaft und Kultur; Bearb.: Otto Back et al., Redaktion: Herbert Fussy et al., 40. neu bearb. Aufl., Wien: öbv&hpt, 2006, 864 S., ISBN 978-3-209-05068-7 (school edition)
- Österreichisches Wörterbuch – auf der Grundlage des amtlichen Regelwerks (neue Rechtschreibung); Ebner, Jakob, u. a., 40. neu bearb. Aufl., Wien: öbv&hpt, 2006, ISBN 978-3-209-04863-9 (small version)

=== Further reading ===
- Gregor Retti (1999): Austriazismen in Wörterbüchern. Zum Binnen- und Außenkodex des österreichischen Deutsch. phil. Diss. Innsbruck.
- Gregor Retti (1991): Das Österreichische Wörterbuch. Entwicklung, Wortbestand, Markierungssysteme. Dipl.-Arb. Innsbruck.
- Rudolf Muhr: Österreichisches Aussprachewörterbuch, österreichische Aussprachedatenbank (Adaba); inkl. CD mit 75.964 Audiofiles; Frankfurt am Main; Wien (u.a.): Lang, 2007, 524 S., ISBN 978-3-631-55414-2
