= Austrian German =

Variety of Standard German

Austrian German (Austrian)
- Austrian Standard German; Austrian High German
- Österreichisches Standarddeutsch; Österreichisches Hochdeutsch
- Pronunciation: [ˈøːstɐraɪçɪʃəs ˈʃtandardˌdɔʏtʃ, - ˈstan-] [ˈøːstɐraɪçɪʃəs ˈhoːxdɔʏtʃ]
- Region: Austria
- Ethnicity: Austrians
- Language family: Indo-European: Germanic; West Germanic; High German; Standard German; Austrian German (Austrian)

Official status
- Official language in: Austria
- Recognised minority language in: Hungary; Italy; Slovenia

Language codes
- ISO 639-3: –
- Glottolog: None
- IETF: de-AT
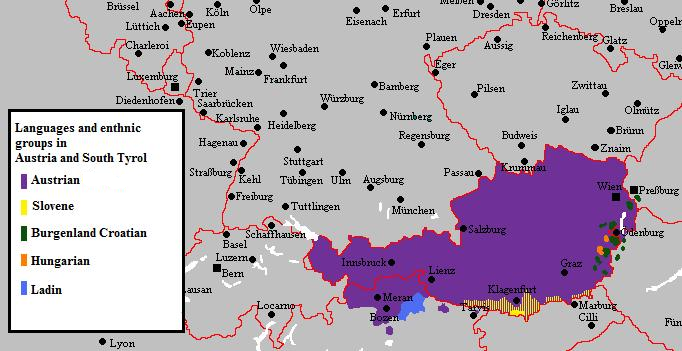

Austrian German (German: Österreichisches Deutsch), Austrian Standard German (ASG), Standard Austrian German (Österreichisches Standarddeutsch), Austrian High German (Österreichisches Hochdeutsch), or simply just Austrian (Österreichisch), is the variety of Standard German written and spoken in Austria and South Tyrol. It has the highest sociolinguistic prestige locally, as it is the variation used in the media and for other formal situations. In less formal situations, Austrians use Bavarian and Alemannic dialects, which are traditionally spoken but rarely written in Austria. It has been standardized with the publishing of the Österreichisches Wörterbuch in 1951.

== History ==
Austrian German has its beginning in the mid-18th century, when Empress Maria Theresa and her son Joseph II introduced compulsory schooling in 1774, and several reforms of administration in their multilingual Habsburg Empire. At the time, the written standard was Oberdeutsche Schreibsprache (Upper German written language), which was highly influenced by the Bavarian and Alemannic dialects of Austria. Another option was to create a new standard based on the Southern German dialects, as proposed by the linguist Johann Siegmund Popowitsch. Instead they decided for pragmatic reasons to adopt the already-standardized chancellery language of Saxony (Sächsische Kanzleisprache or Meißner Kanzleideutsch), which was based on the administrative language of the non-Austrian area of Meißen and Dresden. Austria High German (Hochdeutsch in Österreich, not to be confused with the Bavarian Austria German dialects) has the same geographic origin as the Swiss High German (Schweizer Hochdeutsch, not to be confused with the Alemannic Swiss German dialects).

The process of introducing the new written standard was led by Joseph von Sonnenfels.

Since 1951, the standardized form of Austrian German for official governmental use and in schools has been defined by the Österreichisches Wörterbuch ("Austrian Dictionary"), published originally at the behest of the Austrian Federal Ministry of Education, Arts and Culture (in the 1950s the "Unterrichtsministerium", under minister Felix Hurdes) with Verlag Jugend & Volk, then by the Österreichischer Bundesverlag.

== Standard Austrian German ==
The German language is a pluricentric language and Austrian German is one of its standardized forms. The official Austrian dictionary, Österreichisches Wörterbuch, prescribes spelling rules that define the official language.

Austrian delegates participated in the international working group that drafted the German spelling reform of 1996, and several conferences leading up to the reform were hosted in Vienna at the invitation of the Austrian federal government. Austria adopted it as a signatory, along with Germany, Switzerland, and Liechtenstein, of an international memorandum of understanding (Wiener Absichtserklärung) signed in Vienna in 1996.

The eszett (ß) is used in Austria and Germany but not in Switzerland. In Austria, it is usually only called "scharfes S" ("sharp s").

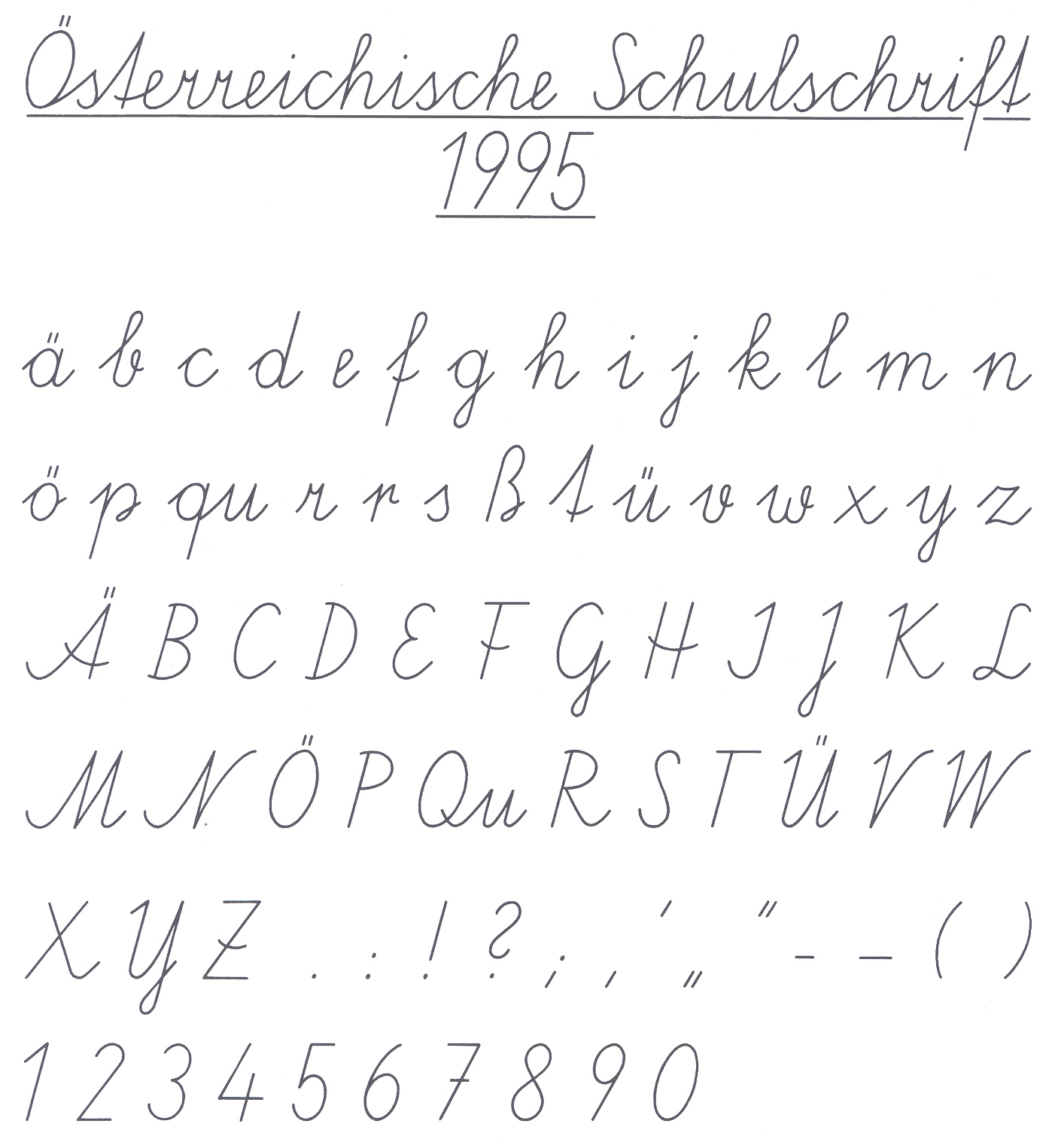
Schulschrift (1995), an Austrian primary-school handwriting style

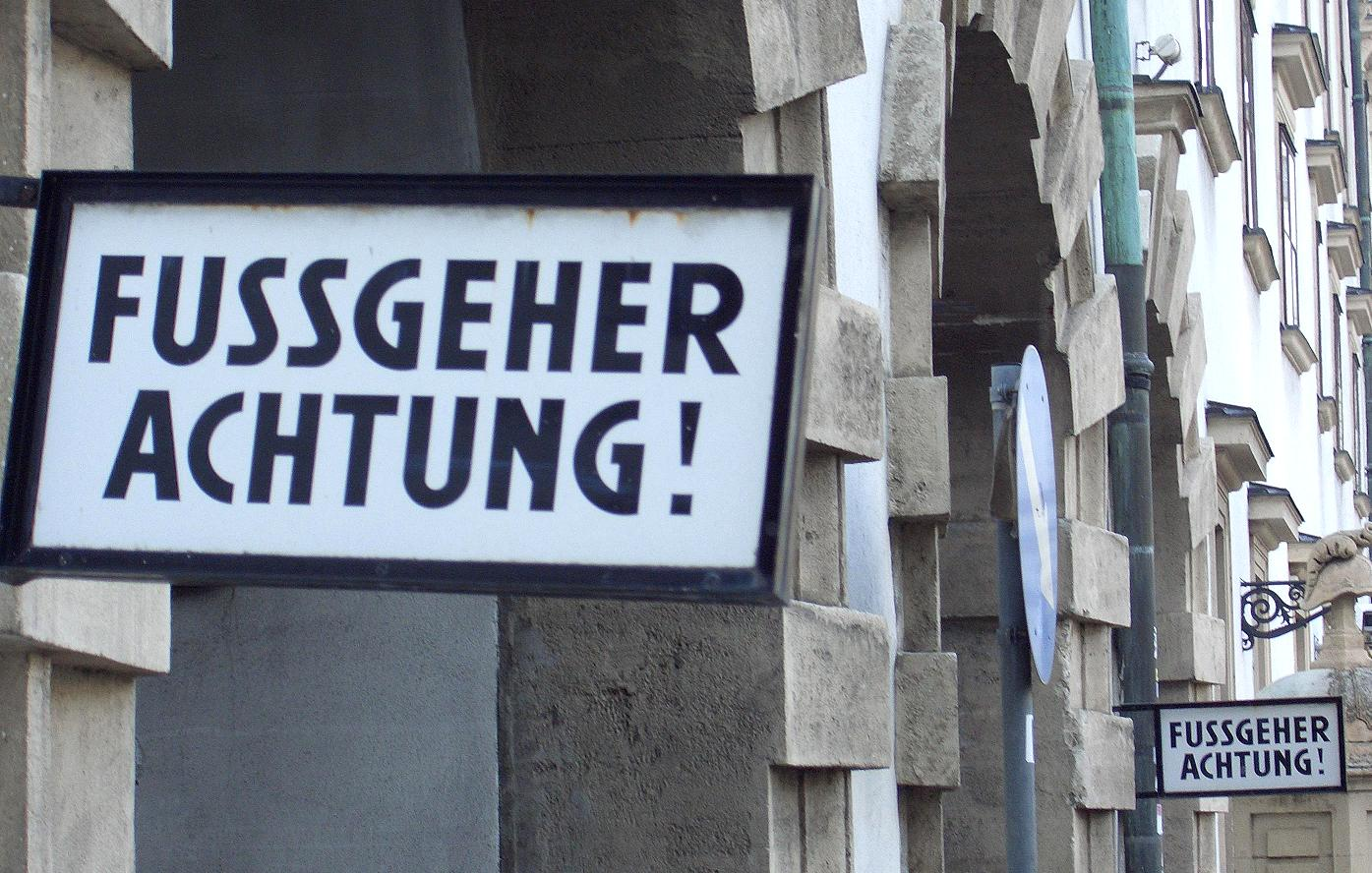
A sign in Vienna: Fußgeher ("pedestrian") is Fußgänger in Germany. In all-caps words, capital ẞ (instead of SS) became standard in both nations in 2017, but SS remains valid.

Distinctions in vocabulary persist, for example, in culinary terms, for which communication with Germans is frequently difficult, and administrative and legal language because of Austria's exclusion from the development of a German nation-state in the late 19th century and its manifold particular traditions. A comprehensive collection of Austrian-German legal, administrative and economic terms is offered in Markhardt, Heidemarie: Wörterbuch der österreichischen Rechts-, Wirtschafts- und Verwaltungsterminologie (Peter Lang, 2006).

Because of German's pluricentric nature, German dialects in Austria should not be confused with the variety of Standard Austrian German spoken by most Austrians, which is distinct from that of Germany or Switzerland. In the field of German dialectology, the notion of Standard Austrian German has been both debated and defended by German linguists since the 1970s. A One Standard German Axiom, effectively preventing the development of newer standards of German, has recently been offered as a characteristic of the field but remains to be discussed discipline-internally.

=== Former spoken standard ===
Until 1918, the spoken standard in Austria was the Schönbrunner Deutsch, a sociolect spoken by the imperial Habsburg family and the nobility of Austria-Hungary. The sociolect, a variety of Standard German, is influenced by Viennese German and other Austro-Bavarian dialects spoken in eastern Austria but is slightly nasalized. (Note: Some examples of Schönbrunner Deutsch: Otto von Habsburg (2004), former crown prince: Quo vadis Integration lecture; Emperor Charles I of Austria (1916–1918): Recording (1.5 min); Emperor Franz Joseph (1848–1916): Speech for a military fund (30 sec))

=== Special written forms ===
For many years, Austria had a special form of the language for official government documents that is known as Österreichische Kanzleisprache, or "Austrian chancellery language". It is a very traditional form of the language, probably derived from medieval deeds and documents, and has a very complex structure and vocabulary generally reserved for such documents. For most speakers (even native speakers), this form of the language is generally difficult to understand, as it contains many highly specialised terms for diplomatic, internal, official, and military matters. There are no regional variations because the special written form has been used mainly by a government that has now, for centuries, been based in Vienna.

Österreichische Kanzleisprache is now used less and less because of various administrative reforms that reduced the number of traditional civil servants (Beamte). As a result, Standard Austrian German is replacing it in government and administrative texts.

=== European Union ===
When Austria became a member of the European Union on 1 January 1995, 23 food-related terms were listed in its accession agreement as having the same legal status as the equivalent terms used in Germany, for example, the words for "potato", "tomato", and "Brussels sprouts". (Note: The 23 food terms of Protokoll Nr. 10 is quoted in this article:) (Examples in "Vocabulary") Austrian German is the only variety of a pluricentric language recognized under international law or EU primary law. The focus on food-related vocabulary in "Protocol 23" is owed to trade requirements and therefore utterly accidental.

=== Grammar ===
==== Verbs ====
In Austria, as in the German-speaking parts of Switzerland and in southern Germany, verbs that express a state tend to use sein as the auxiliary verb in the perfect, as well as verbs of movement. Verbs which fall into this category include sitzen (to sit), liegen (to lie) and, in parts of Styria and Carinthia, schlafen (to sleep). Therefore, the perfect of these verbs would be ich bin gesessen, ich bin gelegen and ich bin geschlafen, respectively.

In Germany, the words stehen (to stand) and gestehen (to confess) are identical in the present perfect: habe gestanden. The Austrian variant avoids that potential ambiguity (bin gestanden from stehen, "to stand"; and habe gestanden from gestehen, "to confess": "der Verbrecher ist vor dem Richter gestanden und hat gestanden").

In addition, the preterite (simple past) is very rarely used in Austria, especially in the spoken language, with the exception of some modal verbs (ich sollte, ich wollte).

=== Vocabulary ===
There are many official terms that differ in Austrian German from their usage in most parts of Germany. Words used in Austria are Jänner (January) rather than Januar, Feber (more rare than Jänner) in variation with Februar, heuer (this year) along with dieses Jahr, Stiege (stairs) along with Treppen, Rauchfang (chimney) instead of Schornstein, many administrative, legal and political terms, and many food terms, including the following:

Austrian Standard German	Standard German	English
Brandteigkrapferl	Windbeutel	Cream puff
Eierspeise	Rühreier	Scrambled eggs
Erdapfel (also Bavarian and Southern German)	Kartoffel	Potato
Faschiertes	Hackfleisch	Minced meat/Ground beef
Fisolen	Gartenbohnen or Grüne Bohnen	Common beans/green beans
Karfiol (also Bavarian and Southern German)	Blumenkohl	Cauliflower
Kohlsprossen	Rosenkohl	Brussel sprouts
Kren (also Bavarian and Southern German)	Meerrettich	Horseradish
Kukuruz (southeastern and western Austria)	Mais	Maize/corn
Marille	Aprikose	Apricot
Melange	Milchkaffee	Milk heavy coffee drink
Melanzani	Aubergine	Aubergine/eggplant
Palatschinke	Pfannkuchen	Pancake
Paradeiser (Vienna, Eastern Austria)	Tomate	Tomato
Pfefferoni	Peperoni or Chili	Chili pepper
Rote Rübe	Rote Bete	Beetroot
Sauce Tartare	Remoulade	Tartar Sauce
Schlagobers	Schlagsahne	Whipped cream
Stanitzel	Eiswaffel	Ice cream cone
Staubzucker	Puderzucker	Icing sugar/powdered sugar
Topfen (also Bavarian)	Quark	Quark, a semi-sweet cottage cheese
Weckerl (also Bavarian)	Brötchen	Roll (bread)

There are, however, some false friends between the two regional varieties:

- Kasten (wardrobe) along with or instead of Schrank as opposed to Kiste (box) instead of Kasten. Kiste in Germany means both "box" and "chest". Similarly, Eiskasten along with Kühlschrank (refrigerator).
- Sessel (chair) instead of Stuhl. Sessel means "easy chair" in Germany and Stuhl means "stool (faeces)" in both varieties.

== Dialects ==
=== Classification ===
- Dialects of the Austro-Bavarian group, which also comprises dialects from Bavaria
  - Central Austro-Bavarian (along the main rivers Isar and Danube, spoken in the northern parts of the State of Salzburg, Upper Austria, Lower Austria, and northern Burgenland)
    - Viennese German
  - Southern Austro-Bavarian (in Tyrol, South Tyrol, Carinthia, Styria, and the southern parts of Salzburg and Burgenland)
- Vorarlbergerisch, spoken in Vorarlberg, is a High Alemannic dialect.

=== Regional accents ===
In addition to the standard variety, in everyday life most Austrians speak one of a number of Upper German dialects.

While strong forms of the various dialects are not fully mutually intelligible to northern Germans, communication is much easier in Bavaria, especially rural areas, where the Bavarian dialect still predominates as the mother tongue. The Central Austro-Bavarian dialects are more intelligible to speakers of Standard German than the Southern Austro-Bavarian dialects of Tyrol.

Viennese, the Austro-Bavarian dialect of Vienna, is seen by many in Germany as quintessentially Austrian. The people of Graz, the capital of Styria, speak yet another dialect which is not very Styrian and more easily understood by people from other parts of Austria than other Styrian dialects, for example, from western Styria.

Simple words in the various dialects are very similar, but pronunciation is distinct for each and, after listening to a few spoken words, it may be possible for an Austrian to realise which dialect is being spoken. However, in regard to the dialects of the deeper valleys of the Tyrol, other Tyroleans are often unable to understand them. Speakers from the different provinces of Austria can easily be distinguished from each other by their particular accents (probably more so than Bavarians), those of Carinthia, Styria, Vienna, Upper Austria, and the Tyrol being very characteristic. Speakers from those regions, even those speaking Standard German, can usually be easily identified by their accent, even by an untrained listener.

Several of the dialects have been influenced by contact with non-Germanic linguistic groups, such as the dialect of Carinthia, where, in the past, many speakers were bilingual (and, in the southeastern portions of the state, many still are even today) with Slovene, and the dialect of Vienna, which has been influenced by immigration during the Austro-Hungarian period, particularly from what is today the Czech Republic. The German dialects of South Tyrol have been influenced by local Romance languages, particularly noticeable with the many loanwords from Italian and Ladin.

The geographic borderlines between the different accents (isoglosses) coincide strongly with the borders of the states and also with the border with Bavaria, with Bavarians having a markedly different rhythm of speech in spite of the linguistic similarities.
