= History of the Polish language =

The Polish language is a West Slavic language, and thus descends from Proto-Slavic, and more distantly from Proto-Indo-European; more specifically, it is a member of the Lechitic branch of the West Slavic languages, along with other languages spoken in areas within or close to the area of modern Poland: including Kashubian, Silesian, and the extinct Slovincian and Polabian.

The separation of Polish as a language is conventionally dated at the second half of the 10th century, linked with the establishment of Polish statehood and the Christianization of Poland. The history of the language can then be divided into the following periods of development: Old Polish (staropolski) with a pre-literate, pre-Polish era up to 1136, the literate era from 1136 with the Bull of Gniezno up to the start of the 16th century; Middle Polish (średniopolski) from the 16th century until the end of the 18th century (1772) with the first partition of the Polish–Lithuanian Commonwealth; New Polish (nowopolski) from 1772 to 1939; and Modern Polish, since World War II.

== General changes in West Slavic and Lechitic from Proto-Slavic ==
Proto-Slavic broke into three dialectal regions, Western Proto-Slavic, Eastern Proto-Slavic, and Southern Proto-Slavic.

Within declension, in North Slavic, the nominative-accusative feminine plural ending of *-ja stems leveled from *-ě (< PIE *-’ās) in the nominative plural and *-ę (<*-’åns < PIE *-’ans) in the accusative to *-ě for both cases: *dȗšę̇ > Old Polish dusze. The leveling of these cases for -ja stems was motivated by the fact that -a stems had the same ending -y for both cases. This also affected the accusative plural of soft-stem masculine nouns (e.g. *koňь, *mǫžь), which was motivated by the homophonous ending -y for feminine and masculine hard-stems.

Within West-Slavic, *ś shifted to *š: *vьśь gives Old Polish wiesz. The clusters *tl dl are retained in West Slavic, and elsewhere simplify to *l: *ordlo gives Old Polish radło. In initial *or-, ol-, as a result of the law of open syllables, metathesis occurs, which usually resulted in the lengthening of *o to *a, giving ra- la-. This occurred in all situations in South Slavic, but in North Slavic only in syllables with an acute, but those with a circumflex, *o remained as *o: *ordlo gives Old Polish radło. In addition, there was a tendency to raise mid and low long vowels: Old Polish pták, mléko, grzéch, wóz. There existed a western tendency to fix stress, except in Pomeranian and Polabian. The pronoun of *tъnъ was created in all of Western Slavic. Finally, the genitive and dative forms of the complex adjectival declension establishes for the masculine and neuter gender the endings resulting from the contraction of the endings -ego, -emu. This is in contrast with East and South Slavic *-ogo, -omu.

Within most of Lechitic, the clusters *TorT *TolT *TerT *TelT undergo metathesis: *vȏrgъ gives Old Polish wróg, *mȏldъ gives Old Polish młody, *dȇrvo gives Old Polish drzewo, *melkò gives Old Polish mléko (with a long e). Notably, both -ro- and -ar- between consonants for TorT are present in Polabian and Pomeranian, compare reflexes of Kashubian karwa and Polabian korvo. *ť ď change to c dz: *svěťa > Old Polish świéca, *meďa > Old Polish miedza, *noťь > Old Polish noc (świeca, miedza, noc). The nasal vowels are well retained in Lechitic, in contrast to the rest of West Slavic: *pę̑tь > Old Polish pięć, *pętъ > Old Polish piąty. Combinations of *ъr ъl ьr, ьl volcalize in various ways in Lechitic and Sorbian, but become vocalic liquids in Czech and Slovak.

Common to Lechitic is the Lechitic umlaut, albeit to varying degrees of intensity regionally: the front vowels *e *ě *ę as well as soft *ьr, ьl into two variants:

1. dispalatalization (dyspalatalizacja) whereby the vowel is fronted and lowered: *a *ǫ *ъr *ъl (later > ar eł) before the dental/alveolar hard consonants t, d, n, s, z, r, ł;
  *bě̃lъ > Old Polish biáły
  *lěto > lato
  *berǫ > biorę
  *nesǫ > niosę
  *květъ > kwiat
  *lěsъ > las
  *zelo > zioło
  *žena > żona
  *měra > miara
  *město > miasto
2. a front variant *e ę ьr, ьl (> ir il) before other consonants and word-finally
  *běliti > Old Polish bielić
  *vъ lětě > Old Polish w lecie.

The alternation equating to Polish eł:il is absent in Polabian due to a merging of *ьl and *ъl into just oł; this process is probably older than the vocalization of liquids (see § Proto-Slavic yers *ъr *ъl *ьr *ьl (*TъrT *TъlT *TьrT *TьlT)), since the merging of soft *ьr, ьl with hard *ъr ъl must have happened before vocalization. The source of the Lechitic umlaut likely came from Eastern Lechitic dialects, which later spread to the rest of Lechitic as the later e > o change is absent from Polabian, which is Western; compare żona, żenić miotła, siodło, and Polabian zéna, métla, sedlǘ.

The distribution of nasal vowels in Polish was affected due to later sound developments. See also § Proto-Slavic *e for the articulatory-acoustic motivations for the umlaut.

The Lechitic umlaut likely took place in the 9th and 10th centuries and finished by the 12th century. As a result, soft consonants became phonemic, as previously they only occurred before front vowels, but could now occur before back vowels, with minimal pairs like mara and miara. Similarly, the opposition of y and i is called into question, as words that were previously minimal pairs, e.g. być and bić could now be understood to differ phonemically in the softness of the consonant. Finally, the umlaut led to new vowel alternations, e.g. e:o: wieźć:wiozę and e:a: (w) lesie:las.

There are many common morphological and especially lexical developments in addition to these common phonetic developments. This group can be broken into four: the westernmost Obotrites and Drevani, the neighboring Veleti, the Pomeranians, including part of Western Pomerania, whereas Eastern Pomeranian (Slovincian-Kashubian) eventually later came under the influence of the rest of Lechitic), and the Polish tribes, which had much closer contact both socio-politically and linguistically as a result of the Polans, and the creation of Literary Polish.

=== Beginnings of the Polish language and its relation to Pomeranian ===
The earliest attested names from the Middle Ages come mostly from the west, including the Silesian Dadosesani, Bobrans, Silesians, Opolans, Golensizi, and others, the Greater Polish Polans, Kuyavians; from the east only the Vistulans and Masovians (Masurians) are mentioned. Both the Vistulans and Masovians probably had other smaller associated tribes, records of which have been lost. Based on similarities between the dialects of these tribes, it is possible to surmise that Standard Polish was formed based on the closely related dialects of the Polans, Silesians, and Vistulans, and the Masovians had a weaker connection, and the weakest was the input from the eastern Pomeranians (Kashubians), as they were drawn into the sphere of Polish influence later.

These similarities between the Polans, Vistulans, and Silesians include:

1. *ьl > -eł- before front hard consonants (wełna, pełny, zmełty) and -il- before others (wilga, wilk, pilśń), whereas in Masovian and Kashubian -’oł- appears after hard consonants and -’áł- after a soft consonant: wiołna, miołty, Old Kashubian wiáłna, piálny (piáln-i);
2. Greater Polish and Lesser Polish show voice final consonants appearing before a word beginning with anything but a voiceless consonant (udźwięcznienie międzywyrazowe), e.g. kod idzie (kot idzie), bog równy (bok równy), brad niesie (brat niesie), zanióz em (zaniósłem), zmóg em (zmógłem), and Masovian shows devoicing, e.g. kot idzie, bok równy, brat niesie, zaniós em.

Traits that are younger include:

1. Mazuration (mazurzenie), which took place in Masovia, Lesser Poland, and part of Silesia, but not Greater Poland or Pomerania.
2. The realization of nasal vowels; in Greater Poland they undergo decomposition (bende = będę, kont = kąt, zemby = zęby, zomb = ząb, reŋka = ręka, roŋk = rąk), whereas in Lesser Poland and Masovia nasality was often lost, i.e. in Central Lesser Poland geba, reka, zob.

Kashubian shows more differences that connect it with its western neighbors, namely:

1. A uniform change of hard *ъl and soft *ьl to -oł- (pôłny, wôłk). Compare the Masovian change of -’áł- < *ьl before front hard consonants like wiáłna, piálny (see above);
2. A softening of consonants before -ar- from soft *ьr (miartwi), cwiardi (Polish twardy); also compare Masovian siarna.

These traits, due to their chronology, show that Pomeranian was more divergent than Masovian and show that Pomerania was a transitional area between the rest of Lechitic and Western Lechitic. However, since Pomerania eventually fell under the influence of the rest of Lechitic, albeit later than Masovia, it underwent some common changes.

1. Development of the slanted (pochylone) vowels in contrast to clear (jasne) ones and their alternations - something not seen in Polabian, seen even moreso in Pomeranian with the present of slanted high vowels;
2. A change of soft alveolar/dental plosive *t d to palatal affricates ć dź and soft *s z to the palatal sibilants s ź, which in Pomeranian later underwent Kashubation (kaszubienie). However, the change to affricates/sibilants took place in Poland in the 12th century, and this is also what separated Pomeranian from the rest of Western Pomerania (the Veleti).

== Phonetics ==
Below are sound changes and their motivations with examples from Proto-Slavic throughout the course of history of the Polish language.

=== Prosody ===
Historic Polish lost the Proto-Slavic accent system, modified its stress system, and gradual lost its length distinctions (see § Vowel length). Slovincian displays the most archaic state of the Lechitic stress system; Polabian in theory does as well, but due to incomplete material it is difficult to use. See Slovincian grammar for information on the stress system.

The timeline of stress can be divided into three periods:

1. A change of Proto-Slavic free and mobile stress by moving the stress forward or backward due to phonetic and morphological factors, kept in Slovincian and some of Kashubian;
2. A change to initial stress, seen in North-Kashubian, many Goral dialects, and in the Southern Silesian dialects found on the border of Poland and Czechia;
3. A change to penultimate stress, originally secondary, which gained more emphasis, present throughout the rest of the North-East Lechitic region.

During the preliterate (10th-11th centuries) era Polish likely still had free and mobile stress (akcent dynamiczny i ruchomy), then in the 12th-14th century, the accent was still at least mobile, seen in the second and third person singular imperative of verbs formed with the ending -i, e.g. usłysz (Bogurodzica), słysz (Bogurodzica), napełń (Bogurodzica) but zyszczy (Bogurodzica), spuści (Bogurodzica), raczy (Bogurodzica), wstań (Holy Cross Sermons) and pojdz (Holy Cross Sermons), chwali (Sankt Florian Psalter), puści (Sankt Florian Psalter), which could be stressed, and when it was stressed it was kept, but when the ending was not accented it was lost (however notably no imperative forms with -i are kept in Slovincian). Next initial accent was established in the 14th-15th century (compare Northern Kashubian dialects and some Goral dialects like Podhale, where initial accent here is considered a preserved archaic feature), this is also evinced in the loss of medial -i- in words like wielki < wieliki, wszelki < wszeliki. Finally penultimate stress developed as early as the 15th century or at the beginning of the 18th century. It is uncertain whether penultimate stress formed earlier in most dialects, or if it spread unevenly; it is more likely that it spread unevenly.

The development of the initial stress system and the penultimate stress system are likely related in that penultimate stress is likely derived from initial stress, namely, a secondary stress on the penultimate syllable could be found alongside the primary stress on the initial syllable of multi-syllable words, whereas penultimate systems, such as in modern Polish or eastern Slovak often have the secondary stress on the first syllable; this secondary accent become stronger in border regions where the two systems meet. These facts show that initial stress developed first and that the secondary penultimate stress later began regionally to be pronounced stronger.

Penultimate stress is not entirely regular in Modern Polish due to loanwords with the proparoxytonic stress (on the third to last syllable) from Greek and Latin such as muzyka, logika, polityka, as well as calques such as Rzeczpospolita (< Latin Rēspūblica), however colloquially many of these have penultimate stress; furthermore many French loanwards have word-final stress. Penultimate stress was also not established in native constructions with clitics such as clitiic pronouns; historically and regionally they in fact shifted stress, e.g. Old Polish dało się but dało, zobaczył go but zobaczył; this continued in the 19th century; and finally compounds originally composed of two accentual units, namely compound past tense forms: chodziliśmy, subjunctive forms: musielibyśmy, compound numerals: osiemset, and compound nouns like graniastosłup; also compare 19th century Kazimierz, Władysław, cudotwór, however in modern Polish there is a strong tendency to fix penultimate stress in these compounds.

=== Vowels ===
The vocalic system of early Proto-Slavic was mostly retained from Proto-Balto-Slavic times, except for the merger of long *ā and *ō vowels (which are kept separate in Baltic) and several quality changes conditioned by surrounding consonants. Proto-Slavic also kept mobile pitch accent. During the Common Slavic stage, around the 9th century, when Proto-Slavic dialects started developing individual features separating into more clearly differentiated languages, a larger reorganization of vowel qualities happened.

==== Vowel length and clear vs slanted vowels ====
Early Proto-Slavic length distinction developed into a system of distinct vowel qualities:

- short vowels: *a, *e, *i, *u resulted in Common Slavic *o, *e, *ь, *ъ,
- long vowels: *ā, *ē, *ī, *ū resulted in *a, *ě, *i, *y,
- several diphthongs also monophthongized into long vowels: *ā̆u/ē̆u, ā̆i, ē̆i, ē̆N/ī̆N, ū̆N/ā̆N (where N is any nasal) resulted in *u, *ě, *i, *ę, *ǫ.

This created a system in which vowels with different quantity were also distinguished by quality: ultrashort vowels (*ъ, *ь), short vowels (*e, *o), and long vowels (*a, *ě, *i, *y, *u, *ę, *ǫ). Liquid diphthongs (*or, *er, *ol, *el, *ьr, *ъr, *ьl, *ъl) also behaved like long vowels.

This process happened in multiple stages and some diferences in reflexes of morphological endings between south and north Slavic, as well as between Old Novgorod dialect and the other Slavic languages suggest more complex developments before word-final fricatives.

The originally long vowels (*a, *y, *u, *i, *ę, *ǫ) kept their length for some time (as shown eg. by Hungarian, Finnish, Lithuanian loanwords) but subsequently they were shortened in some contexts creating new length distinctions. Shortening of original long vowels was conditioned by Proto-Slavic accent and happened differently in different Slavic languages. Polish generally kept length of Proto-Slavic long vowels only:

- in pretonic position in disyllabic forms: *mǫkà > mąka, *borzdà > brózda (> bruzda), *svěťà > świéca; except in accent paradigm c nouns, probably due to analogy from forms with circumflex accent: *rǫkà > ręka (instead of **rąka) due to *rǫ̑kǫ > rękę, but long in genitive plural: rǫ̃kъ > rąk,
- and when they bore neoacute accent regardless of position: *pǫ̃tьnikъ > pątnik, *pę̃tъjь > piąty, *stõrža > OPl. stróża.

After that several lengthening processes happened, including compensatory lengthening resulting from the loss of yers (which played a role in the phonemicization of soft consonants and introduced a lot of closed syllables into the language as well), contraction of vowels across j. Other changes happening during that time include Lechitic umlat which introduced new vowel quality alternations, vocalizations of liquid diphthongs in various ways, and changes in nasal vowels.

Compensatory lengthening occurred after the loss of yers due to the reduction of the number of syllables in the word when a vowel occurred in a closed or final syllable, usually before voiced consonants and often liquids, most often seen in vowel alternations caused by the masculine singular -∅ | oblique cases and the feminine genitive plural -∅ | other endings, compare Polish lód||lodu and kłoda||kłód. In Pomeranian, this alternation remains even for high vowels. Originally this lengthening also occurred before nasals, e.g. dóm, kóń, and during the Middle Polish period these forms were used in both the literary standard as well as in dialects, and Słowacki also shows regionalisms like psóm, dóm, poziómek, korónki - this lengthening (later slanting) was removed due to hypercorrection resulting negative associations with dialects and also through analogy to oN clusters arising from the decomposition of nasal vowels like ząb, dąb, kąty (see also § Proto-Slavic *ę and *ǫ). Many theories as to why compensatory lengthening did not take place before voiceless consonants exist.

Per Baudouin de Courtenay, it did initially occur before voiceless consonants, and a lack of slanting before tautosyllabic voiceless consonants arose as the result of analogy due to the fact that stems ending in voiced consonants were more distinct, and possibly as the result of word-final devoicing, as similar pairs of words like rok - róg, bok - bóg, płot - płód would phonetically sound more similar to each other: [rɔk] vs [rɔːk], etc., adding a semantic load to the importance of vowel length. This is supported by Old Polish texts, albeit inconsistently. Long vowels were often marked by doubling the vowel, and this can on occasion be seen before voiced consonants and voiceless consonants, for example Jakub Parkoszowic in ‘’Traktat o ortografii polskiej’’ (1440) suggests writing long vowels doubled, and includes examples of long vowels before both voiced consonants and voiceless, e.g. druug, laas. Dialects also sometimes show slanting before voiceless consonants, e.g. lós, stós, kós, potók. This has further evidence in the fact that compensatory lengthening became widespread in the genitive plural form -∅ of feminine nouns ending in -a, in which slanting became one of the characteristic inflectional features, occurring regardless of the quality of the last consonant of the stem, e.g. noga||nóg, baba||báb (historic or dialectal), cnota||cnót, księga||ksiąg, ręka||rąk, obora||obór. H. Koneczna in 'Księga referatów II MIędzynarodowego Zjazdu Slawistów, 1934, Warsaw further supports this by claiming that Slavic languages show a significant difference in the length of time between voiceless consonants (the longest), voiced consonants (second longest), and semivowels (the shortest), and these differences then affect the length of the preceding consonants inversely, vowels are the shortest before voiced consonants, second shortest before voiced consonants, and longest before semivowels, resulting in vowels phonemically voicing before voiced consonants and semivowels.

The next source of slanting, contraction, consists of merging two vowels separated by -j- into one. There are two periods of contraction, an older, preliterate period and a younger period which shows dialectal differentiation.

Conditions for older contraction include:

1. Nouns formed with *-ьje (see also § Declension of neuter nouns): picié, zbożé, pisanié (genitive piciá, zbożá, pisaniá)
2. Nouns formed with *-ьja (see also § Declension of feminine vocalic nouns): rolá, głębiá, sędziá, braciá, księżá;
3. The instrumental singular ending for nouns ending in *-a (*-ojǫ > -ǭ) (see also § Declension of feminine vocalic nouns): ręką, nogą, duszą, miedzą;
4. The instrumental plural ending for nouns ending in -ь (*-ьjǫ > -ǭ): kością, nocą; (see also § Declension of feminine consonantal nouns): kości, nocy;
5. The genitive plural of nouns ending in *-ь (*-ь̀jь > -ī (-ȳ after hardened consonants) (see also § Declension of feminine consonantal nouns): kości, nocy;
6. Definite adjectival forms (see also § Proto-Slavic definite forms): dobrý, dobrá, dobré, dobrégo, dobréj, dobrému, dobrą;
7. The word pás (later pas), from earlier pojasъ.

Conditions for younger, dialectically conditioned contraction include:

1. Second and third person singular and second person plural present tense verb forms of verbs with the stem -aje, -eje: działász, działá, działámy, działácie, umiész, umié, umiémy, umiécie, dialectically działajesz, działaje, umiejesz, umieje. Compare the third person plural present forms działają, umieją;
2. Infinitive and past forms of verbs such as chwiać, śmiać się, stać, bać się, chwiáć, chwiáł, śmiáć się, śmiáł się, stáć, stáł, báć się, báł się from older/dialectal chwiejać, chwiejał, śmiejać się, śmiejał się, stojać/stojeć, stojał, bojać się/bojeć się, bojał się;
3. In dialectal forms such as pódę, pódziesz, next to pójdę, pójdziesz, from Proto-Slavic *po-jьdą, * po-jьdešь;
4. Possessive pronoun forms: mégo, mému, má (moja), méj, this occurred the latest contracted and non-contracted forms are kept for different stylistic purposes in the literary standard.

There also exist many cases of slanting outside the above conditions, divided into five groups:

1. In terms such as góra, pióro, skóra, wióry, żóraw (later żuraw), który, wióry, wskórać, wynurzyć (< nórzyć), dialectal zdólić. Seemingly from the r, l, but there are also forms such as nora, pora, zmora, kora, ukorzyć, woleć, pozwolić;
2. rózga and dialectal gróza, potentially from the preceding r and following z, but compare also mrozy, drozd;
3. The ordinal numbers szósty, siódmy, ósmy likely arose via analogy to the old long vowel from the neoacute in the numerals czwárty, piąty, dziewiąty;
4. é and ó in the infinitives niéść, wiéźć, wiéść, piéc, móc, bóść are probably analogy to trzéć, wléc, trząść, róść, where lengthening occurred since the vowel is in a pre-stressed syllable (compare Russian трясти, расти);
5. Some feminine nouns ending in -a gaining slanting via association with nouns formed with *-ьja: rolá, żądzá, władzá, tęczá, paszá, acc. wolą, władzą, żądzą, tęczą, paszą.

Finally some words gained slanting and cannot be placed into any category, namely póki, póty, miesiądz, miesiądza, zając, zająca, pieniąz, pieniądza, mosiądz, mosiądzu, etc., and also verbs formed with -nąć, which was always long whether it was stressed or post-stress.

The loss of vowel length at the turn of the 15th and 16th centuries had three causes:

1. An internal factor in that long and short vowels differed from each other also phonetically in quality, shown in Old Polish spellings from the Sankt Florian Psalter like guor (gór), synuov (synów), skutuov (skutków), and this difference in quality weakened the phonemic function of length, and conversely the weakening of length intensified the need for contrastive tensing, which lead to drastic but gradual changes of these vowels unaffected by prosody,
2. An internal factor of the shift from initial stress to penultimate (see § Prosody), three syllable words beginning with zá- (or other long vowels) like zábawa, záloty, kóleczko shortened their vowel after this change as having a stressed vowel after a long vowel caused difficulties;
3. An external factor in the close political-economic contact between the Ruthenians and the Jagiellonians, tied with the weakening of ties with languages with vowel length like Czech or Latin.

The loss of vowel length brought about a new distinction between slanted (samogłoska pochylona) (or tensed (samogłoska ścieśniona)) vowels (á é ó and to an extent ą /ɒ/ /e/ /o/ /ɔ̃/) and clear (samogłoska jasna) vowels (a e o and to an extent ę /a/ /ɛ/ /ɔ/ /ɛ̃/). This tensing, beginning still when length existed, is a compensatory process, as the energy originally given to hold the length of the vowel for longer is now given to tensing the vowel. In Polish, old long í ý ú merge with their short variants, but traces of them can be seen in Kashubian and Slovincian in <ë> alternating with i and u. The further development of slanted vowels is also one of the most important isoglosses between dialects. The resulting vowel system was rather complicated, and most slanted vowels merged with other vowels in dialects as well as in the standard, likely due to having many vowels near each other, resulting in them not sounding distinct enough from one another. See § Proto-Slavic *a, § Slanted é, and § Proto-Slavic *o for the further development of slanted vowels in the standard and dialects. In short, slanted á was lost first and in the standard merged with clear a with traces of this already in the 16th century, as in prints the two aren't always distinguished, and most Borderlands poets, e.g. Mikołaj Sęp Szarzyński, Szymon Szymonowic, and Józef Bartłomiej Zimorowic rhyme the two; Jan Kochanowski does not, meaning that Ruthenian nobility influenced the merger of slanted á with clear a, and slanted á disappears ultimately in the 18th century, slanted é was kept in the general language for longer; the 1891 orthography reform removed it, suggesting its disappearance occurring somewhat earlier; é originally merged with i or y in the 17th century, but clear e was often reintroduced via analogy (e.g. dobrégo becomes dobrego like tego); dialects show much diversity in the development of é, but it is often kept via alternations or as a separate phoneme, and slanted ó remains in opposition with clear o in the 17th century, after which a tendency to raise it occurs, merging it with u; this process finishes in the 19th century, but traces of it in the standard can be seen in the orthography and morphophonological alternations.

The loss of slanted á and é per Bajerowa (O zaniku samogłosek pochylonych. Pokłosie dyskusji, Katowice 1978) had both internal, i.e. systematic and social, as well as external causes. The first factor was the loss of vowel length, as slanting originally accompanied length, and without that support, it lost its ballast; the second factor was the instability, further strengthened by a following liquid l or r, of slanted vowels, being awkward within the morphophonological system and encumbered the standardization of the language. External factors include a growing social tendency for standardization at the turn of the 18th and 19th centuries, including 19th century orthography reforms, and also influences from Latin as well as Borderlands dialects.

The chronology of long and slanted vowels can be broken into five stages:

1. The Old Polish era (10th-15h centuries) where the opposition of long and short vowels took shape and strengthened;
2. The turn of the 15th and 16th centuries, where the opposition of long and short vowels was lost and slanted vowels arise;
3. The first half of the 18th century where slanted á merged with clear a in the general language (see also § Proto-Slavic *a);
4. The 19th century when slanted ó phonetically merges with u (but still morphophonologically alternating with o) (see also § Proto-Slavic *o);
5. The end of the 19th century when slanted é merged with clear e in the general language (see also § Proto-Slavic *e).

==== Proto-Slavic *i ====
The reflex of Proto-Slavic *i is i. Proto-Slavic *i could be long or short, and early Polish likely kept both; compare Pomeranian alternations of i, from old long i, with schwa, from old short i. It could be possible that a difference in quality accompanied the difference in length, but ultimately we see only i in Polish or Pomeranian i | ë,.

An important change from Proto-Slavic *i in Polish is to y after sz, ż, rz, cz, dż, c, dz (szyć, żyć, przy, czyn, owcym wrodzy) as a result of the loss of softness in these consonants (see §consonants below). An exception is the so-called Podhale archaism (archaizm podhalański), whereby i is retained after s z (< s z or sz ż). i can be retained after sz ż in Silesia on the border with Czech, and rzi is kept in Podhale, all of the Beskids, and all of Silesia. In Podhale, this is sometimes spelled with ⟨ý⟩, see Dialects of Polish.

Proto-Slavic *i also shifted to e or é in the clusters:

1. ir (<*ir): sierota < Old Polish sirota < sirota, szeroki < szyroki, umierać < umirać (in the 15th century)
2. ir (<*ьr: cierń < ciryń, dzierżę < dzirżę, śmierć < śmirć, pierwy < pirwy/pirzwy, wierzba < wirzba, wierzch < wirzch, czerń < czyrń, czerw < czyrzw, czerpać < czyrzpać (in the 12th century).

This change begins around the 13th century, and the further time from this point the fewer instances of -ir- there are, as the Holy Cross Sermons only has one instance of -ir-, and in a transitionary period from the 13th-16th century much inconsistency and fluctuation occurs. While the same word could have either -ir- or -er- during the same time frame, generally it had only one form per scribe, i.e. a singular scribe would not use both forms, but instead one. Some transcriptions from the 16th century suggest both clear and slanted e could exist in er, for example Orzechowski has piérwéj as well as sercem. Some northern polish dialects still show this alternation: śmierć, wiercić || ciérpieć, czérwiec. Therefore, perhaps in the Early Middle Polish period ir had two reflexes. One theory is that the periodization matters: if ir > er|ér took place in forms before the loss of length, then er is the result, because the nearest lower vowel to i was e, but if it took place after the loss of length and quality was the remaining factor, the next nearest vowel was é, provided that that long and short vowels also did not differ in quality phonetically. The preceding and proceeding constants also seem to have affected the reflex of ir:in modern standard Polish, er predominates with a few archaic exceptions (supposedly late borrowings) such as kir, zbir, skir, alongside mir and wir; in Middle Polish forms such as kier and wier exist, also Kazimirz, Kaźmirz. Similarly the groups il, il < *il can sometimes give e: sieła, mieły, odmienieli, usielstwo. This began in the 14th century and intensified into the Middle Polish period, but never quite to the same level as ir. Standard Polish does not keep this form, but many dialects do. Compare yl, ył below.

Within inflectional endings there was a tendency to lower high vowels before nasal consonants, resulting in i lowering to e or é, for examples in:

1. The instrumental plural ending -emi or -émi for all genders of pronouns and adjectives, from older -imi. This began in the 14th century and spread in the 17th and 18th centuries: nieścieciemi, wielkiémi. It appears that this change was motivated mostly by phonetic factors, and the predominance of -emi over -imi in the 17th and 18th centuries suggest that this process had more favorable conditions in accented syllables. See also declenion of pronouns in the plural;
2. -ę, -isz verbs in the present first person plural show - emy|-émy next to etymological -imy: myślemy, mówiémy. This was originally rare in the 15th century and became more common in the Middle Polish era, and adopted into Modern Polish, and is also common in dialects. This process was motivated both by analogy to other paradigms and by the tendency to lower high vowels before nasal consonants, as this only happened in the first person present plural, and in no other forms. The fact this change occurs also suggests it happened in a stressed syllable, i.e. penultimate stress was spreading. Forms with the rarer ending -em such as widziem, musiem, could have arisen based on forms such as widziemy, musiemy;
3. The masculine/neuter singular ending of pronouns and adjectives -em spread in place ofearlier -im. This was sporadically seen in the 15th century with a small increase in the 16th century, e.g. z czeskiem, jakiem gładkiem słówkiem. But -im not only remained in the nominative singular but even replaced the locative singular for the same genders and number.

Finally, *i was lost in a few positions, namely:

1. In the infinitive with a change of *-ti > -ci > -ć. Forms with -ci can be seen even in the early Middle Polish period, but exceedingly rarely, generally used for prosodic and rhyming reasons also perhaps under Czech influence, where in the Czech translation of the same text -ti could be seen. It is also possible this i was only orthographically marking the softness of the preceding c in some cases, but was not pronounced. One possible reason why final -i here was lost is the weakness of the morphological-semantic function, i.e. that both the absence of i and the distinctness of the infinitive ending were sufficient in marking the form;
2. In the imperative. Based on early texts it seems that a series of endings were generalized: -i for the second and third person singular, -imy for the first person plural, and -icie for the second person and third person plural, but even in the oldest texts the imperative without -i is also seen. The loss of -i in the imperative was a slow, gradual process, ending differently depending on the verb in different eras. This process is sometimes explained as being motivated by the general loss of asemantic word-final vowels, i.e. those inert in meaning. Compare also dosyci, maci, tamo, tako, jako, teże, juże, nuże, zasie, daleje, bliżeje, więce; the fact these vowels were unstressed would also support their disappearance, furthermore, verbs that did not accent final -i in the imperative lost it. Verbs with that stress, which are compared to other Slavic languages and Pomeranian suggest that it was stressed. Verbs such as chwalić also had a tendency to lose the imperative i to distinguish those forms from the homophonous third person singular chwali. The coexistence of both forms along with the lack of a phonetically motivated reason to have both lead to an immobilization of the stress, which lead to leveling. After the fixing of Polish stress, -i forms were generally lost, motivated also by a lack of a morpho-semantic need. -i was also lost in plural forms by analogy to the singular forms, e.g. niesi : niesimy : niesicie > nieś : nieśmy : nieście, which helped differentiate these forms semantically from the present tense forms.

==== Proto-Slavic *y ====
Proto-Slavic *y gives y and regionally approaches i, but y can sometimes arise in these areas from old é, or diphthongized in some western Greater Polish dialects. y occurs after cz dż sz ż r z c dz instead of i, except in some dialects, see above on the Podhale archaism and Silesian, and y changes to i after k and g, except in some dialects, likely in relation to k and g softening before e (< *ъ). The change of ky gy > ḱi ǵi probably began as early as the Psalter of Puławy and ended in the 16th century, except parts of Masovia. Similar to the change of *ir > er is also *yr > er: siekiera < OPl siekira < *sěkyra, occurring in the 15th-16th centuries. In Southern Lesser Poland y sometimes approaches e.

The clusters yl ył also sporadically change in the Old Polish era, very rarely before that, to el eł: beli, beł, telko. il ił also developed in different ways in dialects, in parts of Silesia and some other places there is no change, some areas have él éł, and others have il ył, and sometimes with a secondary uł, which also affected forms with y resulting from é. Assimilation to ł (as /w/) can occur in different environments: sometimes in a closed syllable ending in ł (chwiułka but biła) or sometimes even when ł begins the next syllable (chwiułka, biuła). This can often be the result of analogy from other past tense forms. Similar to *im, *imi, *ym and *ymi also change to -em, -emi||-émi in pronominal-adjectival endings. *ym > -em is less common and is not retained. However -emi||-émi becomes more popular in the Middle Polish era.

==== Proto-Slavic *e ====
Proto-Slavic *e usually results in e with softening of the previous consonant. Initial *e often undergoes prothesis with j- in loanwords, especially in dialects.

However, in some contexts *e changes to o as already attested in the Bull of Gniezno leaving preceding consonant palatalized. The change can be traced to all Lechitic lects and remained productive even through the 10th century with Latinate borrowings such as Piotr, anjoł. *e > o occurs before synchronically hard coronal consonants, so *ed, *et, *ez, *es, *en, *el, *er > od, ot, oz, os, on, oł, or: niosę, biorę, plotę, żona, cios, zioło, meaning e occurs before soft or historically soft consonants: nesies, pleciesz, żeński, cieśla, bierzesz, zielony. The presence of soft e near hard consonants such as bierny, Siedlewit is due to the fact that the consonant at the time was soft due to a following yer, which later disappeared: *berьnъ or as the result of a further neighboring soft consonant (Siedlewit).

This change is motivated by the formants of the vowels, which can have primary and secondary formants, in that e has secondary formants similar to o. Then, if the primary formant is weakened or entirely removed, only the secondary formant remains, which is closer to the back (low) quality; this primary formant is removed by the palatalization of the preceding consonants caused by *e, as palatalization absorbs some of the articulatory movement of *e, resulting in a change to o, meaning that not only did this change occur after the palatalization of consonants before *e, but was also motivated by it. This is also called dispalatalization of e. However, if a palatal/soft consonant came after e (i.e. s' z' t' d' r' l' > ś ź ć dź rz l), this difference in position did not occur, thus a need for a vowel change was not present.

Many exceptions exist, often motivated by morphological leveling or other similar processes. The inverse also occurs, etymological czosać, śmiotana, krzosać occur in Old Polish, which were later replaced with -e-. Umlaut is absent however in dialectal forms such as bierę, bierą, but also through analogy to forms such as bierzesz, bierze. The differentiation of forms in the o direction was still weak in the 16th century, and only became stronger in the 17th and especially in the 18th centuries. The occurrence of umlaut or lack thereof in clitics, like prepositions, originally dependended on the quality of the consonant in anlaut of the following word (eg. *pŕodъ gorojǫ with umlaut, *pŕedь ŕěkojǫ without it) but eventually non-umlauted forms of clitics won over in all contexts (modern przed górą, przed rzeką).

The umlaut sporadically occurred before dorsal and labial consonants in some words, for example, *velkǫ > *vlekǫ > wlokę (compare Old Church Slavonic влѣкѫ (vlěkǫ). Umlaut is frequently absent after labial consonants in dialects, biedro, mietła, piełun, wiesło, wiesna. It also differs in many examples from the standard, sometimes with an etymological lack of umlaut: siestra, or an unetymological lack: wieska (e from a yer), poziemka (before a labial), or etymological presence: śmiotana.

The change of e (after softened consonants) > o (after hard) in the dative -ewi > -owi, the derivational suffix -ew- > -ow- (Oleszewo > Oleszowo, as well as adjectival and compound noun endings from this) and the rare genitive -ew > -ow is rather the result of leveling and analogy, as the distribution of o is uneven depending on the dialect and morpheme. Lesser Poland loses e in these positions the most, less often in Masovia due to influence from the literary standard, and the least often in Greater Poland. Within Greater Poland -e- can even occur after innovated soft consonants; in some Greater Polish dialects in, yn change to iń, yń, so syn becomes syń, and the dative synowi changes to syniewi. The Łowicz dialect is unique, as sometimes it generalizes e after hard consonants, but also uses o after soft consonants.

==== Proto-Slavic *ě ====
Proto-Slavic *ě had a tendency to raise in children languages, and in most Polish dialects to e. However, this vowel in Lechitic also sometimes sometimes merged with a, resulting in alternation, bielić : biały, kleć : klatka, kwiecie : kwiat, lecie : lato, mierzyć : miara, mieścić : miasto, strzelić : strzała, świeca : światło, wierzyć : wiara. This umlaut is attested as early as Bull of Gniezno: Balouanz (Białowąs), Balouezici (Białowieżycy), Balossa (Białosza) but Belina (Bielina), Quatec (Kwiatek), Soledad (Sulidziad), Stralec (Strzałek). The oldest example is Dadosesani as a Silesian name for the strain Dziadoszanie, written by the Bavarian Geographer. Also here from 1015 is Diadesizi, meaning that this umlaut is prehistoric, affecting also Polabian, and older than *e > ‘o. This umlaut has the same conditions as *e > ‘o: early *ěd, *ět, *ěz, *ěs, *ěn, *ěł, *ěr > ad, at, az, as, an, ał, ar, and *ě > e before soft (or historically soft) consonants. The presence of e < *ě before hard consonants in forms such as wierny, bielmoświetle is explained by the fact that at the time of the change the consonant was soft or by the fact it was under the influence of a yer which was later lost: *věrьnъ, bělьmo, or from influence from a near-by soft consonant, such as świetle, as l is soft. This umlaut has the same motivations as *e > ‘o, but with /a/ being the back equivalent of /æ/, which was likely the realization of *ě.

As with the umlaut of *e, exceptions exist, and are also the result of morphological leveling, occurring as early as the Old Polish era. These forms are rare and rzezać, lezę, krzesło dominate. Dialectically oferia and powiedać are used. The term ofiera was originally from Czech, but the form ofiara came to dominate based on native terms, powiedać however is purely a Masovian dialectalism, where umlaut often does not occur after labials: niewiesta, kwiet, wieno, piestun. The process of leveling e to a completed only in the 17th and 18th centuries, and of course not in all words at the same time. Alternations such as czas||wczesny, żal||o żeli are not the result of umlaut, but are probably the result of analogy such cases as krzyczał||krzyczeli, widział : widzieli : widzieć, etc.

==== Slanted é ====
At the end of the Proto-Slavic period, there existed originally short *e, lengthened *e, originally long *ě and shortened *ě. Inherited into Polish short *e and *ě could either remain short or be lengthened, and long *e and *ě could either remain long or shorten. Short *e and *ě could lengthen due to Polish innovations mentioned above, resulting in short e and long e, each of which having two origins, that is from short *e *ě and long *e *ě. Short e < *e: jeleń, leżę, lecę, miedza, mielę, nie, rzekę, ciekę, ciepły, ziele; short e < *ě: krzesło, krzepki, lewy, miech, miesiąc, niemy, wiek, wieża, bielić, w lecie, mierzyć, strzelić; long é < *e: jéż, narzékać, piérze, wiéść, niéść; long é < *ě: biég, césarz, chléb, chléw, kléj, miédź, rzéka, świéży, kléć, śiéca, biélmo, wiém. e and é also differ in quality: short e generally lowered to its current position, whereas é was higher and slightly more fronted. Some think that é could have been diphthongal, /ei/ and others think it was /je/.

Aside from é from *e ě, é could also arise from contraction of groups VjV, attested in the Holy Cross Sermons, Sankt Florian Psalter, and Gniezno Sermons:

1. *eje > é in the nominative, accusative, and vocative singular of neuter adjectival/pronominal soft declensions: pokolenie szukającé, trzeciéć przyrodzenie, napierwszé bogactwo;
2. *eje > é in the present tense of verbs such as umieć, rozumieć: umié, rozumiémy;
3. *eje > é in the phrase nie je (nie jest, nie ma) > nié;
4. *ejě > é in the genitive singular of soft feminine pronouns: w jé świętem żywocie;
5. *ějě > é in the genitive singular of compound feminine soft adjectives: matki bożé obraz, namniejszé pierzynki nie miał;
6. *ějě > é in the nominative, accusative, and vocative feminine singular and accusative masculine plural of compound soft-stem adjectives: wszystki przeciwiającé sie, bojącé się boga, syny bożé, na lędźwie najmocniejszé;
7. *oje > é in nominative, accusative, and vocative neuter singular of compound hard-stem adjectives: w kakié wrzemię, mocné bostwo, mdłé człowieczstwo;
8. *ojě > é in the genitive feminine singular of hard-stem pronouns: krola této ziemie, biskupowie této iste ziemie;
9. *yjě > é in the genitive feminine singular of compound hard-stem adjectives: wieczné śmirci, ludziem dobré wole, z krolewny niebieskié, nijedné gospody;
10. *yjě > é in the nominative, accusative and vocative feminine plural and masculine accusative plural of compound hard-stem adjectives: wielikié przyjaźni, we złé chustki, boleści śmiertné, boleści pkielné, kraje ziemskié, nad syny ludzkié, na święté swoje;
11. *ьje > é in the nominative, accusative and vocative of neuter nouns such as nauczanie and in the numeral trze: włodanié, oświecenié, trzé;
12. *aje > é in the ending *ajego of the genitive singular of compound masculine and neuter adjectives: człowieka grzesznégo, krola cnégo, syna dziewiczégo, nagłégo spadnienia;
13. *uje > é in the dative ending of compound masculine and neuter adjectives: bliźniému, utoka ubogiému, ku siercu wysokiému.

The change of *e > é||e and *ě > || é||e and the raising of é with the loss of contrastive length took place gradually over the 14th-16th century, resulting in slanted e. Within dialects, é is sometimes kept in all etymological positions, or sometimes leveled in morphological endings. In some dialects, it remains as a separate phoneme, in others it raises to y regardless of the hardness of the previous consonant, in others either raise to i after soft consonants or to y after hard consonants - this was common in the literary standard before the loss of é- or finally it can merge in some dialects with e - this is the rarest. See various articles on Dialects of Polish for details on individual dialects. In 1518, Zaborowski proposed writing é as ė, which was not widely accepted, but rather é became popular, or sometimes the digraph eé. Murzynowski in 1551 also suggests the use of é. However, only some publishers regularly distinguished the two, such as in Kochanowski's works, published by Łazarzowa from 1583 to 1585. Even those that attempt to distinguish the two do it inconsistently, often the fault of typesetters. Differentiating the two becomes even weaker in the 17th century; Grzegorz Knapski in 1621 complains about those who do not distinguish the two sounds, but he himself marks slanted é with clear e, as slanted å is used for clear a. As a result, e is used for both phonemes in the 18th century, and Onufry Kopczyński suggests differentiating the two in specific conditions in his grammar from 1778 to 1783, but many of his suggestions are not etymologically motivated and are the result of his own invention or dialectal influence. é sees more use in the 18th century, particularly in certain words or endings, as can be seen in Linde's dictionary or the Vilnius dictionary, and finally é was removed in the 1891 orthography reform.

Thus, é likely remained in common use in the 16th century and its use was limited over the course of the 17th and 18th centuries. Phonetics was one factor in this loss, i.e. the neighboring sounds. For example, the ending -éj was often realized as -yj, or -égo in some dialects could be realized as -ego or -égo depending on the previous consonant: dobrego but taniégo. Analogy also played a major role: zielé > ziele, based on pole, dobrégo > dobrego based on tego. The Eastern nobility also influenced this, which had either only e or raised é to y, i, seen in Rej's rhymes. Another potential cause for this was a feeling that é was unpredictable and difficult to know how to mark in text. Finally the fact it had a low semantic load also contributed to its disappearance.

The phonological and phonetic separateness of é began to be lost in the 17th and 18th centuries, and in the 19th century it merged wither with ‘i||y or e, then the awareness of é and where it should be weakened, meaning it became less and less marked in texts, marked usually for grammatical norms; replacing é with ‘i||y weakens in the 19th century, often being replaced more with e, and this is finalized with the 1891 orthography reform. The most likely cause of the spread is likely the result from when Warsaw became the capital in 1800, crossing two literary systems: the Greater-Polish/Lesser Polish system and the Masovian system, as the Masovian realization of é spreads from Masovia in the 19th century to the literary area of Lesser Poland and Greater Poland, replacing i/y. The orthography reform of 1891 replacing é with e was also likely adopted by schools, where e would be pronounced as written, and the normative influence of schools also likely spread this pronunciation, and realizations with y||i were seen as wrong. A few words that historically had é, at least in textbooks from the 19th century, sometimes have y||i in colloquial or jocular pronunciation within Standard Polish. This is the result of maintaining the old pronunciation of the intellectual elite as well as adoption of dialectal substrates and influence in one's speech, often done for expressive reasons. The change of -ej > -yj||-ij is nearly common throughout, probably from the result of final -j (tamtyj, zdrowyj, jednyj, jij, nij, drzyj, starzyj, szybcij, only trzej remains without raising). Slanted é was kept in the general language for longer; é originally merged with i or y in the 17th century, but clear e was often reintroduced via analogy (e.g. dobrégo becomes dobrego like tego); dialects show much diversity in the development of é, but it is often kept via alternations or as a separate phoneme.

==== Proto-Slavic *a ====
Proto-Slavic *a gives inherited a. Already in the pre-Polish era, a developmental change of *a took place in whereby the original Proto-Slavic length, long or short, was only sometimes retained, but in other cases long vowels were shortened and short vowels were lengthened, see § Vowel length and clear vs slanted vowels - this means that in pre-Polish and medieval Polish there was long á from late Proto-Slavic long *ā and short a from late Proto-Slavic short *a and long ā which was shortened in Polish, and finally Polish ā from contraction. Examples of contraction include:

1. *aja > á in the nominative singular of feminine compound adjectives and the nominative, accusative, and vocative plural of neuter compound adjectives: świętá Katerzyna, słowa znamienitá;
2. *aje > á in the second and third singular and the second plural present tense of -am verbs: pobudz’’’á’’’ ponęcá i powabiá, wyprawiá się, rozpaczász, but okopaje przywitaje is attested as well in the 15th century; to that time -znajesz, -znaje after a prefix: poznajesz, wyznajemy, doznajecie;
3. *oja > á in the stem of the infinitive of the verbs stoję, boję się: Mojżesz wybrany jego stáł, będzie stáć, nie będę się báć;
4. *eja > á in the stem of the infinitive of verbs like wieję : wiać, grzeję : grzać: (Parkoszowic) (ch)wiáł (faal), wiáł (vaal), but in Sankt Florian Psalter chwiejali głową;
5. *ьja > á in the nominative plural in cases where the ending begins with a: sędziá or in collective nouns braciá, and in the declension of nouns of the type przykazanie, zboże (those which originally had the ending *-ьj-): sąmnieniá, przyszciá, głos skurszeniá, od narodzeniá, do widzeniá, pokoleniá.

Long á was rarely marked orthographically with aa in the medieval period, but even circa 1516 you can see aa. Parkoszowic attempted to popularize this, but in the same work (be it either that Parkoszowic made a mistake or his copyist) sometimes writes the same word without double aa, or in words where one would expect aa it is missing.

In terms of sound quality, short a was likely /a/ and long á was likely /ɒː/, and once length distinction was lost, clear a and slanted á remained. It's also likely these two vowels didn't sound much different, as they often rhyme in Rej's texts. However old texts systematically and regularly distinguish the two, imperfectives (frequentatives) often having it: zaráżać and perfectives do not: zarazić, wysłáwiać, wysławić. The word nie could affect slanting: dáj but nie daj, mász but nie masz. á also appears in the stem of the non-compound passive participles as a predicative: dán, dána, dáno, but a appears in compound forms: dany, dana, dane. na(-) and za(-) appear in prepositions and prefixes verbs derived from other verbs and ná(-) zá(-) appear near a nominal. The dative plural of feminine nouns always have -ám, and the instrumental plural -ami, the locative plural shows -ach ten times more than -ách.

Generally the letters ⟨á å⟩ more often represented the phoneme clear /a/, and ⟨a⟩ more often represented slanted /ɒ/, but the opposite could occur; this is the opposite of Murzynowski's suggestions, and dominated from the middle of the 16th century and through the 17th and 18th centuries. There are also some Borderlands poets which do not differentiate a and á, e.g. Mikołaj Sęp Szarzyński, Szymon Szymonowic, and Józef Bartłomiej Zimorowic rhyme the two; Jan Kochanowski does not, meaning that Ruthenian nobility influenced the merger of slanted á with clear a. There are also cases of inconsistent marking, the result of oversight on behalf of the typesetter or proofreader, as the difference between the two was strongly felt even in the 17th century.derlands poets, and slanted á disappears ultimately in the 18th century.

But like slanted é, the difference between the two likely started to blur starting in the 16th century, meaking it the earliest slanted vowel of the three to be lost. Exemplary of this is how the alternation of á||a in the present tense vs infinitive began to disappear (similar to ą:ę, sądzę || sędzić): báczę||baczyć, etc. This alternations clearly fluctuates in the 16th century, with some verbs preserving it better than others. The original state could be seen in some infinitives, and in other cases in the imperative. The pronunciation was not often certain everywhere, and proofreaders did not manage well with these uncertainties. This process strengthens in the 17th century through the beginning of the 18th century, where the it finishes and á disappears from the literary standard around the middle of the 18th century.

Nitsch explains this as being the result of Ruthenian Poles, who merged á with a. The north Masovian dialects around Warsaw, which had become the capital, also did not have á. The loss of á is also associated with the mixing of populations meeting from different places in an area with a low population.

Dialects preserve á much better than the standard, as the majority of Polish dialects did not merge the two phonemes. See articles on particular dialects for more.

In early dialects, beginning before the 12th century, the initial cluster ra- changed to re-, found even in the oldest texts a change attested in northern and central Poland, e.g. rano > reno. The range of ra- > re- shrank with time and now appears only in a few northern dialects. Similarly initial ja- > changed to je-, but the range of this was less north than ra- > re-, and also affected Silesia, and is attested as early as the 12th century.

==== Proto-Slavic *o ====
Proto-Slavic *o gives o, with later changes in length similar to those that occurred with slanted é and á. Short o generally remains unchanged.

In some adverbial pronouns with an accusative neuter singular origin it was lost word-finally already in the Old Polish period: tako, jako, tamo, owako, inako, jednako > tak, jak, owak, inak, jednak, kako was lost entirely. jako and tako remain in this fossilized expression, and jako as a comparative/copulative word. Dialectally tamo still exists.

o often undergoes epenthesis, usually with /w/, called labialization (labializacja), spelled ⟨ô⟩, which can be seen in most dialects, especially initially; rarely h (/x/) may appear, and rarer still w (/v/). Fewer dialects have no labialization. In a large area in the south west of the above-mentioned line all the way to the mountains in the south labilization becomes stronger and stronger. Labialization can depend on place, speed of speech, individual carefulness of the speaker, and sometimes on the quality of the preceding consonant; palatal and front consonants are less likely to be associated with labialization: pôle, kôść are very common, rôście, dôbry are frequent, sôstra, ciôtka are rare. In places where ł changes to /w/, labialized o and ło can be confused, e.g. pot and płot might sound the same as /pwɔt/. People with this when trying to speak formally will often hypercorrect and remove etymological /w/, e.g. łopata > opata. In all of Poland, o often raised to ó before nasals, meaning that the dialectal realizations are etymological with Old Polish texts.

ó had more changes than o. Probably already in the preliterate era ó differed in quality from o as well as in length, raising and tensing, especially at the end of articulation, approaching u, giving /oː/ in contrast to /ɔ/. In the Middle Sges length was lost and the quality difference remained, giving o (/ɔ/) and ó (/o/).

Orthographically, ó began to be marked differently in the first quarter of the 16th century, and Murzynowski also recommends distinguishing the two, but only a few publishers in the 16th century regularly and consistently distinguish the two. Kopczyński reintroduced ó into the orthography at the beginning of the 19th century, from which time it has remained.

Kochanowski has particular rhymes that often suggest ó being closer to o, but sometimes merging with u before r, Rej has a similar tendency, Knapski in 1621 shows there was still a difference in the 17th century, but he likely had labialization for ó, but fluctuation before r also occurs. Zimorowic (1629) in Roksolanki and Bartłomiej in Roczyzna and Żałoba (1654) have the opposite trend - rhymes where u lowering to ó before r n can be seen in the 16th century in Rej's and Kochanowski's texts. Odymalski (Obleżenie Jasnej Góry Częstochowskiej, pre 1673) shows a tendency to raise ó towards u. It is difficult to say if these rhymes were accurate of pronunciation, or if they were near rhymes.

Grammarians’ recommendations from the 17th and 18th centuries do not shed much light, as often phones are not distinguished from letters, sometimes resulting in a perceived phonetic difference where one does not exist; also, sometimes these grammars are written by foreigners or for foreigners, and so sometimes the content of the work is simplified, and sometimes these grammarians generalize observations made about folk speech and attribute them to educated speech. Mesgnien in Grammatica seu institutio polonice linguae (1649) says that ó approaches u, but is clearly distinct from it, but is closer to u than o. Cassius in Lehrgebäude der polnischen Sprache (1797) says that the accent on ó is used to distinguish it from “pure o” and to pronounce it like u. Grammarians of the 19th century also confused letters and sounds, but many from the century comment that ó is barely different from u. Sochański in Brzmienie głosek polskich i pisownia polska (1861) says that some pronounce ó as u, but the majority pronounce it as a sound between o and u.

Many efforts were made during the 1936 reform to completely remove ó, but they were generally met with resistance, and ó was removed in a few words such as żuraw, bruzda, pruć, chrust. The reason ó had more resilience than é and á orthographically is likely because it merged with /u/; once á merged with a then there were no morphophonological alternations; conversely because é regionally alternated with i||y, it remained in the orthography for longer, until it merged with clear e in the standard. Since ó merged phonetically with /u/ in the standard, there were many morphophonological alternations, giving a phonetic justification for it to remain in the orthography.

In general the current distribution of ó||o is in agreement with the distribution of old long ó, except before nasals, as o tended to raise to ó before nasals in Old Polish and Middle Polish, e.g. dóm, which is not always seen today. ó also appears in Old and Middle Polish before ł and r, e.g. aniół, klasztór, sometimes before j, e.g. dójdzie, pójmuje, and before -ż, e.g. kogóż; also in the past tense of verbs with a consonantal stem, e.g. mógłeś, wiódłem, odniósłeś, and the word dróga.

As a result, modern Standard Polish shows much uncertainty, e.g. dwom||dwóm, spódnica||spodnica. This is the result of phonetic, morphological-analogical, or dialectal factors.

Sometimes dialects lack slanting where it exists in the standard or vice versa, forms such as ktory, gora, klotka exist, as well as dróga and Greater Polish szkólny. Vilnius Polish has much notable deviation, seen in Adam Mickiewicz’s works: zbojca, brzozka, ogrodek, but also spójrzeć, ostróżny, paciórek.

Thus slanted ó began to weaken in the 16th century in its phonetic uniqueness with, but a clear opposition remained in the 17th century after which a tendency to raise it occurs, merging it with u; this process finishes in the 19th century. Ruthenian nobility likely also influenced this. This process intensifies in the 17th century supported by Masovian and Lesser Polish pronunciations, as ó developed here differently than é. Then ó realized as u becomes popular enough that it likely becomes part of the literary standard by the 19th century, but remains part of the orthography thanks to Kopczyńśki’s and his successors’ efforts as well as morphophonological alternations.

==== Proto-Slavic *u ====
Proto-Slavic *u gives u. Proto-Slavic *u could be either long or short - as with other vowels in prehistoric Polish this length could change, and both long and short u entered the earliest stages of the language, probably with no difference in quality between the long and short variants. Only Pomeranian dialects keep traces of this length distinction, and not everywhere. Traces of short u is best seen after front consonants, where it became ë, like with old short i and y. After back and labial consonants it usually stayed as short u, sometimes developing as long u: sëchi, szëmiec, łëpic, lëdze, brzëch, cëdzy, and also puscëc, buk, mucha, kupic, gubic, chudy, juńc. Short u lowered in a similar manner as short i, giving a characteristic reflex: a short low reflex vs a long high one.

Otherwise u remains unchanged throughout Polish. In a few instances it became i for often uncertain reasons: litować < lutować, Inowrocław < Junowłodzisław. This is probably motivated by similar articulatory reasons as the e > o umlaut, as i is the front equivalent of u in terms of height, much like the relationship between e and o. During the Old Polish and Middle Polish period, u often lowers to o before n, ń, m: Dunajec||Donajec, punczocha||ponczocha, słuńce||słońce. This fluctuation can still occur in more recent Polish: tłumaczyć||tłomaczyć, tłumok||tłomok, tytuń||tytoń, and also dialectal realizations such as grónt, fónt, and sometimes before r: góra, chmóra.

==== Proto-Slavic *ę and *ǫ ====
There were two nasal vowels in Proto-Slavic, front mid *ę and back mid *ǫ, which both could be long and short - the oldest Polish reflexes are found in texts from the 12th century.

During this epoch there were probably nasal vowels of two different qualities, [æ̃] and [ɑ̃] and, based on later reflexes, nasal vowels underwent considerable changes in terms of length, namely, the length of the nasals was shortened in some positions already in the final phase of the development of Proto-Slavic; therefore, in Polish there are long nasals continuing some of the Late Proto-Slavic short nasals or from that part of the Late Proto-Slavic long nasals that were shortened in Polish. Pre-Polish also has long *ǫ that does not continue Proto-Slavic *ǭ, but is the result of contraction of *ojǫ, *ejǫ, *ьjǫ: wodą < *vodojǫ, sobą < sobojǫ, moją < mojejǫ, wsią < vьsьjǫ and long ǫ resulting from compensatory lengthening after the loss of yers (see § Vowel length and prosody). Therefore, at the beginning of the literate period in the 12th and 13th centuries the following reflexes can be reconstructed: *ę *ǫ : /æ̃/||/ɑ̃/, /æ̃ː/||/ɑ̃ː/. The quality, which lowered in both cases, was originally determined by the quality in Proto-Slavic, so *ę > /æ̃ː/||/æ̃/, *ǫ > /ɑ̃ː/||/ɑ̃/, except after umlaut, which could result in ǫ occurring after hard consonants (see the Lechitic umlaut, but the results of this were already beginning to blur) of *ęt, ęd, ęs, ęz, ęn, ęr, ęl (all hard) > *ǫt, ǫd, ǫs, ǫz, ǫn, ǫr, ǫl, e.g. Świą́t, Świą́tosz, Trzą́sowo, Trzą́siwuct, Czą́stobor. The quality of these four nasal vowels change in the 13th and 14th centuries, as is reflected in texts from this period, namely, both nasals, originally written from ⟨an⟩, ⟨am⟩, are written identically with the letter ⟨ꟁ⟩, which saw its first use in the 13th century and spread in the 14th century, then in the 15th century, ⟨ą⟩ begins to see similar use for both nasals. Therefore, during the Old Polish era the nasal vowels merged into one vowel in terms of quality, and at the same time, a distinction in terms of length continued: /ã/ < ([/æ̃/ < *ę]||/ɑ̃/ < *ǫ]) and ą̄ < ([/æ̃ː/ < *ę|/ɑ̃ː/ < *ǫ]).

As with other long vowels, there was somewhat of a custom to write the long nasal with a doubled letter, ⟨ąą⟩ or ⟨ꟁꟁ⟩. Parkoszowic also distinguishes them, but only when it is necessary to avoid confusion, that is contrastively, such as mꟁka and mꟁꟁka.

The first signs of the modern nasal system can be seen in the 15th-16th century, namely that the long and short nasal vowels begin to differ in quality again, akin to clear and slanted a:á, e:é, o:ó. The result is that ą (ǫ) comes from the old long vowel and ę comes from the old short vowel. The first document that suggests this change is Psalter of Puławy, which has some of the same psalms as Sankt Florian Psalter, but written orthographically differently. This development was assuredly gradual and did not yield the same results in all dialects of modern Poland.

Some texts from the beginning of the 16th century continue the tradition of marking nasals with the same letter: ą or a̩, then in the 1630s, the front nasal was written e̩ and the back one ą, and in the middle of the century the letters ę ą were used, meaning the front nasal was pronounced as a front, somewhat raised: [æ̃], which, with time and in Greater Poland, moved more forward; in Lesser Poland around the middle of the 16th century however, the realization was probably [ɛ̃] and sometimes even e, which can be seen in rhymes in Mikołaj Rej’s poetry. Franciscus a Mesgnien Meninski states clearly that ę is as French en as in mien, tien, sien. The back nasal was probably originally [ã], which later backed and raised to [ɑ̃] or even [ɔ̃]. The realization ą is evidenced by spellings such as ąm, an, au and by the grammarian Jeremiasz Roter (1618), and by rhymes. The realization [ɑ̃] is evinced by grammarians from the 16th and 17th centuries, Pierre Statorius (1568) says it’s like “dark a”, Ostroróg (c. 1600) claims it to be a diphthong composed of the sound of á and the letter o through the nose. The pronunciation [ɔ̃] is evinced by spellings such as on, un o, and a remark from Volckmar (1612), and with a similar remark from Mesgnien. This clearly shows that the realization of the back nasal depended on region, and within the literary standard [ɔ̃] eventually became widespread. The orthography of ⟨ę⟩ ⟨ą⟩ are established in relation to their original literary realizations (/ɛ̃/ and /ã/), and later when /ã/ raised to /ɔ̃/, the orthography did not change. The qualitative changes ended in the 16th century, and in the 17th century the modern realization of the decomposition of nasals before non-sibilant consonants to eN, oN, denasalization before l and ł, and denasalization of final -ę occurred.

Inflection also plays a role in the development:

1. During the Middle Polish era and part of the New Polish era soft-stem feminine nouns ending -a took -ę or -ǫ in the accusative singular. -ę slowly replaced -ǫ during the 19th century and is the current dominant form;
2. Verbs with a nasal stem such as sądzić, wątpić, rządzić, wiązać, żądać, oglądać, pędzić, kręcić showed the alternation of ę:ǫ in the Middle Polish era that was in accordance with etymological changes: ǫ would appear in the present and past tense, and ę in the infinitive and imperative: sądzę, sądził : sędzić sędź etc. Analogical leveling tended to remove this alternation, with one nasal winning in all stems for a given verb;
3. The accusative feminine singular of pronouns til the 19th century had -ę: owę, moję, naszę, now only retained in tę, but this is often colloquially and predominantly tą. In the second half of the century, -’ǫ began to replace it modeled on adjectives. Sporadically the inverse can be seen: starę, zdrowę;
4. The Old Polish divide between mię cię się after pronouns and mie cie sie after verbs was lost in the 16th century;
5. Aside from these categories, there are many words in which leveling towards either ę or ǫ took place, and many orthoepeic dictionaries fluctuate as to which of two forms is more correct: gąsior:gęsior, grzęznąć:grząznąć, okrąg:okręg, zasiąg:zasięg, mięs:miąs, pięter:piątr, piętrowy:piątrowy, siędę:siądę, osiągnąć:osięgnąć, ciążyć:ciężyć, tysięczny:tysiączny, etc. In the past świątość occurred but was leveled with święty, piątno, piądź, w nię, now piętno, piędź, w nią, etc.

Secondary nasalization also occurs as well as loss of nasalization, the causes of which include analogy or a neighboring nasal consonant, otherwise it may happen sporadically, e.g. między < miedzy, tęskny, tesknota < teskny, tesknowa (compare utyskiwanie), częstować < czestować (cześć), paszczęka < paszczeka, jeniec jeńca < jęciec, jęćca (jąć); uczestnik < uczęstnik, Old Polish szczeście szczesny (część). The dialectal distribution of nasal reflexes or denasalization is highly complex, and is described more in individual articles on Polish dialects.

==== Proto-Slavic yers *ь and *ъ ====
Proto-Slavic two weak vowels often called yers. The soft yer *ь was front and softened preceding consonants - it gives e in strong position; the hard yer *ъ was back and did not soften the preceding consonant - it gives e in strong position, but distinct from e of other origin, as the consonant before it is hard. There are traces of *ъ causing rounding in early texts, e.g. Lokna (1153), Lukna (13th century) next to Lekna (1136), all modern Łekno. Similarly ku has u instead of expected e (*kie || k); ku mnie||k tobie. During the Proto-Slavic period, yers could be either weak or strong, resulting in four yers, the strong hard yer, the weak hard yer, the strong soft yer, and the weak soft yer - these four yers enter the earliest prehistoric Polish vocalic system, but in the 11th century, after the *e > o, *ě > a umlaut, after which many changes regarding them occur, namely strong hard yer changes e with a preceding hard or functionally hard (ḱ ǵ) and strong soft yer > ‘e with a preceding soft or hardened consonant; weak hard yer disappears and similarly weak soft yer disappears but sometimes leaves behind a soft or softened consonant that preceded it, strengthening the phonemic opposition of hard and soft consonants. The oldest attested signs of the development of yers can be seen in the 12th century in Bull of Gniezno and Bulls of Wrocław, Golec = Gołęk < *golъkъ, Quatec = Kwiatek < *květъkъ, and there are no traces of them still being vowels in the earliest texts.

The loss of yers also led to compensatory lengthening, morphophonological alternations of mobile e||∅ the end of the law of open syllables, a strengthening of the contrast between hard and soft consonants, and complex consonant clusters (see § Simplifications of consonant clusters).

Rules that do not conform to the above include:

1. Final *-ъjь > -y in compound adjectival declensions;
2. Final *-ьjь > -i in compound adjectival declensions, the genitive plural of feminine nouns, now consonantal, e.g. kości;
3. -ьj- > -ij- || -yj- (after hardened consonants) in verbs, e.g. biję, wiję, nouns, e.g. żmija, szyja, and the pronoun czyj;
4. Initial *jь- developed in two ways; if it started a sentence, i.e. was in the absolute initial position (i.e. beginning the utterance) > i, e.g. idę, igra, imać, imieć; if it came after a term ending in a vowel > *j > ∅, e.g. gra, skra, mam, mieć; after a prefix ending in a vowel *jь > j (zajdę, dojdę, najdę). Later either only the i- form was kept, e.g. igła, iglica, ikra, or both are used, e.g. idę, zajdę, sometimes with a changed meaning, e.g. igrać vs grać, sometimes with a stylistic difference, e.g. iskra vs skra;
5. The accusative masculine singular of the pronoun *jь > ji, later replaced in the 16th century by jego, go;
6. If a prefix ended in ъ, and the base started with i-, resulting in ъi, then in Old Polish y (zysk, odydę). Later levellings changed this to odejdę based on other similar verbs.

Resulting forms often undergo analogical leveling, whereby mobile e (|| ∅) often became fixed in its position, e.g. Old Polish sjem || sejmie (locative singular) became fixed sejm || sejmie, additionally oblique forms of szmer changing to szmer- (originally szemr-, e.g. genitive singular szemra), or psek reshaping to piesek from oblique stems like genitive singular pieska or sometimes a lost vowel was added back in, e.g. deska from original cka. Such processes can be observed as early as Bull of Gniezno, showing mobile e, which often has -ek in the nominative, but sometimes just -k, the result of analogy to oblique forms, and similarly -ec shows a loss of -e- due to similar leveling. This shows that at that time two tendencies occurs, keeping etymological forms and leveling, but these forms without -e- remain in northern dialects of Poland.

Another deviation is that e resulting from yers sometimes acts as e resulting from *e, sometimes then becoming o: dzionek, dzionka instead of *dnek, *dzienka, wioska from wieś, and also etymological but uncommon osieł alongside more common osioł, kozieł alongside kozioł.

Next to e || ∅ from strong yers is e in a place where there never was a yer, but in a form resulting in a consonant cluster: ogień, węzeł, węgiel, later mydełko instead of mydłko; braterski from bratski, piosenka instead of *piasnka, and in the borrowed suffix -unek, from earlier -unk, as late as the 16th century, from German -ung.

The prepositions/prefixes *vъ(-) sъ(-) > *w(e)(-)/*z(e)(-) also showed uncertainty as to whether the yer accompanying them was weak or strong, as these acted as clitics, being part of the same accentuation unit as another word, meaning that Havlík's law determines the distribution of e or ∅, resulting in the current alternation of w || we and z s || ze. Alternating forms of prefixes last longer as they are indivisible from the word and were repeated more. Prepositional forms on the other hand are separate and are used in conjunction with many more words and thus can't connect accentually to the next word, and as a result show more fluctuation; and so after the loss of awareness of yers, phonotactics then decides more often which form is used, usually in order to avoid uncomfortable consonant clusters, such as doubled ones, e.g. we Wrocławiu, we wtorek, we Francji, ze zwierzyńca, ze strachu. The prepositions przed(e), od(e), nad(e), przez(e), bez(e) underwent a similar process. Dialects in southern Lesser Poland, Silesia, and to a lesser extent in central Poland and Greater Poland show forms with -e much more frequently.

Within dialects mobile e is often lost in oblique cases, e.g. bes || besu next to standard bez || bzu, or epenthetic e is inserted, wiater next to standard wiatr, or being in a different position: szwiec, szwieca next to standard szewc || szewca, see also § Declension of masculine nouns. In the north -e- in nominative masculine forms and genitive feminine/neuter plural forms is often missing: podwieczórk, paznokć, krawc. During the Old Polish era this was likely a regular phenomenon encompassing Masovia, Pomerania, and even north-east Greater Poland.

==== Proto-Slavic yers *ъr *ъl *ьr *ьl (*TъrT *TъlT *TьrT *TьlT) ====
Proto-Slavic had sonorant diphthongs *ъr *ъl *ьr *ьl, within Lechitic they vocalized in diverse ways from yers, especially *ъl. This vocalization likely took place in the 10th century and not earlier than the 12th century, that is during the same era as the Lechitic umlaut, and after the Proto-Slavic palatalization of *k *g > *č *ž; *ьl was an early important isogloss between northern and southern Poland, and further an important isogloss between other Slavic dialects.

Proto-Slavic *TъrT generally gives TarT with few exceptions, found in the Bull of Gniezno: Carna = Karna, Carz = Kars - this a can be of two lengths, both long TárT and short TarT, which is the result of secondary shortening, see above, and the future development of this long and short a is identical to the development of long and short a otherwise: *bъrkъ > bark, *gъrdlo > gardło.

Proto-Slavic *TьrT is varied within prehistoric Polish, and the result depended on the following consonant and its length. The clarity of the development is further muddied by later independent developments and leveling, etc.:

1. Before a hard front consonant t d s z n ł *TьrT > TarT, and the cluster hardens, including after a hard consonant and cz ż, e.g. wartki < *vьrtъkъ; the resulting a could be long or short and develops according to later clear and slanted a;
  1. Masovian and Kashubian changes this to 'a, keeping softness, e.g. Masovian siarna (standard sarna) < *sьrna, Kashubian cwiardi (Polish twardy) < *tvьrdъ; this is also present in a few words in Polish like ćwiartka, dziarksi;
2. Before any other consonant group, *TьrT > T’irT or T’irzT, e.g. wiercić < Old Polish wircić < *vьrtiti, which later lowered to e, developing according to clear and slanted e.

As a result of this, there is sometimes an alternation of T’irT||TarT, see § Proto-Slavic *ě. Leveling can occur, ziarna is likely the result of analogy with the locative zirnie, and ćwirdza, ćwirdzić assimilated to twardy, giving twi(e)rdza, twi(e)rdzić.

The cluster *TьrT always gives either r or rz; rz usually occurring before labials and back consonants, e.g. wierzba, with a few exceptions, such as cierpieć.

Northern dialects establish ‘ér everywhere except czerwony: śmiérć, piérsi, sérce, ciérpieć, piérszy; in Southern Poland and now including Krajna, er can be seen in some terms: ćwierć, piersi, śmierć, serce, and in others ér: ciérpieć, siérp, piérszy, wiérzba, wiérzch; the amount of terms with ér fluctuates by region. Forms like myrdać, styrczeć, tyrkować show a regional realization from southern and central Poland and when these forms entered the general language they were often de-dialectalized to have -er-.

The word portki instead of *partki is an East-Slavic borrowing; korczak and storczyk have unexplained -or-; czarni instead of expected *czerni likely arose via leveling to other oblique forms of czarny and analogy to words like żarł, darcie, and darł; żerdka likely arose via analogy to żerdź; czerstwy has irregular -er-; ziarno instead of Old Polish zarno arose via leveling to the locative form zirnie; Old Polish ćwirdza, ćwirdzić were morphologically reinnovated based on twardy.

Exceptionally *TъrT give ur in e.g. kurcz, burczeć, turkotać, gurbić się, kurpie, purchawka; burczeć and turkotać are likely phonologically motivated and partially onomatopoeic, whereas the other cases are likely the result of coarticulation with either a labial or velar consonant.

Original *TъlT generally gives ł and a vowel, which can vary depending on the preceding consonant:

1. After a dental consonant TъlT > TłuT, e.g. słup < *stъlbъ;
2. After a labial consonant TъlT > TołT mowa < Old Polish mołwa < *mъlva; the resulting o could be long or short and develops according to later clear and slanted o;
3. After a velar consonant TъlT > T’ełT, e.g. kiełbasa < *kъlbasa.

A trace that Proto-Slavic long *TъlT partially retained length and partially shortened can be seen in the Old Polish alternation such as mowić||mówię, which was later leveled, now only see in mowa : mówić; length differentiation could also be seen in puł < poł||pełk. Kashubian often shows different reflexes, some forms possibly being the influence of the rest of Polish and some being purely Pomeranian.

The cluster *TьlT generally gives ł, rarely l, and the vowel can depend on the preceding consonant:

1. After a dental consonant TьlT > tłut, e.g. długi < *dьlgъ;
2. After *č *ž, from softened *k g, čьlč > čelč, but after umlaut > čołt||čółt; žьlt > želt, and after umlaut > žołt||žółt, e.g. tłusty < *tъlstъ;
3. After labials, there are two possibilities, depending on the following consonant:
  1. After a labial before a hard dental TьlT > TełT, e.g. pełzać < *pьlzati; but compare northern dialectal wiołna, piołł, see below;
  2. After a labial before other consonants TьlT > T’ilT, e.g. wigla < *jьvьlg.,

Alternations such as zółw but żołna, czółno but dialectal czołen show that length inherited from Proto-Slavic was shortened. The forms pełnię, pełnić, wełnie are exceptions, and the expected forms would be *pilnię, *pilnić, *wilnie, and are the result of early leveling where in other forms etymological eł is present, e.g. etymology wełna and pełny.

In northern Poland *ьl deviates after labials, as labials kept their original softness, e.g. pielli, wywielga; if e was before a hard dental consonant, then it underwent dispalatalization to o: wiołna, piołny, miołł, umiołty, piołł, and even wywiołka and can be attested as early as the 13th century in placenames like Stolpia (1204) (modern Słupia), Stolp (1240) (modern Słupsk), and Chołm (1136). This can be seen in some places of Masovia and neighboring areas, but even here always wilk, milceć; only in Kashubia you also see wołk, môłczëc; sometimes in Kashubia the softness of the labial is kept.

==== Proto-Slavic diphthongs *or *ol *er *el ====
Proto-Slavic *or *ol *er *el developed differently depending on whether it was initial or medial; in Polish, initial orT, olT developed in two ways:

1. If orT olT had a circumflex tone, then metathesis occurred to roT-, loT-: rola < *orlьja, łokieć <*olkъtь;
2. If orT olT had an acute tone, then metathesis and o > an occurred to raT-, laT-: radło < *ordlo, łaknąć < *olknǫti.

Inherited examples of erT-, elT- do not occur.

Medial *TorT, *TolT, *TerT, *TelT within Lechitic and Sorbian likely saw a yer inserted between the liquid and the consonant with metathesis, so TъroT, TъloT, TьreT, TьleT (see § Proto-Slavic *e); however this insertion of the yer didn't happen everywhere, and a lack of metathesis can be seen, see below on *TorT, TolT.

Initial *orT olT gave two results depending on the pitch within the diphthong:

1. *orT with a acute pitch gave raT: radło< *ordlo, ramię < *ormę;
2. *orT with a circumflex pitch gave roT: robić < *orbit, równy < *orvьnъ, roz- < *orz-, rożen < *oržьnъ;
3. *olT with a acute pitch gave łaT: łabędź < *olbǫdь, łaknąć < *olknǫti, łakomy < *olkomъ, łania < *olni;
4. *olT with a circumflex pitch gave łoT: łódź < *oldi, łokieć < *olkъtь.

Medial *TorT, *TolT likely became TъroT, TъloT. This can be seen in the albeit irregular use of the prepositions and prefixes w(-), z(-), which lost yers in accordance to Havlík's law: we wromotę, ze krolestwa. The presence of long ó or short o is a continuation of the preliterate and medieval alternation of o and ó, which is the result of the Polish dual result of the original length of the cluster *TorT, TolT, which was either kept or shortened, e.g. brona < *borna, kłócić < *koltiti, płótno < *poltьno. The reflex *TarT is found only exceptionally, especially only in old texts, occurring much more in Kashubian and even more in Slovincian; whether the reflex was TarT or TroT depends on the intonation of the syllable. Forms with TarT were later leveled due to analogy with forms with TroT as well as Polish influence.

Medial *TerT, *TelT is parallel to *TorT, *TolT and gave TreT, TleT, which underwent later changes appropriate for the phones, namely:

1. r near e softens to rz;
2. e depending on the length changes to e||é, see § Slanted é;
3. e > o in accordance with umlaut;
4. o > o||ó depending on length § Proto-Slavic *o.

This means that the Polish reflexes of *TerT are:

1. TrzeT||TrzéT, e.g. brzeg < Old Polish brzég < *bergъ, drzewo < *dervo. The prefix prze-, in Old Polish only a preposition (seen in przecz, przebóg), continuing *per-, usually stood before a consonant that began the next word, resulting in *perT, which is why it underwent the same metathesis. The terms trzemcha, trześnia, trzewa, trzewik, and Old Polish trzem with initial trz- come from older czrz-, attested as late as the 15th century;
2. TrzoT||TrzóT, e.g. brzoza < *berza, śród < Old Polish śrzód < *serdъ, including trz- resulting from czrz-, and unexpected trzop. The prefixes/prepositions przed(-) przez(-) did not undergo umlaut perhaps due to the fact they act as clitics, and the word they attached to could start with a hard or soft consonant, meaning that *prezъ *pŕedъ could change to *prezь *pŕedь, and that could stop umlaut, and then analogical leveling from the second type, i.e. without umlaut, spread.
- TelT has the reflexes:
1. TleT||TléT e.g. mleko < Old Polish mléko < *melko, plewa < *pelva;
2. TłoT||TłóT szłom< *šelmъ, żłób < *želbъ.

Some words, such as brzoza and środa < śrzoda seem to break the chronology with relation to umlaut, as the softness of the consonant suggests an original e, which later changed to o. In the words człon, szłom, and żłób, o is preceded by hard, suggested original *čolnъ šolmъ žolbъ, but o after these consonants was not present, meaning that the original forms were *čelnъ šelmъ želbъ, with umlaut happened in pre-Polish and before metathesis: *čelnъ šelmъ želbъ > *čolnъ šolmъ žolbъ > *člonъ šlomъ žlobъ.

In Slovincian, TelT merged with TolT. Forms such as płóc, młóc are found across all of Kashubia, and even in Greater Poland.

=== Consonants ===
Polish undergoes major changes in terms of palatalization, changing both inherited palatal consonants and innovating some new ones, especially via the general changes in West Slavic and Lechitic from Proto-Slavic. Inherited soft consonsants initially remained soft, and later depalatalized; other consonants palatalized near front consonants, and after umlaut and the loss of yers, also phonemicized.

==== Proto-Slavic *p *b and the rise of *ṕ *b́ ====
p remains without change, e.g. płakać < *plakati, spać < *sъpati, chłop < *xolpъ.

b is without change except when word-final or before a voiceless consonant, where it phonetically devoices, e.g. baba < *baba, dąb (pronounced domp) < *dǫbъ, babka (pronounced bapka) < *babъka. Devoicing, triggered by the loss of yers, began before the 15th century and finished in this century; this is true for all voiced and voiceless consonants.

If p and b were near a front consonant or j, they palatalized, later phonemicizing to ṕ b́ after Lechitic umlaut: pić < *piti, piec < *peťi, bić < *biti, biesiada < *besěda. Proto-Slavic had epenthetic *ľ in *pj bj, but this was lost in pre-literate Polish, e.g. kupię < *kupľǫ (first person singular of kupić < *kupiti), gubię < *gubľǫ (first person singular of gubiti), except in a few words: kropla, grobla, przerębla, dialectal grable. Old Polish also has kropia, grobia, rzerębia, and now almost everywhere grabie except in a few dialects.

ṕ b́ before another consonant or word-finally hardened to p b, e.g. drop < *drop, drób (pronounced drup) < *drobь prać < *pьrati, brać < *bьrati. These soft consonants were written until the middle of the 19th century, but their phonetic hardening began during the Middle Polish era; Roter at the beginning of the 17th century says that Poles should say these soft, but they do not.

ṕ b́ in northern dialects undergo asynchronic pronunciation (asynchroniczna wymowa spółgłosek wargowych miękkich), whereby the palatal element changes into a different spirant, and the labial does not lose its palatalness, e.g. Masurian zrobzić (standard zrobic). The degree of asynchronicness may vary, sometimes realized as j, sometimes as [x]/[ɣ], sometimes [ɕ]/[ʑ]; see various articles on Polish dialects for details. Hypercorrections of this may also occur when trying to avoid this, for example in Kurpie psiec might be changes to [pʲxʲɛs], but ⟨psie⟩ (standard locative/vocative singular of pies) might be changes to [pʲxʲɛ]. Villages with two or even three types of palatal realizations might be mixed together, making the drawing of borders difficult; it also happens that the villages of the provincial nobility have a pronunciation that is closer to the pronunciation of the educated classes, so they have, for example, the type [pʲj bʲj], and the neighboring peasant has [pʲxʲ] [bʲɣʲ]. Asynchronic pronunciation can also be heard word-finally, except in the imperative.

==== Proto-Slavic *t *d and the rise of t́ d́, later ć dź ====
t continues unchanged, e.g. trzy < *trьje.

d remains unchanged, except word-finally or before voiceless consonants, e.g. dobry < *dobrъ, niewód (pronounced niewut) < *nevodъ, słodki < *soldъkъ (pronounced słotki).

If *t *d were near a front consonant, they palatalized to *t́ *d́ (/tʲ/ /dʲ/) and later develop to ć dź, e.g. ciec < *teťi, ciało < *tělo, cichy < *tixъ, dziesięć < *desętь, dziad < *dědъ dzień < *dьnь. The periodization of this change is placed beginning in the 12th century and ending in the 13th century along with ś and ź. dź word-finally and before a voiceless consonant becomes ć, and ć before voiced consonants becomes dź.

If t́ d́ were before r rz (< *ŕ) n ń after the loss of yers, they hardened, e.g. drę < *dьrǫ (first person singular of drzeć < *derti), drze < *dьretь (third person singular of drzeć < *derti), we dnie < vъ *dьne trę < *tьrǫ (first person singular of trzeć < *terti), trze < *tьretь (third person singular of trzeć < *terti), tnę < *tьnǫ (first person singular of ciąć < *tęti), tnie < *tьnetь (third person singular of ciąć < *tęti), piętnaście < *pętь na desęte. In the imperative before a soft or hard consonant, before which original i occurred or word-finally of these forms after the loss of -i: wróć, gryź; ć and dź assimilate in terms of voicing; final -dź becomes ć.

If t́ occurred before c after the loss of *ь, then it changed to ć, and then the resulting ćc in the 15th century changed to jc, in other words ćc > jcc > jc, e.g. winowajca, kojca, ojca; d́ in the same position loses its voicing and then changes the same way: rajca, zdrajca. Old Polish forms such as otca, otczyzna suggest a loss of palatalization in the cluster, unless they were spelled under Czech influence, but this would be a dialectal development. In later Polish, -jc- is partially kept by tradition, e.g. winowajca, zdrajca, ogrojca, ogrojcu, kojca, kojcem, the latter examples even change their nominative via leveling, from kociec ogrodziec > kojec ogrojec, and morphological innovations sometimes replace inherited forms, e.g. władca radca świętokradca; fluctuations are visible: władzca radzca.

t́ d́ in the groups st́ zd́ after the loss of *ь before s develop uniquely: *st́s > *śt́s > śćs > śs > jss > js; *zd́z first devoiced to *st́s and then had the same development: miejski < mieśćski. In the nominative plural of the masculine personal passive participle of several -ę, -esz verbs with t d stems have c dz instead of the expected ć dź due to dissimilation: gnieceni, pleceni, uwidzeni, pobodzeni, but gnieciony, gniecione. Gerunds of the same type of verbs also show this: gniecenie, uwidzenie, etc.

==== Proto-Slavic *tj *dj ====
tj dj originally gave c' dz' (/t͡sʲ/, /d͡zʲ/), and by the middle of the 16th century these had hardened to c, dz (/t͡s/, /d͡z/), but are morphophonologically soft, giving the alternations t : c : ć (światło : świeca : świecic), d : dz : dź (rada : radzę : radzie). See also § Proto-Slavic *ť *ď.

Proto-Slavic *stj *zdj give szcz żdż, e.g. goszczę < *gosťǫ (first person singular of gościć < *gostiti), jeżdżę < *jězďǫ (first person singular of jeździć < *ězditi).

==== Proto-Slavic *ť *ď ====
Proto-Slavic *ť *ď are inherited in Old Polish as /t͡sʲ/ /d͡zʲ/, spelled ⟨c⟩ ⟨dz⟩ and dz word finally becomes c: pieniądz. In the 15th century these were probably still pronounced with softening, and after their desoftening in the 16th century they become morphophonologically hardened in the alternations k : c : cz, e.g. ręka : ręce : rączka and g : dz : ż, e.g. noga : nodze : nożny. Thus the final development in Polish is c, dz, e.g. cały < *cělъ, cedzę < *cěďǫ (first person singular of cedzić < *cěditi). The form Polszcze was used until the 19th century - this is probably the result of an archaic exchange of Proto-Slavic *sk before *ě, which change to *šc and later *šč; therefore the form Polsce is from leveling with forms like ręce, matce, where *k + *ě of gives c. Polszcze can still be heard regionally. See also § Proto-Slavic *tj *dj.

==== Proto-Slavic *k *g ====
k and g remain unchanged, and word-finally and before a voiceless consonant changes to k, e.g. kara < *kara, głód < *goldъ, bóg (pronounced buk) < *bogъ.

Proto-Slavic *ky *gy become [kʲi] [gʲi] in the Middle Ages, e.g. kisnąć < *kysnǫti, gibki < *gybъkъ, and the clusters *kъ *gъ initially gave ke ge, and later in the 15th century softened to [kʲɛ] [gʲɛ], e.g. kieł < *kъlъ, giez < *gъzъ; this process is sometimes called the fourth palatalization. These initially are not phonemes, as their occurrence is conditioned, and Parkoszowic does not differentiate the two; Steiber claims they phonemicize in the 17th century with the denasalization of final -ę, with potential minimal pairs such as drogę ([droɡɛ]) and drogie ([droɡʲɛ]), but also says that the difference is small and calls them "facultative phonemes" (fonemami fakultatywnymi).

kt in early Polish and in dialects simplifies to cht, e.g. chto < kto, and gd changes to [ɣd], and most often further to d, e.g. kiedy < Old Polish kiegdy < *kogъda.

Some dialects neighboring Kashubian, namely Tuchola Forest dialect, and the western Krajna dialect historically further softened [kʲi] [kʲɛ] [gʲi] [gʲɛ] to ci dzi, e.g. dzipci (/’d͡ʑipt͡ɕi/) (standard gibki).

==== Proto-Slavic *v and the rise of f as well as v́ and f́ ====
v, written in Polish as w, remains unchanged, except word-finally or before a voiceless consonant or notably after a voiceless consonant it becomes f, e.g. woda < *voda, staw (pronounced staf) < *stavъ, wczoraj < Old Polish wczoraj < *vьčera. The change of v to f after a voiceless consonant began at the latest in the 12th century, which is indirectly shown by the fact that in Lesser Polish and Masovian dialects the cluster chv changed to f as early as the 13th century, which suggests and earlier chf, e.g. chwała > Old Polish fała, and notably some dialects kept voiced w even after voiceless consonants, and others yet have a semivowel realization of /w/.

In relation to these processes is the phonemization of f, as **f was not part of Proto-Slavic, and early borrowings replace f with p, such as the Old Polish Szczepan from Latin Stephanus. The early dialectal change of chv > f led to minimal pairs like falić vs walić, seen in the beginning of the 13th century. Later borrowings starting from the 14th and 15th century show the presence of f in; folwark||forwark, flak, facelet, farba (next to older barwa), forszt, fryjować, frywołt.

f has a unique origin in the word ufać and related words, as it was originally upwać, containing the prefix o- and the stem -pw-, related to pewny, and this cluster later simplified; compare obfity below.

If v was near a front consonant or j, it palatalized, later phonemicizing to v́ after Lechitic umlaut:

1. Before a vowel v́ > v́ (no change), e.g. wiara < *věra, wieczór < *večerъ, wilk < *vьlkъ. Epenthetic ľ from vj was lost like *pľ *bľ: Old Polish dawię < *davľǫ (first person singular of dawić < daviti), mówię < *mъlvľǫ (first person singular of mówić < mъlviti); niemowlę is an exception next to Old Polish niemowię, which is likely the result of Ruthenian influence;
2. v́ after the loss of *ь or *i of the old first and second person plural imperative -imy, -icie before a consonant loses its softness, and if that consonant is voiceless, it assimilates and devoices: owca (pronounced ofca) < *ovьca, mówcie (pronounced mufcie) < Old Polish mówicie;
3. v́ after the loss of *ь or the 2nd person singular ending of the imperative -i in word-finally loses its softness and voicing: krew (pronounced krew), mów (pronounced muf);
4. vj after the loss of *ь word-finally loses its softness and voicing: Jarosław (pronounced Jarosłaf) - this phonetic loss of softness happened during the Middle Polish era, but was sometimes written orthographically;
5. v́ after a voiceless consonant changes to f́: chwila ([xfʲila]);

f́ was not originally a phoneme for the same reasons as f, but became one alongside f before the beginning of the 13th century, and f́ can be seen in loanwords from e.g. the 14th and 15th centuries: fig(a), fiołek, firletka.

f́ has a unique origin in the word obfity, as it was originally opłwity, which has the prefix o-, the suffix -ity, and the stem -płw-, related to pływać, płynąć, pławić, thus meaning “swimming in something”; compare ufać above.

v́ f́ have an asynchronic pronunciation like ṕ b́ in Northern Poland, sometimes as [vʲʑ] [fʲɕ], or [vʲj] [fʲj], or [vʲɣʲ] [fʲxʲ]; the geographic spread of these variants is like that of ṕ b́. For v́ f́, the labial component may be lost entirely, giving just [ɣʲ] [xʲ] or [ʑ] [ɕ]. The spirant resulting from the loss of the labial is never equal to standard Polish /j/, except in the dative ending -owi, as well as the suffixes -owi- -ewi-, thus konoju, Skierniejice, Rojiska.

The clusters śv́ śf́ in dialects develop differently - rather than decomposing, the labial hardens, but the soft sibilant remains, so śfat, ćwyrć. Pronunciations such as [ɕxʲat] occur, but are less frequent.

==== Proto-Slavic *s *z and the rise of ś ź ====
s remains generally unchanged, but before a soft consonant or as a prefix before ć can also undergo softening; skok < *skokъ, śmierć < *sъmьrtь, ściąć > *sъtęti, but spiąć > *sъpęti. In older forms of Polish and now in dialects it can soften in other positions.

z remains unchanged, but word-finally and before a voiceless consonants changes to s, e.g. zając < *zajęcь, guz (pronounced gus) < *guzъ, rozpamiętać (pronounced rospamiętać) < pamiętać. z can also soften before a soft consonant and as a prefix before dź, e.g. gwóźdź < *gvozdь, zdziałać (pronounced ździałać) < działać. In older forms of Polish and dialects z is ź before other soft consonants. z changes to dz exceptionally in dzwon and bardzo, still realized as barzo in the 17th century.

If *s *z were near a front consonant, they palatalized to *ś *ź (initially /sʲ/ /zʲ/), then fully soften to /ɕ/ /ʑ/ beginning in the 12th century and ending in the 13th century along with ć and dź. Softness remains with few exceptions:

1. Before a front vowel: siec < *sěťi, się < *sę, sidło < *sidlo, ziemia < *zemľa, zima < *zima, ziębić < *zębiti;
2. Before a back vowels that exists as the result of umlaut or the development of [æ̃]: sąsiad < *sǫsědъ, siostra < *sestra, siąknąć < *sęknǫti, zioło < *zelo;
3. Word-finally after the loss of *ь: oś < *osь, gałąź < *galǫzь;
4. Word-medially before a soft consonant after the loss of *ь: w ośle, w koźle, głośni, groźnie, prośbie, groźbie;
5. Word-medially before a hard consonant after the loss of *ь:, prośba < *prosьba, głośny < *golsьnъ, groźny < *grozьnъ, kośca < kosiec. ś ź desoften in a few cases: pismo < *pisьmo, osła (from osioł), kozła (from kozioł). Words like żałosny miłosny have an s resulting from the § Simplification of consonant clusters;
6. In the imperative before a soft or hard consonant, before which original i occurred or word-finally of these forms after the loss of -i: gróź, proś, gróźcie, proście, gróźmy, prośmy.

ś and ź assimilate in terms of voicing; final -ź becomes ś.

==== Proto-Slavic *š *ž ====
Proto-Slavic *ś̌ *ź̌ entered Polish, now spelled ⟨sz⟩ ⟨ż⟩, originally as /ʃʲ/ /ʒʲ/ through the 15th centuries, and by the middle of the 16th century desoften to /ʂ/ /ʐ/, but remained morphophonologically soft seen in the alternations ch : sz as well as s : sz and g : ż as well as z : ż, e.g. mucha : musze, pisać : piszę, rogal : rożek, mażę : mazać. Reflexes include szyć < *šiti, dusza < *duša, kosz < *košь, żal < * žalь. ż word-finally and before voiceless consonants phonetically changes to sz, e.g. mąż (pronounced mąsz) < *mǫžь.

Sometimes sz ż correspond to foreign s z in loanwords: msza, nieszpory, koszula, Tadeusz; żegnać, żagiel, Old Polish żemła.

Older sz changes to ś in the nominative plural ending of nouns, adjectives, numerals, and pronouns of the masculine personal gender: Włosi, głusi, starsi, pierwsi, nasi - this occurred in the 17th century based on morphological and morphophonological leveling, as the typical nominative masculine personal ending became -i with softening of the previous consonant: sąsiedzi, kaci, chłopi, młodzi, łysi, grubi, tępi, and this also encompassed sz ż, but not always consistently, as one typically sees duży || duzi but not boży||bozi, świeży||świezi.

Proto-Slavic *zž, resulting from older *zǯ́ which continue original *zg+j as well as *zdj gives Polish żdż, which phonetically changes to szcz due to word-final devoicing or assimilation. A change of zż to żdż also occurs near the prefix z- with original ż, but not secondary, in the onset of the stem if the original two consonants were separated by a yer: żdżegł < zżegł, żdżyć < zżyć, Żdżary < zżary. Proto-Slavic *sč, which continue original *sk+j as well as *stj gives szcz, e.g. piszczę < *piščǫ < *piskjǫ (first person singular of piskać, piszczeć < *piskati).

==== Proto-Slavic *x and Polish ch́ ====
Proto-Slavic *x remains in Polish unchanged, spelled as ⟨ch⟩, e.g. chleb < *xlěbъ.

The words Chryst(us), chrzest, chrześcijanin, chrzcić, and chrosta originally and dialectically have k, which changed to ch near r rz.

In Lesser Poland and Masovia chv- and chv́- change to f, f́, fała, fila, fiać, see § Proto-Slavic *v and the rise of Polish f and § Proto-Slavic *v́ *vj and the rise of Polish f́.

Before a voiced consonant ch phonetically becomes [ɣ]: klechda ([klɛɣda]); this consonant is near [ɦ] which occurs in Ruthenian, Czech, and Slovak Polish, e.g. hańba, hak, herbata, hołota, see articles on Polish dialects, however this is not a phoneme. [ɣ] or [ɦ] occurs sometimes via prothesis or foreign influence (e.g. hańba instead of gańba), and in Borderlands and eastern dialects it may be considered a phoneme of foreign influence.

ch in Lesser Polish dialects is very weak and intervocalically is barely audible, thus subsequently it was lost in the placename Sudoł (<*Suodoł < *Suchodoł). Word finally there was a potential for -ch to be lost, but this would lead to morphological complications, such as forms like nogach becoming noga, robiłach becoming robiła; consequently Lesser Poland final -ch was strengthened to -k, see Lesser Poland dialect group. This change originally occurred in all of Lesser Poland, but is being lost under influence of standard Polish and now occurs only in parts of Lesser Poland. This pronunciation fades the most quickly when -ch is the final consonant of the stem and not an inflectional ending, meaning it appears before a vowel before inflectional endings, thus na nogak, na rękak but ruch, dach, groch; stem-final -k is heard now in Goral dialects. The change of final -ch > -k is also seen in parts of Silesia around Pszczyna and Stalinogród, but this is not a Silesian innovation, but Lesser Polish influence. In Spisz and around Nowy Targ final -ch becomes not -k but -f, so na nogaf, posłaf, zrobiłef; places with -ch > -k preserve place of articulation, -ch > -f preserve manner of articulation. The earliest attestations of this change can be seen in the 15th and 16th centuries; it is controversial whether the phenomenon was just emerging at that time and reached its full intensity in the 17th century, or whether it had already flourished then and even earlier, but because this phenomenon encompasses both Silesia and Lesser Poland, it is probable that this began in earlier eras. Finally Masovian influences on eastern and northern Lesser Poland reintroduced final -ch.

The Proto-Slavic cluster *chy is generally kept without change, e.g. chyba < *xyba, chylić < *xyliti, and early borrowings in Old Polish with [xi] or [hi] are changed to chy. [xʲ] entered Polish at the latest in the 18th century in loanwords such as Chiny, historia, Hipolit, hipokryzja, as borrowings originally had chy, hy, like chyża, hydra, hymn, and that [xʲ] entered Polish under the influence of German, Italian, and French and then appeared in the 19th century and then only exceptionally in iterative forms such as wysłuchiwać, podkochiwać as well as their derivatives, however soft ch́ remains not a phoneme. che remains in native words without change: uchem, duchem, rozchełstać, chełpić się, chełm, and foreign che, he are also kept: chemia, cherubin, herezja, herbata. However foreign hie is adopted as [xʲjɛ], e.g. hierarchia, hierarchy, attested since the beginning of the 17th century, Hieronim, hieroglif, hiena. This is the second Polish innovation of soft [xʲ], meaning that [xʲ] is a Middle Polish innovation which entered Polish via loanwords.

==== Proto-Slavic *j ====
Word-initially and word-finally j is kept without changes, e.g. jałowy < *jalovъ.

Sometimes -j was added word finally, namely in dzisiaj, wczoraj, tutaj, indziej, trzej, dwaj, obaj, chociaj, dalej, więcej; the origin of this -j is various and not explained, particularly with regard to dzisiaj, wczoraj, tutaj, indziej.

In trzej < trzé < *trьje it could have come from a diphthongal pronunciation of é, that is /ei/, and then by analogy to the numeral dwaj, obaj, czterej, see declension of numerals;

As for the comparative of adverbs, one can assume that in the earliest periods of Polish there were two types:

1. więcej, krótce, dale, niże, created with the suffix *-je;
2. nowieje, starzeje < *nověje, *starěje, created with the suffix *-ěje.

Within the second type, contraction could have occurred: *-ěje > -é and then >-ej like trzej, or there was a shortening of *-ěje > *-ěj > -ej; then this -ej begins to spread to other comparatives in the 15th century via leveling. This also could have affected the comparative of adjectives such as ładniejszy, głośniejszy, chytrzejszy via analogy.

The presence of the alternation of the superlative naj-||naj- is inherited from Proto-Slavic, where it was probably a conflation of two prefixes. In the Middle Ages na- was used in Lesser Poland and Greater Poland; the appearance of naj- in the translations of psalters is from Czech influence; in the 16th century na- sees more use, only in the 17th century the Masovian prefix naj- comes to dominate, possibly under influence of Ukrainian influence Ruthenian nobility.

In Old Polish and in dialectal prothetic initial j- can be seen: Jadam, Jarnold, jamroz, Jewa, and dialectically jucho, judo.

==== Proto-Slavic *č ====
Proto-Slavic *č is inherited into as Old Polish /t͡ʃʲ/, spelled ⟨cz⟩, and remains this way until the middle of the 16th century, the desoftening of sz ż, when it desoftened becoming a morphophonologically hardened consonant in the alternations k : c : cz, e.g. ręka : ręce : ręcznik. Inherited examples include czoło < *čelo, czas < *časъ. Forms with original czrz- change in Middle Polish to trz-, thus czrzemcha > trzemcha; czrześnia > trześnia; czrzewa > trzewa; czrzem > trzem; czrzoda > trzoda; czrzop > trzop; see also § Proto-Slavic diphthongs *or *ol *er *el. This happened because cz is a fricative containing /ʂ/, and ⟨rz⟩ (see § Proto-Slavic *r *ŕ *rj became /ʐ~ʂ/ in Middle Polish, meaning that /ʂ/ occurred twice, thus /t͡ʂr̝ɛmxa/ > /t͡ʂʂɛmxa/ > /t͡ʂɛmxa/, meaning that the /ʂ/ in cz was lost, leaving only /t/.

cz becomes dż before voiced consonants: liczba (pronounced lidżba).

==== Further development of sibilants and affricates ====
Many dialects merge the series of sibilants and affricates in various ways; mazuration, also sometimes called in Polish sakanie, is the merger of sz ż cz dż with s z c dz (notably /ʐ/ /ʂ/ from rz is unaffected) and is considered an extreme form of depalatalization; jabłonkowanie, also called siakanie, is the merger sz ż cz dż with ś ź ć dź, often realized respectively as /ʃ/ /ʒ/ /t͡ʃ/ /d͡ʒ/; finally kaszubienie is the merger of ś ź ć dź with s z c dz.

These mergers often occur outside of the regions they were named for - mazuration happens in most of Masovia, Lesser Poland part of Silesia, and small islands in Greater Poland, which otherwise does not merge anything; jabłonkowanie occurs in Silesia near Jabłonków and parts of Masovia; except kaszubienie, which occurs in Pomeranian.

The cause and age of mazuration are unknown - some scholars consider it to be a prehistoric development from the 10th-11th centuries, some consider it a later development, as late as the 15th century; some consider the cause to be the result of foreign substrate, namely Finnish, Prussian, Celtic, and others to be independent, i.e. the result of difficulties distinguishing s š ś, and notably such difficulties can be observed in young children.

The chronology of mazuration is tied with the rise of the literary standard - if mazuration is old, then the literary standard would have arisen from non-mazurising Greater Poland, but if it is young, from the 14th-15th centuries, there is no specific reason to associate the standard with Greater Poland.

Jabłonkowanie is the result of mixing of people groups - in the north the Polish population had contact with mazurising groups as well as non-mazurising groups where remnants of the Old Prussian population could have still been, who had neither mazuration nor ś ź ć dź; in the South, in the Beskids, two Polish colonizational groups collided, the mazurising group from Lesser Poland and the non-mazurising group from Silesia, as well as Slovak peasants without mazuration, but with ś ź ć dź. It is impossible to tell if foreign influence or the mixing of two native groups speaking differently was more important - perhaps the foreign influence, as mazurising and non-mazurising groups met elsewhere and similar mergers did not happen.

==== Proto-Slavic *r *ŕ *rj ====
r is kept without change, e.g. raz < *razъ.

ŕ rj and r before a front vowel have the same development in Polish, written ⟨rz⟩, and the prehistoric and early literate realization was probably /r̝/, as it was often written with ⟨r⟩, such as in Bull of Gniezno; in the 13th century the spellings ⟨rs⟩, ⟨rsz⟩, ⟨rz⟩ begin to see use, suggesting a change in pronunciation where the softness of /r̝/ changed to a more fricative realization, probably /r͡ʒ/ (or phonetically /r͡ʂ/ after a voiceless consonant. It is possible this realization began as a dialectal feature of Masovia that spread along with its spelling over the 14th century, when some old documents such as the Holy Cross Sermons still used the spelling ⟨r⟩, or from Greater Poland in the 15th century. rz lost its softness probably only during the 16th century, see § Proto-Slavic *ś̌ *ź̌ and § Proto-Slavic *ć̌, and continued as /r͡ʐ/ during the 16th and 17th centuries; this is reflected in orthography, as even in manuscripts, which were less careful in terms of spelling, never used rz for ż like what might happen in modern Polish. Further evidence is that rz and ż do not rhyme at this time, but on the contrary rhymes such as dzierży - szerzy are attested. Mesgnien (1649) writes that “rz is pronounced harder and with a certain scraping (durius et cum stridore quodam), which is difficult to explain without the model of a teacher.” Over the course of the Middle Polish era rz slowly loses its rolled r element and the fricative ż becomes more and more prominent, and by the 18th century ultimately merges with ż. The ż realization is seen exceptionally in the 15th century (1410), in Rej's works, and with faux mazuration in the work Peregrynacja Maćkowa from 1612, notable as /ʒ/ didn't change to /z/ later. Examples of inherited rz include rzeka < *rěka, burza < *buřa.

The realization of rz differs in some dialects, where the rolled r element is often kept, see articles on various dialects of Polish; it is also kept somewhat in Kashubian and Slovincian, but this realization is giving way to ż everywhere. This change of /r͡ʐ/ > /ʐ/ results in the reintroduction of /ʐ/ into masurizing dialects. The masuration of rz occurs exceptionally along the line of contact between masurising and non-masurising dialects, among polonized Germans, or in heavily Germanized Poles.

rz word-finally or before a voiceless consonant loses voicing and sounds like sz; rz also loses voicing after a voiceless consonant like w. This progressive assimilation, as opposed to typical regressive assimilation found in other consonant clusters, is explained by the fact that that old voiced /r͡ʐ/ and voiceless /r͡ʂ/ were allophones and did not create any minimal pairs, but if a voiceless consonant assimilated in voicing to /r͡ʐ/ then it would have to merge with another phoneme, which would cause confusion, e.g. trze would sound like drze, krze like grze, krzywa like grzywa, krzep like grzeb, trzewa like grzewa.

If rz occurred before ł l ĺ c s it lost its softness and became r: orła, w orle, orli, but orzeł, starca, but starzec, twórca but tworzyć, cesarstwo but cesarz. In standard Polish rz becomes r also before n ń: wierny, wierni, piernik, but in Old Polish rz can be seen: srzebrzne, knąbrzny, knąbrznie; the modern Polish powietrzny, wietrznie, Jaworzno, Jaworznie etc. are the result of mixing and leveling forms with *rьn that gave rn and *rьń which gave rzń.

Old *sŕ occurred as śrz until the middle of the 15th century, after which śr can be seen in Lesser Poland and Masovia, which dominates in Lesser Poland and Masovia in the first half of the 16th and in Greater Poland old śrz dominates at this time. Since the middle of the 16th century, the spelling śrz is established in prints, so śrzoda, śrzodek, pośrzód, pośrzatnąć as the result of Greater Polish dialectal influence; then around 1820 the spelling śr starts to spread under the influence of Masovian after Warsaw became the capital.

Old *zŕ was kept as źrz until the middle of the 15th century; in the first half of the 16th century in Lesser Poland as źr, in Greater Poland as źrz as jrz, and in Masovia as źr and jrz. From the middle of the 16th century the spellings źrz jźrz (jrz) dominate in texts from Greater Poland dialectal influence and at the end of the first quarter of the 19th century the forms źr jrz spread in the standard due to Masovian influence for the same reason as above.

In parts of Lesser Polish śr źr underwent metathesis, giving rśoda, rśode, rźůdło, rźeb́e, dorźały, sporźał, sometimes with hardening, e.g. wyrze, sporzá; metathesis isn't equally spread out in all words in this area. This phenomenon is very old, with forms like w posriodku, we rsiodę attested in the 16th century. In Silesia and Kashubia the development was more or less the same with epenthetic t d giving strz zdrz: strzoda, strzybło, uzdrzeć, zdrzudło; Greater Poland most often has the form śrz źrz, but in areas strz and zdrz are possible; Lesser Poland shows śr źr or sometimes metathesizes to rś rź; Masovia has śr źr. Other variants are possible where środa and źródło did not come to dominate.

==== Proto-Slavic *l *ĺ *lj ====
Proto-Slavic *l was originally inherited as a dental lateral liquid /ɫ/, written as ⟨ł⟩, and over the course of the 16th and 17th centuries, completing in the 19th and 20th centuries, it became in most places /w/ through a process called wałczenie; the earliest attestations of this come from 1588 from acts from the Kraków archive with the spellings putora, putrzeci; traces of it from the 15th and 17th century in Lesser Poland, second half of the 17th century in Masovia, and the second half of the 17th century in Greater Poland can be seen. Kochanowski calls ł “foreign” (barbarum), probably in reference to /w/, and that it was seen as strikingly different from /ɫ/, and wałczenie can also be seen at the beginning of the 17th century in Perygrynacja Maćkowa from 1612: okoo||około, psezegnau (przeżegnał), poutory||półtora. The realization /w/ spread far in the 19th and 20th centuries, and dental /ɫ/ remains in many places around Poland, particularly on the intersection of Poland and Belarus, Ukraine, or Czechia. Inherited examples include łąd < *ladъ, łeb < *lъbъ.

Proto-Slavic *ĺ *lj have the same reflexes within Polish as does *l before a front vowel, written as ⟨l⟩. Before i it undergoes palatalization as [lʲ]; it has this realization during the Middle Ages in all other positions as well, somewhat in the 16th century, and then later became [l], while still acting morphophonologically soft. Inherited examples include lipa < *lipa, myśl < *myslь.

In Greater Poland, Silesia, and large parts of Lesser Poland l before i is [lʲ]; in Masovia however it is pronounced the same as before other vowels, and in dialects differentiating y from i the realization is therefore ly; this can also occur in neighboring dialects experiencing influence from Masovia.

==== Proto-Slavic *m, and the rise of ḿ ====
Proto-Slavic *m continues unchanged, e.g. mak < *makъ.

If m was near a front consonant or j, it palatalized, later phonemicizing to ḿ after Lechitic umlaut:, e.g. miedza < *meďa, karmię < *kъrmľǫ (first person singular of karmić < *kъrmiti). Word-final or preconsonantal ḿ hardens to m, e.g. dam < *damь (first person singular of dać < *dati), kłamstwo < *klamьstvo. The hardening of ḿ occurred probably by the end of the 16th century, as Roter in 1616 states that this realization in this position is rare and exceptional, but some place its end in the New Polish era. See also § Proto-Slavic *v́ *vj and the rise of Polish f́.

Soft /mʲ/ in northern Poland decomposes either to mj or mń, as other soft labials, see § Proto-Slavic *v́ *vj and the rise of Polish f́, and words with the etymological cluster mń sometimes undergo hypercorrection, e.g. miejszy (standard mniejszy), suggesting a conscious awareness of mń being a proscribed pronunciation. In dialects with [ɣʲino] [oxʲara] or zino osiara (standard wino ofiara) the labial element completely disappears leaving just ń: niasto, zienia (ziemia), kanień (kamień); elsewhere the shift of ḿ > ń is limited to positions after consonants: śniérć (śmierć), śniga (śmiga), jęcznień (jęczmień), but mniasto, kamnień, ziemnia. This change of ḿ > mń or ḿ > ń sometimes results in mń in place of ń: mnisko (nisko), mnitka (nitka), mniecka (niecka), but only in the first syllable, so words like kuźnia, tani do not change; ń in place of ḿ may also occur: miecka, mitka, śmiádanie; this change of ń > ḿ is likely the result of hypercorrection. Pronunciations such as kanień, na kaniéniu were proscribed in Kopczyński's brochure Poprawa błędów (1808), which was aimed at upper levels of society, not peasants, meaning that even elite sometimes had this pronunciation. Soft ḿ behaves particularly interestingly in the nominative plural ending -ami as well as the pronominal clitics mi, mię in that within these the soft labial often depalatalizes, giving forms like rękamy, nogamy, (daj) my, (uderzył) me/(uderzył) ma, in other regions pronunciations such as both nogami (with soft m), mi alongside niasto and nogani can be heard.

==== Proto-Slavic *n *ń *nj ====
Proto-Slavic *n remains unchanged, e.g. noga < *noga.

Proto Slavic *ń *nj and *n before a front vowel have common reflexes in Polish as ń, e.g. nieść < *nesti, koń < *koňь. If ń occurred before ń or n due to the loss of *ь, it changed to n: konny< *konьnъ, konnica < *konьnica. In the first half of the 13th century, ń in ksiądz, ksieni, księga, and related words changed to ś as the result of dissimilation of two nasal phones ń - ę or ń - ń, that is ń lost its nasality but kept its palatal pronunciation, which after voiceless k became ś; the word knieja however remains unchanged.

==== Prothesis ====
Polish inherits many prothetic Proto-Slavic forms, including *j- before front vowels and before the back vowels *a *u in a few words, *v- before the back vowels *ъ *y and sometimes *o and *ǫ. In the Old and Middle Polish era, the prothetic consonants /j/ before i, e and sometimes a, rarely /v/ before o, a, very frequently /ɣ~ɦ/ before e, i, u, o and unmarked /w/ before o and sometimes u (now written ô û) can be seen in texts from the 14th, 15th, and 16th centuries.

==== Simplifications of consonant clusters ====
Due to the loss of weak yers many consonants came into contact with one another and within these clusters tendencies of phonetic assimilation occurred based on place of articulation, softness, and sometimes the total loss of a consonant occurred resulting in the simplification of these clusters, namely:

1. *žьs > s: boski, męstwo;
2. *šьs > s: włoski, suski;
3. *sьs > s: ruski, niebieski;
4. *zьs > s: łaski (from Łazy);
5. *dьs > c (orthographipcally dz): ludzki, sąsiedztwo;
6. *tьs > c: kącki, bogactwo;
7. *čьs > c: świadectwo, co (from *ć̌ьso);
8. *zdьn > zn: Gniezno, próżny (Old Polish prózny);
9. stn > sn: miłosny, żałosny, szesnaście;
10. rdn > rn: miłosierny;
11. rdc > rc: serce;
12. *rv > r: topьrvo
13. *stьl > śl: jeśli;
14. *slьs > s: przemyski;
15. *pъv > f in ufać and related words;
16. *xv > x: chory
17. xv > f: fała (see § Proto-Slavic *v and the rise of f as well as v́ and f́);
18. łdn > łn: żołnierz (Old Polish żołdnierz and compare modern żołd);
19. stb > zb: izba;

== Inflection ==
Two tendencies within the historic development of inflection occur: 1) inflectional endings undergo the above discussed phonetic changes, 2) a reduction in the number of inflectional paradigms via analogical leveling and supported by phonetic changes. In terms of number, Polish gradually lost the dual seen in nouns, adjectives, pronouns, and verbs.

=== Nouns ===
Closely connected to the declension of nouns is grammatical gender and the morphologization of it, that is gender being determined by the ending. Polish inherits morphologized gender from Proto-Slavic replacing thematic declension, for example in the neuter, but also later demorphologizes its endings, that is spreading certain endings regardless of gender, for example -om in the dative plural displacing feminine -am, -ami in the instrumental plural spreading from feminine declension, and -ach in the locative plural also spreading from feminine declension. Polish declension also underwent semanticization, that is changing under influence of the meaning of the word, seen in the use of genitive for accusative among masculine animate nouns. Polish further develops this by innovating its modern three-way split of animacy, masculine personal, masculine animal, and masculine inanimate in the New Polish era. Other examples include full declension of words like to państwo "this nation", te państwa "these nations" versus defective declension like ci państwo "this husband and wife" and the differentiation of proper nouns, e.g. mech : mchu but Mech : Mechu.

Polish also makes changes to its inherited grammatical number system seen in the loss of the dual number, replacing it with the plural, however traces of the dual can be seen in some irregular declension of body parts naturally occurring in pairs (rękoma w ręku, oczy but oka in other meanings, uszy but ucha in other meanings) and fossilized phrases (mądrej głowie dość dwie słowie). Polish also has plurale tantum and singulare tantum nouns. Finally Polish see suppletion, considered a newer development.

In terms of nominal case, Polish inherits the seven cases seen in Proto-Slavic: the nominative, genitive, dative, accusative, instrumental, locative, and vocative case.

==== Declension of masculine nouns ====
Masculine nouns come from Proto-Slavic *-o-, *-jo-, *-u-, *-i-, and *-n- stem nouns.

In Polish *-n stems in the nominative singular were replaced with the accusative: kamień, płomień. In other types the nominative inherits: -∅ after the loss of yers, but the presence of *-ъ, *-ь can be seen in the final consonant of the stem: hard or soft or sometimes functionally soft: róz, wóz, syn, wół, gość, koń, mąż, gołąb (< *gołąb́). A Polish innovation among this is within masculine soft-stem nouns, that is the hardening of final soft labials (see § Proto-Slavic *p *b and the rise of *ṕ *b́, § Proto-Slavic *v and the rise of f as well as v́ and f́, and § Proto-Slavic *m, and the rise of ḿ) and the phonological hardening of historically soft sz ż cz dż, which remain morphologically soft. The new shape of the nominative, which is the result of the loss of weak final yers, is a stem ending in a consonant, and plays a prominent role in the leveling reshapings and through this the original differentiation of *-o/*-u stems ending in *-ъ and *-jo/*-i stems ending in -ь is blurred. The original opposition of *ъ : *ь was morphologically more distinct than the new opposition of hard and soft final consonants in the stem and through this masculine nouns gain another similarity to each other beyond being masculine by having a suffixless stem; this change also influences oblique cases.

The genitive singular is an example of leveling and mixing of declensional paradigm, a process which began centuries ago and continues now. The vast majority of Proto-Slavic masculine nouns were *-o and *-jo stems and used the genitive ending *-a; the few *-u stems that existed took the genitive singular ending *-u. It is possible that already in the Proto-Slavic stage the genitive ending *-u began to see use in old *-o stems and this tendency extended to *-o and *-jo stems in preliterate Polish; this can be seen in Middle Ages Polish and still before the 16th century in that many *-o stem nouns took the original old suffix -a and also -u, e.g. wschoda||wschodu and -a can still be seen in the 16th century, e.g. pokoja. Comparing genitive forms over the course of Old Polish and 16th century Polish shows a gradual replacement of -a with -u, and the use of -a became limited depending on the meaning of the noun in the 16th century and -u becomes the dominant ending in 15-16th centuries. Animate nouns use -a and inanimate nouns use -u, but there is much fluctuation, especially when in a rhyming position, where archaic forms may occur, e.g. człowieka - do wieka but od wieku - człowieku (Kochanowski); this tendency can be seen today, e.g. fotela||fotelu. In modern Standard Polish -a is used for, among others, animate nouns, diminutives, body parts, dishes/vessels, tools, measures, measures of weight, coins, games, dances, magazines, and months whereas -u is predominately used for inanimate nouns, loanwords, mental nouns, collective nouns, material nouns, and the days of the week, as well as abbreviations; there are of course exceptions and words where both endings may be possible, or both occur but are semantics-dependent, e.g. przypadku "accident" versus przypadka "grammatical case", geniuszu "genius as a quality" versus geniusza "genius as a person". Old -u stem nouns often take -a due to leveling, like syna, oćca, ducha. Original *-i and *-n stem nouns generally take -a, and Masovian and Greater Polish old texts sometimes show -e, which is either the result of a dialectal pronunciation of a as e after j or after original j that softened the preceding consonant or potentially inherited, otherwise -i and -e of *-i- and *-n- stems were lost. Dialects also show fluctuation in the distribution of -u and -a; generally -a sees wider use in dialects and words where -u replaces -a are rare. Also within dialects mobile e within cases is lost, so mechu, besu, dechu.

The dative singular shows a similar tendency as the genitive: *-ovi from *-u stems begins to take over the function of -u that of *-o and *-jo stems; the cause for this is that -owi is more distinctive, as it is found only in the dative, and nouns where -u replaced -a also removed -u in the dative for -owi in order to avoid the ambiguity of -u.} -owi also becomes the ending for animate nouns, especially personal, perhaps under influence of etymological synowi. During the Old Polish and Middle Polish periods many originally *-o stem nouns kept -u, especially one-syllable words and nouns in a prepositional phrase with ku. Examples of both datives forms are attested in Old Polish: gniewu||gniewowi. In the 17th century -owi, used more in colloquial speech, spread to the standard and began to be used in the vast majority of words, and nouns whose genitive have -u also begin to take it, except bzu, tchu, snu, whereas nouns that had -a in the genitive except a few words, especially monosyllabic, kept -u: bratu, chłopu, księdzu, pani, ojcu, chłopcu. Place name ending in -ów kept traditional -u after ku: ku Krakowu, ku Tarnowu, ku Charkowu, but otherwise Krakowowi, Tarnowowi, Charkowowi without the preposition. In dialects -owi can be seen in place of literary -u: bratowi, księdzowi, panowi, psowi; especially in the north; also in the north the new ending -owiu dominates (sometimes pronounced -oju or -oziu from the decomposition of soft labials) as a compromise of the two suffixes. The ending Greater Polish and Masovian dialectal ending -ewi saw use until the 16th century; originally it only appears after soft and functionally soft consonants, and is an innovation based on an old alternation of *o : *je, e.g. *rabomъ : *konjemъ, *togo : *jego, but in Lesser Polish texts -owi dominates, with Masovia following this first and later Greater Poland, and -ewi generally stops seeing use in the 16th century, except some Greater Polish dialects, which retain this. In the 15th and 16th centuries -ewi sometimes saw use after hard consonants: obrazewi, głosewi. This ending still sees use in the Łowicz dialect. Around Sochaczew the realization -eju sees use, the result of combining -ewi and -u, like -owiu/-oju. *-i and *-n stem nouns since the earliest times have only a leveled ending -owi following original -i: gościowi, gołębiowi, kamieniowi, dniowi.

As a result of sound changes, namely the loss of yers, the accusative singular gained the ending -∅ and this remains the case for inanimate nouns to this day. Animate nouns, on the other hand, especially personal nouns, show a tendency to use the genitive for the accusative; this tendency must have spread in pre-historic Polish, as already in the 14th and 15th centuries the -∅ ending for animate nouns is seen exceptionally, and in the 16th century only for non-personal animate nouns; the -∅ ending remained the longest in Masovia. Within the 16th century, genitive for animate accusative became the exceptionless norm, with the exception of a few fossilizations: iść za mąż, być za pan brat, siąść na koń, na miły Bóg, na święty Mikołaj. This change was semanto-syntactically motivated, because if both the subject and object are animate nouns and had the same form and word order is loose, the meaning of the sentence is blurred, for example ociec widzi syn could mean either “the father sees the son” or “the son sees the father” and a difference in form helps clarify the meaning. In new Polish the use of genitive for accusative spread in some inanimate nouns, for examples the names of dances, games, money, cigarettes, and in some phrases. *-n stem nouns see the accustive spread to the nominative.

In historic Polish only -em sees use for the instrumental singular, within *-u, *-jo, *-i, and *-n stems this is the etymological form of *-emь, *-ъmь, and *-ьmь, where -e- is the result of the changing of strong yers or inherited. For *-o stems, the use of -em is the result of leveling, replacing *-omъ of *-o-, based on *-u stems; -em coming from -ъmь is seen in the hardness of the final stem consonant, and then this -em with a preceding hard consonant spread because all other stems also had the also had -em.

In the locative singular the inherited Proto-Slavic state remains within nouns - *-o stem nouns have -’e < *-ě, e.g. rodzie. Until the 16th century nouns whose stems ended in -k, -g, -ch took -e (< *-ě) showing softening of *k > c, *g > dz, *x > sz: człowiece, języce, zamętce, pagórce, obłoce, bodze, okrędze, strasze, grzesze, słusze; all other stems from the oldest times show a spreading of -u originally only used for *-u stems, and this ending also takes *-jo stems which only keep the original ending -i exceptionally (gaji, stolcy in the 14th century). Some *-i stem nouns also take it: gościu, gołębiu, and some *-n stem nouns: kamieniu, płomieniu, and only dzień to this day keeps its original ending *-e but only in the fossilized phrase we dnie (i w nocy), as otherwise its w dniu. -u even spread to *-o stem nouns, seen in some rare medieval forms such as sadu, ludu, czasu, baranu, however it remained only in velar nouns: ptaku, Bogu, duchu, replacing the old 16th century ending -’e: ptace, Bodze, dusze. The word pan is an exception taking -u, likely as a result of leveling in the set phrase panu Bogu. All *-u stem nouns except syn and dom took -’e from *-o stems.

Polish inherits two main Proto-Slavic endings in the vocative singular, *-e and *-u, also keeping their original range of use with few exceptions. *-o stems take -e: rodzie, wozie, panie, lesie, chłopie; velar nouns originally took this ending, seen today in some fossilized forms like Boże człowiecze, Old Polish dusze Wojciesze, but even from the earliest times -u can be seen, and becomes the exceptionless ending during the Middle Polish era. Nouns ending in -ec also etymologically take -e, as -ec comes from Proto-Slavic *-ьkъ. *-u stems except synu and domu also take -e via leveling with *-o stems: wole, miodzie, czynie, and *-jo stems keep -u: mężu, przyjacielu, cesarzu. *-i and *-n stems level to -u instead of *-i: gościu, gołębiu, kamieniu, dniu. Nouns ending in -icz, -ic sometimes took -e in Middle Polish: królewicze, Pryjamicze, ślachcicze, panicze, as the result of assimilation to forms such as ojcze, starcze and later they took -u.

Many changes occurred in the nominative plural; all endings found in Proto-Slavic are present, and -a (akta, grunta) is introduced:

1. The ending -i (after hardened consonants -y) of old *-o stems remain exclusively or next to -owie through the Middle Ages, the 16th century, and the 17th century among animate nouns: sąsiedzi, chłopi, anieli, biskupi, brytani, lwi, psi, charci, prorocy, krucy, wilce, ptacy. Placenames such as Mydlnicy and Skotnicy also show this ending until the end of the 14th century. Then since the 18th century its use is limited to some personal nouns, in agreement with its modern usage. The process of separating -i (-y) or -owie as a special category of masculine personal nouns finished in the literary dialect only in the 19th century, and there is still much fluctuation in dialects. Personal nouns ending in -ch originally kept inherited -’y (<*-i) with a hardened sz: mnich, Włoch, mniszy, Włoszy, and during the 17th century begin to take -i based on sąsiedzi, chłopi, changing sz to ś: mnisi, Włosi, see § Proto-Slavic *ś̌ *ź̌. Nouns ending in -ec also take -y (<*-i) from the oldest times: mędrcy, kupcy, igrcy, pokarańcy, nowochrzczeńcy, zabilcy next to jeńcowie, łyścowie.
2. The ending *-ove (> -owie) of *-u stems from the earliest times sees extended use beyond its original range, which is one of the most characteristic features of development of the Polish nominative plural. Based on inherited synowie, wołowie, new nominative plural forms with -owie formed, namely old -o- stems of animate nouns: aniołowie, biskupowie, prorokowie, etc. These forms often appear alongside forms with -i||-y: biskupi||biskupowie, lwi||lwowie and are still retained in the 17th century. During the Old Polish era -owie also spreads to *-jo stem animate nouns: mężowie, wróblowie. -owie could also be seen in hard and soft-stem inanimate nouns: językowie, ostatkowie, przebytkowie, chodowie, etc. After j and soft consonants -ewie could be seen § Proto-Slavic *e. The use of -owie in this regard reached its peak in the Old Polish era, and sporadically occurs in the 16th century and exceptionally even in the 17th century. Later the use of -owie was limited only to some personal nouns, but this norm is not fully established; personal names mostly use -owie; some words use both: autorzy, profesorzy, filolodzy and autorowie, profesorowie, filologowie.
3. The ending -i for old *-jo stems is not known in Polish outside a group of placenames ending in -icy: Biskupicy, Janowicy, Jarocicy, coming from family names, but already from the end of the 14th century these placenames occur in the form Kiskupice, Janowice, Jarocice, takken from the old accusative. Similarly szlachcicy, dziedzicy, which are retained longer, and rodzicy all the way to the 18th century.
4. *-e was using with the suffixes -ciel, -arz, -anin: przyjaciele, wielbiciele, lekarze, ślusarze, mieszczanie, Zagórzanie, and also old *-n stem nouns: kamienie, płomienie, rzemienie; place names only use -e: Koniarze, Psarze, but already in the 12th century there is a change of -arze > -ary based on placenames like Mydlniki, Skotniki, where the old nominative/accusative form from -o stems were set.
5. The ending -’e < *-ьje comes from *-i stem masculine nouns such as *pǫti and can be seen in czerwie, gołębie, goście, gwoździe, ludzie, łokcie, niedźwiedzie, ognie, paznokcie.
6. -e from *-e as well as *-ьje encompasses -jo stem personal nouns via leveling: krole, męże, bogacze, pieniacze.
7. -e in foreign -ans, -ens, -ons nouns such as romans, kredens, anons occurs as early as the 17th century alongside -y for hard-stem nouns; the motivation of its use here remains to be explained.
8. The vast majority of old *-o, *-jo, and *-u nouns use the accusative for the nominative, including:
  1. Forms ending in -y||-i (after k g) in terms of hard stem inanimate nouns from old *-o and *-u stem nouns: sad, płoty, obrazy. During the 17th century it displaced original -i or -owie in non-personal animate nouns, meaning forms like lwi, psi, krucy or lwowie, orłowie, krukowie disappear and in their place forms such as lwy, psy, orły, kruki appear, which is the current norm, meaning that outside of -y||-i (after k g) only hard-stem masculine personal nouns have -i or -owie. But even here -y can be seen from the 16th century: Longobardy, Szkoty, Bułgary, Serby, filozofy, doktory, biskupy, hetmany. -y (-i) sees further use in the literary language during the Enlightenment also for masculine personal nouns: syny, ministry, Cezary, Wenedy, Tatary, wnuki, naczelniki, Greki. These forms are result of an agelong tendency to use the accusative for the nominative. This tendency won out among inanimate nouns in the Middle Ages, and for non-personal animate nouns (psi > psy) in the 17th century. In the 18th century this also affected personal animate nouns, probably as the result of a tendency of this century to renew the literary language using the colloquial language. But these nominative-accusative forms had taken on a somewhat pejorative, dismissive, or disrespectful tone some time before this, and as Kopczyński states “...gdy czasem myślimy upodlić niecnotliwą osobę ludzką i do zwierząt przyrównać”, and Mrozisńki “Rzeczowniki męskie przybierają niekiedy w 1 przypadku zakończenie rodzaju nijakiego, co im nadaje pomysł upośledzenia: popy chłopy żydy”. By the fourth quarter of the 19th century these forms were neutral in meaning. To this day these forms can be used with nouns of contempt: łobuzy, obdartusy, łotry, snobby, łakomczuchy, wyrodki, nieuki, wyrostki, opryszki, or with a connotation of superiority with regard to immature beings: noworodki, chłopaki, dzieciaki. They can also be used as archaisms for stylistic purposes, seen used by Wyspiański: bohatery, syny, chłopy.
  2. -e < *-ě among soft stem or hardened stem non-personal nouns originally of the *-jo stem: konie, kraje, węże, noże, miecze, płacze, klucze. According to this non-personal nouns with the ending -ec < *-ьkъ take this: końce, kopce, proporce, zwojce, łańce. Contemporarily with the above it also starts to see use among personal -ec nouns with an innovated nominative-accusative ending -e: ojce, Połowce, which is supported by masculine -c(a) nouns (< *-ьka) which in the nominative took -e during the Old and Middle Polish period in agreeance with feminine nouns of the old *-ja stem. Only from the middle of the 18th century do they shed their old ending and take on modern -y (-i) modeled on personal -ec nouns such as starzec, strzelec: wybiercy podatków (from 1744).
9. Since the 15th century the ending -a for hard stems mostly in terms borrowed from Latin, German, and rarely for native terms. In recent decades these forms see less use under influence of normative recommendations, which deny them quality of diligence (które odmawiają im cechy staranności).

The vocative plural of all types merges with the nominative, and the history of both cases is shared.

The genitive plural endings -ów and -i||-y spread beyond their original use only now *-ъ and *-ь, i.e. -∅, are kept only vestigially. This was motivated by the loss of yers, which caused the genitive to become less distinct, which in turn caused a need for more distinct forms. -ów gains much use, originally coming *-u stems, and in the earliest times already dominates in *-o and *-jo stems as well as consonantal stems. Soft-stem nouns sometimes had -ew: krolew. Everywhere already in the pre-literate era the endings -ъ and -ь were displaced, and the vestigial -∅ ending is seen in:

1. In a few words words in the Old and Middle Polish era, e.g. woz (14th century), god (14th century), ząb (1466 and 1570), tysiąc (14th-16th centuries), dziej (15th century), włos (16th century), raz (16th century), sąsiad (until the 18th century), all lost, and in fossilized dotychczas.
2. In names of nations that later became names for areas: do Włoch, Prus, Mieniec, Czech, Węgier, Francuz, Turek which remain largely as archaisms.
3. In names of families or occupations that become placenames: do Krzeszowic, Racławic, Świątnik, Kobiernik, Mydlnik which last to this day.
4. From placenames coming from occupations forms with -arz which took *-ъ in the genitive: do Piekar, Koniar, Owczar, used today.
5. In -anin nouns, which in the plural declined like consonantal stems, so *-ъ in the genitive: dworzan, mieszczan, Rzymian, Zalesian, used today.
6. In the words przyjaciół, nieprzyjaciół created modeled on the genitive of consonantal stems, used today.
7. In reflexes of consonantal stems which resulted from leveling, seen in Old Polish: kamion, jelon, sążon, kmiot, łokiet.

-i||-y (after hardened consonants) also sees expanded use, it is inherited in ludzi, gości, gwoździ, gołębki, łokci, paznokci, niedźwiedzi, ogni, czerwi, later it encompasses consonantal and *-jo stems via analogical leveling: koni, dni, kamieni, promieni, miesięcy, pieniędzy, męży, przyjacieli and then competes with -ów and expands among soft-stem nouns and sees more use in e.g. -arz, -aż, -erz, -eż, -orz nouns and -acz, -ocz nouns; in all words -ów is possible but less common. -ciel nouns except przyjaciel, nieprzyjaciel almost exclusively have -i, but -j nouns predominately have -ów, but pokoi, złodziei occur.

In the dative plural, the ending *-omъ > -om shows the most durability and expansive capability; its use remains uninterrupted in *-o stems and from the earliest times encompasses *-u stems and consonantal stems, it also displaces -em < *-emъ of *-jo stems and < *-ьmъ of -i stems, which can be seen until the beginning of the 17th century: koniem, gościem, rodzajem, rycerzem, stróżem, winowatcem, ludziem, dzieciem. Next to -om, -óm (-um) appears as the result of a tendency to raise vowels before nasal consonants: klasztorum, ku wrotum (15th century), like Szymun, słuń. For a short period, -am from feminine declensions appears: kapłanam, pagórkam, koniam, rycerzam, perhaps via nouns semantically masculine but declensionally feminine like wojewoda, sprawca; this begins in the 15th century, sees more use in the first half of the 16th century, after which its use shrinks and eventually falls out of use, seen as late as the 17th century when the ending -om becomes the only ending.

The accusative plural changes depending on if the nouns is personal or non-personal, non-personal nouns keep the inherited state, namely:

1. The ending -y || -i (after k g) in old *-o and *-u stems;
2. The ending -e in old *-jo stems;
3. The ending -e in old *-n stems. Only dzień takes the ending -i from *-i stems. Old *-i stems take -e based on the accusative of *-jo stems.

The accusative of personal nouns has two eras - in the first era, ending in the 17th century, the accusative is the same as non-personal nouns: popy, dziewosłęby, anioły, bogi, grzeszniki, niewierniki, sprzeciwniki, Jerozolimczyki, syny, towarzysze, króle, więźnie, ochmistrze, kupce, and -ec and -c(a) nouns, modeled on *-jo stems, take the ending -e: jętce, zbieglce, winobrańce, oćce, powłoćce; -anin nouns keep old -y, and -ciel and -arz nouns keep old -e. The forms przyjacioły, nieprzyjacioły with -y occur rarely based on hard-stem nouns. The forms ludzi (from etymological *-i stems) and ludzie (based on *-jo stems) fluctuate in this era from the earliest times. In the second era, from the 17th century onward, the genitive is used as the accusative; in the 16th century there are relatively few examples of this, and only from the 17th century does the usage of genitive as accusative become more common, and the old accusative forms acquire an archaic character and become part of poetic language in the last decades of the 18th century with a particular stylistic function of marking something as upper register or pejorative.

The instrumental plural is divided into two eras, before the 16th century and from the 17th century, with the 16th century, especially its final decades, being a transitional period. In the Old Polish era the inherited state is generally kept - old *-o stems keep the ending -y||-i (after k g), including -ec nouns; perhaps these are the only trace of -i of *-jo stems, -ic nouns follow them, z dziedzicy, nad rodzicy, ślachcicy, -anin nouns used the old ending -y: miedzy pogany (14th century), z mieszczany, Walentiniany, dworzany (16th century). Old *-u, *-i, and *-n stems take -mi, which could be considered the etymological reflex of *-ъmi and *-ьmi, then -mi spreads in use in the Middle Ages, taking over old *-jo noun, it also appears in -ciel and -arz nouns (compare also nieprzyjacioły). -mi even spreads to *-o nouns, competing at the time with -y. The originally dual suffix -oma is rarely seen in the 16th century, and generally nouns with this form are accompanied by a numeral. Appearing in the 16th century, initially rarely and more commonly towards the end of the century is the ending -ami, originating from the feminine vocalic instrumental plural - within Rej's works it constitutes 6% of hard-stem nouns and about 2% of soft-stem nouns; within Kochanowski's works around 11% of poetry and 26% of prose. The grammarian Strojeński considered it a vulgarism. From the 16th century it becomes more common and limits -mi to just a soft-stem nouns: końmi, gośćmi, liśćmi, przyjaciółmi and displaces -y, which only remains in some fossilized phrases: dawnymi czasy, perhaps was used for archaicizing purposes. Dialects show a similar situation in that -ami is the predominate ending, -mi occurs less than in the literary standard, but -oma, which occurred only as an rarely of sixteen and seventeen-century texts, sees common use in northern Silesia and Masurian: palcóma, chopóma, bratóma, konióma, płotóma.

Polish sees three endings in the locative plural, -’ech from *-ěchъ and *-ьchъ in early texts and two innovations, it does not continue *-ich from *-ъxъ; -och, occurring in the preliterate period, and -ach, from the feminine vocalic locative, seen only sporadically in the Middle Ages, then is in clear use from the middle of the 16th century. Old *-o, *-u, and *-i stems originally predominately used -’ech, is used less from the middle of the 16th century, rarely in the second half of the 18th century, and is now limited to some archaic placenames: Prusiech, Węgrzech, Włoszech as the names of countries. -’ech replaces Proto-Slavic *-ich via leveling. -och, a regional ending of Lesser Poland, Silesia, and Red Ruthenia (whereas in Greater Poland, Kujawy, Łęczyca, and Masovia the ending -ech is seen), can be seen from the oldest texts for various stems, especially frequently in soft and hard-stem nouns ending in -k, -g, -ch displacing old -ech, then in the second half of the 16th century -och disappears. The origin of -och is likely that it arose from leveling with the nominative, genitive, and dative endings -owie, -ow, and -om, because they are used in contrast with the soft-stem endings -ewie, -ew, -em, and -ech causes softening of the final consonant, so as a result there is the series mężewie, mężew, męzem, męzech, and the opposing bogowie, bogow, bogom, bodzech; the form bodzech stands in contrast to the stem bog-, which results in the ending -och, and when soft-stem nouns leveled to hard stem nouns (-ewie > -owie, -ew > -ow, -em > -om), then -och also replaced -ech. Another claim is that -och arose from the leveling itself, so mężewie mężowie, mężew > mężow, mężem > mężom, mężech > mężoch, from which -och also appears in hard-stems. Nouns ending in k, g, ch keep -och the longest likely in order to avoid changing the stem (k : c, g : dz, ch : sz). Grappin in the self-published work Historie de la flexion du nom in polonais, Wrocław, 1955 derives -och from Proto-Slavic *-oxъ of *-u stems, considering it an old, native and regional morphological element of Lesser Polish which spread in the 16th century. The withdrawal of -och is explained by phonetic causes, namely that when in the feminine locative the form -ach (with clear a) became established, it started to replace -och, which speakers assumed to be from -ách, which then was displaced by -ach. The ending -ach appears rarely already in the Middle Ages, and sees the most use in the 16th century, especially in the second half. Characteristically of their region of origin, Rej, Orzechowski, and Bielski often use -och, and Kochanowski never, preferring new -ach, and thanks to his high regard greatly influenced the rising popularity of -ach, which from the 17th century sees dominant use, and ultimately exclusiveness. In 15th century texts this ending is sometimes written with slanted ⟨á⟩. Perhaps this came from Lesser Poland where the ending -och was used transitionally, and -ách was a compromise between -ach and -och, or potentially also taken from the feminine locative under where at the earliest it could have developed under influence of dative -ám. The spread of -ach in the masculine has various theories, but it is certainly partially due to the tendency to level locative plural forms regardless of gender, as how in pronominal and adjectival declensions there is only one locative form since Proto-Slavic for all three genders; -ach might have had an advantage as it dominated in feminine declension, whereas -ech and -och competed with each other in masculine and neuter nouns and weakened as a result. Nouns semantically masculine but morphologically feminine such as wojewoda, sprawca could have helped spread -ach to masculine nouns. Another important factor is the fact that of the two feminine endings, -ach and -ách, -ách approached masculine -och forms, and in the 16th century -ách submits to -ach and -och could have been pulled into this process.

==== Declension of feminine vocalic nouns ====
Feminine vocalic nouns come from Proto-Slavic *-a-, *-ja- stem nouns.

Old -a sems, which in Polish are hard-stem nouns, take the ending -a in the nominative singular, which in the historic era was short, later clear, and continues now in this state uninterrupted; also in this group are nouns of masculine semantics, e.g. sługa, wojewoda, junoszka, ewanielista, patriarcha. Old -ja stem, which in Polish are soft-stem nouns, also take -a, but here it can be either long or short, later clear a or slanted á, e.g. bania, chwila, but burzá, wolá. This also includes semantically masculine nouns, e.g. cieśla, and loanwords, e.g. flasza, sala. If -a is preceded by -j-, then it is short/clear: kaznodzieja, knieja, nadzieja, szyja, zbroja, żmija; one exception is kopijá based on loanwords, which have slanted á: ambicyjá, Assyryjá, Grecyjá, historyjá, etc., similarly Chananeá, Medeá (Kochanowski). Nouns with the suffixes -ic(a) < *ik(a) and -c(a) < *-ьka act in accordance with their original hard-stem nature and take clear -a, including masculine nouns. Over time the loss of -á in literary Polish levels in the nominative of these different types since the 18th century and clear -a spreads. -i inherited from Proto-Slavic is kept in a few nouns: bogini, łani, pani, but sometimes undergo leveling to -á: łaniá, boginiá, gospodyniá, ksieniá (16th-17th century).

The genitive singular ending -y || -i (after k g) in old *-a stems remains uninterrupted: lichoty, prawoty, prawdy, wody; matki, wargi. -e < *-ě after soft or hardened consonants dominates in the Old Polish era and the 16th century, and in the 17th century it slowly yields, and can be seein in the 18th century as an archaism, e.g. nadzieje, ziemie. In the earliest texts soft-stem nouns whose nominative end in -á take a new ending -éj: woléj, roléj, strożéj, duszéj, żądzéj, Babilonijéj, Idumejéj, and also masculine sędziéj, collective braciéj; and also nominatives ending in -i: paniéj, posełkiniéj (14th century); this ending continues to the end of the 17th century: pochodniéj, studniéj, wieczerzéj, władzéj, bestyjéj, Persyjéj, Grecyjéj (Rej); łaźniéj mszéj, sukniéj, braciéj (Kochanowski); rożéj, kurtuazyjéj, szyjéj, boginiéj, koronacyjéj (17th century), and over the course of the 17th century it falls out of use, attested by the grammarian Woyna (1690) proscribing oracyi, opinii, Maryi. -éj is a Polish innovation based on the feminine genitivedeclension of compound adjectives leveled to the dative: dobrá pracá therefore dobréj pracéj; however it could also be a phonetic development of -é > -éj, and in practice -éj could have been equivalent to -y||-’i. Neither of the soft-stem endings -e and -ej were retained. -i||-y (after hardened consonants) occurs as the result of leveling with the genitive singular of soft-stem feminine nouns, probably also supported somewhat by -y of the genitive of feminine hard-stem nouns; -i||-y can be seen sporadically in the 14th and 15th century prawicy, nędzy, nadziei, rarely in the 16th century: oblubienicy, pieczy (Rej); bogini, łożnicy, stajni (Kochanowski). This new ending spreads in the 17th century and from the 18th century is used exclusively, but -e is kept in dialects, in these dialects -i is also not uncommon, especially for -á nouns: studniá, rolá - studni, roli, but ziemia świéca - ziemie, świéce. It is possible that -i arose from old -é, but in ziemie, -e was not slanted and couldn't phonetically develop into -i.

The dative singular ending *-ě > -e remains unchanged: sierocie, bitwie, chwale, prośbie, dziedzinie, opoce, drodze (14th century); -i (-y after functionally soft consonants) within soft-stem -a and -i nouns is nearly exclusive before the 16th century, dominates in the 17th century, and from the 18th century again exclusive: ziemi, prawicy, Babiloniji (14th century); tajemnicy, stolicy, zbroi, Troi (16th century). Like in the genitive, the innovation -ej occurs in the dative in based on the feminine declension of compound adjectives; it was used for soft-stem nouns ending in -á and -i from the Middle Ages to the end of the 17th century: braciej (14th century.), bestyjej, Lukrecyjej, pracej, wolej, gospodyniej (16th century), żądzej, paniej, ksieniej, Kornelijej (17th century).

The development of the feminine accusative singular is associated with the development of the feminine nominative singular. Polish hard-stem nouns (in the nominative -a) take -ę: naukę, rękę, (14th century), also -ica, -ca nouns and native -ja nouns: nadzieję, błyskawicę, potwarcę (15th century), studnicę, stolicę, owcę (16th century). Soft-stem nouns before the 17th century have two endings depending on the nominative ending: -a nouns take -ę, and -á and -i nouns take -ą: duszę, ziemię, jutrznię (15th century), but bracią, sędzią, wolą, pieczą, puszczą, (15th century), pracą, tłuszczą, wolą, wieczerzą, (Rej), leliją, lutnią, rolą, władzą, panią (Kochanowski), but already in the Middle Ages a certain fluctuation can be seen with regard to -ę and -ą as the result of mutual interference of the two accusative endings, e.g. jutrznię, nutrznią, karmię, karmią. The process of leveling reaches its peak in the 17th century, when -ę sees increasing use. This is explained by the influence of -ę forms supported by the loss of -á, which results in a lack of support for another accusative ending which was supported by a different nominative ending. At the end of the 17th century, the grammarian Woyna considered -ą as more elegant and more careful in a nouns ending in -á, all of which borrowed in the form of -ijá, -yjá, and also -i nouns, this is evidence that a certain sense of the old norm was kept since there was a need to support it with grammatical correctness formulations. -ę spreads in the 18th century, and the most resistant nouns (namely -ija, -yja nouns) also begin to take -ę, but traditional forms using -ą for -á nouns are kept even in the 19th century, and Małecki in his grammar from 1879 recommends -ą for all nouns ending in -ija, -yja, and -i (panią, Zofiją, okazyą), and for a few other soft-stem nouns he claims that any fluctuation is regionally determined: “nie pozostaje przeto, jak na czas bliżej nieokreślony pozostawić to jescze tradycji poszczególnych okolic” (there is no other option but to leave this to the traditions of individual regions for an indefinite period of time). Kryński in his grammar from 1907 says “ostateczny wynik tej walki, zakończonej za dni naszych, zapewnił stanowczą przewagę formom biernika na -ę nad formami liczebnie mniejszymi na -ą” (the final result of this struggle, which ended in our times, ensured a decisive advantage for the accusative forms in -ę over the numerically smaller forms in -ą). panią is theonly exception, preserved thanks to its use in fossilized terms of respect. Dialects differentiating -a and -á generally also keep -ą in the accusative where -á is in the nominative.

In the Polish instrumental singular there is only -ą, which is the reflex of the old long nasal vowel which resulted from contractions (*-ojǫ, *-ejǫ > ǫ): drogą, prawdą, siekirą, błyskawicą, ziemią, bracią, duszą (14th century). In most western and central dialects -ą changed to -ám, pronounced most often as -om. This pronunciation occurs even in dialects where -ǫ is kept, meaning that -om probably did not arise from sound changes alone, but also based on -em from the masculine and neuter instrumental.

Polish -e continues *-ě in the locative singular hard-stems uninterrupted: ręce, drodze, pysze, robocie, krzywdzie, głowie, chwale, śmierze, glinie. Soft-stem nouns continue primarily *-i, in the form of -i or changes to -y after hardened consonants: nadziei, ziemi, woli, jutrzni, okolicy, dziewicy, świecy (14th century), sbroi, tajemnicy, trojcy, rozkoszy, puszczy, wieczerzy, bóżnicy, wieży (16th century). Alongside these two inherited and dominating endings the innovation -éj appears, also seen in the genitive and dative, based the feminine compound adjectival declension - seen sporadically in the Middle Ages: ziemiej, wolej, and seen somewhat more often in the 16th century: Arabijej, Azyjej, ewangelijej, historyjej, nestyjej, szarańczej, wolej (Rej), Asyryjéj, Frygijéj, gospodyniéj, kancelaryjéj, pracéj, roléj, Trójej (Kochanowcki). Nouns that take this form are soft-stem -á nouns, especially loanwords ending in -ijá, -yjá; this form can be seen as late as in the 17th century: na lutniej, w Hiszpanijej, w Persyjej, armonijej, komedyjej.

Hard-stem nouns in the vocative singular continue *-o, coro, sławo, chawło (14th century); soft-stem nouns ending in -a keep original -e in the Middle Ages: dusze, dziewice, służebnice, especially gospodze, and very exceptionally are modeled on consonantal feminine nouns: lutni, ziemi (16th century), but as early as the 15th century begin to take -o based on hard-stems: duszo, rożo, nadziejo (15th century) and this leveling tendency finishes in the 16th century. Another tendency is the usage of the nominative for the vocative - it can be seen from the earliest times in hard and soft stems: Bogurodzica, dziewica, Maryja, Zbawicielu nasz nadzieja, chwalcie ji niebo i ziemia, powyszona bądź prawica, wroć sie dusza, wesel się gora, bądź ręka, płyń mołwa, wnidzi prośba (14th century); ustąp melankolijá, piękna Zofijá (16th century). The nominative for the vocative is everywhere for -i nouns: pani, gospodyni, bogini, but sometimes -o appears via analogy: panio (1772). Diminutives with a soft consonantal stem or -l from the 16th century take -u: Kasiu, matulu - this is an innovation based on the vocative of corresponding masculine nouns: Józiu, synusiu, Karolu, but exceptionally Baśku, Zośku also occur.

Polish continues the nominative and accusative plural endings with regard to hard-stem: -y||-i (after k g), soft-stems -e: nominative: dziewki, rzeki, drogi, wargi, wody, mowy, gory, strzały, burze, ziemie, owce, błyskawice, dziewice (14th century); accusative: uliczki, roboty, radyy, ryby, ćmy, obietnice, owce, tłuszcze, role, studnie (14th century).

The genitive plural in Polish is marked -∅, inherited after the loss of yers: rąk, ksiąg, lichot, prawd, głow, mołw, gor, ran, łez; owiec, tajemnic, dusz, ziem (14th century), -nia nouns (< *-nja) take final -ń o r -n: sukień, sukien, studzień, studzien; forms with hard n appear to be secondary, but see use and by the end of the 17th century they become the only form except in north-east areas, where -ń are still in use in the 19th century, e.g. by. Adam Mickiewicz and Juliusz Słowacki. -a nouns (< *-ьja) such as świnia, lędźwia took the ending -i, which is the inherited form of *-ьjь, and from here the ending spreads among nouns ending in -nia preceded by a consonant: luśni, wiśni, kłótni, pochodni, and other soft-stem nouns: duszy, ziemi, żądzy, wieży, chwili (15th-18th centuries), this ending continues even into the New Polish era, and after a period of fluctuation in the 19th century it establishes itself among -nia nouns preceded by a consonant: zbrodnia, kłótnia, kuźnia, dźwignia; among -arnia, -ernia, -alnia, -elnia, and -ownia nouns: kawiarni, cukierni, kopalni, czytelni, warowni, and with others: mszy, rękojmi, wieczerzy; some nouns show alternate forms: kuchni||kuchen, sukni||sukien, studni||studzien. Based on spellings of -ija||-yja nouns such as disputaciy, bestiy (Rej); konstytuciy (Skarga), opiniy (Woyna), it seems they were pronounced as dysputacyj, bestyj, konstytucyj, opinij, that is with -∅, but most likely there was a possible alternation with -i, which is where the fluctuations in pronunciation come from. Signs of this uncertainty can be found in 19th century grammars: Henryk Suchecki recommends history, lilij, while Adam Kryński oppines: “to nie jest słuszne, gdyż sprzeciwia się powszechnemu wymawianiu” (this is not correct because it contradicts the common pronunciation), and the want to distinguish the genitive singular lilii and genitive plural lilij may not justify such innovations “wobec faktu, że język żywy zgoła rożnicy tej nie wyrobili” (in view of the fact that the living language has not made this difference at all); Antoni Małecki supports the spelling prowincyj, but says that “wymawianie rzeczywiste nasze jednak nie jest ani w liczbie mnogiej herezyj linij, ale jedynie tych herezyi i linii” (our actual pronunciation, however, is neither in the plural herezyj linij, but only of these herezyi i linii). The modern norm takes -i and is written: herezji, lilii, with only a few exceptions, where the context does not rule out ambiguity of singular vs plural forms. Native -ja words are notable, as some take -∅: szyj, żmij, and others -i: nadziei, zbroi. In the 17th and especially 18th century the ending -ów taken from the masculine can be seen: różów, zbrodniów, boginiów, and in the second half of the 18th century it occurs very often among some of the notable authors, e.g. Krasicki, especially in words adapted with -yja, -ija: komisyjów, sesyjów, and of course also myszów, koniów; this was removed from the literary standard probably under influence of grammarians such as Kopczyński. -ów in the genitive plural of feminine nouns can also be seen in dialects.

Medieval Polish originally inherits the dative plural ending -am and it replaces *-em < *-ьmъ: kobyłkam, ścieżkam, drogam, nogam, wargam, prawotam, stdzam, duszam, studniam (14th and 15th centuries), and the masculine ending -om can be seen exceptionally: przedawcom, przestępcom (15th century). -om sees a clear increase in use in the 16th century, initially among masculine nouns: drapieżcom, starostom, kaznodziejom, patryjarchom, but also increasingly frequently among feminine nouns, when in the middle of the century a major shift occurs, as Rej uses old -am almost exclusively for masculine nouns; Kochanowski only exceptionally uses -ám, and normally uses -óm: sirotóm, owcóm, poetóm, panióm. The 16th century is a period where -am slowly falls out of use and -om spreads, spreading more from the second half of the century; this process can be explained by the tendency for inter-declension leveling via the spread of formally masculine nouns taking feminine endings. It is possible that -om as a phonetic development of -am, as in texts two variants occur, -am and -ám, and Rej has consistently -ám, and a raised under influence of m and as such entirely or almost entirely merged with -óm, leaving an orthographical question whether one should write -ám or -óm. Some dialects prefer -ám, generally those where -ám is clearly distinguished: ludziám, psám, krowám, or even ludziam, kóniam, krowam, e.g. in Masovia; in Greater Poland however this ending is realized in agreement with áN clusters, and not oN: /wɔɛɡoɘn/ (ogon), /koɘŋum/, ludzium, zbiyrum - this would suggest that the feminine dative plural ending -am became preferred, at least in some dialects, as did the feminine ending of the nominative and locative.

The instrumental plural ending is inherited into Polish as -ami: nogami, wargami, sirotami, wodami, głowami, mołwami, łzami, panoszami, obietnicami (14th and 15th centuries). From the oldest times to modern the sporadic use of -y (-i after k g) via analogy to masculine nouns can be seen: pod wargi ich, z cudzołożcy (14th and 15th centuries), szalonemi wełny, z poetry, miedzy zbójcy (16th century) and its use in the 18th and 19th centuries usually has a stylistic function of a non-quotidian nature: trwożysz groźby (Krasicki), pod twojemi nogi fale morza (Krasiński), złotymi farby, gwiazdy niebieskimi, pod ciemnemi jodły, łzy brylantowemi, ze srebrnemi rzęsy (Słowacki), przysięgi straszliwem (Wyspiański). The ending -oma appears in some dialects: nogoma, krowoma, see § Declension of masculine nouns.

The inherited locative plural ending -ach dominates in Polish, and could have also been -ách, as there are two uncertain fluctuating variants ni the 16th century, Bielski has -ách, Rej -ach or -ách (-ách occurring ten times more frequently), Kochanowski and Skarga -ach, and even in two different publications of the same work alternations occur between -ach||-ách indicating a dialectal nature determined by the typesetter or proofreader, as the marking of slanting depended on them, as 16th century manuscripts usually don't distinguish it. It is indicative that Kochanowski recommends it only to avoid ambiguity in his orthographical recommendations: żádny (żaden) but żadny (brzydki). It seems that -ách was of Lesser Polish origin and arose under influence of the dative plural ending -ám; in the 16th century -ách gives way: naukach, drogach, wodach, gorach, ćmach, nizinach, pokusach, tajnicach, wieżach, ziemiach, jutrzniach (14th and 15th centuries), arfach bitwach, ewanielistach, frankach, baniach, bałwochwalcach, zbrojach (16th centuries). Aside from this ending, which ended up being so expansive it also took over masculine, vocalic feminine, and neuter declension, -ech and -och be rarely be seen via analogy: robociech, szaciech, głowiech (15th and 16th centuries); rękoch, krainoch, sędzioch (16th century), -ech occurs especially after d t s, commented on by Mesgnien.

==== Declension of feminine consonantal nouns ====
Feminine consonantal nouns come from Proto-Slavic *-i-, *-u-, and *-r- stem nouns.

In the nominative and accusative singular Polish has -∅ from the loss of *ьː kość < *kostь: śmierć, żółć, bystrość, ciemność, mądrość, świat, łość, bojaźń, łeż (14th and 15th centuries). A number of vocalic feminine nouns enter this declension: głębiá, karmiá, łodziá, podróżá, pogoniá, toniá, pieczeniá, tarczá, kolejá which lost -á keeping the original state of the stem: głąb́, karḿ, łódź; a few Proto-Slavic *ū stems: krew, cerkiew, chorągiew, rzodkiew, and originally -y is kept in some medieval forms: kry, jętry, świekry, cerki, Pełty, Nary, and others, and these in the oldest era show accusative for the nominative: *cь̀rkъvь < cerkiew; and Proto-Slavic *-r stems: mać (simplified from the old nominative *maci < *mati) and macierz (continuing the accusative as nominative *màterь).

Polish inherits genitive singular Proto-Slavic *i stems as -i or -y after hardened consonants: boleści, czystości, głębokości, czci, śmierci, myśli, mocy, rzeczy, rozkoszy, potwarzy (14th and 15th centuries); in the Middle Polish era the ending -ej can be seen from analogy to vocalic feminine nouns in the genitive: przyjaźniej, kradzieżej, or -e: gęśle, czeladzie, słodycze. Old *-u and *-r stems initially keep inherited -e: cerekwie, krwie, macierze, which can be seen sporadically until the 17th century, but already in the oldest texts forms such as cerekwi, krwi, macierzy with -i (-y) based on vocalic feminine nouns occur.

Polish continues -i, -y in the dative singular after hardened consonants from Proto-Slavic *-i from *-i stems: pamięci, postaci, mąrości, sprawiedliwości, czci, mocy, nocy (14th and 15th centuries).

The accusative singular ending -∅ here after the loss of yers.

Polish continues -ą in the instrumental singular from Proto-Slavic *-ьjǫ from *-i stems: czcią, gorącością, śmiercią, siedmią, mocą, rozkoszą (14th and 15th centuries).

Polish continues -i, -y in the locative singular after hardened consonants from Proto-Slavic *-i from *-i stems: w bladości, we czci, w nienawiści, w szyrokości, w piąci, w bojaźni, w mocy, w pomocy (14th and 15th centuries). The ending -ej can be seen exceptionally in the 16th century as an analogy innovation based vocalic feminine declension: o niewdzięcznościej, w otchłaniej.

Polish continues -i, -y in the vocative singular after hardened consonants from Proto-Slavic *-i from *-i stems: gęśli, żałości, łodzi, mocy, nocy (14th-16th centuries).

In the nominative and vocative plural Polish takes the Proto-Slavic ending *-i, secondarily from the accusative based on feminine *-a, *-ja nouns, where also nomiminative-accusative forms were established: boleści, otchłani, złości, myśli, kaźni, postaci, mocy, rzeczy (14th and 15th centuries); baśni gałęzi, latorośli, pieczęci, przepaści, wsi, twarzy, rozkoszy, nocy, obręczy (16th century); in the 16th century some leveling with vocalic feminine nouns begins to occur and -e sees use, but it only appears in a small number of examples. Only in the second half of the 18th century does the ending -e spread, and a number of nouns take equally -i and -e. This continues in the 19th century, and the usage of -e intensifies despite resistance from grammarians, such as Małecki, who opine that “zakończenie -i jest jedynym właściwym, -e, przeciwnie, późniejszym wtrętem, który by rad pierwotne -i wyprzeć do reszty” (the ending -i is the only proper one, -e, on the contrary, is a later insertion that would like to supplant the original -i completely). As a result, the two endings are still in competition with one another, some have only -i: brwi, maści, napaści, kości, ości, przykrości, własności, or some only -e: łodzie, cerkwie, chorągwie, rozkosze, twarze, and some both, where -e seems more common: garście||garści, moce||mocy, noce||nocy, postacie||postaci, wsie||wsi.

Polish continues -i, -y after hardened consonants in the genitive plural from Proto-Slavic *-ьjь from *-i stems: boleści, złości, myśli, kaźni, rzeczy (14th and 15th centuries). From the 15th-18th centuries -∅ occurs based on vocalic feminine nouns: twarz, mysz, rozpacz, podróż. Another innovation is -ów taken from masculine declension: pieśniów, wsiów, myszów, which appears more often in the second half of the 18th century and first half of the 19th century, also seen in dialects.

Historic Polish did not inherit the dative plural *-em, which would be the inherited form of *-ьmъ of *-i stems, and -am from vocalic feminine nouns replaces it: czeluściam, kościam, złościam, postaciam, gardzielam, myślam, kaźniam, rzeczam (14th and 15th centuries); głębokościam, kościam, złościam, rzeczam (16th century), and in the 17th century this ending falls out of use; in its place -om spreads taken from masculine and neuter declension, applied here via its leveling found in feminine vocalic declension. The first examples of this are seen in the Middle Ages: kościom, kaźniom, skroniom (14th and 15th centuries); and in the 16th century, especially the second half (Kochanowski, Skarga), and -om sees more use than old -am and in the next century starts to dominate.

Polish continues -i, -y after hardened consonants in the accusative plural from Proto-Slavic *-i from *-i stems: boleści, czeluści, kości, lści, próżności, złości, przyjaźni, niemocy, rzeczy (14th century); dźwirzy, baśni (15th century); brzydliwości, pieczęci, goleni, twarzy, roskoszy, niemocy (16th centuries); skroni, łodzi, potwarzy (17th century), and many nouns keep this ending now, but already in the earliest texts the ending -e can be seen: koście, moce, łże, łodzie, dźwirze, karmie, czystoście (14th and 15th centuries); in the Middle and New Polish era these nouns increase, and in modern Polish it appears more and more often as the only ending: kadzie, kiście, łodzie, rozkosze, twarze, or equal: moce, noce, pieczęcie, pięście, postacie, przepaście, wsie. -e came into use under influence of feminine soft-stem -a nouns in the accusative plural.

The instrumental plural ending -mi < *-ьmi is seen relatively rarely: gęślmi, żyrdźmi, dźwirzmi (14th and 15th centuries); pieczeńmi, pierśmi (17th centuries); it is kept now in kośćmi, nićmi, and -ami, taken from vocalic feminine declension spreads from the earliest times: żerdziami, kościami, ganiebnościami, złościami (14th and 15th centuries).

The ending -ech < *-ьchъ is seen relatively rarely in the Old Polish era: postaciech, światłościech, kaźniech, głębokościech, roskoszech and -ach begins to take its place already from the earliest period, taken from vocalic feminine declension; this process develops in the 14th and 15th centuries, there are 7 examples of -ech in 6 nouns in Psałterz floriański, 3 in 2 nouns in Psałterz puławski, and from the 16th century -ach becomes the only ending; -och sees rare use from the 14th-16th centuries taken from masculine declension: postacioch, głębokościoch, gęśloch, kaźnioch, rzeczoch, drzwioch.

==== Declension of neuter nouns ====
Neuter nouns come from Proto-Slavic *-o-, *-jo-, *-n-, *-t-, and *-s- stem nouns.

Polish inherits the nominative, accusative, and vocative singular endings -o from Proto-Slavic *-o and *-s stems, -e from *-jo stems, and *-ę from *-n and *-nt stems: siano, mleko, mięso, żelazo, sidło, dziedzictwo, księstwo, świadectwo; oblicze, sierce, słuńce, zboże, morze, czekmanie, pierze, przyjęcie, miłosirdzie; brzemię, ramię, siemię, szczenię; ciało, słowo, ucho. Nouns originally ending in *-ьje sometimes take slanted -é: trzꟁsenyee (Sankt Florian Psalter), pienijé, radowanié, weselé, widzenié, śniadanié, zapalenié, dręczenié, przykrycié, skrzytanié, poruszęnié, zdrowié. In Old Polish there were two types of neuter endings, one with clear -e < *-e and one with slanted é < *-ьje, which can also be seen in the Middle Polish era in Kochanowski's works, and this difference was later lost due to leveling; sometimes -e leveled to -é for example in Knapski's and Kopczyński's works, and sometimes -é levels to -e, seen in the standard; slanted é sometimes raised to -i in nouns, seen at the beginning of the 17th century: ubieżeni, uciekani, miłosiedzi, otpoczywani, rozchwatani, wzdani, ruszeni, pici, wyobrażeni, zboży - this can still be seen in Silesian and northern Greater Polish, and in Silesia, the raised vowel is kept only after soft and hardened consonants; in Southern Silesia it merged with i and elsewhere as -y, and in northern Greater Poland all instances of final -e, even those which never had slanting, raise to -y, which stands in opposition to the rest of Polish, which generalized clear -e, and here slanted -é generalized. The word-forming suffix -e from *-ьje in nouns like chorąże as well as titles formed with pod- can be seen with slanting: podkomorzé, podczaszé, podłowczé, podstolé; the raising of -é as well as association to related adjectival nouns like łowczy, woźny, wojski caused nouns like podkomorze, podstole in the 16th century to take -i||-y in the nominative and decline like masculine adjectives. In some dialects words like cielę, siemię underwent significant weakening; northern dialects made and spread words like cielák, prosiák, zwierzák, and elsewhere words like siemię underwent some modifications, sometimes forms such as (ten) ramień, ramienia or sometimes ramie, ramia, imie, imia, siemie, siemia; but forms like cielę, siemię are kept alongside in many dialects.

Polish generalized the genitive singular ending -a; the only trace of *-e of *-n, *-nt stems is the softening of the final stem consonant: imienia, cielęcia, as they would have to be softened by a front consonant before -a from *-o and -jo stems spread. The Polish genitive of nouns like ciało, słowo, niebo, koło, oko, ucho does not continue extending *-s-, but adds the ending to the reduced form taken from the nominative: ciał-, słow-, nieb-, ok-, etc., therefore large-scale leveling occurred in the genitive: z błota, od sioła, z żyta, z miasta, od sidła, pątnictwa, obrzęda, sierca, słuńca, do morza; imienia, ramienia, cielęcia, skocięcia, nieba, oka (14th and 15th centuries). Only nouns suffixed with *-ьj- such as bicia, picia, miłosierdzia, pokolenia, weźrzenia, wiesiela had long/slanted -á from contraction of final *-ьj-a; this ending -á can be seen ni all dialects: śniádaniá, szczęśćiá, weselá, kázaniá, however slanting was not kept in the nominative-accusative plural, even though contraction of *-ьj-a > -á occurred in this position.

In the dative singular -u is used everywhere, taken from the original use in *-o and *-jo nouns leveling *-i in *-n and *-nt nouns (*imeni *telęti), but the softening effect can still be seen in the final stem consonants: imieniu, cielęciu, as -u was applied secondarily; a small number of exceptions occur, dziecięci, książęci; individual exceptions starting from the Middle Ages to now with -owi can be seen: imieniowi, południowi.

The instrumental ending -em is inherited *-jo and consonantal stem nouns continuing *-emь and *-ьmь: siercem, słuńcem, plemieniem, imieniem, dziecięciem, panięciem (14th-16th centuries). Polish has an additional innovated ending -im occurring in nouns suffixed with *-ьj- resulting from contraction of *-ьjemь: przyścim, wiesielim, badanim, rządzenim, pienim, wyobrażenim, miłosiedzim, cirnim (14th and 15th centuries), naczynim, malowanim, spustoszenim, pożegnanim, staranim, zdrowim, drżenim, pierzym, imienim (from imienie, “property”), rozumienim, obliczym (16th century); -im is used often until the end of the 15th century with very few exceptions, but over the course of the 16th century under influence of other neuter nouns that take -em it starts to be confused, initially rarely, and around the midpoint of the century more and more often, and towards the end it gives way as an archaism. The Proto-Slavic *-o stem ending *-omь was not kept in Polish, but based on masculine *-u stems (*-ъмь) as well as perhaps the rest of neuter nouns already in the prehistoric era they took -em: łęczyskiem, miastem, dziedzictwem, pogaństwem, źrzebrem, and secondarily (wtórny) złotem, gardłem, kadzidłem, winem (14th and 15th centuries), -em was added relatively late based on the fact that final consonants are not softened by it.

Proto-Slavic *-o stem nouns keep their inherited locative singular ending, that is -e < *-ě: mieście, prawie, mnożstwie, pogaństwie, gardle, jezierze, łonie, mięsie, żelezie; the only change that occurs is within nouns whose stems end in -k, -g, -ch, as until the end of the 15th century they take -e: w mlece, w jebłce, na rusze (15th century), this change was possibly spurred by a want to avoid stem alternations of k : c, g : dz, ch : sz, and sporadically already in the 15th century and commonly in the 16th century -u from the locative of neuter -e and -ę nouns is applied. Old *-jo stems lose original *-i and gain innovated -u, taken from masculine declension: siercu, słońcu, morzu, polu (14th and 15th centuries); etymological forms are seen exceptionally: morzy, siercy, słuńcy (14th and 15th centuries). -i can be seen somewhat more often in nouns suffixed with *-ьj-, therefore where -u comes from *-ьji: kazani, odpuszczeni, narodzeni, pisani, czynieni, umęczeni, wabieni, wiesieli, zdrowi (14th and 15th centuries), but innovated -u is used much more often: biciu, skryciu, miłosierdziu, przewodziu, wiesielu, myśleniu, obeźrzeniu, pokoleniu (14th and 15th centuries), and *-n and *-nt stems also take exclusively -u via analogy: imieniu, ramieniu, dziecięciu, cielęciu (15th centuries), and traces of original *-e can be seen in the softening of the final consonant.

Within the nominative, accusative, and vocative plural, nouns inherit -a Proto-Slavic: dzieła, jeziora, biodra, lata, świadectwa, sierca, miłosierdzia, założenia, ramiona, zwierzęta (14th and 15th centuries); titles of officials such as podstole, chorąże also have -a until the 16th century: podkomorza byli (15th century), later -owie or -e: chorążowie, podczasze, and in the accusative -e: ma pod sobą podchorąże.

The most frequent ending in the genitive plural is -∅, inherited after the loss of *-ъ for *-o, *-n, and *-nt stems as well as -ь of *-jo stems: lat, ust, stad, bogactw, skrzydł, zioł, sierc, miłosierdź, kazań, brzemion, imion, cieląt, książąt; some soft-stem nouns take -i||-y: podziemi, bezkrólewi, bezprawi, wezgłowi, poddaszy, obliczy, wybrzeży, podnóży, podwórzy, rozdroży, zaciszy - these are prepositional constructions built modeled on *-ьj- nouns such as danie, wiesiele, miłosierdzie; some deviations occur, some without a preposition: pustkowi, nozdrzy; some compounds: półroczy, and prefixed deverbals: narzeczy; on the other hand prefixed nouns with -∅ occur: zbóż, pokoleń, nieszczęść, or both endings: przedmieść||przedmieści, przysłów||przysłowi. The origin of these forms is uncertain and they are not seen in the Old Polish era; they could possibly derive -i from *-ьjь which occurred in the genitive of nouns such as bicie, przykazanie, miłosierdzie; but these nouns due to their semantic nature were rarely used in the plural, and when they were, they took -∅: kazań, miłosierdź, pokoleń, stajań, zbóż (14th and 15th centuries); this would mean that -i||-y is not an archaic reflex of *-ьjь but rather a newer ending taken by modeling on genitive forms like gości, kiści, koni, żołnierzy, koszy, kości, nocy. From the 16th-18th centuries -ów from masculine declension can be seen: piekłów, dziełów, cłów, stadów, gusłów, ogniwów, zwalisków, bagnów, igrzysków, niebiosów, which can also occur in dialects.

Before the 15th century the ending -om for the dative plural of various origins spreads: custom, dziełom, słowom, świadectwom, zwierzętom (14th century). Within old *-o stems it is inherited from Proto-Slavic and from here the tendency to level took over all other dative neuter forms removing the original prehistoric *-emъ in *-jo stems and *-ьmь in consonantal stems. In the 15th century the feminine ending -am sees some use: dziatkam (15th century), latam, słowam, krolewstwam, miastam, ciałam, pismam, przykazaniam, polam, obawieniam, pokoleniam, zwierzętam, jagniętam (16th century); it appears that this tendency was at its strongest from the transitional periods between the 15th century and 16th century and from the middle of the 16th century it starts to give way as Kochanowski doesn't use it at all, and it falls out of use with the end of this century, and the only used suffix becomes -om, sometimes with slanting -óm, like Kochanowski: latóm, drzewóm, książętóm, oczóm, uszóm.

Neuter hard-stem nouns in the instrumental plural, i.e. old *-o stem and consonantal stem nouns inherited -y in the Middle Ages and to the middle of the 16th century almost without exception: laty, pióry, żyty, ciały, zwierzęty, książęty (14th century); słowy, prawy, gasidły (15th century), drzewy, jarzmy, państwy, skrzydły, stady, zioły, bliźnięty, imiony, znamiony (16th century); -y is also used for nouns suffixed with -c(e): jajcy, siercy, mieśćcy. Old *-jo stems from the earliest times have -mi instead of *-i taken from masculine declension (synmi, gośćmi) and feminine (kiśćmi): polmi, miestcmi, wołańmi, zbożmi, pokoleńmi (15th and 16th centuries); -mi can sometimes be seen in neuter hard-stem nouns ending in a liquid consonant: piórmi (14th century); jeziormi, ciałmi, działmi; kołmi, prześcieradłmi, winmi, ramionmi (15th and 16th centuries). Before the 16th century -ami, from feminine declension, can be rarely seen: przedmieściami, pokoleniami, odzieniami (15th century); działami, piorami, kolanami, pętami, prawami, ziarnkami (first half of the 16th century); over the course of the 16th century this ending spreads to neuter nouns of various origin, and in the 17th century becomes the dominant form, -y and -mi forms can be seen later, but as archaisms, such as modern przed laty, innymi słowy.

Among three originally inherited locative plural endings, only -ech < *-ěchъ of old *-o stems sees wide use, however the ending *-ich < *-ichъ of old *-jo stems is not used, and the ending -ech < *-ьchъ of consonantal stems very rarely: niebiesiech, ptaszęciech (14th and 15th centuries); -ech sees dominant usage until the middle of the 16th century: błogosławieńśtwiech, piśmiech, skrzydlech, święciech, jaślech, okniech, drzewiech, stadziech, leciech, żeleziech, mieściech, czelech, cielech, słowiech (14th-16th centuries), but by the end of the 16th century it falls out of use. From the 14th to the middle of the 16th century all types sometimes take -och of masculine declension: prawoch, kolanoch, latoch, siercoch, mieścoch, poloch, znamienioch, imienioch, dobytczętoch, książętoch. Already in the Middle Ages -ach||-ách sees uses: swawidłach, siedliskach, państwach, bractwach, polach, przykazaniach, siercach, imionach, ramionach (14th and 15th centuries), and in the 16th century becomes the dominant ending in soft-stem nouns; in hard-stem nouns it sees co-usage with the ending -ech and by the end of the century entirely displaces it: Rej's Apokalipsa has a ratio of -ech to -ach of 33:9, and -ech occurs in Kochanowski's works exceptionally.

==== Declension of mixed nouns ====
Mixed noun declension are the result of semanticization (see § Nouns. They are considered an irregular declension.

There are two main groups of masculine nouns ending in -o: the first are diminutive nouns attested as early as the Middle Ages such as Mieszko, Jaśko, Walko, Dobko - these are most likely Polish innovations based on neuter nouns it is doubtful that these are the result of artificial latinization as this type of noun is also found in southern and eastern Slavic dialects. Later innovations of this type are given names such as Jasio, Kazio, Franio, etc. - all of them decline as masculine nouns. The second type are family names such as Jagiełło, Sanguszko, Matejko, Fredro - in the singular they are kept in masculine forms until the 17th century: Jagiełła, Sanguszka, Tarła; Jagiełłowi, Sanguszkowi; Jagiełłem, Fredrem, etc. and in the 17th century they begin to take feminine endings: Fredry, Fredrze, Fredrą, but archaic masculine forms can be seen in the 19th century.

Masculine nouns ending in -a include hard-stem nouns: wojewoda, sługa, starosta, mężczyzna, niecnota, monarcha, poeta, Kmita, Kostka; soft-stem nouns: sędzia, hrabia, rękojmia, kaznodzieja; names: Zawisza; and nouns ending in -c(a): rajca, zastawca, przyczyńca, złoczyńca, jedynowłajca - in the singular they generally decline according to feminine paradigms: wojewodzie, patriarsze (dative singular), rarely do they take masculine endings: patriotowi, stworcowi (dative singular). The nominative plural in the Middle Ages is usually from feminine declension: sługi, wojewody, patriarchy, starosty, mężczyzny, kaznodzieje, przyczyńce, but already in the 15th century, more often in the 16th century, and predominantly from the 17th century the masculine endings -owie, -y occur: starostowie, rybitwowie, poetowie, Kostkowie, sędziowie, margrabiowie, zdrajcy, naśmiewcy. The genitive plural originally had a normal, feminine -∅ ending: wojewod, starost, poet, panosz, sędź, kaznodziej, mężobojec, radziec, and modern mężczyzn, but hard stems over the course of the 15th century and soft-stems from the beginning of the 16th century take the masculine ending -ów, also in dialects: lutnistów, wróżbitów, Kmitów, sędziów, złoczyńców. Other plural forms in the Middle Ages take feminine endings, and from the 16th century share their fates with masculine endings, with dative -om, instrumental -ami, and locative -ach.

Collective forms such as bracia, księża are now understood to be the nominative plural of brat, ksiądz, but originally were nominative singular with a collective meaning: the original ending was *-ьja and contracted to -á: braciá, księżá; however already in the earliest epoch these forms can syntactically connect with adjectives, pronouns, and verbs in the plural due to their collective meaning: uźrzą bracia twoi i moi, naszy mili bracia, and based on this forms like bracia became the nominative plural, braci as the genitive plural (like gości), and also the accusative plural. These new associations were further supported by soft-stem nouns like gość lead to innovations in other cases: braciom, braćmi, braciach - this process probably took place in the Middle Polish era. Dialects not only keep old braciá, księżá (as the plural), but also created new muzykanciá, adwokaciá, swaciá.

Neuter nouns ending in foreign -um from the earliest times don't decline in the singular, and in the plural they decline like neuter nouns, except in the genitive plural, where -ów is used.

==== Traces of the dual ====
The Proto-Slavic dual forms in historic Polish show a slow but complete disappearance, and in the oldest texsts they aren't necessarily used to mark dualness or parity, but rather were used instead of normal plural forms, and only objects naturally in pairs, that is certain body parts were expressed in the dual: oczyma twym uznamionasz, uciekła pod jego skrzydle (14th and 15th centuries), but conventional parity, i.e. frequent but not necessary, and incidental parity are accompanied by the numeral dwa or oba, and the loss of a dual meaning is demonstrated by examples such as trzema palcoma, trzema dnioma. The end of relative productivity of dual forms lands the second half of the 16th century, with more forms occurring the further back in time, and individual instances can be seen in the 17th century. Dual forms in Polish are generally inherited from Proto-Slavic forms with only some leveling and simplification.

In the nominative and accusative dual:

1. In the masculine:
  1. -a < *-a: dwa szczyta, męża dwa, dwa kmiecia, dwa miecza, dwa konia, dwa młodzieńca, oba końca, oba przyjaciela;
  2. -y < *-y; *-u stems: dwa syny, dwa woły, sometimes replacing -a via association: rozdzieliłasta się dwa braty;
2. In the vocalic feminine:
  1. -e < *-ě in hard stems: dwie rybie, dwie żyle, dwie kiełbasie, dwie siekirze, dwie strzale, dwie fidze, dwie dziewce, obie naturze; ręce is kept in a plural meaning in the nominative and accusative;
  2. -i||-y < *-i: dwie duszy, dwie świecy;
3. In the consonantal feminine:
  1. -i||-y < *-i: dwie gałęzi, dwie piędzi; oczy and uszy belong here despite being neuter nouns, as they were originally *-i stems (compare Lithuanian akis ausis) and create their dual according to the feminine consonantal dual;
4. In the neuter:
  1. -e < *-ě in hard stems: dwie lecie, dwie świetle, dwie ciele, dwie słowie, obie wojsce, obie kolanie, also the Old Polish innovation oce usze;
  2. -i||-y < *-i in soft stems : dwie poli, dwie słońcy.

In all declensions paradigms in the genitive and locative inherited -u occurs: dwu rowu, dwu rodu, dwu aniołu, dwu koniu, dwu miesięcu, na obu boku, na dwu łanu, o dwu strożu; ręku, dwu dziewku, obu dziedzinu, na obu stronu, we dwu ziemiu, obu wsiu, we dwu sieniu; dwu pokoleniu, na dwu drzewu; the locative ręku is kept in a singular meaning; genitive oczu uszu in the plural.

Dative and instrumental dual:

1. In the masculine:
  1. -oma < *-oma of *-o stems generalized to all types; *-ema from *-jo stems; *-ъma from *-u stems; *-ьma from *-i stems: dwiema ławnikoma, dwiema biskupoma, dwiema kroloma, dwiema strumienioma, obiema końcoma;
2. In the vocalic feminine:
  1. -ama < *-ama rękama, dwiema dziurkama, dwiema dziedzinama, obiema niewiastama;
  2. -oma from the masculine: rękoma, dwiema drogoma, dwiema winnicoma, dwiema wieżoma; rękoma is kept in a plural meaning, see also Declension of masculine nouns in the instrumental plural;
3. In the consonantal feminine there are no instances of inherited *-ma < *-ьma; the preserved and inherited from Proto-Slavic instrumental forms oczyma uszyma are exceptional and built by adding the etymological ending -ma to the full nominative forms oczy uszy:
  1. -ama based on vocalic feminine nouns: dwiema częśćiama;
  2. -oma based on masculine nouns: dwiema rzeczoma, obiema garścioma;
4. In the neuter:
  1. -oma < *-oma from *-o stems, generalized instead of -ema < *-ema from *-jo stems: kolanoma, dwiema latoma, dwiema wojskoma, czołoma, dwiema morzoma, nozdrzoma.

=== Pronouns ===
Polish makes many changes to the pronouns of Proto-Slavic: *onъ *ona *ono become personal pronouns, *jь sees a considerable restriction in use, *sь is lost except in derivations like dzisiaj, latoś, the indeterminate ending -ś, or fossilized phrases like do siego roku, ni to, ni sio.

==== Masculine and neuter singular of demonstrative, possessive, and adjectival pronouns ====
Changes in declension in the masculine and neuter singular comes from a Proto-Slavic phonetic process of the influence of *j on the following vowel, resulting in *-jo > -je, *jě > ji, *jъ > jь, *jy > ji; the Polish tendency was to level both types according to the soft-stem endings.

In masculine nominative, after the loss of yers Polish gained -∅: ów, on, mój, nasz. The pronouns *tъ, *jь were extended with *nъ: *tъnъ, *jьnъ. ten remains in use, jen falls out of use over the course of the 16th century. There are no changes to the neuter nominative and -o is inherited.

The genitive form -ego spreads via leveling to the soft-stem: mojego, also contracted mego, twego, swego, naszego, jego, owego, onego, tego; the late age of the leveling is evidenced by the hardness of the consonant near the front vowel -e. The archaic exception togo is attested three times in Kazania świętokrzyskie, once as a masculine genitive, once as a masculine genitive-accusative, once as a neuter genitive, onogo (genitive-accusative). Masovian dialects have slanted tégo based on adjectival declension.

In the dative the ending -emu spreads via leveling to the soft-stem: mojemu, also memu, twemu, swemu, naszemu, jemu, owemu, onemu, temu; the late age of leveling is evidenced by the hardness of the consonant near the front vowel -e; there is a single instance of archaic tomu (neuter dative) in the Holy Cross Sermons.

The accusative is equal to the nominative. The archaic accusative masculine form ji is the reflex of Proto-Slavic accusative *jь and was rare already in the 15th century, in the 16th century it is more often replaced by the form go, probably the result of reduction of the genitive form jego, as the stress was originally on the last syllable; another trace of this old accusative form can be seen in prepositional constructions + -ń such as zań, weń, przedeń, as this -ń < *njь is the old accusative of *-jь with epenthetic n, which arose in Proto-Slavic from combinations such as *sъn jimь, *vsъn jimь, *kъn jemu as the result of perinteɡration, i.e. reinterpreting the -n as belonging to the next word. Already in the earliest texts the masculine genitive is used as the masculine accusative if the pronoun refers to a man or is in a syntactical phrase with a masculine-personal noun: tego poniża a onego powysza; tego prześladował jeśm; oddalił jeś bliźniego mojego, gdy pwam w boga mego (14th and 15th century).

The instrumental from the oldest era to the middle of the 15th century the ending -im or -ym, generalized to the soft-stem, dominates: moim, aso mym, twym, swym, naszym, tym, onym, owym etc. and in the 15th century the instrumental ending begins to mix with the locative ending -em. The pronoun jen in the instrumental (j)im is kept until the end of the 15th century and is kept now in the fossilized construction im - tym; in the 16th century nim occurs next to im and nim becomes the only form used in the 17th century.

In Old Polish the locative ending -em, generalized based on soft-stem declension, is used: w tem, w samem, w żadnem, w jem, na naszem, then in the 15th century the instrumental ending -im, -ym sees use in the locative, therefore the instrumental and locative had distinct endings in the earliest era and begin to merge starting from the second half of the 15th century into one form with the fluctuating form -im, -ym or -em. Orthographic works attempted to deal with this situation, for example Kopczyński arbitrarily introduces differentiating genders without regard to case instead of the old differentiating of case regardless of gender and sets -im, -ym in the instrumental/locative masculine and -em in the instrumental/locative neuter., and the orthography reform of 1936 recommends the forms -im, -ym for both cases and both genders.

==== Feminine singular of demonstrative, possessive, and adjectival pronouns ====
No changes occurred in the nominative and the ending is -a: ta, owa, moja, also ma, twa, swa, nasza, etc.

The Proto-Slavic genitive endings *-ojě, *-ejě contract in prehistorsic Polish into -é: oné mowy, z této ziemie, z oné straszné postawy, z té powieści, żádné sprawy, słáwy twé, swé głowy (14th-16th centuries); młodzieży mojé, macierze mojé, w jé świętem żywocie, od nié, twojé miłości (14th-16th centuries). Next to these forms already in the oldest texts the genitive form -ej occurs often, arosing via assimilation to the dative and locative etymological -ej, and was further phonetically motivated as -é sounds similar and probably had a phonetic final -j, [ej]: pełność jej, nieprawdy mojej, dziewki twojej, z ręki twej, męki swojej, dusze swej, dziedziny waszej, wszej ziemie (14th and 15th centuries). As a result of raising slanted é towards y or i as well as the loss of final j a third ending occurs sporadically: -y after hard consonants or -i after soft consonants: z takowy powieści (16th century), połowa większa flotty ony zginęła (17th century), ty ji pieniądze (15th century), fortuny swoi (17th century).

The dative and locative share the ending -ej, which is the reflex of Proto-Slavic soft-stem ending *-eji, which simplified by removing the final vowel; tendencies to level also meant that this ending replaced hard-stem *-oj(i) in prehistoric times: krasie mojej, prawicy twojej, prawdzie swojej, naszej duszy, wszej postaci, bydlić będę w niej, we śmierze mojej, w drodze twojej, w sławie swojej, w ziemi naszej, na drodze tej, w tej trojcy (14th century). The ending -e for the dative-locative also occurs via assimilation of the dative-locative to the genitive, e.g. in dative: teto kaźni posłuszen, jebyło to imię, anjoł jest ci się je był ukazał, ucieczmy się k nie (14th century), ktoré jął dziękować, ojtczyznie swé (16th c.); and in the locative: w oné stajni, w té nędzy, w niéktoré epistole, w ktore jest wypisan, w swe przyjaźni, po śmierci twoje (16th century). These forms were not kept as the opposite leveling won out, that is leveling the genitive to the dative-locative. The difference between genitive do te głupie baby and dative-locative ty głupi babie was only kept in southern Silesian, Lesser Poland, and in various places in the western periphery of Greater Poland.

The Polish accusative has -ę < *-ǫ: jedzinaczkę moję, rozciągnąłeś rękę twoję, drogę swoję, prze chudobę naszę, wszytkę radę, nawiedzi winnicę tę (15th century) with one exception, ją odjęli ją, na drodzęe jąż wybrał (15th century), after a preposition nię wpadli w nię, przez nię mężnie poczynali, na nię ciężko p rzyszło (15th and 16th ceneturies). Only in the second half of the 19th century is the accusative -ą taken from the feminine accusative adjectival form; Małecki considers it a mistake, saying in 1879 “Formy moją siostrę, naszą, waszą, czyją matkę, których niektórzy pozwalają sobie w mowie i piśmie, są to błędy stanowcze. Odwoływanie się do brzmienia ją, wyjątkowo urobionego, nie byłoby tu na miejscu” (The forms moją siostrę, naszą, waszą, czyją matkę, which some people allow themselves in speech and writing, are definite errors. Referring to the sound of ją, exceptionally developed, would not be appropriate here). The archaic accusative form tę remains, but more often in writing than in speech, and is often replaced now with tą.

Polish has the instrumental ending -ą < *-ojǫ, *-ejǫ and remains from the oldest times without changes: między bracią moją, z dziedziną twoją, podpira swoją ręką, nade wszą ziemią, wszystką myślą. The form ją sees use in the 16th century: czarty ją (wodą), odganiając; abyśmy się ją zapalali, and after prepositions since the oldest times nią, which in the 16th century begins to displace ją, and since the 17th century is the only form.

==== Plural of demonstrative, possessive, and adjectival pronouns ====
The masculine nominative is -i from the oldest times or -y after functionally soft nouns, but only among masculine personal nouns: ci co znają, oni zginą, nie będą powyszeni sami w sobie, wszytcy rzeką, jiż wykupieni są nieprzyjaciele moi, kapłani twoi, oćcowie naszy (14th century); the range of this form was wider in the past, and until the 17th century it occurred exclusively in masculine animate nouns: ci ćwicy, niektorzy ptacy, wszytcy ptacy (16th century), however during the Old Polish era it could occur also with inanimate nouns if the syntactically dependant noun had an ending originally nominative in origin, and not accusative as nominative: wszytcy krajowie, wszytcy końcowie, śladowie moi, sądowie twoi, wozowie twoi, ołtarze twoi, dniowie naszy. Outside of these conditions the accusative acts as the nominative, in soft stems -e: palace twoje, grzechy twoje, dni nasze (14th century); in hard stems -y||-i (after k g): wszytki kraje, wszystki sądy, ty pieniądze (14th century), ony ogni, samy zwony, ty sądy wszytki narody, ony losty (16th century); from the 17th century this ending gives way to -e taken from the soft declension, giving the modern forms te domy, owe sady, one dni, etc. The inherited masculine personal forms naszy, waszy (< *naši *vaši), e.g. oćcowie naszy, ojcowie waszy, naszy wymowce polscy, bracia naszy mili (14th-17th century) fall out of use over the 17th century and the innovations nasi wasi, occurring from the beginning of this century are from the nominative masculine personal plural adjectival declension, where thematic *š alternates with soft ś. The feminine soft-stem nominative continues uninterrupted as -e < *-ě: moje nogi, kości moje, ścieżki twoje, wargi nasze; the hard-stem ending is kept until the 17th century as -y: wszytki drogi (14th century), ty rzeczy, rzeczy, ktory ku ubiorowi należą (15th century), wszytki rozkoszy moje, jeśliby się ony (rozmowy) podobały, ty rzeczy, samy Amazony (16th century); sporadically from the 15th century, then more often from the middle of the 16th century, and commonly from the 17th century and used today is the ending -e: te, owe, które etc., introduced based on the nominative soft-stem declension, also influenced by the adjectival nominative feminine plural ending. The neuter rarely takes -a in medieval texts: a są ta ista słowa zmowiona (Holy Cross Sermons), wszytka działa jego, lata moja, świadectwa twoja, lata nasza, książęta wasza (Sankt Florian Psalter), and more often forms that assimilated to the nominative inanimate masculine and feminine nouns occur with -y in hard stems: tyto książęta, only drzewa, wszytki źwierzęta (15th and 16th centuries); soft-stem nouns take -e, which is used today: nasze dusze, moje starania. Over the course of the 16th century hard stems also take -e based on soft-stem declension: te, one, owe pola, and this state continues from the 17th century without change.

In the genitive and locative -ych, -ich after k g, is kept without change in hard-stem pronouns and -ich, -ych after hardened consonants, in soft-stem pronouns: od tych co mnie gonią, jarzmo jich, jedno z nich, drog mojich, snow twojich, dział swojich, podług grzecohw naszych (14th century); -ich is the reflex of Proto-Slavic *-ichъ, but -ych in hard stems is an innovation instead of Proto-Slavic *-ěchъ, which arose via tendencies to assimilate hard-stem forms to soft-stem ones, which, as can be seen, was influenced also by singular forms.

Historic Polish has the dative plural -ym, -im after k g, in hard stems and -im, -ym after hardened consonants, in soft stems: przeciwo tym, daj sie wiesielić wszytkim, posłał jim, mołwić k nim, wrogom moim, obietam twoim, łajaniam twoim, duszam swoim (14th and 15th centuries; -im is inherited from Proto-Slavic *-imъ, and -ym is an analogous innovation like the genitive; the only kept archaism with etymological -em < *-ěmъ is the form ciem in the Sankt Florian Psalter: prawda jego nad syny synowymi ciem, co chowają ustawienie jego (page 102). As in the instrumental singular and plural, the dative sporadically shows fluctuation of the vowels i, y, or e before m: wszytkiem żywem utnę szyję (15th century); niektórem zdrowie dawał, ku tem paniam, anioł rzekł k niem, powiedział jęm, soli tám tém krájóm dosyć dawa (16th century); mieśce pannie z panem młodym dajcie, jemci z sobą być (17th century).

Within the accusative, masculine and feminine soft-stems have inherited -e < *-ě without change: zbawiony uczynisz je, oświeci czyny moje, poznaj drogi swoje, prze sądy twoje, kaźni twoje miłował jeśm, pod nogi nasze, nad syny wasze (14th century); in hard-stems the etymological reflex -y remains until the 16th century: w ty jiż sie nawracają, rozproszy ony, zgubisz wszystki, widział jeś wszytki syny, tyto krole powalił, wszytki ludzie potracisz, prze ty dwa bogi o ony gwałty, zowią ty czas (14th and 15th centuries); over the course of the 16th century -y gives way to soft-stem -e through leveling, which is in common use from the 17th century.

The neuter ending -a is partially kept: odpuści wszytka dopuszczenia, słuszał jeś wszytka słowa, położył jeś rammiona moja, miłował jeśm świadectwa twoja, ostawią cudzym bogactwa swoja, położcie sierca wasza, ta słowa pisze (14th century), but more often, already in the oldest texts, forms modeled on the masculine and feminine accusative -y in hard stems and -e in soft stems: słyszali wszytki słowa, na wszytki zwierzęta, słyszeć ty słodkie słowa, ty drzewa ujrzał, strzec serca i ciała nasze, we świadectwa twoje (15th century), and in the 16th century, -y forms slowly give way to -e from the contemporary accusative soft-stem of pronouns and all adjectives; from the 17th century to now it is the only form.

Before the 16th century -imi, -ymi after hardened consonants, occurs for all genders, and -ymi, -imi after k g, in hard stems: z tymi, tymi słowy, miedzy przyjacioły mojimi, z panoszami swoimi, nad grzechy naszymi, ze słzami mojimi, z ciały swojimi (14th and 15th centuries); -imi is the direct reflex of Proto-Slavic *-imi and -ymi is an innovation based on prehistoric leveling of expected forms such as *ciemi, *owiemi (<-ěmi) based on moimi, naszymi, with keeping the hardness of the stem in most cases, but in the Sankt Florian Psalter, p. 119, 6 the exceptional form cimi, z cimi jiż są nie naźrzeli p okoja, był jeśm pokojen occurs. In the 16th century -emi sees more and more use resulting from phonetic changes of -ymi, -imi and strong lowering of y, i before m: -ymi, -imi, > -émi > -emi: témi káráktermi, obyczajmi swemi, miedzy niektoremi uczonymi, z inszemi się uda, z szledziami... ktoremi chłopy zarzucają, miedzy inszémi rzeczami, wszystkiemi siłami, miedzy wszytkiemi inemi niebezpieczeństwy, z swemi państwy (16th-18th centuries). Old -ymi and -imi remain in equal use next to -emi then in the 19th century orthographic works artificially regulate this by limiting -ymi, -imi originally to the masculine gender, later only masculine personal, and -emi to feminine and neuter or masculine non-personal: tymi chłopcami, psami, temi robotnicami, książkami, dziećmi, and now only -ymi, -imi are written, but -emi can still be heard, but there is no functional difference between the two, as one can hear both temi kobietami and temi chłopcami.

==== Remnants of the dual of demonstrative, possessive, and adjectival pronouns ====
Relatively few dual forms are seen til the end of the 15th century; they fall completely out of use in the 16th century.

Masculine pronouns in the nominative and accusative take -a: pręt twoj i dębiec twoj ta jesta mnie ucieszyła, Jozef z Maryją jesta ona była przyszła, dwa syny twa moja będzieta (14th and 15th century); sama dwa krola biłasta się (16th century). Feminine hard stem pronouns ake -e: wypuści światłość twoję i prawdę twoję cie jesta mie przewiedle; o nie poczęlesta płakać (14th and 15th century); soft-stem feminine pronouns take -i: ręce twoi gospodnie uczynilesta mnie, ręce swoi umyje, rozciągnąłem ręce moi (14th and 15th century). Neuter hard-stem pronouns take -e: za cie dwieście grzywien; soft-stem pronouns take -i: widziele oczy moi, oczy moi mdlesta byle, podźwigł jeśm oczy moi (14th and 15th century).

For all genders the ending -u is used in the genitive and locative: świeca oczu moju, cień skrzydłu twoju, w działu ręku twoju, działu ręku naszu, nie posawił tu dwu wołu, w oczu naszu, w ręku twoju, w tu dwu niedzielu (14th and 15th century).

For all genders the ending -ima||-yma for the dative and instrumental is used: dam sen oczyma moima, zawoław farao Mojżesza i Arona rzecze jima, zawoła Mojżesza a Arona a rzecze k nima, rzekł swyma żonama, uszyma naszyma słyszeli jesmy, swyma rękama dotknąć, patrzyć moima oczyma (14th-16th century).

==== kto, nikt(o) and co, nic(o) ====
All modern forms of kto and nikt(o) continue from the oldest times with the exception of the locative, which originally was kiem: przetoż je nam chwalić słusza, w kiem jeść koli dobra dusza (15th century); the only change from Proto-Slavic was in the locative, as locative and instrumental later merged, with instrumental form kim being established. The instrumental form kim instead of expected cem < *cěmь arose based on soft-stem instrumental pronouns and adjectives; the locative kiem is also assimilated to them instead of *komь; all other cases are inherited: kto < *kъto, kogo < *kogo, komu < *komu.

The only changes that occurred in historic Polish for co, nic(o) are in the instrumental and locative; the instrumental before the 16th century was czym, and the locative czem; later there was a clear tendency to use one form for both, but their forms are mixed, czym or czem; orthographically in the 19th century the forms czem, czém, czym are used, and in the end czym won out. In comparison to Proto-Slavic there is one difference, which is that co < czso is used in the nominative and accusative, and derives from the Proto-Slavic genitive form *čьso||*česo; the original nominative-accusative form čь was phonetically weak by the loss of yers, meaning that Polish could use the form czso, which was rendered unnecessary by the new genitive form czego, created from prehistoric times. The old accusative form cz is kept in Polish only supported by a preposition, przecz, zacz, (w ni)wecz.

==== Personal pronouns and the reflexive pronoun ====
Most forms are inherited:

1. Nominative: ty < *ty, my < *my, wy < wy;
2. Genitive: mnie < *mene||*mьne, ciebie < *tebe, siebie < *sebe, nas < *nasъ, was < *wasъ;
3. Dative: mnie or mi < *mьně, tobie or ci < * tebě||tobě or *ti, sobie or si or se < *sebě||*sobě or *si; the forms mnie, tobie, sobie are used when stressed, but eastern Poles near the border may use them unaccented. The forms mi, ci, and si (rare in Old Polish) and dialectal or colloquial se (<sobie) from the 18th century are enclitics.

Other forms and developments include:

1. The nominative ja < já < *azъ underwent prejotation and shortening; in prehistoric times probably both jaz and ja existed next to each other, and the use of one or the other depended on the initial sound of the next word, then ja spread in use and jaz is noted only once in the Sankt Florian Psalter, p. 108, 3: ale jaz modlił jeśm się, most certainly a Bohemism;
2. The enclitic use of accusative forms as genitive: mię cię, się, and the opposite anaology of genitive as the accusative in accented forms;
3. In the accusative, in an accented position genitive forms mnie, ciebie, siebie appears; some texts keep old inherited mię < *mę, cię < *tę, się < *sę, but in enclitic position only mię, cię, się or nasalless mie, cie, sie were used. This differentiation occurred in dialects: Greater Polish and Masovian had only nasal forms mię, cię, się, but both nasal and nasalless forms occurred in Lesser Poland depending on the neighboring term, near a verb mie, cie, sie, not near a verb, especially after a preposition, mię, cię, się. In the 17th century full forms appear after prepositions, mnie, ciebie, siebie, but only in the 19th century the current situation establishes itself, and only these forms in this position are possible. Eastern Poles near the border may use mnie, ciebie, siebie, even unstressed;
4. The accusative forms nas, was are genitive in origin, and the original forms ny, wy are lost, but poświęci ny attested once in Gniezno Sermons;
5. Instances of dual forms are attested: nominative first person dual wa: wszystko co wa przysięgła (15th century), osieł z wołem: wa nie umiewa oracyj (16th century). wa is an innovation instead of expected wie < *vě probably under influence of the first person dual ending for verbs;
6. The genitive-locative naju < *naju, waju < *vaj and the dative-locative nama < *nama, wama < *vama. The forms naju, waju, nama, and wama were kept in some dialects, but these forms now have a plural meaning: u naju, u waju meaning u nas, u was.that subtly is quickly fading.
7. się/siebie is defective and lacks a nominative; it is also often used to create a mediopassive voice or impersonal passive voice;
8. Dative forms of pronouns are used to create the dativus ethicus;
9. The Proto-Slavic pronouns *onъ *ona *ono were originally demonstrative pronouns and become personal pronouns in Polish; their oblique forms are suppletive from *jь;
10. Like nouns, pronouns also differentiate animacy;
11. Genitive forms of third person pronouns become possessive pronouns.

=== Adjectives and adjectival pronouns, numerals, and participles ===
Proto-Slavic adjectives, except possessional adjectives, had definite forms, used when a noun was definite, and indefinite forms when a noun was indfinite; the definite form was built from the indefinite form extended with the pronoun *jь. Polish did not keep any marking of definiteness, but instead changes their semantic function; the indefinite form is possible only in the predicate, and only the definite form is used attributively. Only a few vestigal exceptions exist.

Proto-Slavic adjectives stems could also be soft or hard; continued into Polish.

==== Proto-Slavic indefinite forms ====
The declension of indefinite adjectives consisted of adding the ending appropriate to the noun declension to the adjective, i.e. masculine and neuter hard-stem adjectives take masculine and neuter endings of *-o stems, and masculine and neuter soft-stem adjectives atke feminine *-a stems, feminine soft-stem adjectives take feminine *-ja endings: star stara staro, stara stary, staru starze, star starę staro, starem starą, starze; this declension is sometimes called a nominal declension because of this. Mostly nominative forms are kept as a result of the fact that it was possible to use indefinite non-possessive adjective forms only in the predicate.

Indefinite forms differed from definite forms initially only in length and later in clearness and slanting: the feminine nominative singular and neuter nominative plural took short, clear -a in the indefinite, and long, slanted -á in the definite, similarly, the neuter nominative singular of soft stems and feminine nominative-accusative-vocative plural of soft-stems took short, clear -e in the indefinite and long, slanted -é in the definite.

The difference of length or slantedness were not marked in manuscripts, and prints marked it only sometimes and often incorrectly; Łazarz's print marks entirely correctly distinguishes indefinite forms: Twym rozumem ták miernie ziemiá usadzoná, że na wiki nie będzie nigdy poruszoná... Pełná jest wszytká ziemiá twej szczodrobliwości (where á marks clear a); in Wietor's print from 1542 “Sąd Parysa” (á = clear a, a = slanted a): pożywaj wesela, pókiś młodá; ja bábá stára, ale miedzy młodzieńcy jára - młodá” - in the first example is a predicate with an indefinite form, and in the second an attributive in a definite form; but a loss of the sense of distinguishment can be attested via sentences such as: przymiż odemnie jabłko, Wenus młodá, or at a different point in time: miła pani Wenus - both examples have an attributive in a definite form; similarly not clearly marked is a in the sentence: jestem ci bárzo godna, w wieńcu bárzo cudná, where in both cases the adjective is in the predicate and should have indefinite clear -á. In the masculine nominative plural in both forms the ending is -i||-y.

Already in the oldest epoch indefinite adjectival forms in the attributive are rather rare and exceptional, from the 16th century they are not seen at all except adjectives with the formant -ow and -in. Only possessive adjectives with the formant -ow from personal names or common nouns dominate in the short form in the attributive, and in the predicate adjectives from the oldest epoch take either the definite or indefinite form; from the 16th century indefinite forms are rare. The adjectival participle in the predicate has an indefinite form to the end of the 15th century; fluctuation begins in the 16th century, and from the 18th century definite forms dominate almost exclusively. Both in the attributive and in the predicate adjectives of various word-formation build appear in indefinite forms, most often with the formant -ow- in the attributive, with the formant -en||-n in the predicate. Some adjectives from the oldest epoch show a particular tendency for non-compound forms in the predicate, now they mainly have this form exclusively: rad wart, or optionally: pełen, wesół, zdrów, winien, gotów, łaskaw. Traces of indefinite declension is kept in a few categories of terms, which have since long stopped being adjectives in Polish:

1. Above all else adverbs endings in -o: młodo, staro, boso, mało, cicho, blisko, wysoko, daleko, which are the old nominatives or accusatives neuter singular (some innovated soft-stems based on hard-stems occur, e.g. głupio, tanio, dostatnio; adverbs with -e: dobrze, pięknie, źle, dokładnie, which some consider the old singular locatives and others consider to be formed under influence of the nominative neuter singular of comparative adjectives; forms with w such as wkrótce, wcale are undoubtedly from the old locative;
2. Prepositional phrases in the genitive singular: z cicha, z chłopska, z głupia (frant); in the dative: po cichu, po polsku, po prostu, in the genitive plural: z dawien (dawna); these are all sued adverbally;
3. Placenames formed with -ów, -owa, owo, -in, -yn, -ina, -ino, -sk, -*jь: Kraków, Częstochowa, Wejherowo, Teresin, Szczuczyn, Lusino, Radomsko, Przemyśl, Poznań, Oświęcim, which were originally possessive adjectives with an attributive function naming an ellided noun such as gród, osada, wieś, pole, etc.;
4. Nouns referring to women from masculine surnames or masculine professions with the ending -ina||-yna: Sroczyna, starościna (compare matczy matczyna); in historic Polish these were nouns, originally also possessive adjectives.

==== Proto-Slavic definite forms ====
The nominative and accusative masculine singular in hard stems take -y, and in soft stems -i inherited from Proto-Slavic *-yjь, *-ijь contracted to y or i; the nominative and accusative neuter ends in -e < -é as the result of contraction of -oje in hard stems and -eje in soft stems.

The masculine-neuter genitive singular is -ego or -égo contraction from *-ajego, however -aje- normally contracts to -a, not -e, the cause of this is uncertain; one theory is that it is a crossing of the contraction process with a secondary, but decisively active process of analogical assimilation to the genitive form of soft-stem pronouns. The same happened in the masculine-neuter dative singular, as the ending -ému can not be derived from normal contraction of the original cluster *-ujemu in forms such as *starujemu, *pěšujemu, as the expected form would be -umu; the fluctuation of -emu||-ému is explained by, as in other similar positions, the neighboring m. The masculine-neuter instrumental singular inherited -ym, -im after k g, from *y-imъ or also -im, -ym after hardened consonants from *-i-imъ.

The masculine-neuter locative singular has -em inherited from *-ě-jemъ, *-i-jemъ. the pressence of final hard consonants in hard stems despite being in front of front vowels, i.e. starem, młodem, długiem, dalekiem, instead of *starzem, *młodziem, *dłudzem, *dalecem, is explained with leveling to the locative stem to the stem found in other cases. The above state of -ym||-im in the instrumental and -em in the locative occurs only during the Old Polish era; as with § Pronouns, these forms begin to mix with one another already in the 15th century; the mixing of -ym||-im and -em continues today in spoken speech, with -ym taking the advantage in both cases and genders. Orthographical regulations of the end of the 18th and 19th century go in both directions, or, as proposed by Szylarski and Kopczyński, an artificial rule of -ym||-im in the masculine for both cases and -em in the neuter for both cases is suggested, or, as suggested by Kryński, only -ym||-im is allowed in both cases and genders; the orthographical reform of 1936 establishes this last option.

The feminine nominative singular inherits -a < -á as the result of contraction of -aja.

The feminine genitive singular infrequently takes -é until the first decades of the 16th century; this can be considered the reflex of the Proto-Slavic *-yjě, *-ějě with contraction contracted, possibly supported by the process of assimilation to pronominal genitive forms ending in -é, but already in the Middle Ages this form starts to mix with the dative, which even sees more use than the genitive ending: z ręki nieprzyjacielowej, głosem trąby rogowej, bojaźni bożej, rzeczy krzywej, ode wszelikiej złej drogi, z wysokości świętej (14th and 15th centuries). The base for this mixing was probably the convergence of old -éand -ej; over the course of the 16th century the original genitive ending -e was entirely removed and replaced with the dative form. Due to a strong tensing of é before j the endings -yj||-y, -ij||-i can be seen.

The feminine dative and locative singular ending is -ej; -ej in hard stems is from Proto-Slavic *starěji with a loss of final -i disappearing, as in pronouns, as well as leveling of the final stem consonant according to its sound in other cases, thus not *starzej, *dalecej, *żywiej, but starej, dalekiej, żywej. -ej in soft stems, such as bożej, lisiej, can not come from Proto-Slavic *lisьji, *boži-ji, as these would give Polish *lisij, *bożyj; this is explained with assimilation to the dative and locative forms of pronouns like tej, mojej, etc. as well as to hard-stem adjectives: starej, mocnej, etc. Sometimes the genitive replaces the dative and locative - in the dative: służbie ludzkie, naświętsze matce, and in the locative: w pamięci wiekuje, w robocie ludzkie (14th-15th centuries). Forms with -yj, -y occur as well: o ktoryj literze, w dzisiejszy koronie, w wieczny miłości (16th century). Dialects in southern Silesia and the very south of Lesser Poland sometimes retain examples of distinguishing the dative-locative and the genitive: s te strony, do te głupie baby - ty drugi babie.

The feminine accusative singular keeps -ą w without change as the result of contraction of final *-ǫjǫ in Proto-Slavic. There are many examples in older literature with the ending -ę taken from noun declension: dobrę nadzieję (16th century), całę noc, nowę służbę (17th century), tę zdobycz ogromnę, stronę słabę (18th century), chiefly occurring in texts written by authors from Ukrainian and Belarusian borderlands and can be seen today in dialects, mainly in the eastern borderland, Masovia, sporadically in Greater Poland; if in the given dialect -ę changed to -ą and then further to -a, one can hear examples such as widza ta nowa książka instead of widzę tę nowę ksiażkę.

The feminine instrumental singular ending is -ą from *-ǫjǫ < *-ǫjejǫ.

Among nominative plural forms which are in a syntactic phrase with a masculine noun, from the old times there are two endings: -i, -y after hardened consonants, and -e; -i||-y derive from contraction of Proto-Slavic final *-iji and are used with masculine animate nouns, both masculine persona and masculine animal: krolowie ziemscy, ptacy pierzaści (14th and 15th centuries) and can also be seen when the adjective is used with an inanimate noun if the nominative ending is used generally with animate nouns: cedrowie libańscy, nowi szczepowie (14th and 15th centuries). From the 18th century -i||-y is kept only as the masculine personal ending which is concurrent with modern Polish. -e come from the masculine accusative and is used when the adjective is in a syntactic phrase with an inanimate noun, and from the 18th century with masculine non-personal nouns, i.e. masculine inanimate and masculine animal.

The nominative feminine plural form is -e <-é as the result of contraction of final *-ějě in soft-stems and contraction and assimilation to the pronominal masculine nominative in hard-stem forms such as *staryjě.

The neuter nominative has in the Middle Ages two endings, -á and -é; -á derives from contraction of *-aja and was common in the 14th century and in the next century falls out of use: lesnaa; the other ending -é is introduced in the 15th century based on the masculine inanimate and feminine endings, and from the 16th century becomes the only ending, which remains unchanged til now. Thus significant changes occurred in Polish: instead of three Proto-Slavic gender forms in the nominative plural, the masculine, feminine, and neuter, two forms are established: -e forms with feminine, neuter, and inanimate masculine nouns and -i forms with animate masculine nouns, giving two declensional genders in the plural, masculine animate and non-masculine animate (męskożywotny and niemęskożywotny), and from the 18th century this reshapes into a contrast of the masculine personal gender and the non-masculine personal gender (męskoosobowy and niemęskoosobowy).

The genitive and locative inherit -ych, -ich after k g, in hard-stem adjectives and -ich, -ych after hardened consonants, in soft-stem adjectives from contraction of word-final Proto-Slavic *yjichъ, *ijichъ. In dialects from the Old Polish era to now the ending -ech, -éch occurs: dobrech, młodech (Old Polish); téch cornéch (dialectal). The dative plural of hard-stem adjectives has -ym, -im after k g, in hard stems and -im, -ym after hardened consonants, in soft-stems, which are the reflexes of Proto-Slavic with contraction of word-final *yjimъ, *ijimъ. As in other cases, the dative sometimes shows a fluctuation of -y||-i before m, which results in the ending -em||-ém: jałmużnym nędznem nie dawał, potomkom albo bliższem umarłego, wszystkiem żywem utnę szyje, czujnem pastyrzom (15th century); ubogiem sirotam dopomoży, rycyrskiem rzeczam, skalném a górnem wodam, chudem pachołkom (16th century).

The masculine and feminine accusative plural ends in -e <-é in soft stems and is the result of contraction of *-ějě in hard-stems from contraction of original *-yjě, and also assimilation to the accusative ending of pronouns and soft-stem adjectives; -e was used even when the adjective was in a syntactic phrase with an animate nouns and only from the 16th century does the genitive begin to displace the accusative in this function.

The neuter accusative plural had the ending -á as the result of contraction of *-aja: oprawia sierca ludzka, widzieli działa gospodnowa (14th and 15th centuries). Like the nominative, these forms give way as early as the 14th century to -e based on the feminine accusative as well as the accusative of pronouns; this process finishes in the 15th century, so in the 16th century the state which matches modern Polish dominates. Finally in the 16th century -e spreads in the masculine, feminine, and neuter plural, in this century however its usage is then restricted, as for adjectives in a syntactic phrase with a masculine personal nouns the genitive functions as the accusative. Through this two genders are formed in the plural, masculine personal and non-masculine personal.

The instrumental plural of hard-stem adjectives in the Middle Ages has the ending -ym, -imi after k g, and soft-stem adjectives have -imi, -ymi after hardened consonants. Already in this epoch the ending -emi can be seen: nad ludźmi dobremi, ale więcej nade złemi; okrutnemu dręcząc mękami (15th century) and subsequently spreads in the following centuries. Even though -emi was used much more often than the more rarely used -ymi||-imi, Kopczyński recommends to limit it to non-masculine personal instrumental; in the 19th century this rule is either maintained or recommended, e.g. by Kryński only -emi; The 1936 orthographic reform establishes -ymi for all genders.

Medieval Polish still sees vestigial use of dual forms, and sporadically as archaisms they occur also in the 16th century; it is not always possible to determine if these forms come from non-compound or also compound forms, as they often differ only in vowel length, and Old Polish writing does not mark this. Examples include:

1. Nominative: dwa bracieńca barzo bogata, żesta naga;
2. Accusative: dwa młoda pachołki pojmie, uczynił bog dwie świecy wielicy;
3. Genitive: dział ręku ludzku, dwu lepszu i starszu;
4. Locative: na dwu mału miastku;
5. Dative: ku uszyma faranowyma;
6. Instrumental: skorkama koziełkowyma, dwiema świadkoma lepszyma, przed oczyma gospodnowyma (14th and 15th centuries); czarnéma oczéma (Kochanowski), oczyma nie choryma albo ślepyma, ale zdrowyma (16th century).

=== Numerals ===
Ordinal numerals declines as adjectives; the cardinal number jeden declines like an adjective, and tysiąc declines like a noun.

==== Cardinal numerals ====
The history of Polish cardinal numbers can be split into three epochs:

1. The first is the period before the 16th century, in which inherited forms are kept;
2. The middle epoch is from the 16th century to the middle of the 19th century, arising from mutual influencing of inflectional types taken from the past. The strongest influence comes from dwa, certainly as the result of the frequency of its use. This influence appears earlier among 5–19, later for 50-90 and 500–900. From this innovations containing the characteristic ending -u begin in the 16th century in the genitive and locative and then in the 17th century in the dative and instrumental. -u spreads so much even effecting dwa, changing its original shape. Under this pressure inherited forms give way. The most resilient to this change was the distinct instrumental ending -ą, but it too eventually disappears;
3. The last is from the middle of the 19th century til now, characterized by a significant limitation of the formal differentiation of cases due to the spread of the innovation -u and its multifunctionality. This is connected with a syntactic process: the relation of the unit which the numeral enters into with the counted noun to the other parts of the sentence is marked (apart from 1–4) not in the numeral, but in the noun. Therefore, the inflectional form of the numeral becomes syntactically indifferent (obojętna); it can therefore become immobilized, remaining a pure expression of number; therefore, the -u form -u can fulfill its such diverse tasks. Another characteristic tendency is the separation of masculine personal nouns. The very early forms trzej, dwaj, czterej arise from it. From it the usage of genitive for accusative appears, at the earliest, already before the 16th century, for the numeral dwa, for others less than 100, over the course of the 16th century, for 100 and its derivatives in the 18th and 19th centuries. A century later (17th) the usage of genitive for the nominative begins.

===== 2, 3, 4 =====
Polish inherits the nominative and accusative dwa from *dъva and continues in the masculine non-personal: dwa domy, dwa stoy, dwa psy, but within the masculine the form dwa occurs without exception before the 16th century and is retained in an increasingly narrow range to the 19th century, then in place of limited dwa the innovation dwaj is introduced in the 16th century. The origin of the form dwaj is not yet well explained; it arose perhaps under influence of trzej, or it could be a crossing of dwa and the collective numeral dwoje. Next to dwaj from the middle of the 17th century the genitive forms dwu, dwóch, dwuch take on a nominative and accusative function for masculine personal nouns.

The feminine nominative and accusative form dwie in inherited from *dvъě, but this form in the neuter is kept only until the beginning of the 17th century, from which time is replaced by dwa under the assimilating influence of the ending -a for count nouns, which removes the dual form: dwie lecie > dwie lata > dwa lata. In northern dialects this process went further, as there dwa is the only form, so not only dwa konie, dwa okna, but also dwa krowy, dwa kury; in Silesia, and exceptionally elsewhere, the Old Polish state is preserved: dwa konie, dwie cielęta, dwie okna, dwie krowy.

The genitive and locative form dwu is inherited from *dъvoju, but next to it the innovations dwuch, dwoch, dwóch appear, all noted from the 16th century formed based on trzech, czterech as well as the locative noun ending -och.

The dative inherited form dwiema is inherited from *dъvěma for all genders is kept until the end of the 17th century, but already in the 16th century the rare innovation dwoma based on the dative dual of masculine nouns appears, then in the 17th century the innovation dwom appears under influence of the dative plural noun ending and the forms trzem, czterem. Sporadically from the 17th century dwóm with slanted ó before m appears, as well as dwum. Kopczyński allows the form dwóm, and in modern times can often be heard in colloquial speech; in the 18th century the form dwu begins to see use and gains priority over the course of the 19th century, and can be seen today.

The instrumental form dwiema is inherited from *dvъěma for all genders remains in use until the end of the 18th century; this form remains in use when used with a feminine noun, but its use here is not obligatory. The new form dwoma appears as early as the 15th century and spreads in the 17th and 18th century in all genders. Kopczyński allows both forms dwiema and dwoma; over the course of the 19th century grammarians recommend the form dwoma to be used exclusively in the masculine and neuter and allowable in the feminine. The form dwoma arose from influence of the instrumental dual ending -oma for nouns, which the numeral accompanied: dwiema domoma > dwoma domoma > dwoma domami. The forms dwóma and dwuma can sporadically be seen.

The numeral oba, obadwa, and obywa has the same development.

Nominative forms of trzy in medieval Polish continue Proto-Slavic: trze < trzé < *trьje as well as trzy < *tri, but are used differently; the form trze is generally very rare and is used exclusively with masculine personal noun: trze panowaie, trze bogowie, trze oćcowie, trze dochowie, trze synowie, trze mężowie, trze mędrcy (14th and 15th century); then in the 15th century the form trzej appears, which probably arose via phonetic changes to trzé where é tensed and became trzej; thus with masculine personal nouns the old form trze develops into trzej and trzech.

With other nouns the form trzy < *tri occurs from the oldest times to now; with masculine non-personal nouns this is originally accusative, and with feminine and neuter - nominative.

The old genitive form trzy from *trьjь can be seen over the course of the 15th century: trzy męży, od sześciset a trzy tysiącow, temu nie trzy lat, trzy grzywien; but as early as the end of the 14th century the innovation trzech, originally the locative form, appears, based on pronominal and adjectival declension, where the locative and genitive share a common form.

The dative from the oldest times to now uses the form trzem from *trьmъ and in the 16th century the form trzema, based on dwiema, can be seen rarely.

Before the 16th century only one, Proto-Slavic accusative form existed for all genders: trzy < *tri, but from the 16th century this form is very rarely used with masculine personal nouns as in this position genitive forms see use, and then without exception through the 19th century to now.

The instrumental of all genders has before the 16th century the form trzemi, a prehistoric innovation arising as the result of leveling the inherited form *trzmi from *trьmi with the forms trze, trzech; the forms trzémi and trzymi sometimes occur as well. The form trzemi is kept through the 16th and 17th century, but becomes increasingly less common due to the spreading of the form trzema, which arose based on dwiema.

The locative form trzech is inherited from *trьchъ without change.

In the oldest Polish texts the stem cztyrz- can be found for cztery from *četyre with the loss of medial *-e-, then over the course of the 15th century rz gives way to r taken from the genitive form cztyr < *četyrъ as well as forms like cztyrnaście, cztyrdzieśi, where rz desoftened via normal sound changes, and for two centuries forms with rz and r are in parallel use, sometimes even used alternatingly by the same writers; in the 17th century forms with r gain exclusive use. The thematic vowel also changes with relation to the Polish process of changing the old clusters ir(z), yr(z) to ér(z)||er(z), beginning already at the beginning of the 15th century; for the next centuries the pronunciation with é was kept, as some 19th century grammarians recommended cztyry, cztyrnaście. Rarely or dialectally the form sztyr(z), szter(z) could be seen (compare dialects) as the result of simplifying the cluster czt-.

Until the beginning of the 16th century, the masculine-personal form cztyrze from *četyre sees rare use: ci cztyrze synowie; concurrently the accusative : cztyrzy from *četyri sees use in the nominative next to this quickly disappearing form: czytrzy krolowie and this form from the oldest times is the only one used with non-personal masculine nouns. For masculine nouns an innovation in the 15th century occurs in cztyrzej, cztérzej, czterzej, czterej, and this forms spreads in the following centuries and in the 19th centuries grammarians recommend this form in this position, then finally towards the end of the 17th century genitive forms take on a nominative function.

The feminine and neuter cztyr(z)y, cztér(z)y, cztery from *četyri remain without change.

The old genitive cztyr from *četyrъ is found in 14th and 15th century texts and next to this already rare form from the end of the 14th century the innovation with -ech sees use, which arose by leveling the genitive and locative based on pronominal declension; the reflex of this form is czterech, which is the result of phonetic processes and morphological leveling, and remains in use for the entirety of Polish history.

The dative form cztyrzem, cztérem, czterem from *četyrьmъ exists from the oldest times, and sporadically in the 17th century the forms czterema, czteroma based on dwiema, dwoma occur.

The accusative cztyrzy||cztérzy||cztery from *četyri for all genders is inherited;wWhen used with masculine personal nouns from the 16th century to now the genitive as accusative sees use.

The instrumental appears in a different form from the 17th century; before then the form cztyrzmi or cztyrmi from *četyrъmi appears, which remains in dialects. The similar innovation czterma formed with -ma taken from the forms dwiema, trzema, sees use in the 16th century, is used by various writers of the 17th-19th century, and normative sources now proscribe its use, as sometimes it comes from dialects. An even fuller assimilation to the forms dwiema trzema is the innovation cztyrzema > czterema, used from the 16th century, and from the 19th century most grammarians recommend this form. Other innovations include czteremi from the end of the 16th to 18th centuries, the result of crossing the forms cztermi and czterema and czterzoma or czteroma, used from the 16th to 17th century, based on dwoma.

The locative cztyrzech (> czterech) from *četyrьchъ continues -ech.

===== 5-10 =====
Numerals from 5 to 10 have the same declension, and before the 16th century continue the Proto-Slavic state, that is they had a declension typical of old *-i stem feminine nouns e.g. kość, pięść, nić; from the 16th century a reshaping of the inflection occurs.

The nominative continues the Proto-Slavic state, thus pięć < *pętь, sześć < *šestь, siedm < *sedmь, ośm < *osmь, dziewięć < *devętь, dziesięć < *desętь; until the end of the 17th century they are also used with masculine personal nouns, but from the 1640s forms with -u arise in this position based on dwu.

The old inherited genitive with -i is seen until the 18th century, but next to this already in the 16th century forms with -u according to dwu appears and gains dominance over -i in the 17th century and from the 18th century become nearly exclusive.

The dative keeps the inherited Proto-Slavic form before the 17th century, piąci, siedmi, dziesiąci, etc., then in the middle of the 17th century forms with -u begin to appear, and in the 18th century spread. This innovation occursed probably due to traditional awareness of congruent forms in the genitive and dative in this declension, and the dative began to take -u after the genitive. From the 16th to 19th century forms with -om can be seen based on dwom. The 16th century grammarian Piotr Stoiński recommends forms such as piąciam, dziewiąciam based on the feminine dative.

The accusative from the oldest times is equal to the nominative, including with masculine personal nouns until the 16th century, and is still possible in the 19th century but from the 16th century genitive forms with -i or -u begin to see use in this position and ultimately won out in the 18th century.

The longest-dominating and relatively most common instrumental form is the old inherited one with -ą; Kopczyński and a number of 19th century grammarians recommend this form. From the 17th century -u see rare use, arising based on the general tendency to spread -u in different cases of numeral declension of various types, then over the course of the 19th century this form gains the advantage. Another innovation, seen today as well, is -oma arising in the 16th century based on dwoma.

The locative has the old inherited form with -i, but already in the 16th century innovated forms with -u appear, motivated by assimilation to the locative form dwu; this form becomes the only form in the 19th century, however forms with -i still occur in dialects. Other innovations appear, such as pięcich, sześcich, pięciuch, sześciuch.

===== 11-19 =====
These words in Proto-Slavic were formed with the phrase *na desęte which in historic Polish has four reflexes: na dzieście, naćcie, naście, nacie; na dzieście is the oldest and very rare, it arises from phonetic development in prehistoric times from *nadziesięcie. the old vocalic-locative stem, which loses ę in fast speech, the next development is naćcie < naťście < naćście < nadźście in which also the second vowel of *dziesięć disappears; and as a simplification of naćie, nacie sees sporadic use. The form naście developed the latest, maybe as further simplification of ćć. Before the 16th century naćcie and naście appear with equal strength, later naście gains exclusive use. From an inflectional point of view originally the first element declined and the second element was indeclinable, but Polish later makes changes towards the opposite, making the first element indeclinable and declining second element.

Nominative forms did not change in their use with a masculine non-personal noun; before the 16th century they were used with masculine personal nouns, often in the 16th century, and less often in the following centuries; however 19th century grammarians allow it, but from the 17th century forms with -u appear and remain to this day resulting from the tendency to spread -u forms in other numerals.

The genitive sees 3 periods, the first being before the 16th century with a dominating traditional form, the second being the 16th century with a few various coexisting innovations, and the third being the following centuries where one form is established.

In the genitive, before the 16th century etymological forms are present with the genitive of the numerals 1-9 and an indeclinable -naście; this continues relatively often in the 16th century, however over the course of the 16th century the sense of inflection with regard to word-formation of the two elements blurs, a result of which various innovations arise where the first element is either indeclinable or also takes a genitive form, and the second element sounds -naścia, taken from the genitive of nouns: wojska było do jedenaścia set koni, ze dwanaścia miast, względem szesnaścia powatów, od dwunaścia set lat, więcej piąciunaścia tysięcy. Under influence of the genitive of 5-10 innovations with -naści appear, but rarely, and finally the -u forms enter use based on dwu and become widespread: dwunaściu synów, and then a hard consonant appears before -u giving -nastu; this is potentially motivated by dwu, where -u is also after a hard consonant and also potentially the form dwudziestu. Forms with -nastu appear in the 16th century and spread, ultimately gaining exclusive use.

The dative appears in its etymological form before the 16th century: dwiemanaćcie apostołom, but from the 16th century this form changes shape; the form dwiemanaćcioma modeled on dwoma appears, piąciamnaście with the feminine dative plural in the first element; piąciomnaście with the masculine dative plural, and in the 17th century the dominative and ultimately exclusively used form is -nastu. Next to it in the 17th and 19th century the innovations based on the theme dwunast- appear based on dwom: szesnastom chorągwi.

The accusative has the same form as the nominative and remains til now unchanged when used with a non-personal masculine noun; this form was used with masculine personal nouns until the 17th century, but already in the 16th century the genitive -u forms as the accusative spreads in this position.

The instrumental form appears as its etymological reflex, with the instrumental of 1-9 and then -naście: z dwiemanaście podlejszymi. This form dominates before the 16th century and is frequent in the 16th century, next to it however in the 16th century a number of innovations appear: dwiemanaćcioma, dwiemanaścioma, dwunastoma - where the second element takes its ending based on dwiema, dwoma; dwiemanaćciemi - with the pronominal instrumental ending; dziewiąciąnaścią - where both elements take the feminine instrumental ending -ą; jedennaścią, dwunaścią, trzynaścią, siedmnaścią - with an indeclinable first element and a second element declining according to feminine nouns and the numerals 5–10. In relation to the increasingly spreading form with -nastu in the genitive, dative, and locative, the instrumental also reshapes the stemto -nast-: przed siedmnastą wieków; these forms are used from the 17th to 19th centuries. Sporadically in the 16th century and rarely in the following centuries, more often in the newest form of Polish innovations like dwunastu, szesnastu occur.

The locative initially keeps the inherited form: we trzechnaście grzywnach, but in the 16th century two innovations occur: one is the form such as we dwunaści, where the second element takes -i from the numerals 5-10 and the second is a rarer form such as dwunaściu which becomes more and more frequent, and from the 18th century only the form such as dwunastu; both take -u, which spreads in this way in different cases of different types of numerals.

===== 20-90 =====
The nominative-accusative form of 20 in the oldest texts to now is dwadzieścia, perhaps the result of assimilation of the original second element dzieści or dzieście to the first element dwa. In texts from the 14th and 15th centuries the form dwadzieście appears, perhaps based on the rare forms such as trzynadzieście, pięćnadziescie. The form dwadzieści from *dъvadesęti is attested in 1425. When used with a masculine personal noun the nominative in the second half of the 17th century and the accusative in the 16th century see the genitive: dwudziestu, which is the current state. The genitive and locative dwudziestu remains in use without change from the oldest times and derives from *dwu dziesiętu, in turn from Proto-Slavic *dъvoju desętu, that is the genitive-locative dual of consonantal stems, this form probably motivated -u after a hard consonant in the declension of the numerals 11–19.

The dative in the 17th century had the form dwudziestom, the form before this is unattested; ultimately the modern form with -u spreads: dwudziestu.

The instrumental in old texts appears as a combination of the instrumental dual dwiema and based on masculine hard-stem nouns in the instrumental dual: dziestoma, but already in the Middle Ages and especially from the 16th century various in novations appear: dwiemadziesty with the first element taking the masculine instrumental plural of nouns; dwadzieścią, dwudzieścią with the second element declining like the numbers 5–10; dwudziestą being an innovation with the same ending ą but added to the genitive theme and is the most frequently used form from the 16th to the second half of the 19th century; from the 17th century the form dwudziestu begins to be used (przed dwudziestu lat); 19th century grammarians recommend the form dwudziestoma, which arose based on dwoma. These last two forms dominate today.

The nominative-accusative has trzydzieści from *tridesęti, rarely czterydzieści||szterydzieści (16th and 17th centuries) from *četyridesęti, normally cztyrdzieści||czterdzieści, that is with a simplified first element; with non-personal masculine nouns these forms are used from the oldest times without change, but from the 17th century genitive forms as nominative-accusative appears and from the 19th century these forms are recommended for exclusive use in this position. The forms trzydzieście, czterdzieście, trzydzieścia, czterdzieścia, trzydziesiąt, czterdziesiąt appear exceptionally, the results of various levellings.

The genitive already in the oldest period has a few alternate forms: trzydzieści||trzydziesiąt||trzechdziesiąt; czterdzieści||czterdziesiąt - it is possible that the forms trzydziesiąt and czterdziesiąt are the reflexes of Proto-Slavic *trьjьdesętъ, *četyrъdesętъ, however in view of the alternation trzy||trzech in the genitive, trzechdziesiąt should be considered secondary to trzydziesiąt, but these could be innovations based on piącidziesiąt. The forms trzydzieści, czterdzieści either contained the genitive in the first element, and the second element has the genitive plural -i ending from feminine consonantal noun declension, or is the nominative as the genitive: trzydziesiąt grzywien, cztyrdziesiąt groszy, do trzechdziesiąt lat, podle liczby czterdzieści dniów, ode trzydzieści lat, o pozdychaniu czterdzieści tysięcy Turków. The forms trzydziesiąt, trzechdziesiąt are used until the end of the 15th century, the forms trzydzieści, czterdzieści are kept still in the 16th century, then the forms trzydziestu, czterdziestu appear in this century under influence from dwudziestu and in agreeance with the general trend to spread -u forms, and from the 17th century this form spreads and becomes the only one.

Dative historically are little attested - before the 16th century: trzem dziestom, cztyrzem dziestom, with the dative in both elements, but trzem dziesiąt is probably based on piącidziesiąt; in the 16th-17th centuries: trzydziestom, czterdziestom with the second element formed analogously to the dative plural; probably from the 17th century the forms trzydziestu, czterdziestu are used, these two forms, trzydziestu and trzydziestom, czterdziestu and czterdzistom dominate equally in the 19th century, in the last decades trzydziestom, czterdziestom fall out of use.

The instrumental forms show much variety - the archaic form is trzemidziesty, trzymidziesty, which is close to Proto-Slavic *trьmi desęty; this form is noted in the 15th and 16 centuries; sometimes the first element declines based on dwiema: przed trzemadziesty lat (16th cenetury). The instrumental forms like cztyrmi dziesiąt has the genitive in the second form from influence from piącidziesiąt. The form trzymidzieści is uncertain in origin. Before the 16th century sometimes the nominative functions as the instrumental: książe miedzy trzydzieści. From the 16th century there is a tendency to make the first element indeclinable and give them the forms trzy-, czter-, and to make the second element declinable; based on piącią, dwanaścią, dwadzieścią forms like ze trzydzieścią Kozaków, z czterdzieścią okrętów appear, the result of this identical form are forms with the ending -ą added to the genitive theme: z trzydziestą jezdnych, przed czterdziestą dwoma laty. From the 17th century the instrumental also takes the modern ending -u (trzydziestu, czterdziestu), and in the 19th century the ending -oma based on dwoma (trzydziestoma, czterdziestoma); both forms today are allowed.

Similarly the locative before the 16th century has various tendencies: we trzechdziestoch, we czterdziestoch, po trzechdziesiąt, so the locative in both elements or in the second, or in the first. Relatively frequently the locative is equal to the nominative: na trzydzieści oślętoch. From the 16th century the genitive form is also used, probably not without influence from dwudziestu: we trzydziestu koni; this form dominates over the course of the last three centuries.

The nominative-accusative of numerals from 50 to 90 continues the Proto-Slavic state: pięćdziesiąt < *pętь desętъ, sześćdziesiąt < *šestь desętъ, siedmdziesiąt < *sedmь desętъ, ośmdziesiąt < *osmь desętъ, dziewięćdziesiąt < *devętь desętъ; the first element has the nominative of 5-9 and the second has the genitive plural; they connect not only with masculine non-personal, like today, but also with masculine personal, but already in the 17th century a process of replacing the nominative and accusative in this context with the genitive such as piącidziesiąt, pięciudziesiąt, pięćdziesięciu occurs and completes in over the course of the 19th century with the winning form being pięćdziesięciu.

The oldest genitive form is etymological, that is the genitive of 5–9 with -i and the genitive plural dziesiąt: nie wzięła piącidziesiąt grzywien, nie przeszła lat sześcidziesiąt, około dziewiącidziesiąt (15th-16th centuries). Via the innovation of -u among 5–9, it also appears in the first element of 50-90 and becomes more frequent in the 17th and 18th century continuing into the 19th century, but already in the 17th century a different tendency is visible, that is the numbers 50-90 take a synthetic build, the first element is indeclinable and the inflectional ending occurs on the second element, which sheds its traditional form -dziesiąt and takes the genitive plural dziesięci, certainly under influence of the numerals 5-10: z ośmdziesięci czterech, and soon the spreading structure with -u appears here: siedmdziesięciu, infrequently in the 18th century and gains exclusive use in over the course of the 19th century. The rare form, noted in the 19th century, sześciudziesięciu appears via crossing forms like sześćdziesięciu and sześciudziesiąt. At various times the nominative functioning as the genitive occurs.

Not many examples of the dative exist - it remains in the inherited form such as piącidziesiąt for a long time. 19th century grammarians recommend a few forms: pięciudziesiąt, pięćdziesięciu, ane so equal to the genitive; pięciudziesięciom, pięćdziesięcom based on dwom, and forms with -u establish themselves.

The original instrumental is kept all the way up until the 19th century: z piąciądziesiąt dwiema braciej; next to it some innovations appear: siedmdziesiącią trzema łokci (17th century), z sześciudziesiąt dragonii (18th century), z ośmdziesięciu ludźmi, z ośmdziesięcioma ludźmi (19th century). Sometimes the nominative appears for the instrumental.

The old locative lasts until the end of the 16th century: w sześcidziesiąt, but already in the 16th century forms with -u in the first element appear. From the end of the 18th century another innovation such as pięcdziesięciu appears, initially met with antagony by, e.g., Kopczyński, but ultimately becomes common.

===== 100-900 =====
Until the 19th century 100 has an inherited neuter hard-stem declension: sto, sta, stu, ście, stem - innovations appear in particular cases next to these traditional forms, for example in the nominative and accusative with masculine personal nouns the genitive stu enters use in the 19th century; in the genitive the form stu exists from the 17th century and exclusively in the 19th century; in the instrumental, next to stem, the rare innovation stą occurs based on pięcią, dwunastą, dwudziestą and stoma, based on dwoma, both seen from around the 17th century and known by 19th century grammarians; in the 18th century there was also stm, the result of contamination of stoma and stem, perhaps under influence of trzema, and in the locative next to ście already in the oldest era there was the form stu and this last one wins out; the presence of ście is noted by 19th century grammarians, but only in cases when the numeral appears alone without a noun.

The nominative-accusative of 200 continues Proto-Slavic *dъvě sъtě; until the 19th century it's also used with masculine personal nouns, and from the 18th century the genitive takes this function.

The genitive inherits dwustu from *dъvoju sъu; this form can be seen before the 16th century, later this form disappears and forms like dwuset, dwochset, dwuchset, under influence of trzechset, piąciset, appear, finally in the 19th century dwustu reappears as an innovation based on the spread ending -u.

The dative has dwiema stoma, dwom set, dwustom, dwiestom, dwiestu, dwustu - the oldest form dwiema stoma continues the Proto-Slavic dative dual, innovations decline either the first element, or the second, or take popular -u in the second part and an indecinable first part.

The instrumental in the Middle Ages has the original form dwiema stoma, then under influence from trzemisty, cztermisty the form dwiema sty appears in the 16th century; via leveling to other cases that contain -set, the forms dwiema set or dwoma set appear, following pięcią stą the form dwiestą sometimes occurs, and based on dwoma, pięcioma, the forms dwustoma, dwiestoma; among these various forms noted by 19th century grammarians, the final exclusive form is dwustu.

The locative keeps the original shape dwustu from *dъvoju sъtu throughout the entire history of Polish; from the 16th-19th centuries secondary forms created based on the locative of 500–900 with -set occur: we dwuset lat, w koni dwuchset.

The nominative and accusative of 300 and 400 inherit Proto-Slavic *trisъta and *četyrisъta; to the middle of the 19th century they are used with all nouns, from that time masculine personal nouns begin to use the genitive trzechset or trzystu and czterechset or czterystu.

The genitive continues the genitive of both elements etymologically, therefore initially trzyset, cztyrset, then in the middle of the 19th century the analogous forms trzystu, czterystu appear, originally limited to masculine personal nouns, they spread more and more and in the newest Polish they are in exclusive use.

The old datives forms trzem stom, czter(z)emstom||czytr(zem)stom were initially used, then under influence of the dative of the numerals 500–900 in the 16th century innovations appear: trzem set, czterem set; and see sporadic use still in the 19th century; 19th century grammarians note the form trzystom, in the end the innovations trzystu, czterystu see the most use.

The old instrumental is seen still in the 18th century, its first element contained a various instrumental form of trzy, cztery, and the second element is the instrumental plural sty: trzemisty, trzemasty, czteremasty, z czterzóma sty, z trzoma sty, then based on piąciąset in the 18th and 19th centuries the form trzema set occurs and from the second half of the 19th century trzystu and czterystu are in common use.

The most archaic locative form is found in Bible of Queen Sophia: we cztyrzech stoch leciech - earlier the second element contained the genitive form set under influence of 500–900, and this is the dominating form from the 16th century up to the end of the 19th century, then in the 19th century the innovation with -u occurs: trzystu, czterystu and becomes the exclusive form at the end of the century.

The nominative-accusative of 500-900 til now has the original shape: pięćset, sześćset, etc., having in the first element the nominative or accusative of 5-9 and the second having the dative plural set from *sъtъ; these forms are used with masculine personal nouns until the end of the 19th century in the nominative and with the accusative until the end of the 18th century, later the genitive appears in these positions.

The genitive until the 17th century has the inherited form piąciset, ośmiset, dziewiąciset, etc. and in the 17th century an innovation with -u in the first element begins to be used and this form becomes the only one.

Early forms of the dative for 500-900 are unattested.

The instrumental until the second half of the 19th century has its old form: z piącią set koni, z siedmią set pieszych, z piąciąset janczarów, piąciąset kopami and 19th century grammarians recommend this form; from the end of the 17th century an innovation with -u in the first element begins to see use: pięciuset, and the dominance of this form lands in the second half of the 19th century.

The locative keeps until the 16th century its old shape: w piąciset, but already in this century forms with -u in the first element begin to be used: w sześciuset, w pięciuset, and these forms are kept for the following centuries to this day.

==== Collective numerals ====
Polish inherits collective numbers from Proto-Slavic; dwój, obój, trój and the rare cztwiór directly continue Proto-Slavi; cz(t)wor with -or after a hard consonant and pięcior with -or after a soft consonant are a Polish innovation. Collective numerals have two types of declension: the first contains dwój, obój, trój, which decline in three genders and two numbers and three numbers according to the possessive pronouns mój, twój, thus dwój, dwoja, dwoje, dwojego, dwoje||dwojej, dwojego, dwojemu, dwojej, dwojemu, dwój, dwoję, dwoje, dwoim, dwoją, dwoim, dwojem, dwojej, dwojem, dwoi, dwoje, dwoja||dwoje, dwoich, dwoim, dwoje, dwoje, dwoja||dwoje, dwoimi, dwoich; the second type is nominal and contains from czwór up; from the beginning of the 15th century a new type appears resembling neuter nouns: nominative and accusative dwoje czworo; under influence of the remaining cases the innovation dwojgo appears; genitive dwojga czworga and the alternate form -ega; dative and locative dwojgu czworgu; the dative sometimes shows -om; instrumental dwojgiem czworgiem - the characteristic trait of this new type is the extension of the theme with -g. The exact history of development of collective forms is uncertain due to a small number of examples; perhaps numerals like dwój, especially czwór, have their etymological declension to the end of the 14th century, lose their full liveliness and distinctiveness in declined forms, but forms like obojego can be seen still in the 19th century in August Bielowski’s introduction to Samuel Linde’s Dictionary of 1854, then in place of these disappearing forms a new kind arises, collective numerals in the neuter with a nominal declension. According to H. Grappin's hypothesis the group with the suffix -or, which is used less simply because the need to use such numerals was rare, was subject to influence of the livelier group like dwój, obój; the genitive of czwora under influence of dwojego takes -g- and thus arises the innovation czworga; this in turn influences dwojego reshaping the form to the already rare dwojega and then the common now dwoja and from the genitive forms with -g- move to other cases.

==== Indeterminate numerals ====
The word wiele is a nominative accusative form of the adjective *wiel, wieli;vVery often, especially before the 17th century, one can see indeclinability of wiele.

The nominative accusative wiele like now, and near masculine personal nouns wielu, based on dwu, which becomes obligatory only in the newest Polish; the genitive wiela was original; from the 16th century wielu based on dwu; the dative wielu is the main and uninterruptedly dominating form; in the middle of the 16th century wielom based on dwom appears, but in the 18th century is rare and falls out of use in the 19th century; the instrumental has the hold instrumental adjectival form of *wiel(i), namely wielmi, wielimi, which are very rare, and wielmi is rather an adverb in the meaning wielce and in the 15th and 16th century the form wielim and especially wielem see use, from the middle of the 16th century to the 19th century the form wielą becomes popular, formed based on pięcią, from the 17th century the form wielu (according to dwu) and wieloma (according to dwoma) spread, and they ultimately are kept to this day; the locative wielu is without change; the accusative plural wiela was used from the 14th century in the function of various cases.

In Middle Polish the word tyle has the genitive form tyla from the 16th century; instrumental tylą and locative tylu from the middle of the 17th century, the rest of the forms in the second half of the 18th century; the nominative-accusative non-personal masculine ultimately in use; the masculine personal form and all other cases tylu; instrumental tyloma - ile sees a similar development.

The Proto-Slavic form was *kolьko gives kolko, which reshapes into kielko under influence of jele, tele, appearing in the oldest texts; In turn kielko, based on the alternations jele||ile, tele||tyle changes to kilko, used in Polish from the 16th to 19th century and the formations kielka, kilka appear in the second quarter of the 16th century and ultimately establish themselves in the language. A change to kielko, kilko is visible in the form of -o > -a, but the causes and conditions for this areuncertain - it is possible that the influence of the adverbially used siła was at work here, and that word was undoubtedly influenced by kilka, which resulted in the innovation of siłka in the meaning of an indefinite numeral; also unclear are the formations kielo, kiela, kilo, kila, which lack -k-; kielo kilo is in use from the middle of the 15th century, kiela kila from the 16th century and remain until the end of the 17th century. These formations are often indeclinable all the way to the 19th century, but when it declines, it took the following forms:

1. In the genitive in the oldest times -a, from the 16th century -u;
2. In the dative in the 16th century -em; in the 17th and 18th century -om, and from the 19th century to now -u;
3. In the instrumental in the 16th century -em, then -ą as the main suffix all the way to the 19th century, -oma from the 17th century and today still, -u from the middle of the 17th century becomes more and more frequent and today is almost exclusive;
4. The locative is without change and has -u.

The noun siła begins to be used in the function of an indeterminate numeral in the 15th century, but until the end of the 18th century it is predominately indeclinable - If it declines, the most common form for all oblique cases and the nominative for masculine personal nouns is siłu, according to dwu; the accusative siłę in the function of an adverbial of measure begins to appear in the 17th century as the nominative; the form form siłka appears following kilka.

The words para, trocha from the 17th century act as indeterminate numerals; the accusative in the function of the nominative with a meaning of an adverbial of measure appear: parę, trochę, and in other cases -u spreads, characteristic for the declension of numerals.

The word mało is the nominative-accusative neuter form of the adjective mał; from the 15th century to the 17th century it has the following forms:

1. Genitive mała, seen in modern Polish in the fossilized phrase bez mała; later mału;
2. Dative mału like the fossilized phrase po mału
3. Instrumental małem
4. Locative male or mału.

In the 18th century mało becomes an indeclinable numeric adverb.

==== Fractional numerals ====
The numeral pół is etymologically from the old *-u stem noun: *polъ; from its declension only the genitive singular remains, połu and the accusative plural poły in some archaic phrases na poły, w poły, przez poły in the meaning “halfly”; it can be used as a prefix and also appears in fractions like półtrzecia as the first element, and the second element is the genitive of an ordinal numeral according to their non-compound oblique gender: pół(w)tora pół(w)tory, półczwarta półczwarty, półtrzecia półtrzecie||półtrzeci etc., exceptionally in the feminine -ej of the compound declension: przez półtorej godziny, na półdziesiątej piędzi; sometimes forms with -u occur: półtoru łokciu, w półtrzeciu lat, od lat półtrzeciu tysiącu.

A few other fractional meanings are expressed with nouns: połowa, trzecina or trzecizna, ćwierć, ćwi(e)rtnia or ćwiartka.

=== Verbs ===
Proto-Slavic thematic declension undergoes morphological perintegration in Polish, for example the second person plural of moťi (modern móc) was *mož-e-te, but in Polish the thematic vowel -e- becomes absorbed by the personal ending, thus moż-ecie. This parallels the loss of thematic nominal inflection.

All persons are continued from Proto-Slavic; Polish initially continues the dual number, but it is ultimately lost by the Middle Polish period due to simplification tendencies. Polish continues the indicative mood, imperative mood with changes, and the subjunctive mood with changes.

Polish inherits the active voice, passive voice, and reflexive voice, sometimes considered a mediopassive voice from Proto-Slavic.

==== Present tense forms ====
Polish generally inherits Proto-Slavic endings with sound changes; only a few changes occurred.

1. Proto-Slavic first person singular *-ǫ is -ę in Polish, thus continuing the Proto-Slavic shortened nasal vowel;
2. Proto-Slavic second person singular *-si continues in Polish as -sz;
3. Proto-Slavic third person singular *-tь corresponds with Polish -∅; the relationship of these two endings is uncertain;
4. Proto-Slavic first person plural *-mъ has two Polish reflexes, -m and -my; -m is used sporadically from the oldest times to now in verbs whose first person singular takes -ę: będziem, wnidziem (Sankt Florian Psalter), przydziem (Bible of Queen Sophia), baczym, lecim, boim, kupujem, chwalém, cierpiém (Kochanowski), widzim (Potocki) sprawujem (Kochowski), nie użyjem, nie przestaniem, nie będziem, zniesiem (Staszic), przyjdziem Wisłę... będziem Polakami (Wybicki), bronim, ujrzym, musim, dolatujem, zmartwychwstaniem (Słowacki). Northern Polish dialects also use this ending because it appears in poetry and also because of literary tradition, but the dominating ending in Standard Polish is -my: it arose probably under influence of the personal pronoun my;
5. Proto-Slavic second person plural *-te has an exact reflex in Polish -cie;
6. Proto-Slavic third person plural *-ętь sees a generalized -ą in Polish; the relationship between these two endings, especially with regard to the loss of yers and the preceding -t, in uncertain.

Another Polish innovation is the spread of -m type verbs with the endings -m, -sz, -∅; -my, -cie, -ą from Proto-Slavic *-jo||-je verbs, however in the oldest texts archaic forms continuing the Proto-Slavic state can be found: podnaszaję, pożegnaję, przyznawaję się, śćwirdzaję, wylewaję, powiadaję, zgibaję (14th and 15th century). The potential forms, *powiadajesz, *powiadaje, *powiadajemy, *powiadajecie, like those in znaję, poznaję, uznajesz, wyznaje, doznajemy, rozeznajecie, zaznają, underwent contraction whereby -aje- gives á, but contraction was blocked in the first person singular and third person plural probably by the nasal vowel, giving the forms, powiadaję, powiadász, powiadá, powiadámy, powiadácie, powiadają which are vestigually attested still in historic Polish, but already in the earliest epoch another first person singular form is also attested: powiadam, polecam, wysłuszam, pożegnam, umieram, zawołąm, where -aję is replaced by -am; this occurs via leveling based on the verb dám, dász, dá, dámy, dácie, dadzą, where the forms dász = powiadász, dá = powiadá, dámy = powiadámy, dácie = powiadácie, and so powiadaję is reshaped to powiadám based on dám, continued today, and only the third person plural keeps its original form: powiadają, polecają, umierają, etc. This is generally absent from Kashubian and Slovincian. Forms like umieć, rozumieć underwent a similar change; at one point they were umieję, umiejesz, umieje, umiejemy, umiejecie, umieją, etc.. like a large group of verbs like sinieję, czernieję, bieleję, and similar, then the group -eje (< *-ěje) contracted to long é, later slanted. Then in the first person singular old -eję was replaced with -em based on wiem, wiesz, etc. and only the third person singular kept original -eją, but here analogical -ą can occur: umią, rozumią, śmią; the first two are normatively incorrect and śmią is considered allowed alongside śmieją.

Proto-Slavic also possessed athematic verbs, which take the personal ending directly to the stem: these include the verbs *věmь, (from the stem *věd-), *ěmь (from the stem *ěd-), *damь (from the stem *dad-), and *jesmь (from the stem *jes-). Personal forms of these verbs in the present tense take the unique endings *-mь (< PIE *-mi), *-si (< PIE *-sai), *-tь (< PIE *-te), *-ętь (< PIE *-nti or *-enti), and only *jesmь has the third person plural *sątь. Their Polish reflexes are wiem, jem, dam, jeśm and only jeśm generally kept the original conjugation, and the remaining three verbs kept their inherited first person singular forms, but the remaining persons assimilated to thematic verb conjugation. The conjugation of the auxiliary verb jeśm has an archaic nature in the Old Polish era; its forms are generally reflexes of the Proto-Slavic forms:

1. First person singular jeśm from Proto-Slavic *jesmь;
2. Second person singular jeś from Proto-Slavic *jesi with a reduction of the final vowel;
3. Third person singular has three forms: the rare jeść exactly continuing Proto-Slavic *jestь; the most common form jest is uncertain in origin, similar to the rare je, which also is used in the negation construction nie < nie je (nie ma); it seems that all three forms were used alternatingly in Proto-Slavic;
4. First person plural jesmy continues Proto-Slavic *jesmъ with a secondary but prehistoric but common personal ending -my;
5. Second person plural jeście exactly continues Proto-Slavic *jeste
6. Third person plural są with regard to Proto-Slavic *sątь, as with all third person plural present tense forms, is unclear.

From these forms the forms jest and są are in continual use; the forms jeść and je are used rarely in the 14th and 15th century, but the rest of the conjugation was common to the beginning of the 16th century. In the 16th century new forms spread, which arise around the middle of the 15th century and are used to this day: jestem, jesteś, jesteśmy||jestesmy||jestechmy, jesteście, see also § New declension of jestem.

Verbs of the -ę, -isz declension have in innovation in alternating consonants š||ś (< s), ż||ź (< z), c||ć (< t), dz||dź (< d) before the personal ending: koszę||kosisz, grożę||grozisz, rzucę||rzucisz, radzę||radzisz, etc. - in the third person plural, the expected form would be *kosią, grozią, rzucią, radzią, etc., as the consonant was in front of front *ę (< *-ętь), which developed according to Polish phonetic rules into -ą, but before this the front consonant should have softened -s, -z, -t, -d to -ś, -ź, -ć, -dź; however the only forms to exist are koszą, grożą, rzucą, radzą, which would match the reflexes of original sj, zj, tj, dj, despite these clusters not occurring here; these forms are the result not of phonetic changes, but leveling to the first person singular based on forms for these persons of conjugation paradigms o||e, no||ne, e.g. niosę:niesiesz:niosą, piekę:pieczesz:pieką, wiodę:wiedziesz:wiodą, plotę:pleciesz:plotą, wiozę:wieziesz:wiozą, and stanę:staniesz:staną.

Polish changes the conjugational paradigm of some verbs as the result of leveling in individual cases, the assimilation of one form of the original variety to another or of the whole variety to another pattern on the basis of some common structural feature. For examples grzebać had original grzebę (< *grěbǫ) and grzebą (< *grěbǫtь), which give way to innovated grzebię, grzebią based on grzebiesz, grzebie, grzebiemy, grzebiecie, resulting in a change of class and a change of the old infinitive grześć to grzebać.

Dialects also show a different distribution of -m versus -ę; south-western dialects often have -ę: kiwię, chowię, trzymię, pamięcę, wárcę, padzę next to literary kiwam, chowam, etc., and sometimes the opposite, e.g. kopám, sypám, krzykám next to literary kopię, sypię, krzyczę. Some present tense forms where entirely lost, rostę, rościesz, roście (róść), kradę (kraść) became ros(t)nę, roś(t)niesz, kradnę, kradniesz.

A small number of traces of the dual can be seen:

1. First person -wa, which in light of Proto-Slavic *-vě is an innovation, perhaps under influence of the nominative dual of masculine and neuter nouns and non-compound masculine and neuter adjective forms, and the numerals dwa, oba;
2. Second person -ta < *-ta;
3. Third person -ta from the second person, with no traces of *-cie < *-te.

Sporadically forms can be seen among writers of the 16th century - these forms still see use in dialects, but rarely have a dual meaning. In some dialects a compromise between -m(y) and -wa occurred, resulting in -ma; it sees use mostly in the imperative, niesiemy, chodzimy but nieśma, chodźma and arose after the establishment of -my in the general language - the latter must have already had an established position when the ending -wa and its successor in western Poland, the ending -ma, began to be used in the plural. The ending -ta only has a plural function and has a larger territorial range than -wa, however, -ta never managed to replace original -cie in honorifics such as: co robicie (tatusiu), chodźcie (mamusiu); these honorifics, sometimes called “dwojenie”. The Lasovia dialect sometimes preserves dual meaning with these forms.

==== Past tense personal forms ====
Proto-Slavic had four sets of personal forms for an action taking place in the past, the imperfect, aorist, the compound past tense, and the past perfect; this underwent significant simplification already by the Old Polish era.

For actions lasting or repeating in the past the imperfect was used and in prehistoric times these forms saw contraction of aa to a and ěa to e. For single, complete past actions the aorist was used - in Polish only one set of aorist forms are present from the endings - -ch alternating with sz is the reflex of original s, a characteristic morpheme for this type of aorist and is called the sigmatic aorist named after the Greek letter σῖγμᾰ. The following changes occurred in Polish:

1. The third person plural ending -šę was replaced with -chą;
2. Verbs whose infinitive ended in -ti added directly to the root ending in a consonant extended it with the vowel -e and only to this base added the above-mentioned endings. Dual forms were not kept in Polish.

In the oldest medieval texts there are 26 examples of imperfect and aorist forms, suggesting they are exceptional archaisms (8 in Holy Cross Sermons, 13 in Sankt Florian Psalter, 2 in Psalter of Puławy, 2 in court notes from 1401, and 1 in Bible of Queen Sophia); in other texts aorist forms can be found but only of the verb być.

Both of these originally different forms often merged into one: in the third person plural which spread the ending -chą; in the first person singular and second person plural among verbs whose infinitive themes don't end in -i, if, however, the infinitive theme was -a, then after contraction in imperfect forms aa becomes a which does not differ from imperfect forms: działach < *dělachъ and działach < *dělaachъ, działachom < *dělachomъ and działachom < *dělaachomъ, etc. - if the theme ended in -e, then after contraction of *ěa > e there again was no difference between the aorist and imperfect: widziech < *viděchъ and widziech < *viděachъ etc. Similarly verbs with a consonantal stem blurred: imperfect ukradziech < *ukraděachъ merged with the innovated aorist ukradziech < *ukradě-chъ; and the second and third singular of the imperfect were very distinct thanks to their characteristic ending -sze: siedziesze, mołwiasze; the second person plural is unattested; the third person singular aorist ending -∅ often equals the third person singular present form, e.g.: działa, niesie, wiedzie, chwali and as a result it becomes difficult to state with certainty if a given form is a trace of the aorist or a present tense form functioning as the past as the praesens historicum. The aspect of the verb does not provide information on this, as the imperfect was made from imperfective verbs and the aorist from both perfective and imperfective.

The verb być preserved entirely the aorist conjugations, namely bych, by, by, bychom, byście, bychą, but the aorist function of these forms is exceptional (e.g. bych nie skruszon Psalter of Puławy; by uczynion człowiek żywa dusza, jeżto by spytano Bible of Queen Sophia; dan by gloss from the middle of the 15th century), but instead these forms were used as particles expressing the optative mood, see § Subjunctive mood forms.

An important cause of the disappearance of the imperfect and aorist was the development of mutually complementing systems of a verb of the same meaning, but of differing aspect, namely imperfective or perfective; the difference, originally expressed with the imperfect for actions lasting some time in the past and with the aorist for one-time, finished actions, now was expressed by one compound past tense form, meaning the imperfect was replaced by the compound past of imperfective verbs and the aorist was replaced by the compound past of perfective verbs.

In place of the disappearing aorist and imperfect forms, compound past tense forms come into use, formed from personal forms of the auxiliary verb jeśm, jeś, jest, jesmy, jeście, są and the second active past participle; this analytic structure originally had a perfective meaning, but with time this semantic shade weakened, and the compound past came to mean simply any action in the past; in terms of syntax it functions as a copulative with a predicate. The second active past participle was built from the infinitive theme, to which the characteristic suffix -ł- was attached, and -ъ for masculine singular, -a for feminine singular, -o for neuter singular, -i for masculine plural, -y for feminine plural, -a for neuter plural, -a for masculine dual, -ě for feminine and neuter dual occurring in the oldest text of Polish as their etymological reflexes:

1. nióśł, działał, chwalił
2. niosła, działała, chwaliła
3. niosło, działało, chwaliło
4. nieśli, działali, chwalili
5. niosły, działały, chwaliły
6. niosła, działała, chwaliła
7. niosła, działała, chwaliła
8. nieśle, działale, chwalile

Three changes occurred among these inherited forms:

1. The masculine plural form with -i limited its range of use to syntactic phrases with masculine animate nouns by the 17th century, later only masculine personal. However, from the earliest times in syntactic phrases with masculine inanimate, and from the 17th century with masculine animate but non-personal nouns, forms with -y are used;
2. In the neuter plural already in the Middle Ages instead of the rare -a takes -y, also found in the nominative plural of non-compound adjective declension;
3. Dual forms fall out of use in the Middle Ages, but can be seen sporadically in the 16th century.

Ultimately in Polish the forms of this participle are this: -ł- + -∅ for masculine singular, -a for feminine singular, -o for neuter singular, -y for non-personal masculine plural, and the alternate (oboczna) -l- + -i for personal masculine plural: wyszedł jeśm (14th century). Already in the 14th century a tendency to shorten the full forms of the auxiliary verb in the first and second persons of both numbers can be seen, and they disappear entirely in the third person of both numbers - these shortened forms had an enclitic nature. In relation to this the auxiliary enclitic forms lose their semantic distinctiveness and separateness as words and they become endings; the fact they were originally separate words can be seen in their mobility, that is they aren't necessarily connected with the preceding participle, but they can take a different position in the sentence and connect with various words within it. This process of weakening the auxiliary form and reshaping them into mobile endings goes through various phrases:

1. The first person singular shortens to -eśm or -śm and connects with the participle and other words in the phrase: padłeś, gdyśm szedł. The auxiliary word reduces to -em or -m, as in modern Polish: owam przyszedł, przyszedłem;
2. The second person singular shortens to -eś or -ś;
3. The third person singular loses the auxiliary;
4. The first person plural shortens to -smy, and under influence of the first and second person singular and the second person plural, which via etymological sound changes gain -ś-, -smy changes to -śmy; due to imprecise spelling it is difficult to say when this took place; still in the 16th century this softness is sometimes marked in text;
5. The second person plural shortened to -ście;
6. The third person plural loses the auxiliary;
7. The first person dual shortens to -swa;
8. The second person dual shortens to -sta;
9. The third person dual shortens to -sta.

During the 14th and 15th centuries both full and shortened forms co-existed, except the second person plural and the second person dual, and in the third person without the auxiliary and at the end of the 14th century shortened forms of the endings of the auxiliary dominate. The third person forms jest and są are often omitted in Holy Cross Sermons, but still at the beginning of the 16th century these auxiliary forms can be seen in the past tense; at the end of the 15th century and beginning of the 16th century another declension of the compound past of the first person singular, first person plural, and first person dual appears, namely, under influence of the subjunctive forms such as byłbych, robiłbych, widziałbych, bylibychmy, robilibychmy, widziałybychmy, byłabychwa, bylebychwa, innovated endings -ech, -ch, -chmy, -chwa appear: pobudziłech, żech nosił, jeślich zyskał, mowiłech, abowiemech nalazł, iżech m iał, tamoch widział, płakałach, tegoch nie była wdzięczna, alech się gniewała, dowiedzielichmy się, jakochmy pirzwiej położyli, uszlichmy, kiedyżechmy widzieli, mychmy dzwonili, zgrzeszylichmy, obadwa widziałachwa, gdychwa powiedziała, dobrzechwa kupiła. These forms are of a dialectal nature and are associated with Lesser Poland and Silesia; writers from these places introduced these forms to the literary language for a period of one century in the 16th century. but in the first half of the 17th century they are used less and less and then later disappear; this is probably associated with the transfer of the capital to Warsaw, which is in Masovia, where -ech, -ch were not used, furthermore even in Krakovian prints they never had absolute dominance. Forms with -(e)ch remain in Silesia and the south-west corner of Lesser Poland; in Lesser Poland this ending is often pronounced as -k: byłek, chodziłek, já jek był, and in Spisz as -f: byłef, chodziłef, see § Proto-Slavic *x and the rise of Polish ch́. Plural forms, e.g. robilichmy, are rarer, especially in Lesser Poland, where forms like robilimy are preferred; furthermore instead of robiłech or jách robił, já robił is used - in dialects and in colloquial speech the forms niózem, nióześ, mógem, mógeś or niósem, nióseś, mókem, mókeś etc. occur and evince that the base of the stem is the third person singular, but with the loss of final -ł with etymological slanting. While non-contracted infinitive forms such as bojać się, chwieać are kept, the participle may also be non-contracted: bojał, chwiejał.

Forms of the pluperfect tense express either an action long passed, or an action which preceded another passed one; in Polish they are formed by combining the ł participle with the compound past tense of the auxiliary verb być: jako nas Pawlik posadził był na sądzie, a Jasiek tedy nie patrzył prawa (14th century); do którejżeś był posłął nas; zatwardził sie był, bosta sie byle zamroczyle oczy jego (15th century). These forms are generally rare in old texts; in Gniezno Sermons there are a multitude of double-compound forms: anieli sąć to oni byli ucznyili; gdyżci sie Kryst jest był na tento świat narodził, Maria swego synka jest porodzić była miała - but they fill the function of a usual past tense. Later these pluperfect are rather not very common and in modern Polish these verb forms are rare.

==== New declension of jestem ====
Polish has the auxiliary forms inherited from Proto-Slavic jeśm, jeś, jesmy, jeście (see § Present tense forms), which fall out of use at the beginning of the 16th century, displaced by innovations which see use to this day: jestem, jesteś, jesteśmy, jesteście; they appear in the middle of the 15th century and are formed based on compound past forms. As in the third person form był consisting of a new stem to which the endings -em, -eś are added (byłem, byłeś), so arise forms based on the third person form jest, to which -em, -eś are added: jestem, jesteś. In the plural the expected stem is są, and indeed from the middle of the 16th century to the end of the 18th century forms such as sąsmy||sąśmy, sąście can sporadically be seen; this also occurs in dialects; compare Silesian-Lesser Poland: mychmy są, my są, są my, less often sąśmy; and in the north: my są or my (żem) są; in the second person plural sąście or sąśta, wy(że)ście są or wy(że)śta są.

But already in the 15th century the forms jestesmy||jesteśmy, jesteście dominate, with the theme jest from the singular forms, then in the 16th century parallel to past tense forms like robilichmy, bylichmy, widziałychmy, byłychmy the forms jestechmy sąchmy are used, and at the turn of the 15th and 16th centuries the new forms jestem, jesteś were rarely used as the second element of compound past forms: nie jestem pożywał, jestem usłyszał, jesteś się urodził.

==== Future tense forms ====
There were two types of future in Proto-Slavic: the first was expressed either with present tense forms of perfective verbs or also by combining the infinitive with present terse forms of the words *iměti, *načęti, *vъčęti, *chotěti; the second was expressed either in the same way as the first, or also by combining forms of the verb będę with the -lъ participle - in Polish from the oldest times future actions that last are expressed with personal forms of the word będę with the -ł participle or the infinitive of imperfective verbs, and for perfective future events the present tense forms of perfective verbs are used.

==== Imperative forms ====
Already in prehistoric Polish a change occurred that old *-o||*-e and *-no||*-ne stems assimilated their plural and dual forms based on forms of the same numbers of *-jo||*-je and *-i stems, introducing -i- instead of e < *ě: przyjdzimy, żnimy, roztargnimy, ogarnimy, przydzicie, pogrzebicie, podźwignicie, padnicie; wynidziwa.

The oldest texts of historic Polish otherwise faithfully continue the Proto-Slavic state, that is containing -i||-y, except that -m is replaced with -my; only imperative forms of the verb dać disappear, instead of expected *dadz (compare Dadzbog), *dadzimy, *dadzicie, the innovations daj, dajmy, dajcie occur probably via analogy to znaj, etc. -k and -g stems (rzekę, mogę) show deviation from the normal phonetic development via morphological leveling; the expected forms rzec, piec, wlec, strzedz, pomódz from older rzecy, piecy, wlecy, strzedzy, pomodzy where i from the diphthong *oi softens k g to c dz occur rarely, and in their place there is rzecz, piecz, wlecz, strzeż, pomóż - these are innovations that are the result of leveling based on niesiesz:nieś, wieziesz:wieź, pleciesz:pleć, wiedziesz:wiedź; as in these cases second person present and imperative forms have a common theme, thus according to rzeczesz strzeżesz etc., rzecz strzeż etc. are formed.

But already in the oldest epoch reshapings can be seen in the imperative system that ultimately entirely separate it from the inherited state, namely the second and third person singular lose final -i (-y after hardened consonants): in Holy Cross Sermons, Sankt Florian Psalter, Psalter of Puławy, and Bible of Queen Sophia forms with and without -i mix: obroci, sędzi, oświeci, oczyści, odpuści, odprowadź, naucz, zbaw, wypraw, nauczy, bydli but also prowadź, zwal, wypęź, uzdrow, obłudź, mowi, obrzuci, zliczy but also wystąp, skaż, proś. The reason for the loss of -i is motivated by both phonology and leveling: forms with the stress on the -i kept -i longer; forms with the stress on the vowel of the theme lost it and with time, especially after fixing the place of stress, leveling occurred and forms without -i spread (see § Proto-Slavic *i); they also likely leveled toward imperative of the old athematic verbs jedz, wiedz. This mixing of forms with and without -i from the 14th and 15th century continues to a lesser extent in the 16th century, and at the end of this century forms without -i become common. An exception are the imperative of verbs whose stems consist of a consonant cluster after the loss of yers: tni, klni, żni, poczni, zepni, zetrzy, wydrzy, umrzy, odewrzy, zaprzy and this similarly occurs in verbs whose present tense theme ends in a consonant cluster: wytargni, dotkni, kradni, zamkni, dosięgni, roztrząśni, odepchni, etc. The cause for this is that the consonant clusters without the support of final -i would be difficult or even impossible to pronounce and would have to undergo phonetic simplification, deforming the shape of the stem which would become unrecognizable. These forms remain through the 17th century, and vestigially still in the 18th century, but already in the 17th century they slowly reshape into their New Polish form, namely taking the word-final consonant -j: tnij, drżyj, ciągnij, etc.; this happened with relation to the predominant norm that the second person imperative ends with a consonant, and certainly based on imperative forms like pij, bij, myj, where j belongs to the stem. Other innovations occurring in the 17th and 18th century include things such as: wyciągniej, zapomniej, wesprzej, spojrzej, arising perhaps based on chciej, miej, wylej, umiej, chwiej, bielej, siwiej, grubiej, garbaciej, etc.; it is likely that all verbs whose present tense theme ends in -j originally took -i in the second person singular: *piji, *biji, *kryji, *wyleji, *działaji, etc. and that they belong to the verbs that lost -i the earliest, but because of the inexactness of medieval spelling, this is uncertain.

The third person singular was equal to the second person form and shared its development: zgłoba jego sstępi, but already in the 16th century this form is rare, and later falls out of use outside of archaic phrases, e.g. przyjdź królestwo twoje, bądź wola twoja, Bóg zapłać, rozstąp się ziemia and in its place in medieval Polish two analytic structures appear: both have the second element as the third person singular present tense - the first was either ać or niechaj. The particle ać comes from a + ci (dative of the pronoun ty) and saw some use until the end of the 15th century: ać będzie żona pana tego syna, ać mi pożegna twa dusza, ać ofiaruje, dziewka ać się nie pokala. The other particle niechaj is the second person singular imperative of the verb niechać “to allow”, compare zaniechać, poniechać; originally niechaj was used with ać: niechaj ać przydzie with the meaning “pozwół a (on) ci przyjdzie”. Further development went in two directions: either niechaj ać shortened to niechać, niecha: niechać wyjdzie lud, niechać się wróci, niechać się spodziewa, niechać się obleje, niecha czyta, niecha opuści (15-16th centuries), or also the particle remained alone as niechaj, from the 16th century shortened also to niech: niechaj stawa, onże niechaj omyje, niechaj weźmie, niechaj się nie nadziewa (15th and 16th centuries); niech ukrotnieje, niech nie ma, niech zawstyda się (16th century) - this is the state that continues to this day.

When in the second person singular forms without -i were established, then according to them plural forms also lost -i: podźmy, radujmy, przywieźmy, padńmy, wiesielmy się, pokłońmy się, uczyńmy się, płaczmy; gędźcie, rośćcie, podnieście, spadńcie, zapłońcie sie, widźcie, słhyszcie, nauczucie (14th and 15th centuries). After the medieval period of mixing, forms without -i become established in the 16th century: nieśmy, nieście, każmy, każcie, chwalmy, chwalcie; only verbs that had a consonant cluster before i keep -i to the 17th century, and in this time they are extended with -j: tknimy, tknicie, trzymy, trzycie etc. become tknijmy, tknijcie, trzyjmy, trzyjcie. The third person plural equaling the second person: popowie twoi obleczeni bądźcie, chwalcie ciebie gospodnie wszytka działa twoja (Sankt Florian Psalter); bądźcie światła w stworzeniu niebieskim (Bible of Queen Sophia) is rare and in the 16th century falls out of use and in its place analytic forms with ać, niechaj, niecha, niech appear, as in the singular: ać wnidą kobyłki, kapłani ać się poświęcą, ać ofiarują, niechać idą (Bible of Queen Sophia); niechać wyłażą, niechaj wstaną a pomogą (15th century).

Few examples of dual forms are attested; they change in the same way as plural forms, so the first and second person without -i: podźwa, pomożwa, rozbijwa, klęczwa, czyńwa, wywiedźta, przysiężta, wroćta, domnimajta.

==== Subjunctive mood forms ====
These are compound forms, one element is the past form (see § Past tense personal forms), that is the ł participle, and the other is a subjunctive mood particle with personal endings, in Proto-Slavic these forms are *bimь, bi*, *bo, *bimъ, *biste, *bą, and are entirely lost in Polish and from the oldest times in this function the aorist forms bych, by, by, bychom, byście, bychą occur (see § Past tense personal forms). In the second person singular sometimes ty was added to avoid ambiguity: idzie tobie ubogi, iżby ty w ubostwie nie styskował, idzie tobie krol śmierny, iżby ty nie bujał (Holy Cross Sermons), also 1st person dual abychowa umarłą (15th century) and second person dual bysta mogle (15th century) are noted.

Aorist forms acquired a subjunctive meaning because aorist forms became more similar to the original conditional forms, particularly similar to each other were the second and third persons singular: aorist by, conditional bi; second person plural: aorist byste, conditional biste (from older *bite, which assimilated to byste); this motivated other conditional forms to be replaced by aorist forms: *bimь by *bychъ, *bimъ by *bychomъ, *bą by *byšę. The third person singular and second person plural remain without change.

Other forms reshaped according to the past tense conjugation: byłem, byłeś, byliśmy, byłaswa; from this the characteristic endings -m, -ś, -smy||-śmy, -∅, -swa displace the aorist endings. The first person singular bych remains as long as to the end of the 17th century, and in the 16th century sees exclusive use; at the beginning of the 16th century bym appears and spreads; bych remains in Silesian dialects and in the Lesser Poland foothills (here in the form byk or in Spisz byf, see § Proto-Slavic *x and the rise of Polish ch́) as well as in Warmia and Ostróda: Silesian kiebych (gdybym) to wiedziáł, Lesser Poland kiebyk wiedziáł, to byk posed. The second person singular form by sees use until the end of the 16th century, and with the beginning of this century the innovation byś appears; the first person plural form bychom sees use until the 16th century, and next to it the form bychmy, leveled according to bylismy from the 15th to the 16th century: abychmy przypuścili, bychmy nie pomarli, abychmy dali, przeszlibychmy, as well as bysmy in the 16th and 17th centuries: bysmy opłakali, jakobysmy byli, abysmy chodzili, and from the middle of the 16th century to now byśmy. The consonant -ch is vestigially kept in dialects, less often even than the above-mentioned bych; the third person plural bychą is kept only in the Middle Ages, next to it already in Holy Cross Sermons by occurs, which in the 15th century gains dominance, and from the 16th century is in exclusive use. The first person dual changes from bychwa to byswa: bychwa była oba, abyswa spała.

==== The active present participle ====
The active present participle in Proto-Slavoc had two declensions, compound and non-compound; historic Polish kept three forms of the non-compound declension, the nominative masculine singular, the nominative feminine singular, and the masculine accusative singular.

The masculine nominative in prehistoric Polish had already undergone leveling in all conjugation types by spreading -ę to *-o||*-e and *-no||*-ne stems, which was originally from *-jo||*-je and *-i stems; the presence of a hard consonant before this secondary -ę is explained most probably by analogical leveling. As in *-jo||*-je and *-i verbs, the nominative of the participle is the same as the first person singular present tense and this accordance is applied despite etymological sound changes, which would produce forms such as *wiedzię, *pieczę: przydę, niosę, rzekę, utnę, poklęknę, widzę, dzierzę, czynię, mowię, posilę, proszę, przepowiadaję, stwarzaję, kłąmaję, podpiraję, układaję, szukaję, napominaję, każę, buduję, zwiastuję, dadzę - these forms are already infrequent in the oldest texts, and in some, such as Gniezno Sermons or Master Polikarp's Dialog with Death, are entirely absent; the latest example of it is from 1544 - the cause for the disappearance was the indistinctiveness from the first person singular present tense. These forms functioned as attributes of the masculine noun in the nominative case: Mojżesz wszedł na gorę, synaj, jako był jeszcze przykazał pan, niosę (niosący) z sobą cki (Bible of Queen Sophia), however, since the description contained in this type of verbal attribute, i.e. an action or state attribute, not only characterizes the subject noun but also the course of its action or state expressed by the predicate, the participle, as a common description of both the subject and the predicate, takes on the syntactic function of an adverb and is thus moved to the category of adverbs. In view of this, through the separation of the participle form from the noun and an increasingly close syntactic connection with the verb of the predicate, the original case declension form becomes an indeclinable formation with the character of an adverb, and the attributive function is later assumed exclusively by the participle in compound declination forms, which bring it closer to adjectives both formally and in terms of their syntactic functions.

The form rzeka (“rzekąc”), attested five times in Holy Cross Sermons is uncertain, certainly dates to the Proto-Slavic era.

The nominative feminine is continued in Polish in the characteristic form -ęcy; this feminine ending can rarely be seen in the 17th century (łkający, ślący), certainly influenced by forms of the declinable participle, then the old feminine form -ęcy falls out of use in the first half of the 16th century and the only trace of it in the common language is the adverbial use of niechcący; this archaism occurs more frequently in dialects, especially Lesser Polish dialects, in the Carpathians it often occurs in the form -ęcy; beyond the mountains -ący -ęcy forms occur in Opole Silesia only exceptionally; somewhat more frequently than in Silesia but less often than in Lesser Polish these forms can be seen in Masovia; they were entirely common in Slovincian and North Kashubian; Greater Poland and Pomerania got rid of -ęcy and -ący forms entirely. In generally indecinable participles in dialects are disappearing. The syntactic use of this form is the same as the masculine nominative, i.e. ultimately it functions as a defining adverb of the predicate and has an adverbial character.

The masculine accusative appears in Polish as -ąc and corresponds to two Proto-Slavic endings, *-ǫtjь and *-ętjь, which is explained by the fact that Polish took it with the long nasal vowel, which etymologically becomes -ą; already in the oldest texts it is seen replacing the dying endings -ę and -ęcy.

The participle of the auxiliary jeśm was sąc, from the 16th century already only the form będąc is used. Forms built with -ąc with an adverbial function in the nominative neuter plural appear, in addition, the -ąc participle is used as an attributive of a noun in dependent cases; this use of the participle form, typical of Old Polish, persisted for the longest time, to the 17th century, in the accusative participle defining a verb. These forms still appear in Northern Kashubian, Kociewie, Bory Tucholskie, and Krajna. These participles are even more frequent when in reference to the subject. Other dialects use forms like po stojącku, po leżącku, or analytically: jak leżał, jak siedział, etc. more, or with the declinable participle ending -ący (-ąca, -ące). -ę and -ąc forms can also appear as predicates. Next to the above traces of declension of the non-compound active participle, Oolish has from the oldest times to now the compound declension inherited from Proto-Slavic; it is formed from the -ąc participle plus the adjectival declension ending (niosącego, niosącej, niosącym, etc.) - Polish case forms faithfully continue Proto-Slavic forms with the exception of the masculine nominative singular, which takes -y to the stem formed with -ąc, as In Proto-Slavic it was formed like *nesy-jь, *světę-jь). Syntactically, these forms function as attributes, and less frequently as predicates, compare modern e.g. jestem cierpiący, jestem palący. Active participles can sometimes be seen with a future meaning, especially with perfective verbs, whose present tense forms have a future meaning.

==== Active past participles ====
The -ł||-l participle (< *-l-), (see § Past tense personal forms) in Polish is used in the compound past tense as well as adjectives; they are usually from verbs denoting a perfective state: posiwiały, sczerwieniały, zwiędły, znikczemniały, umarły, oschły, były; but also some perfective and imperfective actions: dbały, wyrozumiały.

Another past active participle is kept in Polish vestigually; historic Polish inherited only two forms from the entire Proto-Slavic declension: the nominative masculine and feminine singular - the masculine nimominative singular takes -w to the infinitive theme; within verbs with vocalic infinitive themse this is the etymological continuation: *dvignąvъ, vężavъ, *dělavъ, světivъ, e.g. obrowciw położyw (14th-15th centuries); -i conjugation verbs with the infinitive stem -e (< *-ě) have the etymological forms uźrzew, usłyszew, but under influence of forms like wiedział, słyszał, etc., where e underwent change to a, an also appears before w: uźrzew to sędzia, to usłyszew sędzia (The Life of Saint Blaise), but a źrzaw to sędzia, to usłyszaw Jozef (Bible of Queen Sophia). Verbs with a consonantal infinitive theme also take -w based on these verbs: wszedw, spade, pojadw, zniosw, rzekw, rozpostarw, wstaw; this is a deviation from the Proto-Slavic state, where the participle ended in *-ъ, and after the loss of yers one would expect in Polish the pure infinitive stem, and these forms indeed occur: oblek, przyszed, łąk sie, rzek (15th and beginning of the 16th centuries); but these could be the third person past singular with a lost -ł, and through the function of the attribute in the nominative noun, through establishing a closer defining relationship with the verb of the predicate, these forms acquire the meaning of an adverb and express an action prior to the time of the action of the predicate, i.e. they have the same syntactic use and meaning as the present-day participle upreni in -wszy or -łszy. Only exceptionally does this participle function as an attributive of a noun in the accusative case: widziech anjeła... z nieba śleciew (Holy Cross Sermons); the above -w forms disappear at the beginning of the 16th century and in their place -szy or -wszy forms appear.

The feminine nominative singular inherits the Proto-Slavic forms, that is vocalic infinitive themes take -wszy (< *-vъši) and consonantal infinitive themes take -szy (< *-ъši) or based on vocalic themes -wszy, but these forms appear in the oldest age also near masculine and neuter nouns in the plural and dual: wrocił isę jest Jozef ... pogrzebszy otca (15th century), thus, already in Old Polish, the form of the participle is used in the same way as in present-day Polish: it refers to the subject of the verbal predicate regardless of its gender and number. The -wszy participle remains to this day without change, but the -szy participle remains in use until the end of the 17th century, but already from the oldest times innovations with -wszy appear: przynioswszy, nalazwszy, pogrzebwszy; they disappear only at the beginning of the 17th century. Forms like przynioswszy, nalazwszy sometimes reshape in the 16th and 17th centuries to przyniowszy, nalawszy.

At this time another innovation appears, combining the -ł participle with the -szy participle, giving the ending seen today -łszy; the oldest examples of this come from the middle of the 15th century and spread in the 16th century, and after a transitional withdrawal in the first half of the 17th century again gain strength and with the end of the 17th century they become the only forms, at least in the literary language. Very rarely the innovation -łwszy occurs by combining -ł and -wszy: niósłwszy, wszedłwszy, wyrzekłwszy (15th and 16th centuries).

==== Passive participles ====
In Proto-Slavic there existed a present passive participle with the characteristic suffix -m- added to the present tense theme: *nesomъ, *dvignomъ, vęzěmъ, *světimъ; athematic verbs built these based on thematic verbs: vědomъ or vědimъ; it declined like a noun or compound adjective; within Polish these almost entirely disappeared and the only etymological traces of the pre-Polish state are rzekomy and rodzimy, perhaps also wiadomy and świadomy and a few other words coming from this are innovations based on these words arose later: widomy, niewidomy, ruchomy, łakomy, znikomy, tesknomy, znajomy; these all gained an adjectival meaning and sometimes an active meaning.

The only form to have a passive function in historic Polish becomes the old past passive participle, now neutral in terms of tense, inherited from the Proto-Slavic passive past participle; it takes three characteristic suffixes: -t-, -n-, -en-, they could have either a definite or indefinite declension, see § Adjectives and adjectival pronouns, numerals, and participles.

Non-compound forms only in the nominative singular occur to the 17th century, which enter New Polish as archaisms, e.g. in a prayer context: umęczon, ukrzyżowan, pogrzebion.

The suffix -n- is added to infinitive verb themes that have -a or -e (< *-ě) word-finally; -t- is added to verbs whose infinitive themes are both the stem and end in the vowels -i, -y, -u, -ę, or the consonant -r; other verbs create the passive participle by adding *-en to the infinitive theme, they end either in a consonant (wiedzion < *-ved-enъ), which undergoes etymological softening through -e or also the suffixal vowel -i-, which before -e loses its syllabic nature and as -j- softens the preceding consonant (rodzon < *rodjenъ < *rodi-enъ), in both cases -en- becomes -on- because of Lechitic umlaut of e to o before the hard consonant -n p, only in the nominative masculine personal plural -e is kept because of the n before i softened to ń. The verbs wiodę, bodę, kradę, kładę, plotę, gniotę have dz, c in this case before -eni instead of the expected dź, ć; this is the result of dissimilating desoftening of palatal dź ć before palatal ń.

The passive participle underwent the following developmental peculiarities:

1. Old *-no||*-ne verbs very rarely take the ending directly to the stem with omitting the suffix -n: zamczony (from zamknę), obyczony (obyknę), but more often zamkniony, podźwigniony, wytargnion, popchnion, poścignion, uciśnion, potknion. Probably under influence of verbs like zapięty, zaczęty, wycięty, they take the ending -ęty at the beginning of the 17th century: zamknięty, wytknięty, rznięty, wyciągnięty, odepchnięty. These formations spread over the course of the 19th century, and a few -ony forms give an archaic sound or even leave the conjugation system and become adjectives: spragniony, natchninoy, zlękniony, roztargniony;
2. -’ę, -isz verbs whose stems end in -t, -d, -st, have in older Polish ć, dź, ść (based on wiedziony, pleciony) instead of etymological c, dz, szcz: czciony, uiściony, oślachciony, oczyściony. This innovation withdraws with time and forms such as uiszczony, oszlachcony come to dominate. But to this day secondary ź ś are kept in some participles like uwięziony, rozgałęziony, owłosiony, zalesiony;
3. The masculine personal nominative plural sees a spread in the general language of forms like odziani, wypowiedziani, przejrzeni, cierpiani instead of etymological and older umlautless forms like odzieni, wypowiedzieni, przejrzeni, cierpieni;
4. From the passive partiviple form the so-called past impersonal forms are made: niesiono, czytano, wypito. From a historical point of view, they should be seen as old predicates expressed in the nominative singular of the neuter passive participle with the copulative "jest, było" dropped over time. By what path of development the original singular passive participle acquired an active meaning and became functionally equivalent to the third person plural form does not belong to inflection, but is a question of historical syntax and will be discussed within its framework (see§ The passive participle ending in -ono, -no, -to in the function of an active predicate of subjectless sentences).

==== The infinitive ====
The Proto-Slavic infinitive has the ending *-til; the Polish continuant -ci is already in the oldest texts an exception, even the unclear medieval orthography shows that not in Holy Cross Sermons (with one exception), nor in Sankt Florian Psalter, nor in Gniezno Sermons, nor in Psalter of Puławy, nor in Bible of Queen Sophia there is no infinitive with -ci; it can be seen rarely in some poems, for example in Lament of a dying man, where the rhymes mieci - wyleci (mieczy - wyleczy), umrzeci - na tym świecie (vmrzeczy - na tym szwieczie) undoubtedly confirm its existence - these are certainly archaisms used for versification purposes, thus it is possible to assume that in prehistoric Polish -ci < *-ti took the form -ć.

Similarly, a small number of verbs that had *k g before *-ti, such as *pekti, *mogti, end in -c in Polish, not -cy.

Polish shows the following changes to the infinitive:

1. The verbs grzebę, skubę has the infinitives grześć, skuść leveled after the loss of b according to the verbs in point 1. So *supć > suć (from sypę instead of spę < *sъpǫ). These infinitives fell out of use and the innovations grzebać, skubać, supać replaced them in relation with the change of present tense forms grzebę > grzebię, skubę > skubię, sypię > supię, and their entire conjugation shifts to -’ę, -’esz;
2. The verb wziąć appears from the 16th century and seen today as the proscribed form wziąść;
3. The verb idę has in older polish the etymological form ić < *iti. After the prefix przy < *pri from contraction the two i's in *priiti give the form przyć. If the prefix ended in -a, -o and after the suffix -u, the stem i lost its syllabic nature and gives the forms zajć, najć, dojć, ujć. From the 16th century based on wiodę - wieść, przędę - prząść etc., the new infinitive iść arises; a simplified form occurs after prefixes: uść, zaść, naść next to forms seen today as well ujść, zajść, najść, etc.;
4. The verb jadę has an alternating form jachać and jechać - the original form is jechać, but jachać, in old texts and today Masovian and Greater Polish dialects, is associated causally with the dialectal change of ja- > je- and resulted in a hypercorrection, and because dialectal forms like jabłko, jesny had a folk association, initial je- gained this association as well. The form jechać from the oldest times dominates in Lesser Poland and ultimately spreads;
5. From verbs with -a stems, e.g. stać, znać, dać, the frequentative derivative -wa- is added: stawać, dawać, wyznawać, etc., like today. This -wa- is used to create frequentative verbs from verbs whose infinitive stems are made with the suffix -a-, e.g. skonawać, dopytawać, oszukawać, przysłuchawać, obaczawać, oczekawać, opłakawać, wyśpiewawać. But already in the 15th century formations with the suffix -ywa||-owa (after k g and partially after ch) begin to spread. In the 16th century both -awać and -ywać are used, but -ywać with a growing advantage, which finally spreads with the exception of verbs that don't have a clear frequentative sense such as naigrawać się (but przygrywać);
6. Verbs with present tense -uję build the infinitive with -ować, which can be seen in modern forms like całować, znamionować, godować, kupować, przyjmować, Old Polish zyskować, zostawować. However verbs with a frequentative meaning change in the 16th century and the following centuries from old -owa- to -ywa, e.g.: Old Polish opatrować, usługować, opisować, pokazować, zakazować, zyskować, later opatrywać, usługiwać, etc. Dialects differ from the literary standard starkly. Masovian dialects and neighboring dialects under their influence, so northeastern Greater Polish, have a state similar to the standard, as here imperfective verbs take -ować, -uję, and frequentatives at least in the infinitive have -ywać; Masovian shows a difference here in that frequentative verbs create a present tense -ywuję, meaning they use a compromised form that is the result of mixing forms like rachuję and forms like oczekiwam; this type of present tense is also present in the literary standard (porónywuję, zachowywuję), but these forms are considered incorrect. Southern Lesser Polish, Silesian, and Greater Polish dialects spread the formants -ować, -uję for imperfective forms as well as frequentative verbs, so not only rachować - rachuję, kupować - kupuję, rysować - rysuję, but also pisować - pisuję, rozkazować - rozkazuję, wykopować - wykopuję, przemyślować - przemyśluję, podskakować - podskakuję. The above Old Polish examples have their source in Lesser Polish and Greater Polish dialects;
  1. In Lesser Poland and Masovia forms like maluję - maluwać, kupuję - kupuwać occur. Exceptionally already in the 15th c. the form całuwać is noted;
  2. In northwestern Poland -ać forms were introduced instead of -ować and -ywać: kupać - kupám (kupuję), wykrzymać - wykrzykám, wyjmać - wyjmám, zajmać - zajmám. These same forms are also used by Mickiewicz: z wozu na ziemię wylata; nad murawą czerwone połyskają buty;
7. The verbs kluję, pluję, szczuję, żuję have in medieval Polish the infinitive klwać, plwać, szczwać, żwać, later based on czuję - czuć, truję - truć gain the new forms kluć, pluć, szczuć, żuć.

== Syntax ==
Syntax has not changed much throughout historic Polish one gets the impression that its syntactic system in general agrees with the modern system; certain syntactic structures disappeared, others were innovated. Dialectal syntax doesn't differ much from Standard Polish both in modern times and in Old Polish in its syntactic rules; in certain aspects it is similar to Old Polish. The largest changes that took place were within numeral-noun agreement.

=== The subject ===
The biggest changes occurred within noun phrases in connection with a cardinal numeral or numeric adverb e.g. modern dwa domy, trzech żołnierzy, pięciu synów, sześć miast, kilku przyjaciół, kilka dni, dużo mężów, mało krajów, mało ludzi, parę przyjaciółek, sporo dni., where the gender or type of numeral can cause the subject to appear in either the nominative or genitive. The nominative usually occurs with the numerals 2, 3, 4, i.e. an adjective-attributive structure, a trait inherited from PIE; isolated exceptions with the genitive occur, most likely modeled on numerals from 5 up, .e.g. trzy wielbłądów chodziło (15th century), trzej albo czterzej młodzieńcow, kardynałow czterzej (16th century), dwaj murzów, trzej sędziów, zapalonych gore dwie pochodni związku sobie życzy, dwie srebrnych fontant bucha (19th century), however constructions where each element in the genitive began to spread when the noun was of masculine personal gender, e.g. dwóch mężów, trzech żołnierzy (see below).

With cardinal numbers from 5 up as well as with an adverbial numeral the noun of the subject occurs in genitive regardless if it is masculine personal or non-masculine personal, seen today because the numerals 5–9, 10 and its multiples (20, 30), 100 and its multiples, and 1000 and its multiples had from Proto-Slavic nominal inflection and the meaning of a collective noun, thus the noun of the counted object connected with it in a structure of case government, taking the genitive with a partitive function or divided whole, thus the original understanding of the syntactic relation of this numeral-noun group like pięć krów, sto koszy was different than it is today, namely that it approached the understanding of the modern groups piąka krów, setka papierosów, oddział żołnierzy, where the subject is piątka, setka, oddział, and the noun in the genitive is subordinate to it and performs an attributive function.

However a shift occurred already in the Old Polish era whereby the numeral becomes syntactically subordinate to the noun, previously superordinate, and the noun becomes the syntactic subject but is kept in its oblique (genitive) case form; this process very clearly shows itself in cases where the numeral-noun group occurs in the function of another case than the nominative and another part of the sentence than the subject, e.g. opowiadam pięciu przyjaciółkom, czekam od dziesięciu godzin, byłem w sześciu sklepach, etc., see also § Structures with an adverbial.

Also in combinations with 2-4 the noun of the object takes the genitive form if it is of the masculine personal gender starting in the 17th century when the old constructions like dwa syny, oba pustelnicy are replaced with ich dwu było, idzie poruczników dwóchl; a few exceptions occur, e.g. kapłani siedmdziesiąt boży wsprzeciwili się, księżęta dwieście (15th century), sto mężowie, dwanaście apostołowie, ony pięć mądre panny (16th century), siedm synowie uznali (17th century), są wyrażone pięć wymiary (18th century), tysiąc barwy (19th century).

Finally with a collective number like, e.g. dwoje, czworo, which arose in the 15th century (see § Collective numerals) a count noun with the function of the subject is in the genitive.

Polish inherits personless sentences; dialects use personless sentences more than standard Polish, especially when it comes to phenomena of nature - in the Łowicz dialect a formal subject appears in sentences of this type, however in terms of content it is also the indeterminate pronoun ono: óno padá, óno grzmi, óno má sie na dysc, óno go nie beło widać, óno jej sie widziała krzywda, óno go beło mozná przekónać, óno beło w gaziecie, óno sie zimom nájbarzy choruje; this type of examples can also be found in other dialects, e.g. Lasovian: na świéty Piotr i Paweł idzie w piekle désc; to óno i na ziemi idzie. A subject expressed by a pronoun that is an older, respected person of any gender takes in dialects the form of the nominative plural masculine personal: wy, oni: Byliście w mieście (towards a woman), Oni idą (of one woman).

=== The predicate ===
In historic Polish the verbal predicate agrees with the subject in person, number, and gender. There are certain deviations from this rule:

1. The predicate in the plural with a collective singular noun occurs, e.g. tedy lud wkładli są;
2. Sometimes with the pronoun każdy, e.g. rzucili takież każdy pręty.

Sometimes both constructions are used in the same text, e.g. lud... rozmyślał, jeśliby miał przestać od chwały świętej Anny... or jeśliby ją mieli chwalić (The Life of father Suso, 16th century); the closer to the New Polish era, the more these formations disappear, and now a predicate in the plural is used only with collective nouns denoting a pare composed of a man and woman, e.g. państwo przyszli, wujostwo wyjechali, Tadeuszostwo nas odwiedzą.

The noun księże shows fluctuation in its governed agreement already in the 14th century: książęta seszli są sie (Sankt Florian Psalter), with the masculine form of the predicate with a neuter form of the noun, also in the singular: książę jedno żydowskie przyszło ku Jezusowi, prosił jego (Przemyśl Meditation), książę jedno rycerstwa Daryjuszowego ubaczał Aleksandra (The History of Alexander the Greater); in the 16th century the construction with masculine government based on the semantics of the word comes to dominate. Mesgnien writes “Usu tamen factum est, ut iam plerique sic loquantur: książe przyjachał, potius quam przyjachało” (However, in practice, most people now speak thusly: książe przyjachał, rather than przyjachało), this uncertainty likely continued however through the 18th century, as Kopczyńśki recommends to consider the word książę as a masculine noun.

Numeral-noun constructions with a numeral from 5 up and historically three constructions were in use:

1. The predicate is in the feminine due to the original nature of the numeral: temu minęła ośmnaście lat;
2. The predicate takes a plural form because of the semantics of the numeral and the masculine-personal or non-masculine-personal gender of the predicate is determined by the gender of the count subject noun in the construction: pięć mądrych nabrały ojelu;
3. The predicate takes a neuter form, ultimately the agreement used today: było palm siedmdziesiąt - this government sometimes spread even to combinations of numerals from 2–4 with count subject nouns, e.g. dwa tygodnie minęło, trzy lata minęło, lat trzy minęło and always with a masculine personal noun in the genitive, e.g. było kilku kasztelanów.

Neuter government spread possibly because this is the easiest way it was possible to express the relationship of the predicate to the numeral-noun group without regard to the gender and number of individual members of it, which determined in various ways the shape of the predicate in the first two constructions; the fact that this group as a whole, and not its numeral constituent, is determined by the neuter gender of the predicate is proven by the syntax of the numeral tysiąc, which, despite clearly being felt as a masculine creation with a full nominal declension, takes sometimes also a neuter predicate, e.g. Turkow tysiąc przybywało, Giaurow padło tysiąc (17th century) and in more recent times this construction spreads even to the subject expressed by the noun szereg with the genitive of a count noun, e.g. szereg ludzi słyszało, szereg generałów porobiło (20th century). Another motivation is for these constructions were possibly personless sentences like owiec wiele zginęło, in which there originally was no subject, the determiner of the predicate “zginęło” was the compliment expressed by the partitive genitive owiec, and the determiner of the complement owiec was the accusative of the numeral wiele in the function of an adverbial of measure, with time however there occurred a change in the understanding of the syntactic relations: the indeterminate numeral wiele took the position of the superordinate member, its determiner function was taken by the genitive owiec, and the predicate in the neuter was placed into a direct relation of subordination with regard to wiele, which was understood as the nominative singular neuter of the adjective wiel(i), further serving as a model for numeral-noun constructions.

The form of the predicate with the subject expressed by a concentration of a collective numeral with a noun fluctuated in the past, e.g. śpiewa chłopiąt małych troje (17th century), dziewcząt dwoje odpoczywało (19th c.entury), but troje słońca zabłysnęły, te oboje wojska ruszyły (17th century), when a structure of concord dominates in the numeral-noun construction it continues over also to the predicate, but when numeral-noun construction is in a position that governs case marking, the predicate is expressed with a form adapted to the entirety of the numeral-noun construction, and so the singular neuter form, like with other cardinal numerals, but the treatment of combinations of a collective numeral with a noun is the result of historic development of the collective numeral from the three-gender creation in both numbers into the one-gender singular (number) creation.

The predicative with a copulative expressed by a personal form of the auxiliary word być occurs in the nominative or instrumental; the choice of one or the other changes over the course of the history of Polish and in various ways depending on which part of speech the predicative is and in what gender it occurs.

An adjectival predicative of the masculine gender occurs primarily in the nominative; to the middle of the 16th century the nominative dominates nearly exclusively, but from the middle of the 16th century a certain fluctuation begins that lasts to now, with the nominative dominating. It seems that the more frequent use of the instrumental doesn't depend on the era, but is rather the result of a personal tendency of a writer, e.g. Orzechowski, Birkowski, Korzeniowski, Brodziński; the biggest intensification of the instrumental lands at the end of the 18th century and the first half of the 19th century; later times prove rather a return to the definite dominance of the nominative (but in some scripts of Orzeszkowa the instrumental was still frequent); also in the 20th century the instrumental is seem despite orthoepic indications, which advise against such expression of the adjectival predicative.

A similar tendency dominates primarily in other genders of the adjectival predicative - the feminine before the 17th century sees the nominative in nearly exclusive use; a stronger growth of the instrumental in the 19th century; in the neuter the predicative instrumental before the 19th century was almost unknown, and in the 19th century only sporadically; the nominative also decidedly dominates in masculine personal and non-masculine personal plural. Some writers like Birkowski, Brozdiński, Krasiński show a strong tendency for the instrumental in all three genders despite the dominating norm.

The development of the nominal predicative is therefore divided into three periods:

1. From the oldest times in all genders and both numbers there is mixing of the nominative and instrumental: Tobiasz jest ociec tego mlodzieńca but będę jemu oćcem;
2. A dominatinve of the nominative over the instrumental in all cases and both numbers lasts until the end of the 15th century, and in the neuter singular even until the end of the 16th century;
3. A dominance of the instrumental over the nominative in the masculine and feminine singular, and at least a state of balance of these two cases in the masculine plural begins in the 16th century, for the neuter singular in the 18th century and lasts until the end of the 18th century;
4. Almost exclusive use of the instrumental in all cases of both numbers lands in the 19th and 20th centuries.

In a nominal-adjectival predicative until the end of the 15th century, and in the feminine until the end of the 16th century, the nominative dominates: bog moj jeś ty (Sankt Florian Psalter); the period of mixing the nominative and the instrumental lands in the 16th, 17th, and 18th centuries, for the feminine only in the 17th and 18th. From the beginning of the 19th century in the masculine singular the instrumental gains dominance, everywhere else exclusiveness, and ultimately wins Moguntczyka, który był nadwornym kapelanem (Adam Mickiewicz).

The history of the predicative can be split up into three epochs:

1. The first epoch, the 14th and 15th centuries and certainly earlier, of the nominative dominates, when the nominative predicative sporadically appears in the instrumental next to the dominating nominative, whereas the nominal-adjectival predicative is expressed almost without exception in the nominative;
2. The second epoch, the 16th, 17th, and 18th centuries, of the fluctuation of, the mixing of the nominative and instrumental to varying degrees in varying types,. Among the nominal and adjectival-nominal predicative the dominance of the instrumental grows, in the adjectival predicative the instrumental rarely occurs;
3. The third epoch, the 19th and 20th centuries, in the nominal and adjectival-nominal predicative the instrumental dominates. The nominative has the vast dominance in the adjectival predicative, which constitutes the baseof the norm.

Dialects show changed in gender agreement in various ways (see articles on various dialects for details); namely:

1. Personal forms in south-west Lesser Poland, in Silesia, and in a large part of Greater Poland (exclcuding the north east). Only here one can find the differentiation of. Next to this traces of the old animate gender can rarely be seen, e.g. ptaki zjedli, ci wilcy zjedli. Sometimes forms that normally refer to objects are used for people, e.g. te chłopy poszły;
2. Marking of the masculine personal gender is allowable, as can be seen, only in the predicate, whereas in the object along with the attributive the form characteristic of feminine personal nouns in the literary language exclusively dominates. The type described here exists in northern Sieradz, in Kujawy, Pałuki, Krajna, in Chełmno-Dobrzyń land, and in western Masovia: te stare chłopy siekli, rodzone bracia byli - te kobiety (dzieci) widziały;
3. A lack of differentiating genders in central Polish, e.g. i wzieny ty syny, pojechały na pole. The construction shown here serves sometimes as a means of stylized dialectalising speech;
4. A mix between types 1 and 3, e.g. mieszczany stojeli, krowy sie paśli, drzewa byli wysokie, takie byli wstążki mocne, where the subject group and the predicative went in the direction of non-personal forms, the copula however uniformized the personal ending. This is a property of Bory Tucholskie, Kociewie, Malbork, Lubawa, Far Masovia, Podlachia, the Ukrainian borderlands, thus generally of the north-east periphery, and partially lands that weren't originally Polish, but polonized in modern times.

When speaking to older people or those deserving respect for other reasons the masculine personal form is required, regardless if one is referring to a man or woman, e.g. tatuś pośli, matusia pośli.

=== Structures with a modifier ===
Quantitative attributives of measure expressed by a cardinal numeral, e.g. dwie godziny, od trzech godzin, przed pięciu godzinami are of note; in modern Polish two constructions dominate:

1. A numeral in a construction of concord noun performing the function of a determiner of amount with regard to it, e.g. dwaj ludzie, dwoma ludźmi, trzech chłopców, dziesięciu przyjaciołom, trzy stoły, na czterech polach;
2. A numeral in a construction of concord with a noun of a count object and it determines it; the noun is in the genitive, e.g. pięć kobiet, dziesięć koni, sto drzew, pięćset domów; the noun, despite being semantically superordinate, appears in a subordinate genitive form as it is determined by the numeral; whereas the numeral, despite being semantically subordinate, has a form independent from the noun determined by it and it determines the nominative or accusative function of the entire numeral-noun phrase.

The numerals 1-4 already from the oldest times are in a structure of concord with a noun the function of an attributive relative to it; this also happens with masculine personal nouns for example in the most ancient construction like trze krolowie, and later trzej królowie, and the latest trzech króli. Sporadic deviations from this norm are based on introducing case marking into the relation of the numeral to the noun, which is expressed in the genitive form of the noun, e.g. we dwu lat - this is particularly frequent in dialects on the eastern borderland - within the cardinal numerals 1-4 the old syntactic relation of concord is kept until now generally without change.

Numerals from 5 up originally connected with a noun with case marking, that is the noun occurred constantly in the genitive form with a partitive function, and the numeral could take various case forms depending on the syntactic relation, which occurred between the whole numeral-noun phrase and some other part of the given sentence, e.g.:

1. Nominative: sześć grzywien, sie napełni dwadzieścia lat, książąt tysiąc (15th century), siedm śmiertelnych grzechow, kasztelanow ośmnaście, kantorow trzysta (16th century), trzysta pancernych, sto nimf (17th century);
2. Accusative: przez sześć świadkow, za dziewięć grzywien, za czterdzieści dni, był żyw ośmset lat (15th century), przez trzydzieści lat (16th century), twierdz trzydzieści (17th century);
3. Dative: ku cztyrzem stom mężow (15th century), przeciw sześcidziesiąt dział (17th century);
4. Instrumental: siedmią ran, siedmiąnaście kmiot, ze cztermi sty mężow (15th century), pod czterdzieścią chorągwi, z trzema sty rajtarów (16th century), z pięcią s et janczarow (17th century), trzema sty grzywien (18th century);
5. Locative: w ośmi lat, w sześcinaćcie lat (15th century), w piąci set koni (16th century), w dziewięci lat, we stu koni (17th century).

Grammarians of the first quarter of the 19th century, e.g. Jakubowicz, claim that numerals above 5 in the nominative and accusative function govern a noun in the genitive: “przybierając zaś odmianę w innych przypadkach pospolicie zgadzają się w tychże z imionami; rzadziej zaś kładś się z przypadkiem ich drugim” (and taking a declination in other cases, they commonly agree in these with the names; more rarely, however, they agree with their second case); this suggests that at the beginning of the 19th century a change occurred matching the syntactic rules of modern Polish, in which in a numeral-noun phrase with a numeral from 5 up in the function of the nominative and accusative within non-masculine personal nouns case marking dominates, e.g. pięć koni, dziesięć stołów, dwadzieścia kobiet, sto nauczycielek, pięćdziesiąt książek, dwieście drzew, and in the function of other cases of non-masculine personal and masculine-personal, as well as in nominative and accusative of masculine personal a structure of concord occurs, e.g. pięcioma końmi, na dwudziestu stołach, dziesięciu kobietom, stu nauczycielek, w pięćdziesięciu książkach, pod dwustu drzewami, pięciu żołnierzy, sześćdziesięciu uczniów.

Given that numerals 5 and above were feminine nouns in Proto-Slavic, they took declension with the noun appearing in the genitive regardless of the case of the nouns; this was inherited in Polish, formal emphasis of the syntactic function of the whole numeral-noun phrase can occur also in the noun member even in early texts:

1. Dative: siedmi mężom (15th century), dziesięći dziewicam (16th century);
2. Instrumental: sześcią groszmi, dziesiąćią grzywnami (15th century), ze trzemi dziesty osobami, ze dwiema sty i ośmdziesiąt i cztermi biskupy (16th century_, z sześcią innemi biskupami, z piętnastą w siami, ziedmią fosami (18th century);
3. Locative: W piąci kopach, w siedmi leciech, we dwudziestu dnioch, w dziewiącidziesiąt leciech (16th century), na tysiącu statkach (18th century).

This construction developed on the base of a slow increase of syntactic superordinance of the noun component over the numeral component seen a long-lasting fluctuating use of one of two constructions, such as: z tąż ośmią skot, w tej ośminaście niedziel, where the attributive shows a dominance of the numeral member, and: za tych pięć dni, onym siedmi mężom, where the attributive shows a dominance of the noun member, and from this a third construction compromising these two arises in the 16th century, as it takes into consideration on one hand case and on the other number, e.g. przez całe sześć miesięcy (neither całą sześć nor całych miesięcy). A further stage of development appears in the fact that numerals from 5 up lost their original inflectional forms characteristic of nouns and began to take forms characteristic of the numeral dwa (see § 5-10, and in these conditions the ending -u can spread in all cases, despite being syntactically, as the very existence of the numeral and inflectional ending of the noun provided enough clarity. This development began in Middle Ages, strengthened in the Middle Polish era, and gained normative exclusiveness in the New Polish era.

The archaic case marking syntax was kept in the numeral-noun phrase with a nominative and accusative function, e.g. pięć domów, sto kobiet, at least in the case because a numeral-noun phrase in these functions occurred relatively more often than in the function of an adverbial or a complement, which is expressed in different cases other than the accusative. This frequency of use could have been accompanied by an establishing of the type: pięć domów, sto kobiet, etc., as well as its bigger resistance to formal change discussed above; there were also fewer motivations of this change in this construction because the construction occurs in the syntactically independent function of the subject: where the construction was a subordinate part of the sentence, and especially when it included a preposition with a locative or temporal meaning, as is the case, for example, in the locative case, there were better conditions and stronger motives for emphasizing the syntactic function of the entire numeral-noun phrase also in the appropriately changed case of the noun, e.g. w pięci domu > w pięci domu > w Pięć domu.

The durability of constructions of the numeral with the noun in the genitive performing the function of the accusative of the complement could be based on the awareness of the formal identity of the nominative and accusative plural of nouns: since the noun itself has in the nominative and accusative the same form (stoją : domy, rosną : drzewa, idą : kobiety as well as widzę : domy, drzewa, kobiety), then the numeral-noun phrase in these two cases could keep the same shape (stoi : pięć domów - widzę pięć domów, rośnie : pięć drzew - widzę : pięć drzew, idzie : pięć kobiet - widzę : pięć kobietc etc.). In addition to this, this state had to have been supported by the same structures in the nominative and accusative like wiele domów, dużo drzew, mało kobiet, as well as combinations like oddział żołnierzy, wiadro wody, garść zboża, where the noun of the count object occurs constantly in the genitive with a partitive function.

As to the syntax of collective numerals, then as long as they had full declension in all three genders they connected with a noun in the function of its quantitative attributive in a structure of concord: oboj ten żywot, dwoje miejsce, obojemu państwu, troim mieczem, na dwojem morzu, miedzy oboją stroną, dwoi posłowie, oczu oboich, ku oboim dziatkom, dwoimi drzwi mosiądzowymi (16th-17th centuries), w czwór sposób, z pięciora chleba, w pięciorej winie, na pięcorych księgach, o siedmiorym błogosławieństwie (15th-16th centuries). From the end of the 16th century this syntax falls out of use, especially with numerals ending in -or; it is kept the longest with the numeral obój, until the 19th century: w potrzebie obojej, po obojej stronie, na oboim brzegu, obojego tułacz bytu, z oboich barków, and in place of this the one-gender singular neuter collective nouns enter use, known to modern Polish, see also § Collective numerals.

As to the case form of the noun, both possibilities occur: case marking, that is it occurs in the genitive, as well as a structure of concord, that is in the case which is required by the syntactic role of the entire construction of the nouns of the collective numeral with the noun; this fluctuation is characteristic of Polish until the 17th century, and continues somewhat in the 18th century, e.g. case marking: z trojga rodu, obojga rodzaja, obojga stadła (15th century), sześcioro grabstwo (16th century), troje słońca zabłysnęły, z dziesięciorgiem dziećmi (17th century), obojga prawa doktorem, obojga świata, w obojgu zdarzeniu, w obojgu szkołach (18th century) or concord: dziesięcioro biskupstw, pięciorgiem chleba, z pięciorga kamieni, w obojgu testamentów, o dwojgu drzwi (16th century), twoje polskich królestw, czworo biskupstwa rzymskiego (17th century). Ultimately in the New Polish era the same rules for cardinal numerals from five up is established: in concentrations with a nominative or accusative function the noun occurs in the genitive form according to the requirements of case marking, in a concentration with the function of other cases, except the instrumental, the noun occurs in the same case as the collective numeral, in other words concord; a construction in an instrumental function breaks away from this, e.g. dwojgiem dzieci, where the noun takes a genitive form, but in the 18th century the noun appears according to case marking, that is in the instrumental, e.g. trojgiem dzieci, and the only other exception frm this above rule in New Polish is the combination of the numeral oboje with a noun naming a person, e.g. oboje rodzice, oboje Kozłowscy, which is a concentration of concordance in all cases, including the nominative and accusative. A numeral of a noun in a construction with a collective numeral predominately governs the singular in the oldest times, e.g. obojga narodu, but already at the end of the 15th century cases of the use of the plural spread, and this construction, e.g. obojga narodów, wins out from the end of the 18th century.

Old Polish shows attributive constructions of a noun with second noun in the dative attributing it, e.g. Bogu rodzica, utoka ubogiemu, pomocnik sirocie, na część i na fałę godom niniejszym, na wiek(i) wiekom (14th century), ty będziesz nieprzyjaciel stopam jej, dziewce mąż, jenże był ociec przebywającym (15th century); this attributing noun connects within itself the function of an attributive with the function of a complement of the object of interes, which gives as a result a particular shade of a possessive attributive.

Constructions like: wykupił list Piotraszew Czepurskiego (1401), stolec Dawidow, przodka jego (1543), krola Aleksandrowym statutem (Orzechowski) have the noun, e.g. list is attributed by two attributives equiordinate to it, both with a function denoting belonging, but one of them is a possessive adjectival, the second a genitival possessor; traces of this Old Polish state are kept until now in the set prayer abyśmy byli godni (abyśmy się stali godnymi) obietnic Pana Chrystusowych.

An example from Zapiski sądowe Warszawskie from the beginning of the 16th century: Jakom ja nie zbił Macieja syna Mikołajewa Żegadła z Dąbrowki show that a similar construction is possible in a combination of an adjectival attributive (Mikołajewa) with an adverbial pronominal attributive (okolicznościową przyimkową).

Sometimes next to a possessive adjectival attributive there is a whole subordinate sentence, whose function is attributing the subject named in the noun that is the base of the possessive adjective, e.g. położcie kamień w święci kościelnej, jen udziałał Salomon, where jen refers to the concept kościół contained in the adjective kościelny.

Nominal attributes separating with the specific function of a personal name in constructions like Jan Jurkowic, Andrzeja Biernatowica, z Lenartem Tomkowic, etc. are, as can be seen, in a construction of concord; there are some exceptions from this norm which consist of the surname keeping its indeclinable form, e.g. na imienie Jana Dzirżkowic, szlachetnego Jana Jurkowic, Mikołaja Rycerzewic, kmieciewi robotnemu Jakubowi Pietrzykowic, przezyskał na Mikołąj Święszkowic (from Zapiski warszawskie, 15th-16th centuries) - these are mostly likely cases of the vestigal genitive plural of the noun being a familial surname: as in dialects Franek Dyjerów, Janek Skrzyńskich, Mańka Stupków is said, as in the Middle Ages someone could me named Nam Dzierżkowic in the meaning Jan dzierżkowiców.

=== Structures with a complement ===
Polish inherits casal complements (marked in some case), prepositional complements (constructed with a preposition and then a governed case), and infinitival complements (where the verb is in the infinitive); the exact distribution of these types sometimes matches or sometimes changes, whereby a word that previously took e.g. a casal complement can take a different case, the preposition of a prepositional complement can change, a casal complement becomes a prepositional complement, etc.

The infinitival complement continues uninterrupted in some verbs, however if the infinitive complement had its own dependent noun complement, it was originally expressed by the genitive, not the accusative: jął się owiec i też koz bić, bieżeli gasić ognia, błedow oświecać mają, nas nauczył pokus zwyciężać, aby tego przebaczyć r aczył, umyślił jej dogonić, tych przykładów chować przystoi (16th century), komukolwiek sie zabaży wierszów pisać (17th century).

Chief among changes of casal complements is the replacement of the accusative with the genitive depending on if the complement is a masculine animate or inanimate noun; already in the oldest era the use of accusative among of masculine animate nouns is exceptional, e.g. stracił Janusz swój koń, żałował na MIkołaja, Sułek przepraszał Grot, pwaj w Bog (15th century), later these cases are sporadic, having an archaic character, e.g. mając lampart na sobie; wsiadaj na swój dzielny koń (16th century), miał koń leniwszy (17th century), and today in some fossilized phrases: iść za mąż, za pan brat. However the genitive from the oldest times is common. The cause of this replacement of the accusative with the genitive was a tendency to a formal differentiation of the subject and complement, which as a result of free word order and the shape of the nominative and accusative of consonantal masculine nouns could in certain contexts be unrecognizable, e.g. in sentences like syn prowadzi ojciec (see also declension of masculine nouns in the accusative singular), also the significantly wider use of the genitive in a partitive function, which is indicated by cases like poświęciliśmy domu bożego, dostali innego herbu, naśladował obyczaju, where the masculine inanimate noun also occurs in the genitive as the complement of a transitive verb were an influencing factor. The use of genitive as accusative in the plural in complements of a masculine personal noun is much later; the first signs of this occur already in the 14th century, but spreads commonly only in the 17th century, see also declension of masculine nouns in the accusative plural.

Except masculine animate nouns in the singular and masculine personal nouns in the plural the complement is in the accusative with the exception of some newer expressions like tańczyć mazura, grać wista, kłaść pasjansa, wydać talara, palić papierosa, spłatać figla, zabić ćwieka; The causes for these cases are various, and this most often happens because the corresponding noun, whose form is understood as the genitive for accusative, is an archaic genitive, e.g. tańczyć mazura, or is also the result of mimicking constructions with a partitive genitive, like dać chleba, also dać rubla, palić papierosa.

Among declarative complements, occurring after verbs like czynić kogoś jakimś or czymś, nazywać kogoś jakimś or czymś, a doublt accusative construction is in use all the way up to the middle of the 16th century: błogosławiona uczyni ji na ziemi, jenże mie zbawiona uczynił, zbawiona mi uczyń prze miłosierdzie twoje, zbawiona uczyń krola, zbawion uczyń lud twoj, grzech moj znan ci jeśm uczynił (14th century).

Historically the complement of the accompanying noun is sometimes expressed not only with a preposition with the instrumental but also introducing this construction is the conjunction i: ktorzy gdy wspołek trzy dni i z oną panną Emerencyją byli na nabożnej Modlitwie (16th century); this construction is certainly the result of contamination of two constructions, e.g. za list i wiadomości dziękuję and za list z wiadomościami dziękuję, resulting in za list i z wiadomościami dziękuję.

The passive voice also sees changes in its complement: in the oldest era olf Polish it is expressed with the instrumental with relation to the animate object: bogiem sławiena, a są ta ista słowa zmowiona oćcem świetym, a to wszystko tobą jest stworzono; but also in this function there are prepositional constructions namely od: od tajemnic twych napełnion jest żywot (15th century), Jewa miała być od złego ducha zdradzona, od żydów jest pośmiewan, od chrześcijanow nie ma być chwalona, był pytan od jednego ubogiego (16th century), and in a later development the instrumental is limited to a few cases when the agent of the state is an inanimate object: byłem zmieszany widokiem, jestem zdziwiony twoim zachowaniem się, jestem przygnębiony tą wiadomością, lud ruszył pędzony instynktową mocą; these are cases when the verb names not only a passive state of felt effects of the object of the complement, but also names the spiritual demeanour caused by this object, but developing later independently in the psychic experience. Later the agent comes to be expressed with a prepositional phrase and most often with the preposition przez with the accusative, seen in modern Polish now.

The complement of ]a compared object is expressed in older Polish also with casal constructions, namely in the genitive: wszech najwyższy dał jest głos swój (14th century), ten był oćca barzo lepszy (15th century), jeden drugiego lepiej, gwiazdy jaśniejsze wybranego złota, pani wszech piękniejsza (16th century), ciemniejszaś ty księżyca (17th century), wyższy ciebie (18th century) or the dative with the word podobny or similar: przypodoban będę stąpającym w otchłań (14th century), ktoraż się przyrowna lilijej, mieczyk jest ziele podobne mieczom, czeski język barzo podobny mowie naszej, jest rzecz prawdzie podobna (16th century); podobni sobie, twarzą był mu podobny, podobny podobnego sobie smakuje (17th century), podobniuchna w tym kształcie krasnej jarzębinie (18th century); however also in this function prepositional phrases occur, and the choice of the preposition is often different than in newer Polish:

1. ku + dative: trzy czaszki ku orzechu podobne; wspomożenie podobne k niemu (15th century); syny ku macierzy podobne, co są w szystkie skarby świata tego k temu, co ewanielia obiecuje (16th century);
2. przeciw + dative: przeciw im niewiasty daleko mierniejsze się w tym widzą (16th century);
3. miedzy + instrumental: miedzy greckiemi krolewnami śliczniejszą, Krystus był miedzy syny ludzkimi nacudniejszy (16th century);
4. mimo + accusative: zdrowa bądź, dzieciwice, mimo wszytki cześniejsza (15th century);
5. nad + accusative: żądniejsza nad złoto i nad kamień drogi barzo, słodczejsza nad miod i nad strzedź (14th century), uczyniłeś mię dziwnego nade wszytki, Noe był mąż wyższy nade wszytko swe pokolenie, Maria, jażeś nad słońće i nad miesiąc cudniejsza (15th century), różdżka znamienitsza nad inne, krolewicze, nad inne wszytki naszlachetniejszy panicze (16th century);
6. nad + instrumental: naświętsza nade wszemi niewiastami (15th century), naśliczniejszej był cudności nad syny ludzkimi (16th century);
7. przed + instrumental: panny przed wami nic lepszego nie (15th century).

Over the course the development of Polish a number of complements for certain verbs have disappeared due to the given meaning of the verb disappearing or being replaced by another word, e.g. kłamać kogo = udawać kogo (to pretend to be someone).

=== Structures with an adverbial ===
Not many changes occurred in adverbials.

The adverbial of place when denoting which is the end of the action of the superordinate verb could sometimes be in the genitive, e.g. krolewstwa niebieskiego domieści nas bog (14th century), from which the action of the superordinate verbs originates expressed with the genitive, e.g. Sędziwoj mej włoki ujął (= S Sędziwoj z mej włóki ujechał, i.e. jej część oderwał), puszczej Synaj wyszedwszy (15th century), iżeś mię tych god oddaliła (16th century); in which the action of the superordinate verb unfolds expressed with the adjective z and the accusative, e.g. te się rzeczy działy z onę stronę Jordana, wojska rzymskie stanęłu, z jednę stronę Oktawkiego, z drugę Brutusa (16th century) and this archaic construction lasts as late as the 18th century; and an adverbial denoting the aim of an action was often denoted with ku + dative, which was later replaced with do + genitive, albeit somewhat unevenly in dialects. The adverbial of time may often expressed by: the genitive of a noun, e.g. błogosławi gospodzin dnia na każdy dzień (14th century); in later Polish the nominal genitive of the adverbial of time is possible only in combination with an attributive, e.g. tamtego tygodnia, owej nocy, dziesiątego grudnia; or expressed by: the accusative, ktorykolidzień jego wykusicie (15th century); the locative, e.g. zimie, lecie, wieśnie, which is kept as an archaic until the 18th century, and stillin some dialects.

The adverbial of manner is often expressed in the instrumental, e.g. zapłakachą wszem sircem (14th century) or prepositional phrase, uczyńmy człowieka ku obliczu a ku podobieństwu naszemu (15th century).

The adverbial of aim is often expressed with the prepositional phrase ku + dative, e.g. gospodnie ku pomożeniu mnie weźrzy, oni zaprawdę rozidą się ku najedzeniu (14th century); later Polish replaces this construction with a prepositional phrase using na, do, dla, celem beginning as early as the second quarter of the 16th century ku, e.g. in Żywot Pana Jezu Krysta by Opec published by Haller there is: posłał im anioły ku pocieszeniu, but in Wietor's version: na pocieszenie or in the same Poncjanie: iżebyście mi dali syna swego ku nauce next to na naukę. Dialectal pójść do lasu na jagody, na huby; pójdę we świat za poszukaniem jennego sposobu.

The adverbial of cause is expressed by the instrumental: Falko zagaszenim świece był przyczyńca rany (15th century). Later, this construction fell out of use, and its modern trace is the instrumental form szczęciem, meaning “luckily.”

It may also be expressed by the genitive: nic to było siedem lat walczyć, nie przestając, mróz i gorąco cierpieć, głodu przymierając (16th century). This construction survives vestigially in a soldier's song from the turn of the 18th and 19th centuries: idzie żołnierz borem, lasem, przymierając głodu czasem.

Another form is the prepositional phrase prze with the accusative: prze przezwiństwo przyjął jeś (15th century). The word prze can still be heard in dialects along the Slovak border, but Polish dialects generally form the adverbial of cause with the preposition przez: Przez co óni tak płacą? Sometimes bez is also used, e.g. bez co? meaning “dlaczego?”, reflecting the fact that bez and przez are used interchangeably in some dialects.

The words za and z also occur quite often in this role: za ludzkie ozory dziewczyna obrzydłą. More rarely, in the Middle Ages, przed occurs with the instrumental: ktoryć człowiek nieczyste odzienie ma, ten ci z pokojem przed robaki w niem nie odpoczywa (14th century).

More often than in later periods, the preposition dla is used with the genitive: oćcowie niewinni dla złości a przeigrania synow imienia włosnego pozbywają, a to nie dla winy oćcowskiej (15th century). In the oldest examples, dla is also placed after the genitive, a construction now very common in dialects: togo dla przed wołem (14th century). Combinations with other prepositions are more common in dialects, including skróć, skróś, scrawny, gwoli (guli), and skierz.

The adverial of measure is expressed with the preposition z with accusative and denotes most often an approximate measure, “approximately” and as can be seen today in constructions like zostanę tam z dziesięć dni, ma z pięćdziesiąt lat, daj mi ze trzy książki; sometimes in the meaning “as much as” as is shown by some element of context, e.g. fraszem mam z potrzebę doma “as much as needed”; in dialects this construction is more frequent.

=== Syntactic use of the indeclinable participle form ===
Participles ending in -ąc (-ę) and -szy have in the Old Polish era most often an adverbial function, but there are cases where the indeclinable participle performs the function of various cases of the declension of the declinable preposition; in the 14th century this is rare, occurs more often in the 15th century, and over the course of the 16th century they leave use:

1. Nominative: przyjemca jeś moj i powyszając głowę moje (14th century);
2. Genitive: ktoryż to był ociec śpiewając (15th century);
3. Dative: pokazał się pięćdziesiąt braciej pospołu siedziąc (15th century);
4. Accusative: święte anioły śpiewając słyszeli (14th century);
5. Instrumental: ale ja ustawionym krolem od niego na Sion gorze świętej jego, przepowiadając przykazanie jego (16th century);
6. Locative: Rachel pogrzebiona na ścieżce idąc do Efratan (15th century).

In dialects participle constructions are on the whole very rare with the exception of Pomeranian dialects; furthermore the indeclinable participle formed with -ęcy or -ący may occur instead of -ąc: tak mu to wej sło, jako inemu nie przykładajęcy jedzenénie; jesce z téj pościele do powały dopluchnem lezęcy; na gnátkak siedzęcy; ona sła śpiwajęcy; however these adverials are replaced in dialects quite often by prepositional phrases, e.g. na siedząco, na leząco, na siedząckę, na lezącke, chylączką, po siedzącku, na klęcącku, na stojącku.

Participles ending in -szy in dialects are almost not used at all and with a full sentence beginning generally with the adverb jak.

=== The passive participle ending in -ono, -no, -to in the function of an active predicate of subjectless sentences ===
Forms like chwalono, zbudowano, ukryto are etymologically the nominative neuter singular of the passive past participle (see also the § Passive participles), but they now perform the function of a past tense active voice predicate in subjectless sentences, e.g. chwalono bohaterską postawę żołnierzy, zbudowano nowy dom, broń ukryto w lesie, meaning there was a change a passive meaning of the participle becoming an active meaning; there are many proposed theories as to how. Per Oesterreicher, forms like chwalono, zbudowano, ukryto developed from older chwalono, zbudowano, ukryto - jest; therefore they were forms of the passive voiced composed of the auxiliary word jest in the function of a copulative and the participle in the function of a predicate and it referred to the past and had the original meaning as modern chwalone, zbudowane, ukryte było, zostało; this can be seen in that the copulative jest is sometimes kept, e.g. owa postawiano jest wszytko przed ołtarzem bożym; nie obleczesz się rucho, jeżto z wełny a ze lnu tkano jest, but most often is ellided, e.g. a popędzono sierce ludzkie ku działaniu (= popędzone zostało serce ludzkie ku działaniu); also in the masculine gender, e.g. i pobit Judas od izraela (został pobity); a uźrzawszy Syrski, iże pobit od Izraela, posłał posły (iż został pobity). The process of omitting the copulative in these formations can be understood the same as it is understood in third person singular compound past tense forms, in which ultimately the copulative jest, as a rule, stopped being used, and the old -ł participle took on a personal function: chodził jest, widział jest, niosła jest, leżało jest changed to chodził, wiedział, niosła, leżało etc., see also the § Past tense personal forms. Forms of the passive participle with the copulative were used not only in relation to a subject of the neuter gender, as in the example nie obleczesz się w rucho, jeżto z wełny a ze lnu tkano jest; it also appears often in subjectless sentences: jako jest przeproszono (15th century); and it also happens often with the use of the copulative było: a Adamowi było naleziono pomocnika podobnego jemu (15th century). The pressence of the accusative complement with the passive voice form can be explained with parallel constructions, for example tę książkę czyta się przyjemnie, where the sentence is active in meaning, reflexive in form, and appears in a subjectless sentence, and similarly the appearance of accusative książkę changes the meaning of the form czyta się from passive in a construction like ta książka czyta się przyjemnie to active in construction, and in the same way the presence of the accusative with forms -ono, -no, -to causes it to be understood as active and transitive despite the original character of the passive forms.

Forms ending in -ono, -no, -to take on an active meaning only around the middle of the 17th century, which was accompanied by the complete disappearance of the § Proto-Slavic indefinite forms, that is a nominal declension (see also the § Passive participles) and these forms, especially after the omission of the copulative, stopped being understood in their passive meaning, and fell out of the conjugational system as participles, and the accusative of the complement accompanying them and semantically dependent on them gave them the function of an active, transitive, and personal form, referring to an indeterminate person but approximate to the third person.

These participles are not used in dialects.

=== The accusative with the infinitive ===
In Old and Middle Polish texts the construction of accusative with the infinitive occurs after verbs denoting perception as well as thinking, like widzieć, ujrzeć, słyszeć, sądzić, mniemać, wierzyć, dowiedzieć się: ktorzy widzieli są lice Mojżeszowe wychodzącego być rogate (15th century); after verbs denoting speaking, claiming, indicating like mówić, opowiadać, wspominać, sławić, pisać, opisać etc.: jeśli kto człowieka nie osiadłego być winnego zapowie (15th century); after verbs denoting want, will, a request, permission: tedy chcemy jego być karanego (15th century); after verbs denoting an action like czynić, zrządzić: i błądzić je uczynił (14th century); after verbs denoting a spiritual state: cirpiąc sąsiada płot uczynić przez dwie lecie; after expressions like przydało się, jest rzecz jawna, potrzeba jest: gdyby ktorego ślachcica przygodziło się być zranionego (15th century).

This construction was relatively rare in the Old Polish; it does not occur in Holy Cross Sermons, it is not in oaths (roty przysiąg) announced by Lekszycki, Piekosiński, Pawiński, Ulanowski, Potkański, Maciejowski, and Balcer. A small number of examples in Sankt Florian Psalter show that they were direct translations of the Latin, e.g. i pomdleć jeś kazał jako pająk duszę moję = et tabescere fecisti sicut araneam animum eius; particularly illustrative in this regard is the translators retention of Bible of Queen Sophia, namely the accusative with the infinitive occurs in it only twice, and everywhere else this construction is replaced by another, e.g. dumque vidisset Deus terram esse corruptam = a gdyż uźrzał bog iżto ziemia się skaziła; si vidisset adversum se bella consurgere = byłliby widział wstawające boje przeciw sobie; si videris asinum fratris aut bovem cecidisse in via = uźrzyszli wołu albo osła brata twego padwszy; faciam te crescere vehementissime = i każę tobie wielmi bujno rość; quam ob causam dixit esse sororem tuam = prze ktorą rzecz mieniłeś ją sobie siostrą. Further supporting the claim that this is the result of calquing from Latin is the fact that the most examples of it in Polish are found in the second half of the 16th century among the writers: Górnicki, Marcin Bielski, Orzechowski, Stryjkowski, Bazylik; writers of the 17th century also eagerly use this construction: Starowolski, Joachim Bielski, Radziwiłl, writers from the times of the rebellion of Zebrzydowski: Szymonowicz, Potocki, Kochowski, Sobieski, Opalański, Pasek use it significantly less often. It occurs less and less among writers of the 18th century; it is used exceptionally by Leszczyńśki, Konarski, Drużbacki. Thus the peak of intensity of the accusative with the infinitive lands in the period of the strongest Latin influences, and the construction disappears along with the weakening of these influences. Finally, many notable and famous writers avoid it, attesting to its foreignness; Kochanowski, Sarga, Rej, in the 17th century Zimorowic, Żółkiewski all avoiding this construction. It is unlikely that this construction did not enter spoken or colloquial speech when it was used, by the New Polish epoch this construction is dead, and is seen exceptionally in Krasicki's, Trembecki's, Karpiński's, Kniaźnin's, Czartoryski's, Feliński's, and later Chodźka's and Korzeniowski's works.

This construction is not foreign to Pomeranian, Greater Polish, Silesian, and Lesser Polish dialects neighboring Silesian; this is perhaps from German influence, or in the case of Podhale, from Slovak influence. This is a new phenomenon in dialects, and its spread is assisted by the disappearance of participle constructions, which sometimes performed a similar function, e.g. widział go stojąc - widział go stać, as in dialects where these participles live there is no accusative with the infinitive.

== See also ==
- Old Polish
- Middle Polish
- Dialects of Polish
- History of Polish orthography
- Slavistic Phonetic Alphabet
- Polish people
- Culture of Poland

== Bibliography ==
- Klemensiewicz, Zenon; Lehr-Spławiński, Tadeusz; Urbańczyk, Stanisław (1965). Gramatyka historyczna języka polskiego (in Polish) (III ed.). Warsaw: Wydawnictwo Naukowe PWN.
- Długosz–Kurczabowa, Krystyna; Dubisz, Stanisław (2006). Gramatyka historyczna języka polskiego (in Polish) (III ed.). Warsaw: Publishers of the University of Warsaw. ISBN 978-83-235-2602-5.
- Klemensiewicz, Zenon (2002). Historia języka polskiego (in Polish). Warsaw: Wydawnictwo Naukowe PWN. ISBN 83-01-12760-0.
- Walczak, Bogdan (1995). Zarys dziejów języka polskiego (in Polish). Poznań: Kantor wydawniczy SAWW. ISBN 83-85954-51-1.
- Rospond, Stanisław (2012). Gramatyka historyczna języka polskiego z ćwiczeniami (in Polish) (4 ed.). Warsaw: Wydawnictwo Naukowe PWN. ISBN 978-83-01-13992-6.
- Olander, Thomas (2015). Proto-Slavic Inflectional Morphology. Leiden: Brill. ISBN 978-90-04-27049-7.
- Kapović, Mate (2006). "The Development of Proto-Slavic Quantity (from Proto-Slavic to Modern Slavic Languages)". Wiener Slavistisches Jahrbuch. 51. Austrian Academy of Sciences Press. doi:10.1553/wsj51s73.
