= Przemysław =

Polish masculine given name

- Pronunciation: Polish: [pʂɛˈmɘ.swaf]
- Gender: masculine
- Language: Polish

Origin
- Derivation: przemyślny (clever) sława (glory, fame)
- Meaning: clever, intelligent
- Region of origin: Poland

Other names
- Nicknames: Przemek, Przemuś
- Cognate: Přemysl
- Related names: Przemysł

Przemysław (Polish: [pʂɛˈmɘ.swaf]) is a Polish masculine given name. It is derived from the Polish name Przemysł, cognate to Czech Přemysl, and the common Slavic element sława meaning "glory, fame".. It means "someone who is clever or ingenious" or "famous for being clever".

Diminutive forms include Przemek and Przemuś (hypocorism). The feminine form of the name is Przemysława.

== Name days ==
Individuals named Przemysław may choose their name day from the following dates: April 13, September 4, October 10, or October 30.

== Notable people with the name ==
=== Royalty and nobility ===
- Przemysław I Noszak (1334–1410), Duke of Cieszyn-Bytom-Siewierz
- Przemysław II, Duke of Cieszyn (1422/25–1477), Duke of Cieszyn
- Przemysław of Oświęcim (c. 1362–1406), Duke of Oświęcim
- Przemysław of Racibórz (1258/68–1306), Duke of Racibórz
- Przemysław of Toszek (1425–1484), Duke of Oświęcim and Toszek

=== A-J ===
- Przemysław Andrejuk (born 1977), Polish politician
- Przemysław Babiarz (born 1963), Polish sportscaster and game show host (Jeopardy!)
- Przemysław Banaszak (born 1997), Polish footballer
- Przemysław Bargiel (born 2000), Polish footballer
- Przemysław Bereszyński (born 1969), Polish footballer
- Przemysław Błaszczyk (born 1977), Polish politician
- Przemysław Bobak (born 1974), Polish diplomat
- Przemysław Boldt (born 1974), Polish footballer
- Przemysław Borkowski (born 1973), Polish author, columnist, and comedian
- Przemysław Branny (1970–2026), Polish singer and actor
- Przemysław Cecherz (born 1973), Polish football manager
- Przemysław Cichoń (born 1978), Polish footballer
- Przemysław Czajkowski (born 1988), Polish discus thrower
- Przemysław Czarnecki (born 1983), Polish politician
- Przemysław Czarnek (born 1977), Polish politician and academic
- Przemysław Czerwiński (footballer) (born 1995), Polish footballer
- Przemysław Czerwiński (born 1983), Polish pole vaulter
- Przemysław Czyż (born 1972), Polish diplomat
- Przemysław Domański (born 1986), Polish ice skater
- Przemysław Ereński (born 1934), Polish chess player
- Przemysław Frankowski (born 1995), Polish footballer
- Przemysław Frasunek (born 1983), Polish computer hacker
- Przemysław Gawrych, Polish sprint canoer
- Przemysław Gdański (born 1967), Polish economist and chess player
- Przemysław Gintrowski (1951–2012), Polish composer and musician
- Przemysław Gosiewski (1964–2010), Polish politician
- Przemyslaw Jeziorski (1982–2025), Polish‑American academic

=== K-P ===
- Przemysław Kamiński (born 1996), Polish footballer
- Przemysław Karnowski (born 1993), Polish basketball player
- Przemysław Kasperkiewicz (born 1994), Polish racing cyclist
- Przemysław Kazimierczak (born 1988), Polish footballer
- Przemysław Kaźmierczak (born 1982), Polish footballer
- Przemysław Kita (born 1993), Polish footballer
- Przemysław Kocot (born 1986), Polish footballer
- Przemysław Koperski (born 1974), Polish politician and lawyer
- Przemysław Krajewski (born 1987), Polish handball player
- Przemysław Krompiec (born 1985), Polish model
- Przemysław Krych (born 1966), Polish entrepreneur and investor
- Przemysław Kulig (born 1980), Polish footballer
- Przemysław Lechowski (born 1977), Polish classical pianist
- Przemysław Lewandowski (born 1975), Polish rower
- Przemysław Łudziński (born 1983), Polish footballer
- Przemysław Macierzyński (born 1999), Polish footballer
- Przemysław Małecki (born 1983), Polish football manager
- Przemysław Matyjaszek (born 1978), Polish judoka
- Przemysław Mazur (born 1978), Polish rally driver
- Przemysław Miarczyński (born 1979), Polish windsurfer
- Przemysław Mystkowski (born 1998), Polish footballer
- Przemysław Niemiec (born 1980), Polish cyclist
- Przemysław Niesiołowski (born 1974), Polish diplomat
- Przemysław Norko (born 1979), Polish footballer
- Przemysław Noworyta, Polish figure skater
- Przemysław Ogrodziński (1918–1980), Polish diplomat and activist
- Przemysław Oziębała (born 1986), Polish footballer
- Przemysław Pawlicki (born 1991), Polish motorcycle speedway rider
- Przemysław Pitry (born 1981), Polish footballer
- Przemysław Płacheta (born 1998), Polish footballer
- Przemysław Porębski (born 1998), Polish footballer
- Przemysław Prusinkiewicz (born 1952), Polish computer scientist

=== R-Z ===
- Przemysław Reut (born 1969), Polish filmmaker
- Przemysław Rogowski (born 1980), Polish sprinter
- Przemysław Sadowski (born 1975), Polish actor
- Przemysław Sajdak (born 2000), Polish footballer
- Przemysław Saleta (born 1968), Polish boxer
- Przemysław Skwirczyński (born 1952), Polish cinematographer
- Przemysław Słowikowski (born 1993), Polish sprinter
- Przemysław Stańczyk (born 1985), Polish swimmer
- Przemysław Stępień (born 1994), Polish volleyball player
- Przemysław Stolc (born 1994), Polish footballer
- Przemysław Szabat (born 1985), Polish footballer
- Przemysław Szarek (born 1996), Polish footballer
- Przemysław Szkatuła (born 1992), Polish footballer
- Przemysław Szymiński (born 1994), Polish footballer
- Przemysław Truściński (born 1970), Polish comic book artist
- Przemysław Trytko (born 1987), Polish footballer
- Przemysław Turek (born 1960), Polish orientalist
- Przemysław Tytoń (born 1987), Polish footballer
- Przemysław Urbańczyk (born 1951), Polish archaeologist
- Przemysław Urbański (born 1982), Polish footballer
- Przemysław Wacha (born 1981), Polish badminton player
- Przemysław Waściński (born 1995), Polish athlete
- Przemysław Wipler (born 1978), Polish politician
- Przemysław Wiśniewski (born 1998), Polish footballer
- Przemysław Wysocki (born 1989), Polish footballer
- Przemysław Zadura (born 1988), Polish handball player
- Przemysław Zamojski (born 1986), Polish basketball player

== See also ==
- Przemysław (disambiguation)
- Przemyśl (disambiguation)
- Polish name
- Slavic names
