= Old Polish =

Early form of the Polish language, spoken between the 10th and 16th centuries

- iꟁzik polsky (Note: Following Sankt Florian Psalter orthography.)
- Pronunciation: [ˈjãzɨk ˈpɔlʲskɨ]
- Region: Central Europe
- Era: developed into Middle Polish by the 16th century
- Language family: Indo-European: Balto-Slavic; Slavic; West Slavic; Lechitic; Old Polish
- Writing system: Latin

Language codes
- ISO 639-3: None (mis)
- Glottolog: oldp1256

The Old Polish language (Polish: język staropolski, staropolszczyzna) was a period in the history of the Polish language between the 10th and the 16th centuries. It was followed by Middle Polish.

The sources for the study of the Old Polish language are the data of the comparative-historical grammar of Slavic languages, the material of Polish dialects, several Latin manuscripts with Polish glosses, as well as – most importantly – monuments written in Old Polish: the Holy Cross Sermons (Polish: Kazania świętokrzyskie), the Sankt Florian Psalter (Psałterz floriański), Bogurodzica (Bogurodzica), the Bible of Queen Sophia (Biblia królowej Zofii, or Sárospatak Bible, Biblia szaroszpatacka) and some others.

The Old Polish language was spoken mainly on the territory of modern Poland. It was the main vernacular of medieval Polish states under the Piasts and early Jagiellons, although it was not the state language (that being Latin).

== History ==
The Polish language started to change after the baptism of Poland, which caused an influx of Latin words, such as kościół "church" (Latin castellum, "castle"), anioł "angel" (Latin angelus). Many of them were borrowed via Czech, which, too, influenced Polish in that era (hence e.g. wiesioły "happy, blithe" (cf. wiesiołek) morphed into modern Polish wesoły, with the original vowels and the consonants of Czech veselý). Also, in later centuries, with the onset of cities founded on German law (namely, the so-called Magdeburg law), Middle High German urban and legal words filtered into Old Polish.

Around the 14th or the 15th centuries, the aorist and the imperfect became obsolete. In the 15th century the dual fell into disuse except for a few fixed expressions (adages and sayings). In relation to most other European languages, though, the differences between Old and Modern Polish are comparatively slight, and the Polish language is somewhat conservative relative to other Slavic languages. That said, the relatively slight differences between Old and Modern Polish are unremarkable considering that the chronological stages of other European languages that Old Polish is contemporary with are generally not very different from the Modern stages and many of them already labelled "Early Modern". Old Polish includes texts that were written as late as the Renaissance.

=== Earliest written sentence ===
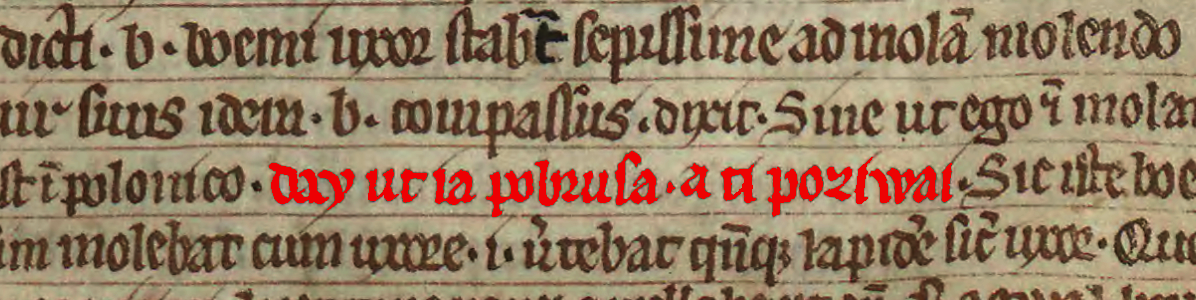
"Day, ut ia pobrusa, a ti poziwai", highlighted in red

The Book of Henryków (Polish: Księga henrykowska, Latin: Liber fundationis claustri Sancte Marie Virginis in Heinrichau), contains the earliest known sentence written in the Polish language: Day, ut ia pobrusa, a ti poziwai (pronounced originally as: Daj, uć ja pobrusza, a ti pocziwaj, modern Polish: Daj, niech ja pomielę, a ty odpoczywaj or Pozwól, że ja będę mielił, a ty odpocznij, English: 'Let me grind, while you take a rest'), written around 1270.

The medieval recorder of the phrase, the Cistercian monk Peter of the Henryków monastery, noted: Hoc est in polonico 'This is in Polish'.

== Spelling ==
One of the variants of the sign used to write nasal vowels in Old Polish

The difficulty that medieval scribes had to face while attempting to codify the language was the inadequacy of the Latin alphabet to some features of Old Polish phonology, such as vowel length and nasalization, or the palatalization of consonants. Thus, Old Polish did not have a unified spelling. Polish glosses in Latin texts use romanized spelling, which often failed to distinguish between distinct phonemes. Already then, however, certain spellings of proper names become unified.

The spelling in the major works of Old Polish, such as the Holy Cross Sermons or the Sankt Florian Psalter is better developed. Their scribes tried to resolve the aforementioned issues in various ways, which led to each manuscript having separate spelling rules. Digraphs were commonly employed to write sounds not present in Latin, the letter ⟨ꟁ⟩ (called "o rogate"; eng. "horned o") with appearance varying between ⟨ꟁ⟩, ⟨ø⟩ and ⟨ɸ⟩ (see image on the right) was introduced to spell the nasal vowels, and the basic Latin letters were now used consistently for the same sounds. Nevertheless, many features were still only rarely marked, for example vowel length.

=== Parkoszowic ===
About 1440, Jakub Parkoszowic, a professor of Jagiellonian University, was the first person to attempt a codification of Polish spelling. He wrote a tract on Polish orthographic rules (in Latin) and a short rhyme Obiecado (in Polish) as an example of their use. The rules that were proposed included the following:

- introduction of new letters of different shape to write hard (unpalatalized) consonants, while soft (palatalized) consonant letters were left unchanged,
- doubling of vowel letters to mark long sounds, for example: ⟨aa⟩ – /aː/ (but only if length decided the meaning of a word),
- use of the letter ⟨ꟁ⟩ to write the short nasal vowel (⟨ꟁꟁ⟩ for the long nasal vowel),
- use of the letter ⟨g⟩ to write /j/, reserving ⟨q⟩ for /ɡ/ instead,
- use of digraphs and trigraphs to distinguish between the various coronal fricatives and affricate.

Parkoszowic's proposal was not adopted, as his conventions were judged to be impractical and cumbersome and bore little resemblance to the spellings commonly used. However, his tract is of great importance to the history of the Polish language, as the first scientific work about the Polish language. It provides especially useful insight to contemporary phonology.

== Phonology ==
Over the centuries, Old Polish pronunciation underwent several changes.

=== Consonants ===
The early Old Polish consonantal system consisted of the following phonemes. Since the precise realization of these sounds is unknown, the transcriptions used here are meant to be approximations.

| | Labial | | Coronal | | Post- alveolar | Palatal | Velar |
| | hard | soft | hard | soft | soft | soft | hard |
|---|---|---|---|---|---|---|---|
| Nasal | m | mʲ | n | | | ɲ | |
| Stop | p b | pʲ bʲ | t d | tʲ dʲ | | | k ɡ |
| Affricate | | | | t͡sʲ d͡zʲ | t͡ʃ (d͡ʒ) | | |
| Fricative | (f) v | (fʲ) vʲ | s z | sʲ zʲ | ʃ ʒ | | x |
| Approximant | | | ɫ | lʲ | | j | |
| Trill | | | r | rʲ | | | |

The sound [d͡ʒ] only occurred in the cluster [ʒd͡ʒ], therefore its phonemic status is doubtful.

The most important consonantal changes concerned the realization of the soft coronal consonants. Of these, /tʲ/, /dʲ/, /sʲ/ and /zʲ/ strengthened their palatalization and became alveolo-palatal, and the former two were affricated. The resultant sounds were similar to their modern Polish counterparts: /t͡ɕ/, /d͡ʑ/, /ɕ/ and /ʑ/. This change happened very early, starting already in the 13th century as evidenced by spelling.

Somewhere around the 13th to 14th century, the phoneme /rʲ/ came to be pronounced with considerable friction, probably resulting in a sound similar to Czech /r̝/ (but by then probably still palatalized: /r̝ʲ/).

The Proto-Slavic language did not have a /f/ phoneme. In the 12th and 13th century in the dialects of Lesser Poland and Masovia the initial clusters /xv/ and /xvʲ/ were simplified to /f/ and /fʲ/ (e.g. chwatać > fatać, chwała > fała, chwila > fila). This enlarged their consonantal inventory by two. This change did not make it to the literary language, and was ultimately reversed also in those dialects. But before that, in the 14th and 15th century these two sounds became firmly established in borrowings (in earlier loanwords foreign [f] was replaced by either /b/ or /p/). Perhaps one of the oldest loanwords which keeps /f, fʲ/ unchanged is the word ofiara ("victim; offering"), loaned from Czech ofěra, since the pre-writing era change ě>a before a hard consonant (przegłos polski) seemed to have operated in it. (Note: This should by no means be taken as evidence that this word was borrowed already in the pre-writing era, but rather that it entered the language early enough for the mentioned change to still be productive) /f/ also appeared later from the reduction of the cluster /pv/ (chiefly in the word upwać > ufać and derivatives).

The very end of the Old Polish period (15th–16th century, so during the transition to Middle Polish) saw the palatalization of the velar plosives /k/ and /ɡ/ before front oral vowels to [kʲ] and [ɡʲ], named the so-called "fourth Slavic palatalization". This distinction was later phonemicized with the introduction of borrowings which had hard velars before front vowels, as well as the denasalization of word final /ɛ̃/. Note that this change did not affect the velar fricative /x/ or velars before the front nasal vowel /æ̃~ɛ̃/. Not all regional varieties handled this change in the way here described, most notably in Masovia.

After these alternations, the late Old Polish consonant system presented itself thus:

| | Labial | | Coronal | | Post- alveolar | Palatal | Velar | |
| | hard | soft | hard | soft | soft | soft | soft | hard |
|---|---|---|---|---|---|---|---|---|
| Nasal | m | mʲ | n | | | ɲ | | |
| Stop | p b | pʲ bʲ | t d | | | | [kʲ] [ɡʲ] | k ɡ |
| Affricate | | | | t͡sʲ d͡zʲ | t͡ʃ d͡ʒ | t͡ɕ d͡ʑ | | |
| Fricative | f v | fʲ vʲ | s z | | ʃ ʒ | ɕ ʑ | | x |
| Approximant | | | ɫ | lʲ | | j | | |
| Trill | | | r | r̝ʲ | | | | |

=== Vowels ===
The early Old Polish vocalic system consisted of the following phonemes. As mentioned, the sound qualities are approximations.

| | front | central | back |
|---|---|---|---|
| close | i iː | [ɨ] [ɨː] | u uː |
| mid | ɛ ɛː | | ɔ ɔː |
| open | æ̃ æ̃ː | a aː | ɑ̃ ɑ̃ː |

[ɨ] and [ɨː] were in complementary distribution with [i] and [iː] respectively – the former occurred after hard consonants, the latter in all other positions. The pairs can therefore be regarded as allophones.

All vowel phonemes occurred in pairs, one short and one long. Long vowels emerged in Old Polish from four sources:

1. compensatory lengthening of vowels in penultimate syllables followed by a voiced consonant and a word-final yer, which was deleted (see Havlík's law)
  - examples: PS *rogъ > OP rōg, PS *gněvъ > OP gniēw, PS *stalъ > OP stāł
2. from the contraction of various sequences of two vowels separated by /j/
  - examples: PS *sějati > OP siāć, PS *dobrajego > OP dobrēgo, PS *rybojǫ > OP rybǭ
3. inherited from Proto-Slavic neoacute accent
  - examples: PS *pъtákъ > OP ptāk, PS *sǫ̃dъ > OP sø̄d, PS grě̃xъ > OP grzēch
4. inherited from Proto-Slavic pretonic long vowels in two-syllable words (so long vowels in the first syllable if the second syllable was final and stressed)
  - examples: PS *mǭkà > OP mø̄ka, PS *dě̄žà > OP dziēża, PS *dōltò > OP dłōto

Due to the lengthening described in 1. short vowels could not occur in word-final syllables before a voiced consonant. The only exceptions was short /ɛ/ from an older strong yer.

==== Prostheses ====
Similarly to some other Slavic languages and dialects, there existed a tendency to constrain the occurrence of vowels in word onset. A prosthetic [j], [w] or [h] was often introduced to words beginning with a vowel:

- Earlier *e, *ě received a prosthetic [j] already in Late Common Slavic: PS *edinъ > OP jeden, PS *ěsti > OP jeść. An exception was the dialectal conjunction eż, eże.
- Earlier *ę, *ǫ were also preceded by a prosthesis since the oldest records, [j] and [v] respectively: PS *ęzykъ > OP język, PS *ędro > OP jꟁdro, PS *ǫtroba > OP wꟁtroba, PS *ǫgľь > OP węgiel. To this day nasal vowels cannot begin a word in Polish.
- Earlier *a received a prosthetic [j] similarly to front vowels: PS *agoda > OP jagoda. Once again, an exception to this was a conjunction – a, very common to this day, as well as its derivatives: ale, aż, ani etc.
- Old Polish rounded vowels /ɔ, ɔː/ probably had a labial prosthesis [w], as is universal in dialects (e.g. [wɔkɔ] – /ɔkɔ/ – "oko"), but it was seldom marked in writing. Sometimes the spelling points to a prosthetic [h] instead, for both /ɔ, ɔː/ as well as /u, uː/ (a hon – "a on"; hupana Jana – "u pana Jana").
- Old Polish /i, iː/ seemed to have had a rather strong prosthetic [j], often made evident in spelling (np. gymyenyu [jimʲɛɲu] – "imieniu"). More rarely also [h] occurred.
- Loanwords were also affected, e.g. Jadam instead of "Adam", Jewa instead of "Ewa", Helska as a shortened form of "Elżbieta" ("Elizabeth").

==== Loss of vowel length ====
During the Old Polish period, vowel length ceased to be a feature distinguishing phonemes. The long high vowels /iː/, [ɨː] and /uː/ merged with their short counterparts, with no change in quality. The fate of the remaining long oral vowels was different; they also lost their length, but their articulation became more closed and so they remained distinct from their old short counterparts. Thus, /ɛː/ changed to /e/ and /ɔː/ changed to /o/. The earlier long /aː/ also gained roundedness and became /ɒ/. This process was long and only complete by the late 15th century. The higher vowels are traditionally called pochylone ("skewed") in Polish.

The nasal vowels developed differently. Old Polish continued to have four nasal vowels until the 14th century, when they merged in respect to quality, but retained the length distinction. Therefore, the new system had only two nasal vowels: short /ã/ (from earlier /æ̃/ and /ɑ̃/) and long /ãː/ (from earlier /æ̃ː/ and /ɑ̃ː/). In the 15th century when vowel length was disappearing the two nasals retained the old length distinction through changes in quality, like the other non-high vowels. The short nasal was fronted to /æ̃~ɛ̃/ and the long backed to /ɒ̃~ɔ̃/ and lost its length (both with differing dialectal realizations).

The described changes led to the creation of the late Old Polish vocalic system:

| | front | central | back |
|---|---|---|---|
| close | i | [ɨ] | u |
| mid | ɛ e | | ɔ o |
| open | æ̃~ɛ̃ | a | ɒ ɒ̃~ɔ̃ |

=== Accent ===
Although stress was never marked in writing, its development in Old Polish can be partially inferred from certain other phonetic changes.

In older works, the verbal suffix -i/-y of the 2nd & 3rd ps. sg. imp. is dropped in some verbs, but retained in others. A comparison with East Slavic languages shows that the suffix remained when it was stressed in Proto-Slavic. Examples:

- Bogurodzica spuści – Russian: спусти́, romanized: spustí
- Bogurodzica raczy – Russian: рачи́, romanized: račí
- Bogurodzica usłysz – Russian: услы́шь, romanized: uslýšʹ
- Sankt Florian Psalter chwali – Russian: хвали́, romanized: xvalí

Because of this and other evidence, it is thought that early Old Polish had free, lexical stress inherited from Proto-Slavic.

Occasional ellipsis of the second vowel in commonly used trisyllabic words and phrases in the 14th and 15th century (wieliki > wielki, ażeby > ażby, iże mu > iż mu, Wojeciech > Wojciech) point to the conclusion that by that time fixed initial stress had developed. The initial stress in the peripheral Podhale and southern Kashubian dialects (now considered a separate language but still part of the Lechitic dialect continuum) are taken to be remnants of earlier widespread initial stress. In the case of Podhale, Slovak influence is usually ruled out, because Slovak dialects bordering Podhale have penultimate rather than initial stress.

== Morphology ==
In this section, Old Polish sounds are spelled the same as their primary reflexes using modern Polish orthography, except that non-high long vowels are marked with a macron: ā, ē, ō. The represented state of the nasal vowels is that of the 14th century – two nasal vowels differing in length. This is represented by letters from modern Polish orthography; for example, ę for /ã/ and ꟁ for /ãː/, for the sake of easier comparison with modern forms and proper display.

=== Nouns ===
Old Polish nouns declined for seven cases: nominative, genitive, dative, accusative, instrumental, locative and vocative; three numbers: singular, dual, plural; and had one of three grammatical genders: masculine, feminine or neuter.

The following is a simplified table of Old Polish noun declension:

| | | Masculine (Note: Except for masculines in -a/-ā, which inflected wholly as the corresponding feminines.) | Neuter | Feminine | | |
| | | Masculine | Neuter | hard vocalic stems | soft vocalic stems | consonantal stems |
|---|---|---|---|---|---|---|
| Singular | Nom. | ∅ | -o -e -ē -ę | -a | -ā -a -i | ∅ |
| Singular | Gen. | -a -u | -a -ā | -y | -ē -i (-ēj) (-y) | -i |
| Singular | Dat. | -u -owi/-ewi | -u (-owi/-ewi) | -e | -i | |
| Singular | Acc. | =Nom. or =Gen. (Note: Identical to the nominative for inanimates. For animates identical to the genitive, occasionally identical to the nominative.) | =Nom. | -ę | -ꟁ -ę | ∅ |
| Singular | Ins. | -em | -em -im | -ꟁ | | |
| Singular | Loc. | -e -u (-i) | | -e | -i | |
| Singular | Voc. | -e -u | =Nom. | -o | -e (-o) | -i |
| Dual | Nom. Acc. | -a | -e -i | | | -i |
| Dual | Gen. Loc. | -u | | | | |
| Dual | Dat. Ins. | -oma | | -ama | | -ma |
| Plural | Nom. | -i -y -owie/-ewie -e | -a -ā | -y | -e | -i |
| Plural | Gen. | -ōw/-ēw -i (∅) | ∅ -i | ∅ | | -i (∅) |
| Plural | Dat. | -om -em (-am) | -om (-am) | -ām/-am (-om) | | |
| Plural | Acc. | -i -y -e | =Nom. | =Nom. | | |
| Plural | Ins. | -mi -y (-ami) | | -ami (-mi) (-y) | | -mi -ami |
| Plural | Loc. | -ech -och (-ach) | -ech (-och) (-ach) | -āch/-ach (-ech) | | -ech -och (-ach) |

Notes:

Forms in parentheses are encountered sporadically, or begin appearing at the very end of Old Polish period (during the transition to Middle Polish). Variants of one ending are separated by a slash (see below). The vocative of the dual and plural was identical to the nominative.

Although Old Polish inherited all of the inflectional categories of Proto-Slavic, the whole system was subject to a fundamental reorganization. The Proto-Slavic inflection paradigms were applied based on the shape of the stem, but this had been obscured by many phonetic changes. Consequently, the endings began being assigned based primarily on the lexical gender of nouns, which previously was not the primary consideration (although stem shape still played a role in certain cases), and the old declension classes gradually merged. Many endings were lost from Proto-Slavic and others, often those which were more distinct, took their place.

Although many of the above endings are the same as modern Polish, they did not necessarily have the same distribution. In classes which had a choice of two or more endings, these were commonly interchangeable, while in modern Polish, some words stabilized and only accept one.

==== Detailed description of some endings and categories ====
The modern Polish distinction in animacy in masculine declension was only beginning to appear in Old Polish. The most visible symptom of this trend was the use of the genitive of masculine animate nouns in the singular in place of the accusative. This was directly caused by the fact that the accusative of all masculine nouns used to be identical with the nominative, causing confusion as to which of two animate nouns was the subject and which the direct object due to free word order: Ociec kocha syn – "The father loves the son" or "The son loves the father". The use of the genitive for the direct object solves this issue: Ociec kocha syna – unambiguously "The father loves the son". Such forms are ubiquitous already in the oldest monuments of the language, although exceptions still happen occasionally.

The Proto-Slavic language had a variant cluster -ev-/-ov-, which occurred in some suffixes, such as the dative singular, nominative plural and genitive plural of masculine nouns. While in the proto-language -ev- regularly occurred after soft consonants, and the equivalent -ov- – after hard consonants, in Old Polish this variance was disrupted. There came a tendency to regularize one of them, and so southern Poland: Lesser Poland and Silesia, generalize -ow- to all positions, while Greater Poland generalizes -ew-. Masovia until the 15th century used -ew- as in Greater Poland, but a subsequent rapid expansion of -ow- almost completely replaces -ew- in the next century. Eventually the forms with -ow- have made their way to the literary language: Modern Polish -ów, -owie and -owi.

Feminine endings of the dative and locative plural had two variants: older endings with a long vowel -ām and -āch, and younger endings with a short vowel – -am and -ach. The shortening might have been caused either by frequent usage, or by leveling of the suffix to the nominative singular -a.

=== Verbs ===
Old Polish verbs conjugated for three persons; three numbers, singular, dual and plural; two moods, declarative and imperative; and had one of two lexical aspects, perfective or imperfective. There was also the analytical conditional mood, formed by the aorist of the verb być ("to be") and an old participle form.

Significant changes from Proto-Slavic occurred in the usage of tenses. The ancient aorist and imperfect tenses were already in the process of disappearing when the language was first attested. In the oldest texts of the 14th and 15th century, only 26 existed, and neither tenses show the whole inflection paradigm. The only exception was the aorist of być, which survived and came to be used to form the conditional mood.

The role of the past tense was taken up by a new analytical formation, composed of the present of być and the old L-participle of a verb.

==== Conjugation of "to be" (Present) and personal pronouns ====
| Pronoun (OP) | Old Polish (OP) | Modern Polish (MP) |
|---|---|---|
| Ja | jeśm | jestem |
| Ty | jeś | jesteś |
| On, ona, ono | jeść, jest | jest |
| My | jesmy | jesteśmy |
| Wy | jeste (< PS *este) | jesteście |
| Oni | są | są |

== Literature ==
- The Bull of Gniezno (Polish: Bulla gnieźnieńska), a papal bull written in Latin that contains 410 Polish names, published 7 July 1136 (This document can be viewed in Polish wikisource)
- Mother of God (Polish: Bogurodzica), between the 10th and 13th centuries, the oldest known Polish national anthem
- The Book of Henryków (Polish: Księga henrykowska, Latin: Liber fundationis), which is written in Latin but contains the earliest known sentence written in the Polish language
- The Holy Cross Sermons (Polish: Kazania świętokrzyskie), 14th century
- Sankt Florian Psalter (Polish: Psałterz floriański), 14th century, a psalmody that consists of parallel Latin, Polish and German texts
- Master Polikarp's Dialog with Death (Polish: Rozmowa Mistrza Polikarpa ze Śmiercią, Latin: De morte prologus, Dialogus inter Mortem et Magistrum Polikarpum), verse poetry, early 15th century
- Lament of the Holy Cross (Polish: Lament świętokrzyski, also known as: Żale Matki Boskiej pod krzyżem or Posłuchajcie Bracia Miła), late 15th century
- Bible of Queen Sophia (Polish: Biblia królowej Zofii), first Polish Bible translation, 15th century
- Bożena Sieradzka-Baziur, ed. (2011–2015). Słownik pojęciowy języka staropolskiego [Conceptual Dictionary of Old Polish] (in Polish). Kraków: IJP PAN. ISBN 978-83-64007-23-1.

== Sample text ==
Ach, Królu wieliki nasz
Coż Ci dziejꟁ Maszyjasz,
Przydaj rozumu k'mej rzeczy,
Me sierce bostwem obleczy,
Raczy mię mych grzechów pozbawić
Bych mógł o Twych świętych prawić.

(The introduction to The Legend of Saint Alexius – 15th century)

== See also ==
- Middle Polish
- Modern Polish
- History of Polish
- History of Polish orthography

== Bibliography ==
- Kuraszkiewicz, Władysław (1972). Gramatyka historyczna języka polskiego (in Polish). Warszawa: Państwowe Zakłady Wydawnictw Szkolnych.
- Klemensiewicz, Zenon (1985). Historia języka polskiego (in Polish). Warszawa: Państwowe Wydawnictwo Naukowe. ISBN 83-01-06443-9.
- Rospond, Stanisław (1973). Gramatyka historyczna języka polskiego (in Polish). Warszawa: Państwowe Wydawnictwo Naukowe.
- Mańczak, Witold (1983). Polska fonetyka i morfologia historyczna (in Polish). Warszawa: Państwowe Wydawnictwo Naukowe. ISBN 83-01-05387-9.
- Stieber, Zdzisław (1966). Historyczna i współczesna fonologia języka polskiego (in Polish). Warszawa: Państwowe Wydawnictwo Naukowe.
