= Krzysztof Buzalski =

Polish politician

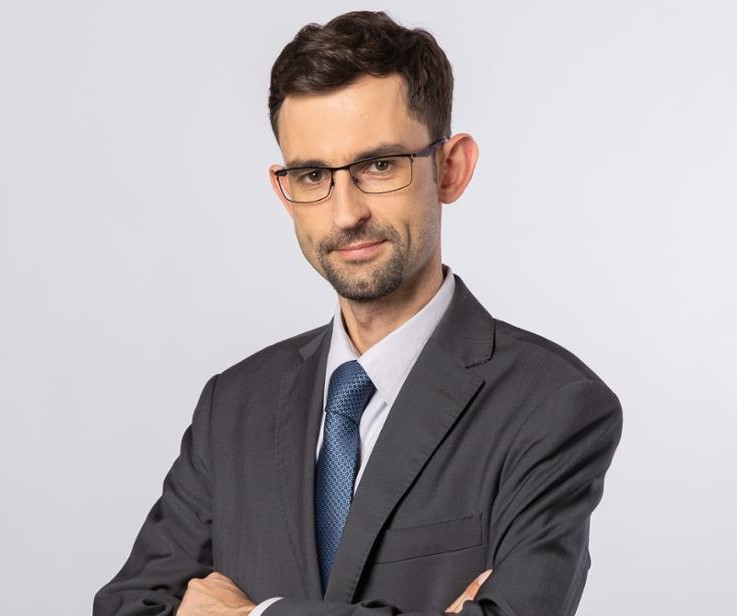

9th Poland Ambassador to Tanzania
- In office 3 December 2017 – July 2024
- Preceded by: Wojciech Bożek
- Succeeded by: Sergiusz Wolski

Personal details
- Children: 2
- Education: University of Gdańsk
- Profession: Diplomat

Krzysztof Buzalski is a Polish diplomat in the rank of Minister-Counsellor specializing in relations with Sub-Saharan Africa countries, Poland ambassador to Tanzania (2017–2024).

== Life ==
Krzysztof Buzalski was educated at the University of Gdańsk, Faculty of Law (2000). He has also finished the National School of Public Administration (2004) and the Diplomatic Academy of the Ministry of Foreign Affairs (2006).

In 2006 he worked at the Polish embassy and consulate general in London. Then he worked at the MFA Department of Development Cooperation being responsible for implementation of development projects in Africa. Between 2007 and 2008 he was the deputy head of mission at the embassy in Dar es Salaam, in charge of political, development and consular affairs. In 2008 he returned to the Department of Development Cooperation. From November 2009 to July 2015 he has been the deputy ambassador at the embassy in Addis Ababa covering economic and political relations with Ethiopia, Djibouti, South Sudan and, on multilateral level, with the African Union.

Between July 2015 and December 2017 he was in positions of the head of Sub-Saharan Africa Unit and then the deputy director of the Department of Africa and the Middle East responsible for cooperation with sub-Saharan Africa and horizontal issues. Since 3 December 2017 he holds the post of ambassador to Tanzania, accredited to Rwanda, Malawi, Burundi and the Comoros. He ended his mission in July 2024.

He speaks English, Spanish, French, German, and Swahili languages. He is married, with two children.
