= Middle Polish =

Earlier form of the Polish language spoken between the 16th and 18th centuries

- Region: Central and Eastern Europe
- Era: developed into Modern Polish by the 18th century
- Language family: Indo-European: Balto-Slavic; Slavic; West Slavic; Lechitic; East Lechitic; Middle Polish
- Early form: Old Polish
- Writing system: Latin

Language codes
- ISO 639-3: –
- Glottolog: None

Middle Polish (Polish: język średniopolski) is the period in the history of the Polish language between the 16th and 18th centuries. It evolved from Old Polish, and gave rise to Modern Polish.

== Spelling ==
Many various orthographies were proposed to standardize Polish orthography, including Stanisław Zaborowski's in 1514, Jan Seklucjan's in 1549, Stanisław Murzynowski's in 1551, and Onufry Kopczyński's grammars of 1778 and 1785, all with varying degrees of success.

== Phonology ==
Middle Polish's phonology differs from both Old Polish's and Modern Polish's, mainly in the vowels, but also somewhat in the consonants.

=== Consonants ===
The consonant system of Middle Polish differs little from that of Old Polish.

The clusters ir/irz/yr/yrz lowered to ér/érz and ultimately to er/erz.

czyrwony > czérwony > czerwony

Similarly, the clusters il/ił/yl/ył sporadically and non-permanently lowered to el/eł.

był > beł

There was also a tendency for prenasal raising.

lepiánka > lepionka
tam > tąm
dom > dóm
nasienie > nasinie

Or, conversely, sometimes vowels lowered.

słuńce > słońce

One major change was a depalatalization of the consonants /t͡sʲ/, /d͡zʲ/, /t͡ʃ/, /d͡ʒ/, /ʃ/, and /ʒ/ to /t͡s/, /d͡z/, /t͡ʂ/, /d͡ʐ/, /ʂ/, and /ʐ/ respectively.

The consonant /rʲ/ also underwent depalatalization, going from /rʲ/ to /rʐ/, to /ʐ/ by the end of the sixteenth century.

Labials underwent depalatalization in coda position.

Around 1600 L-vocalization, known as wałczenie in Polish, begins (see History of the Polish language § Proto-Slavic *l *ĺ *lj), ultimately being completed in the Modern Polish era. However, wałczenie is absent in some modern dialects.

There was some wavering as to the softness of sibilants, as well.

ślak/szlak
prozno/prożno
snicerz/sznicerz
synogarlica/sinogarlica

The final consonant system at the end of the Middle Polish period was thus:

| | Labial | | Coronal | | Post- alveolar | Palatal | Velar | |
| | hard | soft | hard | soft | soft | soft | soft | hard |
|---|---|---|---|---|---|---|---|---|
| Nasal | m | mʲ | n | | | ɲ | | |
| Stop | p b | pʲ bʲ | t d | | | | [kʲ] [ɡʲ] | k ɡ |
| Affricate | | | | t͡s d͡z | t͡ʂ d͡ʐ | t͡ɕ d͡ʑ | | |
| Fricative | f v | fʲ vʲ | s z | | ʂ ʐ | ɕ ʑ | | x |
| Approximant | | | ɫ~w | lʲ | | j | | |
| Trill | | | r | | | | | |

=== Vowels ===
Middle Polish inherited Old Polish's late vowel system.

| | front | central | back |
|---|---|---|---|
| close | i | [ɨ] | u |
| mid | ɛ e | | ɔ o |
| open | æ̃~ɛ̃ | a | ɒ ɒ̃~ɔ̃ |

At first there were two groups of vowels, so-called "clear" vowels (Polish "jasne") (transcribed /a, ɛ, i, ɔ, u, ɨ/) and the so-called "slanted" vowels (Polish "pochylone") (transcribed /ɒ, e, o/), which arose from Old Polish long vowels.

There was a tendency for the pitched vowels to merge with some neighboring non-pitched vowel.

é > e/y/i rzékę > rzekę, dobrémi > dobrymi
á > a mám > mam
ó > u (still) written ó skóra > skóra (used in poetry to rhyme with dziura)

Nasal /æ̃~ɛ̃/ raised and fronted to /ɛ̃/, whereas /ɒ̃~ɔ̃/ raised and back to /ɔ̃/, however there was some irregular shifting of nasal vowels, e.g. variations of ciążyć/ciężyć, as well as spontaneous nasalization, e.g. czestować > częstować.

The final vowel system was more or less similar to Modern Polish's vowel system.

| | front | central | back |
|---|---|---|---|
| close | i | [ɨ] | u |
| mid | ɛ ɛ̃ | | ɔ ɔ̃ |
| open | | a~ɒ | |

=== Accent ===
Already in the 15th century one can find tendencies of fixing stress on the penultimate syllable, ultimately solidifying giving the modern Polish stress system. Between the 16th and 17th centuries, there was also a tendency to include enclitics in the stress pattern, e.g. bo'ję się, moż'na by, which did not continue. As this was happening, syncope occurred in words ending with -yja and -ija, exclusively Latin borrowings, where the -y- or -i- was dropped. Sometimes these forms can still be seen in liturgical songs or prayers, such as "Zdrowaś Maryjo".

Maryja > Maria
historyja > historia

== Morphology ==
Middle Polish inflection is characterized by a standardization of inflections. One of the major changes was the gradual loss of the dual, which ultimately only remain within certain nouns such as ucho, oko, and ręka.

=== Nouns ===
Masculine plurals are separated further by animacy, resulting in a more stable system of three levels of animacy, inanimate, animate, and virile. The biggest change was the separation of animate and virile. Before, one could see the virile plural psi (dogs), with psy being the animate plural. Nouns changed their level of animacy during this period to some degree, for example the animate nominative and accusative plural filozofy (philosophers) instead of the now nominative virile plural filozofowie and the genitive and accusative virile plural filozofów, ultimately settling in the 16th century.

This change ultimately affected the government of adjectives, verbs, pronouns, numerals, and participles, which all began to change their endings depending on the level animacy of the given noun.

For masculine nouns in the genitive singular we see wavering between -u and -a, which lasts to this day. Similarly, there is some shifting in the singular dative between -u and -owi, with -owi ultimately becoming more popular and -u being the dative singular only for a few nouns. In the plural, we see either -ów or -i/-y for nouns ending in -rz or -ż, which continues to this day.

The softening masculine singular locative ending -e after velars changes to -u, retained to this day.

człowiek > człowiece > człowieku
bóg > bodze > bogu
grzech > grzesze > grzechu

At the end of the 16th century we see a loss of the ending -i/-y for the instrumental plural and a generalization of the ending -mi as well as the proscribed -ami, used originally only for feminine nouns in the instrumental plural. Nowadays the endings -i/-y can only be seen in fossilized phrases such as "ostatnimi czasy" and "innymi słowy".

Masculine and neuter nouns also underwent a generalization, originally ending with the suffix -ech, or in the Lesser Poland dialect -och, now ending in -ách, which later changed to -ach.

Feminine nouns in the nominative originally sometimes ended in either -a for hard stems and -á for soft stems, with -á ultimately dying off either due to sound changes, analogy, or both. Nouns ending in the clear -a took -ę in the accusative singular whereas those ending in -á took -ą. When -á merged with -a, the two accusative endings were kept for a short time, but ultimately -ę became the standard ending due to analogy.

The original genitive ending for feminine soft stems was -e, changing to -i/-y. One could also sometimes find -ej for this declension, as well as for feminine dative soft stems, but this did not last.

Feminine nouns in the dative plural changed from -am/-ám to -om, matching the masculine and neuter dative plural ending. There are a few instances of masculine nouns taking the feminine -am/-ám endings, however, but they were rare.

Neuter nouns endings in pitched -é had a singular instrumental ending -im that later changed to -em.

=== Possessive pronouns and adjectives ===
In the 18th century the ending -ą for feminine singular accusative possessive pronouns began to supplant the ending -ę.

twoję > twoją

There was also variation in the masculine singular instrumental and locative ending in -emi and -ymi, which lasted even in the orthography until the orthographical reform of 1936.

nowemi > nowymi

In the 16th century we see a replacement of -i/-y by -e for the masculine and accusative non-virile plural.

ty (from ten) słowa > te słowa
wszystki > wszystkie

Also in the 16th century we see -ej replace -e for feminine singular genitive.

sługa wieczne mądrości > sługa wiecznej mądrości

=== Verbs ===
The Middle Polish verb system doesn't differ too much from either the Old Polish or modern Polish verb system, however it is not identical. Some changes include:

1. A loss of the ending -ęcy as the active adjectival participle for feminine subjects, being replaced by -ący
2. A replacement of the old imperative ending -i/y with -ij/-yj or a null morpheme
  zamkni > zamknij
  zetrzy > zetrzyj
  weźmi > weź
3. A loss of the analytical past as well as aorist in favor of the new morphemes. However, the aorist was kept in Silesian
  robił jestem/robiłech > robiłem
4. The conditional mood, originally formed with the aorist endings, was replaced by forms from the Proto Slavic participles, influenced by their use as past tense forms.
  bych > bym

== Bibliography ==
- Klemensiewicz, Zenon (1999). Historia języka polskiego (in Polish). Warszawa: Państwowe Wydawnictwo Naukowe. ISBN 83-01-12760-0.
