= History of Polish orthography =

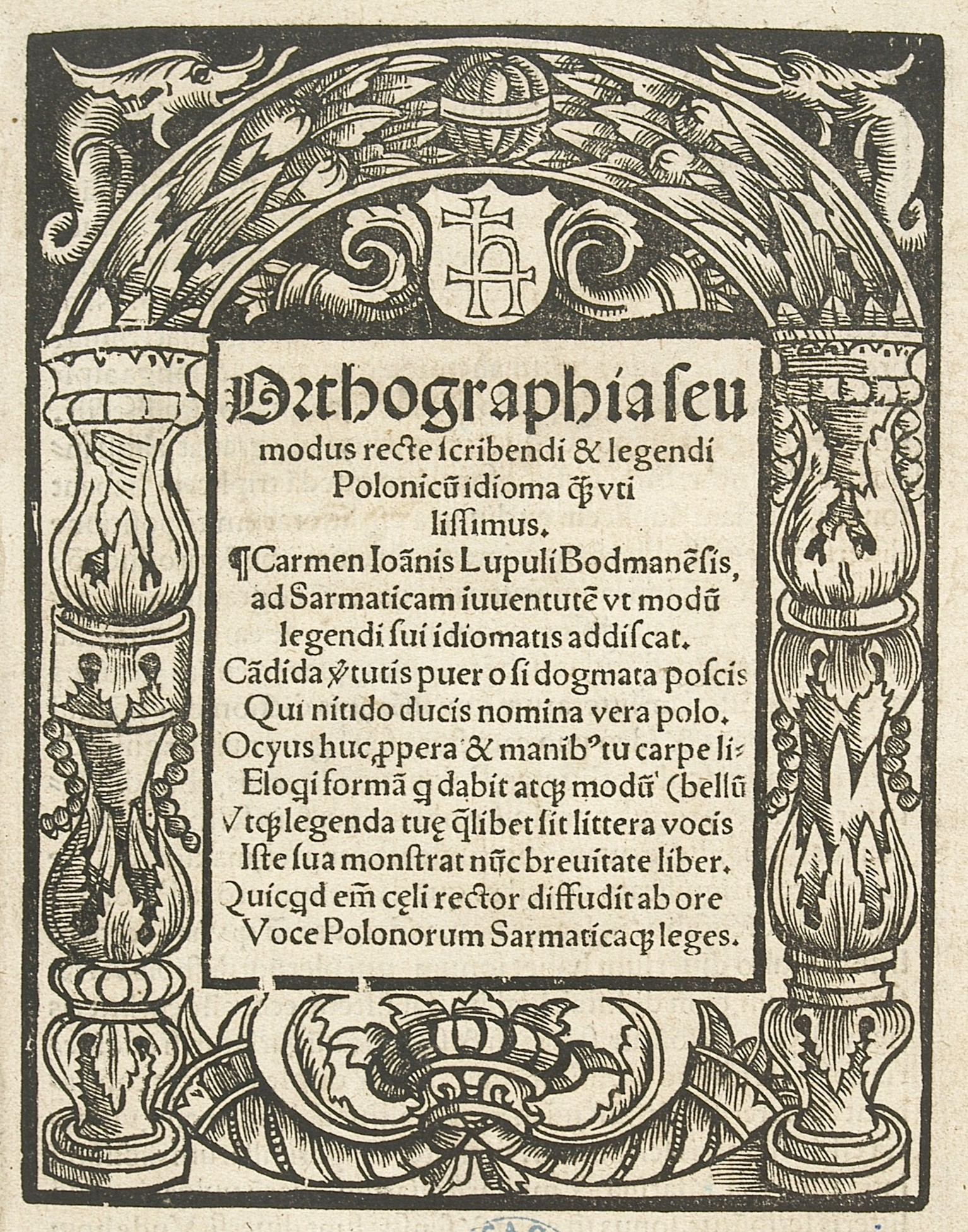
Stanisław Zaborowski "Ortographia" 1518.

History of Polish orthography describes the various forms that written Polish has taken since people first began writing the Polish language through to the modern day.

== Old Polish (before 1500) ==
Poles began writing in Polish in the 12th century using the Latin alphabet. This alphabet, however, was ill-equipped to deal with Polish phonology, particularly the palatal consonants (now written as ś, ź, ć, dź), the retroflex group (now sz, ż, and cz) as well as the nasal vowels (now written as ą, ę). Consequently, Polish spelling in the Middle Ages was highly inconsistent as writers struggled to adapt the Latin alphabet to the needs of the Polish language. There was no unified system; different writers came up with different systems before the modern Polish orthography was firmly established.

In the earliest documents the letter c could signify c, cz, or k while the letter z was used for ś, z, ź, and ż. Writers soon began to experiment with digraphs (combinations of letters), new letters (ꟁ and ſ), and eventually diacritics.

Orthography examples from the Bull of Gniezno (1136) and the Holy Cross Sermons (13th-14th centuries)
Modern	Old Polish	Examples (with modern orthography in brackets)
Nasal vowels (ą, ę)	am, an, e, em, en, o, um, un, ꟁ (for any nasal vowel)	Dambnizia (= Dębnica ), Chrustov (= Chrząstów), sꟁ (= się), sa (= są)
ć	c, ch, cz, t	Chotan (= Chocian), cynich (= czynić), czyalo (= ciało)
cz	c, ch, che	Lunciz (= Łęczyca), Bichek (= Byczek), rech (= rzecz), uciny (= uczyni)
dz	c, cz, dz, z	Zeraz (= Sieradz), drudzi (= drudzy), doracy (= doradzi), pyenyącz (= pieniądz)
i	i, y	faly (= chwali), ubogy (= ubogi)
j	g, i, j, y	ienze, iaco (= jako), Voibor
k	c, ck, k	Cochan (= Kochan), Curassek (= Kurasek), ktore (= które), taco (= tako), peckle (= piekle)
rz	r, rz	np. Krisan (= Krzyżan), przichodzi (= przychodzi), grzechow (= grzechów)
s	s, ss, z	gloz (= głos), gest, sstokrocz (= stokroć)
ś	s, sch, ssy, sy	swyata (= świata), swyeczską (= świeczką), prossycz (= prosić), syadl (= siadł)
sz	s, sch, ss, sz	Calis (= Kalisz), Gneuos (= Gniewosz), schuka (= szuka), napelnysz (= napełnisz), masch (= masz)
t	t, th	themu (= temu), thu (= tu)
u	u, v	trvdnem, uznaie (= uznaje), vczil (= uczył), Bogvmil (= Bogumił)
w	u, v	Vsemir, vmoch (= w moc), pouaba
y	i, y	gdi (= gdy), przigani (= przygani), cynili (= czynili)
ź	sy, z, zy	zyemya (= ziemia), priiazny (= przyjaźń)
ż	s, z	yze (= iże), urazonego (= urażonego)

=== 1440 Reform ===
Jakub Parkoszowic (Jacobus Parcossii) in 1440 was the first to attempt to introduce an orthographic reform titled Traktat o ortografii polskiej (Treatise on Polish Orthography) that was ultimately failed and was not rediscovered until 1830.

In it he suggests the use of doubling vowels to represent vowel length, a feature of Old and Middle Polish. He also suggests the use of ꟁ for nasal vowels and ÿ for the phoneme /ɨ/, as well as a number of digraphs and trigraphs.

== Middle Polish (1500–1750) ==
Several grammarians attempted to introduce orthographic standards in the Middle Polish period, with varying success.

=== Stanisław Zaborowski's Orthography of 1514–1515 ===
Around 1514, Stanisław Zaborowski wrote Orthographia seu modus recte scribendi et legendi Polonicum idioma quam utilissimus ("Orthography, that is the most useful way of correct writing and reading in the Polish language"). In it, he attempts to fill the gaps left by the writing system used by Latin by including digraphs and diacritics.

Łacinnicy naznaczają liter różniących się między sobą nazwiskiem i postacią 23. Nam Polakom nie potrzeba ich więcey: albowiem i nasz ięzyk niemi obeyjść się może: chociaż co do brzmienia iedna i ta sama litera z innemi połączona (consyllabica) rozmaicie się wymawia: co się i u Łacinków zdarza.

Latin speakers distinguish 23 letters differing from each other by name and shape. We Poles do not need more: because our language can get by without them: however, as to the sound, one and the same letter when combined with others (consyllabica) is pronounced in various ways: which also happens to Latin speakers.

— Stanisław Zaborowski, Księdza Stanisława Zaborowskiego Ortografija polska z przydaniem uwag tłómacza, tudzież Ortografii Seklucyana i spisu bibliograficznego grammatyk i Słowników polskich, page 5

He expresses disdain for the usage of g for the sound /j/, particularly in native words.

Aby się nie więc mieszały polskie wyrazy, niech się w nich kładzie i, ieśliby brzmiało, a nie g, iakoto: moiá, twoiá, moi, twoi, i t. d.

And so in order to not confuse Polish terms, let i be written in them, if it sounds thus, and not g, for example moiá, twoiá, moi, twoi, etc.

— Stanisław Zaborowski, Księdza Stanisława Zaborowskiego Ortografija polska z przydaniem uwag tłómacza, tudzież Ortografii Seklucyana i spisu bibliograficznego grammatyk i Słowników polskich, page 9

His decisions were informed by Parkoszowic's attempted reform as well as Czech.

>R. w polskim ięzyku dwoiakie ma brzmienie: iedno łacińskim i polskim wyrazom spólne, drugie niewłaściwé, które pospolicie pisać zwykli tak: rz. Czesi zaś takie r sposobem przyciskowych czyli niewłaściwych liter, kropkę u góry kładąc, znaczyć zwykli tak ṙ (z kropką) co iest daleko iednostayniéy.

R in the Polish language has two sounds: one is common to both Latin and Polish, the other is improper, which is commonly written thus: rz. The Czechs however write this r in a way of accented, that is, improper letters, placing a dot on top, to mark it usually as thus ṙ (with a dot) which is unchanging.

— Stanisław Zaborowski, Księdza Stanisława Zaborowskiego Ortografija polska z przydaniem uwag tłómacza, tudzież Ortografii Seklucyana i spisu bibliograficznego grammatyk i Słowników polskich, page 12

He proposed the following letters: a, á, ạ, ą, b, b̈, c, c̈, ċ, d, ď, d̈, ḋ, e, ē, f, g, g̈, h, i, ī, k, k̈, l, ł, m, m̈, n, n̈, o, ō, p, p̈, r, ṙ, s, s̈, ṡ, t, u, v, v̈, w, ẅ, x, ẍ, ẋ, y, z, z̈, ż.

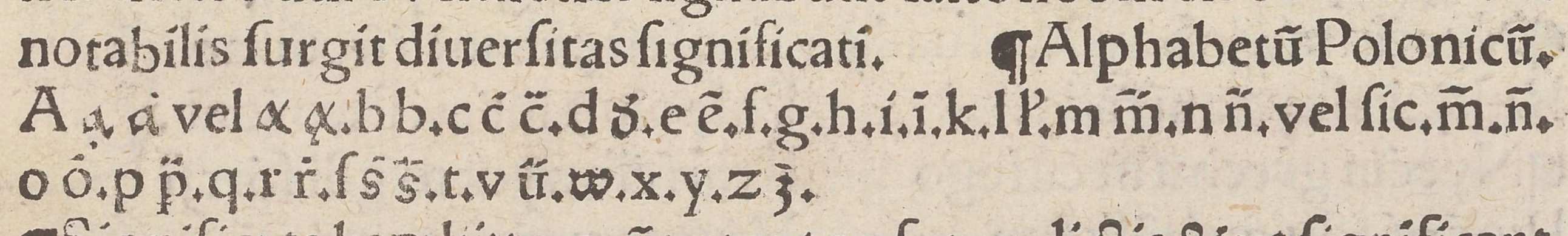
Zaborowski's alphabet in 1518.

The orthography was not used in many works, however it influenced works such as Raj duszny printed around 1513 and Początek święte Ewanielije podług świętego Jana around 1518/1519.

=== Seklucjan's grammar of 1549 ===
In 1549 Jan Seklucjan (Joannis Seclvcianus) wrote Krótka a prosta nauka czytania i pisania języka polskiego ("A short and simple study of reading and writing in the Polish language"), in which he laments the difficulty of reading Polish.

Pismo polskie jest trudne ku czytaniu tym ktorzy włosności buchstabow przekreszonych albo pąktowany nie rozumieją.

Polish writing is difficult to read for those who don't understand letters either marked with diacritics or dots.

— Jan Seklucjan, Krótka a prosta nauka czytania i pisania języka polskiego, A6

In this book, he introduced 11 vowel letters, a, â, ą, e, ę, i, o, u, ü, w, y. At this time, the phonemes /i/ and /ɨ/ were still not often distinguished, and in the work itself one can find examples such as "gdi" (modern gdy).

=== Murzynowski's reform of 1551 ===
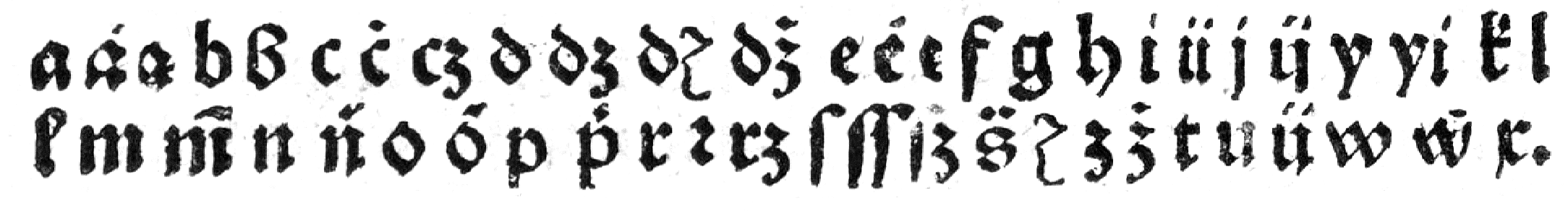
Murzynowski's alphabet in 1551.

In response to Seklucjan's grammar, Stanisław Murzynowski wrote Ortografija polská. To jest nauka pisániá i czytaniá języka polskié(go), ilé Polákowi potrzebá, niewielem słów dostatecznie wypisaná (Polish orthography, that is learning to read and write the Polish language, as much as Poles need, written in sufficient but few words) in 1551. In it, Murzynowski introduced 51 graphemes.

Most notably, the long vowels were distinguished with an acute accent, the so-called slanted (pochylone) vowels (á, é, ó), palatalized consonants were distinguished using a diacritic b̍, p̍, and v̍, modern bi, pi, and wi, the character ċ was also introduced to represent /t͡ɕ/ (modern ć), which caused some controversy, as the letter was already used mostly in the digraph ċz (modern cz). A special letter ɀ was suggested for the sound /ʑ/, and along with it the digraph dɀ for /d͡ʑ/ (modern dź and dzi). The letter s̈ for the sound /ɕ/. The ligature ß and the digraphs ſſ and ſs (modern sz) were suggested for /ʂ/.

Murzynowski also suggested that the letter x be used to represent the sounds /ks/ and /kɕ/ in loanwords.

Before, the sounds /i/ and /j/ were often written using only the grapheme i, as in Latin; however, they were at times distinguished, namely in the Polish translation of the New Testament using the letters i and y respectively. Murzynowski was the first to suggest the two sounds be systematically distinguished and introduced the letter j, and the usage of g to represent /j/ dropped. He also suggested the use of yj for the sound /ɨj/, as is the case in modern Polish, as it was previously unwritten.

przyjdzi, przyjmi. Zaráz to wymáwiáć mamy. Cze(go) drudzy nie wiedząc, piszą przydzi, przymi miasto przyjdzi, przyjmi, abo przéjdzi, przéjmi, ale to oboje nic ku rzeczy, zwłászcza przéjdzi, przéjmi. Bo inszą rzecz znaczą niż przyjdzi, przyjmi, jako gdy mowięm przejdzi przez tę rzékę, przéjmi moje konie rć.

przyjdzi, przyjmi. That is now what we should pronounce. Those who don't know write przydzi, przymi instead of przyjdzi, przyjmi, or przéjdzi, przéjmi, but neither is right, especially przéjdzi, przéjmi. Because that means something else than przyjdzi, przyjmi, as when I say przejdzi przez tę rzékę, przéjmi moje konie rć.

— Stanisław Murzynowski, Ortografija polská. To jest nauka pisániá i czytaniá języka polskié(go), ilé Polákowi potrzebá, niewielem słów dostatecznie wypisaná

=== Onufry Kopczyński ===
Onufry Kopczyński wrote his grammars on the commission of Towarzystwo do Ksiąg Elementarnych, a department of Towarzystwo do Ksiąg Elementarnych. He spent several chapters in Grammatyka dla szkół narodowych na klassę 1 and Grammatyka dla szkół narodowych na klassę 2 on what correct punctuation should be, which was not usually discussed in previous orthography books.

== Modern Polish (1750–present) ==
Many of the standards introduced in the previous centuries ultimately fell out of use, leading to the reforms of the 19th century.

=== 19th century ===
In 1816 Alojzy Feliński published Przyczyny używanej przeze mnie pisowni in Pisma własne i przekładania wiérszem Aloizego Felińskiego. In it, he suggested the following changes:

1. Removal of á in favor of a.
2. The usage of j for /j/ instead of i and y, except in foreign words: kray ⟶ kraj, iayko ⟶ jajko, moie ⟶ moje.
3. The usage of -ć, -c, -dz in infinitives: być, piec, módz (modern móc).

Then in 1830 the Warsaw Society of Friends of Learning published Rozprawy i wnioski o ortografii polskiej, but it did not reach a wider audience.

In 1890, the committee Academy of Learning was established and composed of linguists and other academics. A year later, they published their resolutions, to which Jan Baudouin de Courtenay, Aleksander Brückner, Antoni Kalina, Jan Karłowicz, and Adam Kryński protested. The two groups attempted to reach an agreement through discussions in 1906 led by Jan Baudouin de Courtenay. The following changes were suggested:

1. ja instead of ia, ya in final syllables.
2. gie instead of ge.
3. -im, -ym as well as -imi, -ymi alongside -emi in masculine adjectives in instrumental and locative.
4. -c instead of -dz for some infinitives, for example móc.
5. Anterior adverbial participles without internal ł: rzekszy, zjadszy.

The Provisional Council of State requested in 1916 that the following changes be implemented, but the Lwów Scientific Society voiced opposition, and yet more compromise was to be found in more committees organized in 1917. Finally, in 1918, the following changes were accepted and adopted.

1. The usage of j in non-initial syllables was accepted.
2. -em, -emi were to be differentiated from -ym, -ymi for instrumental and locative according to an adjective's nominative ending.
3. ke and ge were to be written in loan words, and kie and gie were to be written in native and nativized words.
4. -c for some infinitives was kept.
5. Anterior adverbial participles were to be written with an internal ł: zjadłszy.

However, despite all this, the proposed orthographic changes were not widely accepted, which led to the final reform, which took place in 1936.

=== 1936 reform ===
In 1935, the Polish Academy of Arts and Sciences initiated a major orthographic reform. The following changes were proposed and implemented:

1. Strings of consonants + ja (e.g. Marja) would now be written with i instead of j, except after c, s, z (e.g. Francja, pasja, diecezja).
2. Removal of the distinction of -ym, -ymi and -em, -emi in adjectives, leaving only -ym and -ymi.
3. Foreign ke would be written kie, but foreign ge as ge.
4. A preference for writing adverbialized prepositional phrases separately (e.g. na razie).

The article also concerns capitalization and punctuation. The changes were met with disapproval. However, through government regulation and implementation in schools, the changes eventually became standard. Since then, only minor changes regarding the spelling of foreign words have been implemented.

=== 2026 reform ===
In May 2024, the Polish Language Council announced that there will be changes implemented to the Polish orthography.

Namely:

1. Capitalization of demonyms but allowing alternative case spellings of unofficial ethnic names, mostly colloquial synonyms, e.g. Warszawianin; but: kitajec or Kitajec.
2. Capitalization of the names of companies and brands of industrial products, but also products of these companies and brands, e.g. samochód marki Ford (a car made by the Ford company) and pod oknem zaparkował czerwony Ford (a red Ford parked under the window).
3. Conjunctions and the particles -bym, -byś, -by, -byśmy, -byście spelled with a space, e.g. Zastanawiam się, czy by nie pojechać w góry.
4. Exceptionless spaceless spelling of nie- + participles/gerunds, e.g. niegotowany, niegotujący.
5. Lower-case spelling of adjectives ending in -owski derived from personal names, regardless of meaning (i.e. either belonging to the person as a possession or having characteristics associated with that person), e.g. utwór mickiewiczowski (meaning either a work written by Mickiewicz or a work in the style of Mickiewicz but written by someone else). Those formed with -ów, -owy, -in, and -yn may be spelled with either an upper-case letter or a lower-case letter, e.g. jacków dom or Jacków dom.
6. Spaceless spelling for the prefix pół-, e.g. półzabawa, półnauka, półżartem, półserio, półspał, półczuwał, except with proper nouns referring to a single person, e.g. pół-Polka, pół-Francuzka.
7. Terms that sound similar or identical, usually appearing together, now allow for three spelling versions: with a hyphen, e.g. tuż-tuż, trzask-prask, bij-zabij; with a comma, e.g. tuż, tuż, trzask, prask, bij, zabij; or with a space, e.g. tuż tuż, trzask prask, bij zabij.
8. Changes in the use of capital letters in proper names include:
  1. capital letters for all parts of comet names, e.g. Kometa Halleya;
  2. ~~capital letters for all parts of multi-word geographical and place names whose second part is a noun in the nominative case, e.g. Morze Marmara~~ (this point was removed in November 2025);
  3. capital letters in the names of public spaces, including the terms aleja, brama, bulwar, osiedle, plac, park, kopiec, kościół, klasztor, pałac, willa, zamek, most, molo, pomnik, cmentarz, but not ulica, e.g. ulica Józefa Piłsudskiego, Aleja Róż, Brama Warszawska, Plac Zbawiciela, Park Kościuszki, Kopiec Wandy, Kościół Mariacki, Pałac Staszica, Zamek Książ, Most Poniatowskiego, Pomnik Ofiar Getta, Cmentarz Rakowicki;
  4. capital letters for all elements except prepositions and conjunctions in multi-word names of service and catering establishments, e.g. Hotel pod Różą, Zajazd u Kmicica;
  5. capital letters of all elements except prepositions, conjunctions, and the word imienia (or its abbreviation im.) in the names of orders, medals, decorations, awards, and honorary titles, e.g. Nagroda Rektora za Wybitne Osiągnięcia Naukowe, Nagroda Newsweeka im. Teresy Torańskiej.
9. Changes in the writing of prefixes include:
  1. prefixed words, of native or foreign origin alike, should be written together, except if the base word is capitalized, in which case a hyphen is added after the prefix, e.g. superbohater but super-Polak;
  2. alternative spellings either with or without a space for mostly foreign prefixes, e.g.: super-, ekstra-, eko-, wege-, mini-, maksi-, midi-, mega-, makro-, which can also appear as independent words, e.g. miniwieża or mini wieża (as mini can also function as an invariable adjective as in wieża mini);
  3. words modified with niby- and quasi- should be written together, unless they start with a capital letter, e.g. quasicząstka but niby-Anglik.
10. Adjectives and adjectival adverbs, regardless of degree, prefixed with nie- should be written without a space, e.g. niegorszy and nienajlepszy.

== See also ==
- Polish orthography
- Cyrillization of Polish under the Russian Empire
- Old Polish language
- Middle Polish
- History of Polish language
- Polish phonology
- Help:IPA/Polish
