= Andrzej Gawroński (linguist) =

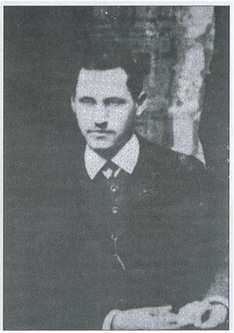

Andrzej Gawroński (20 June 1885 in Geneva – 11 January 1927 in Józefów, in the vicinity of Warsaw) was a Polish Indologist, linguist and polyglot. Professor of Jagiellonian University and Lwów University, (starting in 1916), the author of the first Polish handbook on Sanskrit (Podręcznik sanskrytu, 1932), founder of Polish Oriental Society (1922) and one of the founders of the Polish Linguistic Society (1925).

== Life ==
He was the son of Franciszek Rawita-Gawroński (a historian, writer and a columnist of the nationalistic press) and Antonina Miłkowska (a teacher and a translator), and the grandson of Teodor Tomasz Jeż. He attended an elementary school in Lwów and secondary schools in Przemyśl and Lwów. He graduated in Linguistics from the University of Lwów and University of Leipzig (1902–1906). Suffered from pulmonary tuberculosis, which was the cause of his death at the age of 42.

=== Education ===
In 1906, Gawroński defended his doctoral thesis, Sprachliche Untersuchungen über das Mr.cchakat.ika und das Daśakumāracarita, at the University of Leipzig and became assistant professor in the Department of Indo-European Linguistics at the Jagiellonian University. In 1912 he completed his Habilitationschrift Am Rande des Mr.cchakat.ika and was promoted to the rank of associate professor. In the years 1916-1917 he took the chair in the Department of Sanskrit Philology at the Jagiellonian University. From 1917 full professor and Head of the Department of Contrastive Linguistics at the University of Lwów. He gave lectures on the history and language of Sanskrit drama, contrastive grammar of Indo-European languages and Old-Indian philology.

=== Languages ===
Gawroński was one of the greatest Polish polyglots. He certainly knew 60 foreign languages, but his contemporaries, friends and scientists, claimed he knew many more. Once, being persistently pestered to reveal the truth, Gawroński replied: "I can speak and write in 40 languages and understand and read in about 100." This means that he could have known 140 languages (or 100, depending on whether 100 meant another 100 or not), among which there were many African, Asian, European, modern and extinct ones. In the library left after his death there were books in dozens of languages. In the vast majority of them there were his notes in the margins, always in the language the book was written in.

=== Honors ===
Gawroński was a member of the Polish Academy of Arts and Sciences (1921 a member-columnist, 1926 an active member), as well as the Scientific Society in Lwów (1920, an active member), the Society of Friends of Polish Language (1920), Polish Oriental Society (1922 a member and founder, 1922-23 chairman). In 1925 he was decorated with the Order of Poland Restored (Polonia Restituta) (Commander). Also, he initiated the activity of the “Eastern Library” at the Ossolinski National Institute in Lwów and the “Annual of Oriental Studies” and the Institute of Oriental Studies at the University of Lwów.

== Publications ==
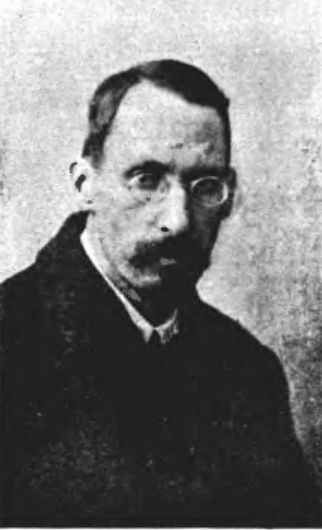
Andrzej Gawroński

Gawroński is the author of numerous publications. Here are some of them:

- in Polish:
  - O błędach językowych (Warszawa 1921)
  - O podstawie psychologicznej zapożyczania wyrazów obcych (Kraków 1921)
  - Szkice językoznawcze (Warszawa 1928)
  - Wartość uczuciowa deminutiwów (Kraków 1928)
  - Początki dramatu indyjskiego a sprawa wpływów greckich (Kraków 1946)
- in other languages:
  - Sprachliche Untersuchungen über das Mṛcchakaṭika und das Daśakumāracarita (Leipzig 1907)
  - Am Rande des Mṛcchakaṭika (ZDMG 65/1911)
  - The Date of Allahabad Stone Pillar Inscription of Samudragupta (Leipzig 1914)
  - Gleanings from Aśvaghoṣa's Buddhacarita (Rocznik Orjentalistyczny 1915)
  - The Digvijaya of Raghu and some Connected Problems (Rocznik Orjentalistyczny 1915)
  - Studies about Sanskrit Buddhist Literature (Kraków 1919)
  - Notes sur les sources de quelques drames indiens (Kraków 1921)
  - Notes on the Sāundarananda. Critical and Explanatory (Kraków 1922)
  - Beginnings of Indian Drama and Problem of Greek Influence (Bhāratī 13/1968)

Gawroński's Polish handbook of Sanskrit (Podręcznik Sanskrytu, Kraków 1932 accessible online, reissued with a list of errata to the first edition: Lublin 1978, 1985; new, improved edition: Warszawa 2004, 2009) has remained the fundamental academic textbook of Sanskrit in Poland.

== See also ==
- List of Poles

== Sources and references ==
- Andrzej Gawroński (językoznawca) - Wikipedia, wolna encyklopedia at pl.wikipedia.org
- Polski Słownik Biograficzny, vol. VII, Kraków 1948-1958
- Biogramy uczonych polskich, Część I: Nauki społeczne, zeszyt 1: A-J, Wrocław 1983 (Short biographies of Polish scientists Part I, fasc. 1 - in Polish)
- Powszechna Encyklopedia Filozofii, t. 3, Lublin 2002, p. 721-722 (Universal Encyclopedia of Philosophy - in Polish).
- Kozarynowa, Zofia: Andrzej Gawroński (wspomnienia), in: Znak 34 1982: 579-604 (extensive memoires by his sister - in Polish)
- Fedirko, Janusz: Fenomenalny multilingwista. Professor Andrzej Gawroński (1885–1927), in: Alma Mater nr 2 (100) 2008, online (A superb multilinguist. Professor Andrzej Gawroński - in Polish)
