= Přemysl =

Czech masculine given name

Přemysl (Czech pronunciation: [ˈpr̝̊ɛmɪsl̩]) is a Czech masculine given name. It is derived from the prefix pre ('over', 'again', 'very') and the Slavic element myslĭ ('thought', 'idea'). The meaning can be interpreted as "man who thinks thoroughly" or "man with a good mind". Polish forms of the name are Przemysł and Przemysław.

Notable people with the name include:

== Royalty and nobility ==
- Ottokar I of Bohemia (Czech: Přemysl Otakar I.; c. 1155–1230), King of Bohemia
- Ottokar II of Bohemia (Czech: Přemysl Otakar II.; c. 1233–1278), King of Bohemia
- Přemek I, Duke of Opava (Czech: Přemysl I. Opavský; c. 1365–1433)
- Przemko II, Duke of Opava (Czech: Přemysl II. Opavský; c. 1423/25–1478)
- Przemko III, Duke of Opava (Czech: Přemysl II. Opavský; c. 1450–1493)

== Other ==
- Přemysl Bičovský (born 1950), Czech football player and manager
- Přemysl Charvát (1930–2005), Czech conductor
- Přemysl Hainý (1925–1993), Czech ice hockey player
- Přemysl Kočí (1917–2003), Czech opera singer and theatre manager
- Přemysl Kovář (born 1985), Czech footballer
- Přemysl Krbec (1940–2021), Czech gymnast
- Přemysl Kubala (born 1973), Czech volleyball player
- Přemysl Pitter (1895–1976), Czech humanist and Protestant preacher
- Přemysl Pražský (1893–1964), Czech actor
- Přemysl Sobotka (born 1944), Czech politician
- Přemysl Švarc (born 1985), Czech triathlete
- Přemysl Vlk (1982–2003), Czech slalom canoeist
- Přemysl Vojta (born 1983), Czech horn player

== Fictional ==
- Přemysl the Ploughman, mythical founder of the Bohemian royal dynasty of Přemyslids

== See also ==
- Przemyśl, a city in Poland
- Slavic names
