= Lament of the Holy Cross =

Medieval Polish planctus

Lament of the Holy Cross (Polish: Lament świętokrzyski) is a medieval Polish planctus, written by an unknown author probably in late 15th century. It now is regarded as one of lyrical masterpieces of the era. Literary historians emphasize the fact that the Lament presents Mary almost as a human being, with feelings and emotions. Most likely, the text used to be part of the Good Friday mysterium.

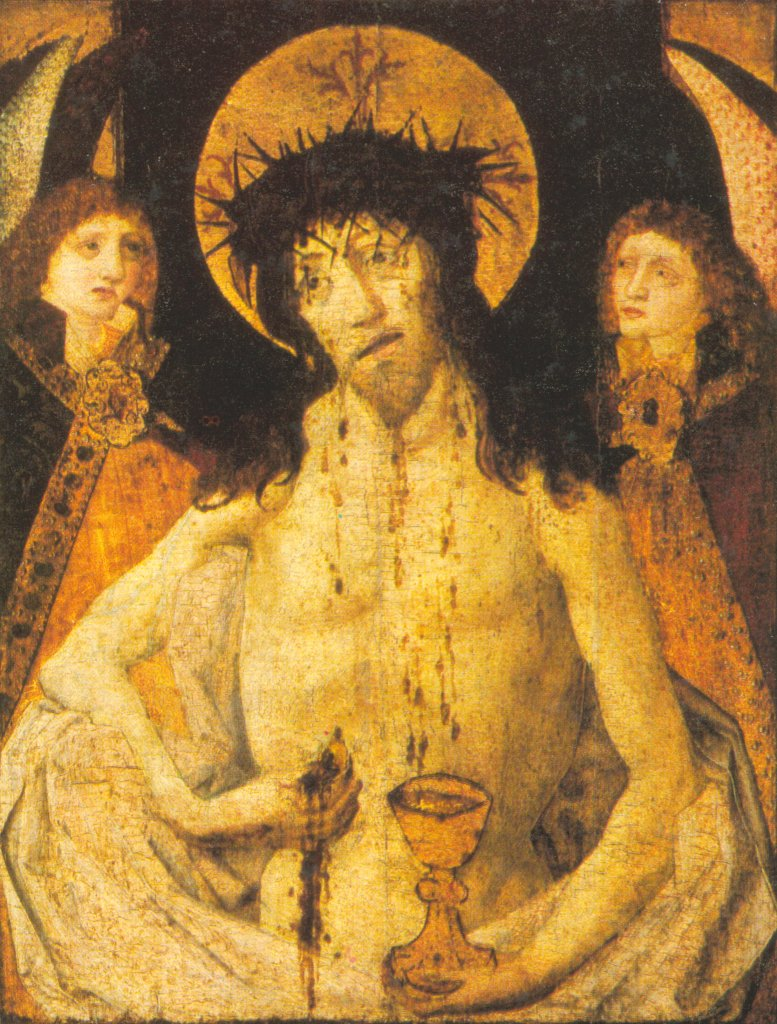
Lament of the Holy Cross

Lament of the Holy Cross is the monologue of Mary, who is painful and mourns her son Jesus Christ, standing under his cross. At first, she calls on people standing around her, urging them to show compassion and understanding. She then turns to her son, hoping to ease his sufferings and get closer to him. Later Mary gets angry and rebellious, and the text is completed with an appeal to all mothers to pray to God for their sons.

The Lament comes from the Benedictine Monastery at Łysa Góra in the Świętokrzyskie Mountains, and was probably written in ca. 1470.

== See also ==
- Old Polish language

== Sources ==
- Poezja polska XIV - XV wieku. W: Tadeusz Witczak: Literatura Średniowiecza. Warszawa: Polskie Wydawnictwo Naukowe, 2002
