= Polish Linguistic Society =

Polish Linguistic Society Polskie Towarzystwo Językoznawcze
- Abbreviation: PTJ
- Formation: 1925; 101 years ago
- Region served: Kraków
- Chairman: Piotr Stalmaszczyk
- Publication: Journal of West African Languages
- Website: ptj.civ.pl/pl

The Polish Linguistic Society (Polskie Towarzystwo Językoznawcze; abbreviated PTJ) is an academic scholarly society formed in Kraków in 1925 to promote the development of linguistics, maintain contact among its members at for the interchange of knowledge with linguistic associations abroad.

It was founded by Andrzej Gawroński at Lviv University, Jan Baudouin de Courtenay at the University of Warsaw, and Zenon Klemensiewicz and Jan Rozwadowsky (who was elected the first chairman of the Society) at Jagiellonian University, among others. Since 1927, the society has published the annual Bulletin of the Polish Linguistic Society (Biuletyn Polskiego Towarzystwa Językoznawczego).
