= Tadeusz Lewicki =

Polish Oriontalist

- Born: 29 January 1906; Lviv
- Died: 22 November 1992 (aged 86); Kraków

Tadeusz Lewicki (1906-1992) was a Polish Arabist, Islamicist, historian, and numismatist. He is known for his works on the Ibadi community.

== Early life ==
Tadeusz Lewicki was born on 29 January 1906 in Lviv (Polish: Lwów) in modern-day Ukraine, a city that, at the time, was part of the Kingdom of Poland and later the Second Polish Republic.

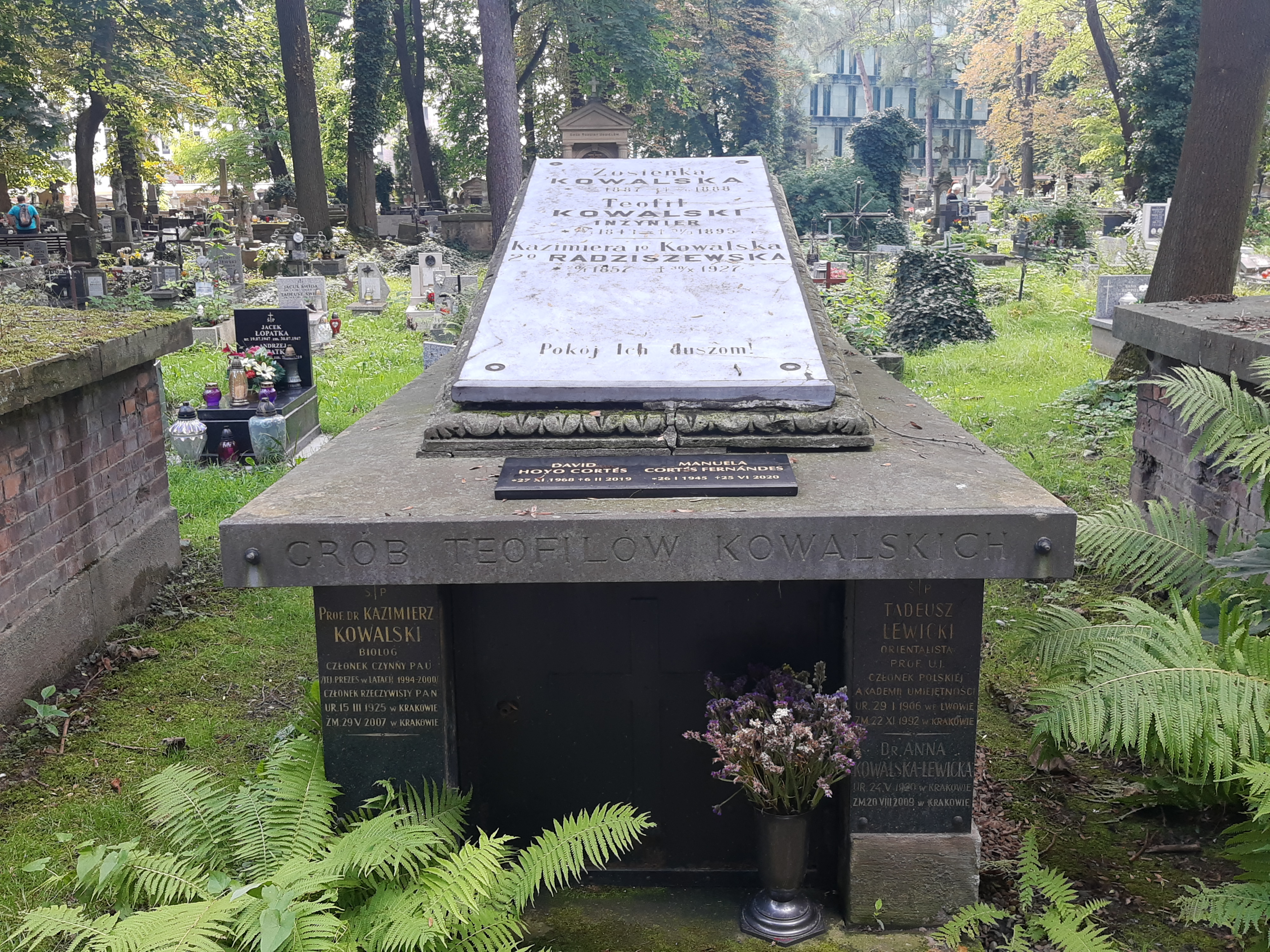
Grave of Tadeusz Lewicki at Rakowicki Cemetery in Kraków,Poland

Tadeusz Lewicki died in Kraków on 22 November 1992, He was buried at the Rakowicki cemetery in Kraków.

== See also ==
- Ibadi studies
- Polish Oriental Society
