= Master Polikarp's Dialog with Death =

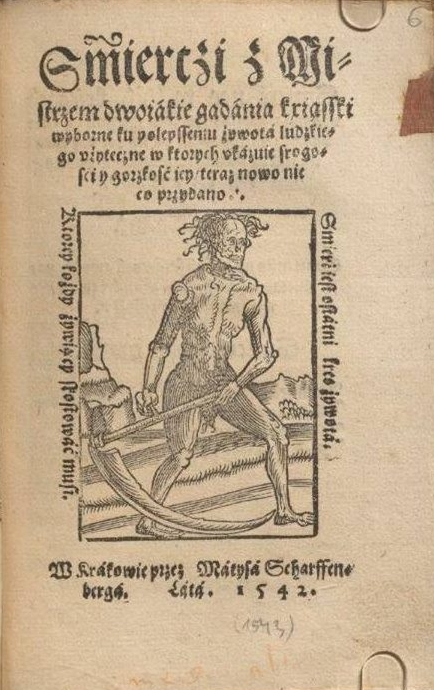
Title page of Śmierci z Mistrzem dwojakie gadania... (contains Master Polikarp's Dialog with Death), Maciej Scharffenberg edition, c. 1542

Master Polikarp's Dialog with Death (Polish: Rozmowa Mistrza Polikarpa ze Śmiercią, Latin: De morte prologus, Dialogus inter Mortem et Magistrum Polikarpum) is a late medieval dialog in verse, written probably in the early 15th century. Master Polikarp's Dialog with Death is now regarded as one of the most important examples of medieval poetry in the Polish language.

Its author is unknown, but after discovering the complete, printed version from 1542, some historians speculate that Mikołaj Rej rewrote the original text for print.

One of the unique features of the work is its use of humour. The dialog mocks monks and priests, inn-keepers, fat women, dishonest physicians and unjust judges. The work is patterned after the 12th century Latin poem Dialogus mortis cum homine, and other such Latin-language publications popular in medieval Europe.

== Versions ==
The original version of the dialogue has been lost; what remains is an incomplete copy from c. 1463–1465, belonging to Mikołaj of Mirzyniec (Mikołaj z Mirzyńca). The ending of the work was known due to its 16th century Russian translation. It has 498 lines, and presents the everyday life of members of different social classes in 15th century Poland.

A formerly unknown printed edition of Rozmowa Mistrza Polikarpa ze Śmiercią (Master Polikarp’s Dialogue with Death) from 1542 (Cracow, Maciej Scharffenberg) has been discovered in one of the European university libraries. The discovery was made by Professor Wiesław Wydra from the Institute of Polish Philology at Adam Mickiewicz University in Poznań. In the contrast to the previously known version of the dialogue from the Płock manuscript, this text has been preserved in its entirety.

This discovery, with a complete Polish text of 918 verses, was the most important event in Polish language and literature scholarship for several decades. The critical edition of the discovered text has been published by prof. Wiesław Wydra and became available on 7 November 2018.

Latest research revealed that the printed version from 1542, is actually an extended version making the dialog more dramatic and theatrical. They also reviewed once more the Old Russian translation within its historic context.

== Characters ==
- Master Polikarp – a well-educated person
- Death – pale, skinny, bald, yellowish, without nose and lips, showing its ribs, naked, a rotten kind of a woman; it holds a scythe in its hands, and its appearance reminds the reader that life is short, and that after death, human bodies decay

== See also ==
- Old Polish
- Danse Macabre
- Death (personification)
- Morana (goddess)
- Santa Muerte
