= Przemyśl (disambiguation) =

Przemyśl is a city in southeastern Poland.

Przemyśl or Przemysł may also refer to:

- Przemysł (name), a Polish given name
- Przemyśl Voivodeship, a Polish province from 1975 to 1998
- Przemyśl, Greater Poland Voivodeship (west-central Poland)
- Przemyśl County, Subcarpathian Voivodeship south-eastern Poland
- Przemyśl Land, administrative unit of Kyivan Rus, Kingdom of Poland and Polish–Lithuanian Commonwealth
- Siege of Przemyśl, an important battle of the First World War

== See also ==
- Przemysław (disambiguation)
