= BNP Paribas Bank Polska =

Polish bank

BNP Paribas Bank Polska SA
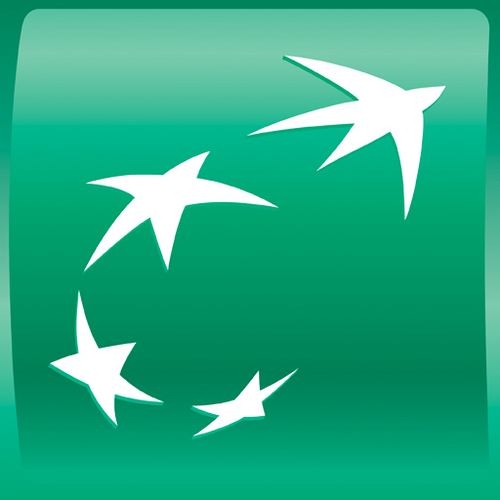

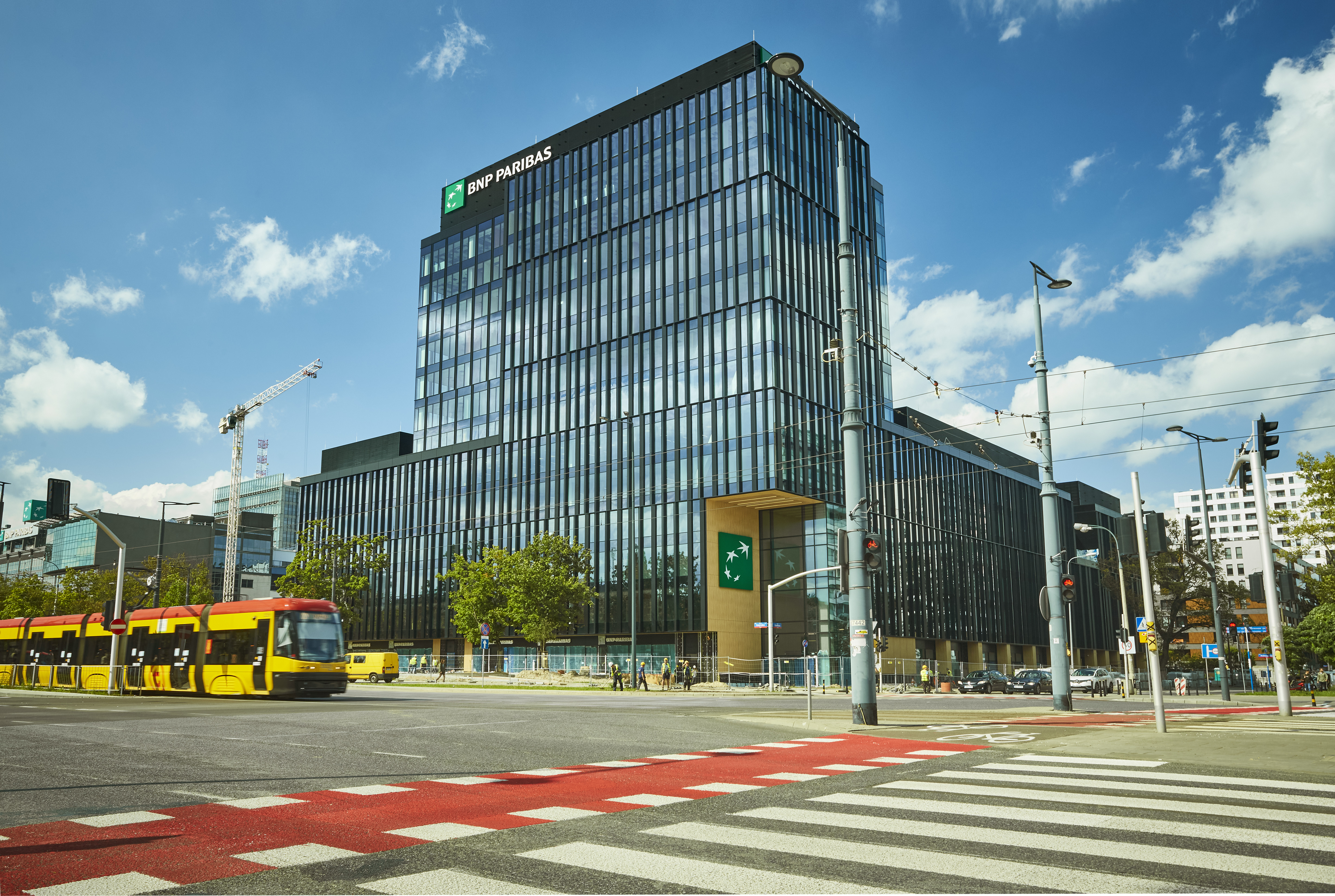
- BNP Paribas in RSS ee
- Company type: Spółka Akcyjna
- Industry: Finance and Insurance
- Founded: 2011; 15 years ago
- Headquarters: Warsaw, Poland
- Key people: Przemysław Gdański CEO
- Products: Financial services
- Parent: BNP Paribas
- Website: www.bnpparibas.pl

BNP Paribas Bank Polska is a Polish bank, majority-owned by Paris-based BNP Paribas. It originates in a joint venture established jointly in 1994 by Banque Nationale de Paris (BNP) and Dresdner Bank, of which BNP Paribas acquired the entire ownership in 2000. It took a much larger dimension with the acquisition by BNP Paribas of BGZ Bank in 2015.

== Overview ==
The legal merger of Bank Gospodarki Żywnościowej (BGZ Bank) and the pre-existing BNP Paribas Bank Polska took place on April 30, 2015 by transferring all the assets of BNP Paribas Bank Polska S.A. to Bank BGŻ S.A. After the merger, the bank operated under the name of Bank BGŻ BNP Paribas S.A.

In 2019, the BGŻ brand was finally phased out and replaced with BNP Paribas Bank Polska.

In 2023 the bank was fined for restricting applications for the credit holidays, a program allowing Polish loan holders to postpone payment installments to help them with the rising cost of living, to a maximum of two months instead of the required eight.

As of April 2025, BNP Paribas held an 81 percent stake in BNP Paribas Bank Polska, directly and indirectly through its Belgian subsidiary BNP Paribas Fortis.

In July 2025, the European Bank for Reconstruction and Development reduced its shareholding in BNP Paribas Bank Polska by selling 2.345 million shares through an accelerated bookbuild on the Warsaw Stock Exchange. After the transaction, the EBRD continued to hold a 2.9% stake and noted that the sale aimed to broaden the bank's market liquidity while preserving its long-term involvement.

== Presidents ==
- Tomasz Bogus (2015–2017)
- Przemysław Gdański (since 2017)

== See also ==
- List of banks in Poland
