= Przemysław (disambiguation) =

Przemysław is a Polish given name.

Przemysław may also refer to:

- Przemysław, Lubusz Voivodeship, village in west Poland
- Przemysław, Pomeranian Voivodeship, village in north Poland
- Przemysław, West Pomeranian Voivodeship, village in north-west Poland

== See also ==
- Przemyśl (disambiguation)
