= Przemysław Turek =

Przemysław Wacław Turek
- Born: 1960 (age 64–65)
- Occupation(s): Polish Orientalist, Arabist, Linguist, Associate Professor at Jagiellonian University

Przemysław Wacław Turek (born 1960) is a Polish orientalist of the Institute of Middle and Far Eastern Studies , Jagiellonian University), and a head of the Department of Israel and the Levant .

== Membership in Organizations and Societies ==
- Polish Oriental Society.
- American Oriental Society since 2014.
- International Association of Maltese Linguistics since 2014.
- European Association of Israel Studies since 2017.
- Royal Asiatic Society since 2017.
- European Association of Biblical Studies since 2018.

== Books ==
- Słownik zapożyczeń pochodzenia arabskiego w polszczyźnie (Dictionary of Loanwords of Arabic Origin in Polish), Universitas, Kraków 2001 [562 pp.]
- Od Gilgamesza do kasydy. Poezja semicka w oryginale i w przekładzie (From Gilgamesh to Qasida: Semitic Poetry in Original Version and in Translation), Księgarnia Akademicka, Kraków 2010 [471 pp.]
- "Programy nauczania języka polskiego jako obcego. Poziomy A1 – C2". Praca zbiorowa pod redakcją Iwony Janowskiej, Ewy Lipińskiej, Agnieszki Rabiej, Anny Seretny, Przemysława Turka, Biblioteka „LingVariów”. Seria: Podręczniki. T. 1, Księgarnia Akademicka, Kraków 2011
- "Orientalia w “Zbiorze potrzebniejszych wiadomości porządkiem alfabetu ułożonych” Ignacego Krasickiego". Opracował zespół pod redakcją Pawła Siwca [Renata Czekalska, Julia Krajcarz, Anna Krasnowolska, Agnieszka Kuczkiewicz-Fraś, Halina Marlewicz, Ewa Siemieniec-Gołaś, Paweł Siwiec, Przemysław Turek], Orientalia Polonica 1, Księgarnia Akademicka, Kraków 2015
- "Literatura Orientu w piśmiennictwie polskim XIX wieku. Część I". Opracował zespół pod redakcją Pawła Siwca [Sylwia Filipowska, Paweł Siwiec, Przemysław Turek], Orientalia Polonica 5, Księgarnia Akademicka, Kraków 2016
- "Maltese. Contemporary Changes and Historical Innovations". Edited by Przemysław Turek and Julia Nintemann, Studia Typologica. Volume 30, De Gruyter Mouton, Berlin - Boston 2022.

== Other publications [in English] ==
- Syriac Song of Pearl as the basis for translations – a critical outline [in:] Języki orientalne w przekładzie – Konferencja, Kraków 20-21 maja 2002, Kraków 2002, pp. 113–122.
- The 30th Ode of Solomon as an oldest example of the great Syriac poetry and the development of Syriac prosody, „Orientalia Christiana Cracoviensia” 2 (2010), 109-120.
- Syriac Heritage of the Saint Thomas Christians: Language and Liturgical Tradition, „Orientalia Christiana Cracoviensia” 3 (2011), 115-130.
- Crucifixion of Jesus – Historical Fact, Christian Faith and Islamic Denial, „Orientalia Christiana Cracoviensia” 3 (2011), 131-156.
- Arab Spring: Its Consequences for Arabic Countries and Its Impact on European Policy, [in:] K. Bojko (red.), Poland-Jordan-European Union: A New Role of Europe in the Middle East after the Arab Spring, Amman: The University of Jordan Press, 2013, pp. 89–102.
