= Przemysław Czerwiński (footballer) =

Polish footballer

Personal information
- Full name: Przemysław Czerwiński
- Date of birth: 26 September 1995 (age 31)
- Place of birth: Chojnice, Poland
- Height: 1.76 m (5 ft 9 in)
- Position: Midfielder

Youth career
- –2009: Kolejarz Chojnice
- 2009–2012: Lechia Gdańsk

Senior career*
Years	Team	Apps	(Gls)
2012–2015	Lechia Gdańsk II	28	(0)
2014–2015	→ Chojniczanka Chojnice (loan)	17	(1)
2015–2018	Chojniczanka Chojnice	14	(1)
2016–2017	→ Gryf Wejherowo (loan)	25	(3)
2018	→ Bałtyk Gdynia (loan)	10	(0)
2018–2019	Bałtyk Gdynia	22	(2)
2019–2020	Kotwica Kołobrzeg	10	(0)
2020–2021	Gryf Wejherowo	23	(5)
2021–2022	KS Mściszewice	7	(5)
2022	Stoczniowiec Gdańsk	1	(0)
Total		157	(17)
- * Club domestic league appearances and goals

Przemysław Czerwiński (born 26 September 1995) is a Polish former professional footballer who played as a midfielder.

== Biography ==
Born in Chojnice, Czerwiński started playing football for local team Kolejarz Chojnice. At the age of 14 he joined the Lechia Gdańsk academy structure, eventually going on to play for the Lechia Gdańsk II team. He played 28 times for the Lechia Gdańsk II team, but failed to break into the first team. While still a Lechia player Czerwiński was loaned out to Chojniczanka Chojnice, the largest team in the town of his birth. After a successful loan spell at the I liga club, he joined Chojniczanka permanently the following summer. However, his return was not as successful with Czerwiński being sent on loans to Gryf Wejherowo and Bałtyk Gdynia during his three year stay in Chojnice. In total Czerwiński made 26 appearances and scored 2 goals for Chojniczanka in the I liga, and made 25 appearances for Gryf and 10 for Bałtyk while out on loan.

After his time in Chojnice, Czerwiński found himself playing in the III liga, the fourth tier of Polish football. It was Bałtyk Gdynia Czerwiński joined after his time with Chojniczanka came to an end, making a further 22 appearances for the club. Czerwiński only spent one season with Bałtyk before permanently joining Kotwica Kołobrzeg the next season, and then returning to play for Gryf Wejherowo the season after.
