= Wojciech Bożek =

Polish diplomat (born 1961)

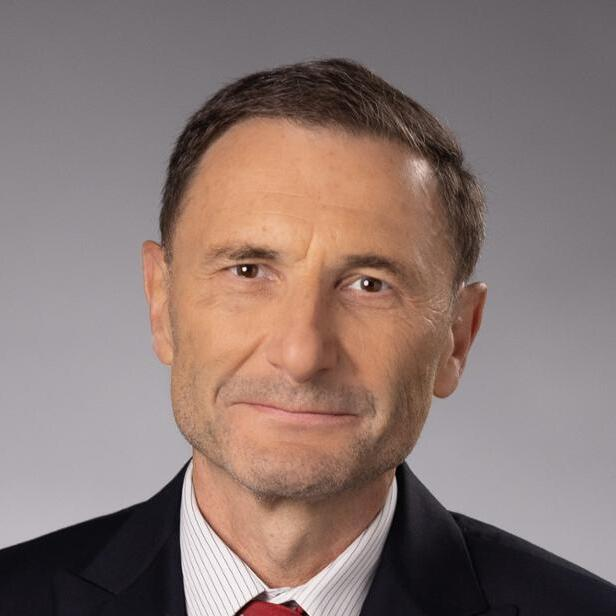

Poland Ambassador to Kuwait
- In office 2001–2005
- Succeeded by: Kazimierz Romański

Poland Ambassador to Libya
- In office 2010–2012
- Preceded by: Józef Osas
- Succeeded by: Piotr Ciećwierz

Poland Ambassador to Lebanon
- In office 2013–2017
- Preceded by: Tomasz Niegodzisz
- Succeeded by: Przemysław Niesiołowski

Personal details
- Born: 1 February 1961 (age 65) Gliwice, Poland
- Children: 1
- Education: Moscow State Institute of International Relations
- Profession: Diplomat

Wojciech Stanisław Bożek (born 1 February 1961, in Gliwice) is a Polish diplomat, specializing in the Middle East region and the countries with a high level of security risk. He served as ambassador to Kuwait (2001–2005), Libya (2010–2012), and Lebanon (2013–2017).

== Life ==
Bożek graduated from the Moscow State Institute of International Relations with degree in Arab countries (1986). He was educated also at the Polish Institute of International Affairs (1987).

In 1986, he started his diplomatic career at the Ministry of Foreign Affairs (MFA). He was assigned to the embassies in Cairo, Egypt and Tripoli, Libya. In April 1991, he opened the Embassy in Abu Dhabi, UAE and until November 1991 was its head. He ended his mission there in 1993. From 1993 to 1996 he served at the Embassy in Damascus, Syria, for two years he was its chargé d'affaires. Following his return to the MFA headquarter in Warsaw, he was head of unit at the MFA Department of Africa and the Middle East responsible for the Maghreb and Mashriq countries.

From 2001 to July 2005, he was ambassador to Kuwait, accredited also to Bahrain. Following his return to Warsaw, until 2007, he was deputy director of the MFA Department of Africa and the Middle East. At that time he was also representing Poland in the Anna Lindh Euro-Mediterranean Foundation for the Dialogue Between Cultures, and the Union for the Mediterranean. From October 2007 to October 2008, he was chargé d'affaires en pied at the Embassy in Dar es Salaam, Tanzania. Between 2010 and 2012, he was ambassador to Libya, accredited also to Niger and Chad. Because of the Libyan civil war, in 2011 Bożek was in charge of evacuating the Embassy for a couple of months to Benghazi. From September 2013 to December 2017, he was ambassador to Lebanon. In the years 2023–2024, he worked in the Office of the Head of the Office for Foreigners. On 1 April 2024, he returned to the MFA Department of Africa and the Middle East. On 7 February 2025, he became chargé d'affaires a.i. of the Embassy in Baghdad, Iraq.

In 2011, he was awarded by the Minister of Foreign Affairs of Poland with the Bene Merito honorary badge for his contribution in evacuation of Polish and European citizens from Libya.

Besides his native Polish, he speaks English, Arabic, Russian, and has some basic knowledge of French.

He is father to a daughter.
