= Przemysław Gdański =

Polish chess player

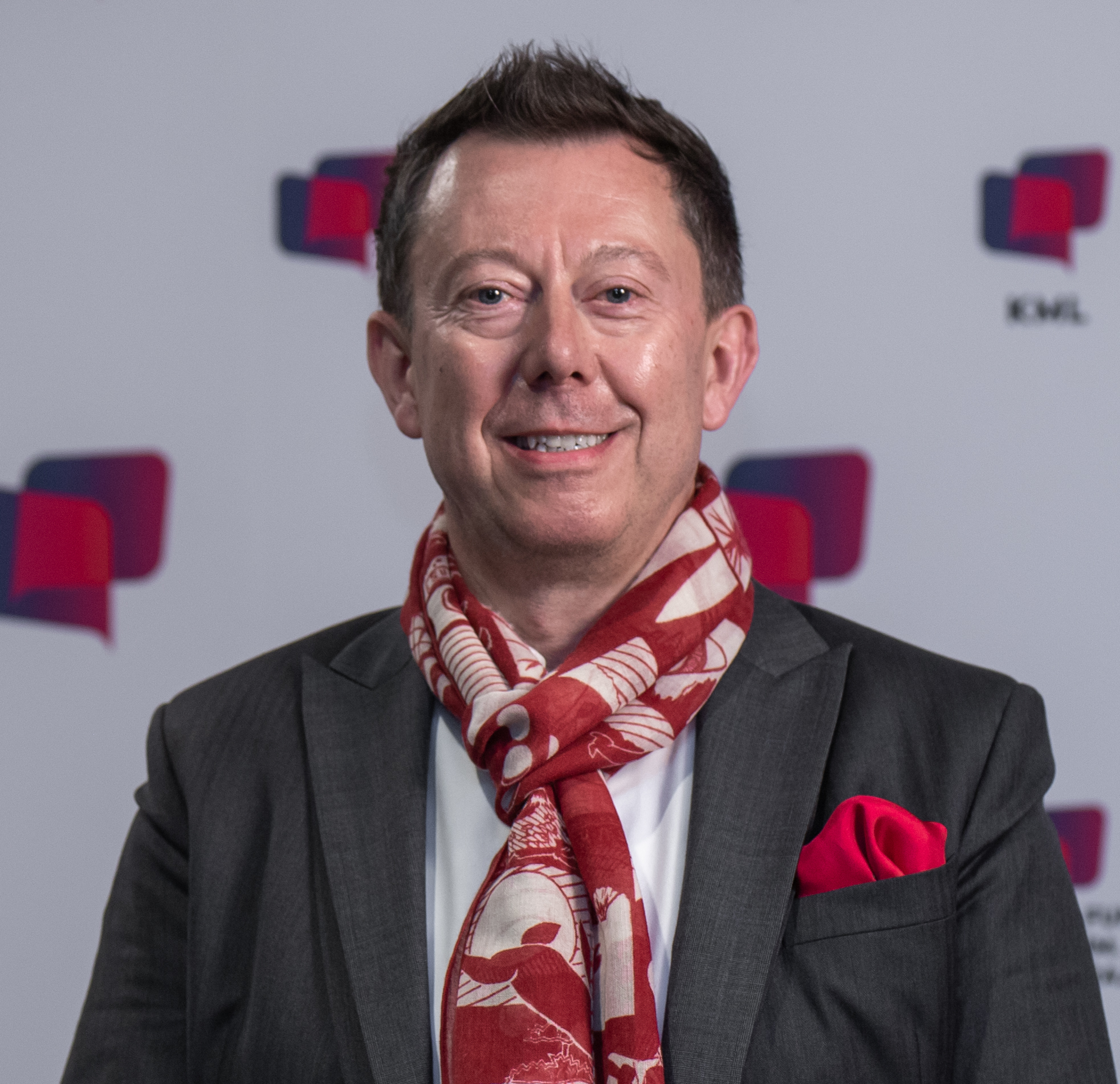
- Przemysław Gdański (2020)
- Born: 5 January 1967 (age 59)
- Education: University of Gdańsk
- Occupation: Banker
- Known for: CEO of BNP Paribas Bank Polska

Przemysław Gdański (born 5 January 1967) is a Polish economist, former chess player and the current CEO of BNP Paribas Bank polska.

== Early life and education ==
Gdański was born on 5 January 1967 and holds a master's degree in economics from the University of Gdańsk. Gdański is the brother of the chess Grandmaster and Olympia participant Jacek Gdański and a former chess player himself, having participated three times in the Polish Team Chess Championship from 1989-1991. He also was named FIDE-Master and had a rating of 2310.

== Career ==
Gdański worked at IBP Bank SA from 1993 to 1995, after which he moved to ABN AMRO. Later, from 2002 to 2006, he served as the managing director of the Large Corporate Department at BPH Bank. From May to November 2006, he was the CEO and general manager of Kalyon Bank Polska. He held the position of vice president at Bank Pekao until 2008, when he became a member of the board of directors at BRE Bank, which would later become mBank, rising to the role of vice president before retiring in October 2017 and taking on the role of CEO and manager of the board at BNP Paribas Bank Polska. In 2021, he became a member of the committee of the UN Global Compact Network's Poland Program. He is also a member of the board of experts of the Faculty of Economics at the University of Gdańsk and was president of the Polish Chess Association for two years.
