= Przemysław Niesiołowski =

Polish politician (born 1974)

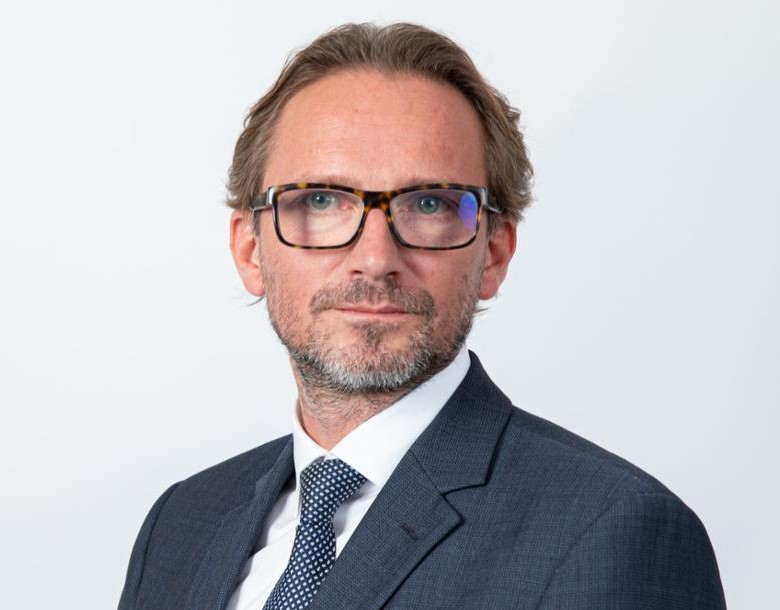

11th Poland Ambassador to Nigeria
- In office 2009–2015
- Preceded by: Grzegorz Waliński
- Succeeded by: Andrzej Dycha

Poland Ambassador to Lebanon
- In office February 2018 – 2024
- Preceded by: Wojciech Bożek
- Succeeded by: Aleksandra Bukowska-McCabe

Personal details
- Born: 1974 (age 51–52)
- Education: University of Warsaw

Przemysław Niesiołowski (born 1974) is a Polish diplomat who served as Poland ambassador to Lebanon (2018–2024) and Nigeria (2009–2015).

== Life ==
Przemysław Niesiołowski was born in 1974. He was educated at the University of Warsaw, Faculty of African Studies. He holds a master's of business administration.

In 1998, Niesiołowski joined the Ministry of Foreign Affairs. Next year he became a member of OSCE mission in Kosovo, later he was the head of the UNDP office in Kosovo. From 2001, he worked at the Polish embassy in Lagos, Nigeria as Second and First Secretary. In 2004, after moving the embassy to Nigerian capital, Abuja, he became the Consul General in Lagos. In 2005, he returned to the MFA in Warsaw. Next year he became Counsellor and the deputy head at the embassy in Nairobi.

From 2009 to 2015, Niesiołowski held post of ambassador to Nigeria, accredited to Equatorial Guinea, Sierra Leone and Benin. Between 2015, and 2018 he was in positions of deputy director and director of the Department of Africa and the Middle East. From February 2018 to 2024 he served as Poland ambassador to Lebanon. In January 2025, he became deputy director of the Department of Africa and the Middle East.

Niesiołowski speaks English, French, Swahili and Russian languages.
