= Przemysław Szkatuła =

Polish footballer

Personal information
- Date of birth: 19 November 1992 (age 33)
- Place of birth: Wodzisław Śląski, Poland
- Height: 1.76 m (5 ft 9 in)
- Position: Midfielder

Team information
- Current team: Naprzód Syrynia
- Number: 8

Youth career
- 2009–2010: Odra Wodzisław Śląski
- 2010: Gosław-WAP Wodzisław Śląski

Senior career*
Years	Team	Apps	(Gls)
2011	Przyszłość Rogów		
2012–2013	Polonia Bytom	43	(3)
2013–2015	Rozwój Katowice	46	(3)
2015–2016	Karpaty Krosno	42	(12)
2017	Polonia Bytom	9	(0)
2017–2018	Motor Lublin	26	(1)
2018	Polonia Bytom	12	(0)
2019–2020	ROW 1964 Rybnik	29	(2)
2020–2021	Pniówek Pawłowice	29	(3)
2021–2022	Ruch Chorzów	22	(3)
2022–2023	Odra Wodzisław Śląski	15	(3)
2023–2024	Pniówek Pawłowice	38	(7)
2024–	Naprzód Syrynia	26	(17)
- * Club domestic league appearances and goals as of 21:26, 20 June 2025 (UTC)

Przemysław Szkatuła (born 19 November 1992) is a Polish professional footballer who plays as a midfielder for regional league club Naprzód Syrynia.

== Career ==
Szkatuła began his career at Odra Wodzisław Śląski. On 17 March 2012, he made his debut in professional football as a part of the Polonia Bytom squad. After 2012–13 season, his contract was terminated by Polish Football Association. On 30 August 2013, Szkatuła signed one-year deal with II liga club Rozwój Katowice. He left Rozwój at the end of the 2014–15 season, having made 46 appearances for the club.

In August 2015, Szkatuła moved to Karpaty Krosno. After one-and-a-half seasons with Karpaty, he joined Polonia Bytom in February 2017, where he played until the end of the 2016–17 season.

On 4 July 2017, Szkatuła signed for III liga club Motor Lublin. On 2 August 2018, he joined IV liga side Polonia Bytom. On 1 February 2019, he signed one-and-a-year contract with ROW 1964 Rybnik

== Honours ==
Pniówek Pawłowice

- Polish Cup (Tychy regionals): 2020–21
