= Przemysł (name) =

Polish masculine given name

- Gender: masculine
- Language: Polish

Origin
- Region of origin: Poland

Other names
- Related names: Przemysław, Přemysl

Przemysł is a Polish masculine given name. Other variants are Przemysław and in Czech, Přemysl. Nicknames and diminutive forms include Přemek or Przemek, Premek, Přemo or Przemo, Přemyslek, Przemko.

== Notable people with the name ==
- Przemysł I of Greater Poland (1221–1257), Duke of Greater Poland
- Przemysł II (1257–1296), Grand Duke and King of Poland, son of Przemysł I
- Przemysł of Inowrocław (1278– 1338/39), regional Duke in Poland

== See also ==
- Przemysław
