= Zenon Klemensiewicz =

Polish linguist

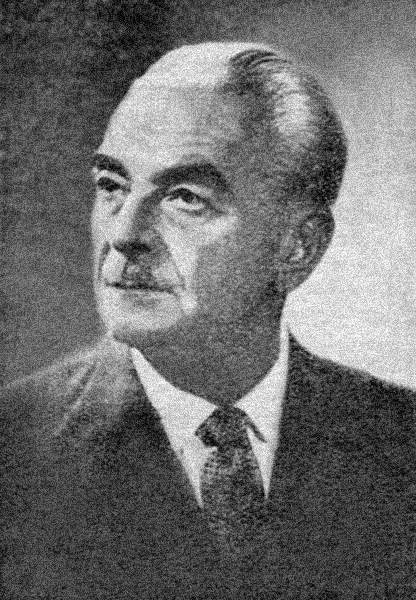

Zenon Klemensiewicz (1891 in Tarnów – 2 April 1969) was a Polish linguist, specialist in the Polish language, professor of the Jagiellonian University. He fought in World War I and World War II, and took part in the underground education in WWII occupied Poland. He was one of the founders of the Polish Linguistic Society.

He died in the crash of the LOT Polish Airlines Flight 165.

== Publikacje ==
- Historia Języka Polskiego, PWN Warszawa 1974 (po śmierci autora)
