= Holy Cross Sermons =

13th or 14th century Polish documents containing the oldest known Polish prose

- National Library of Poland
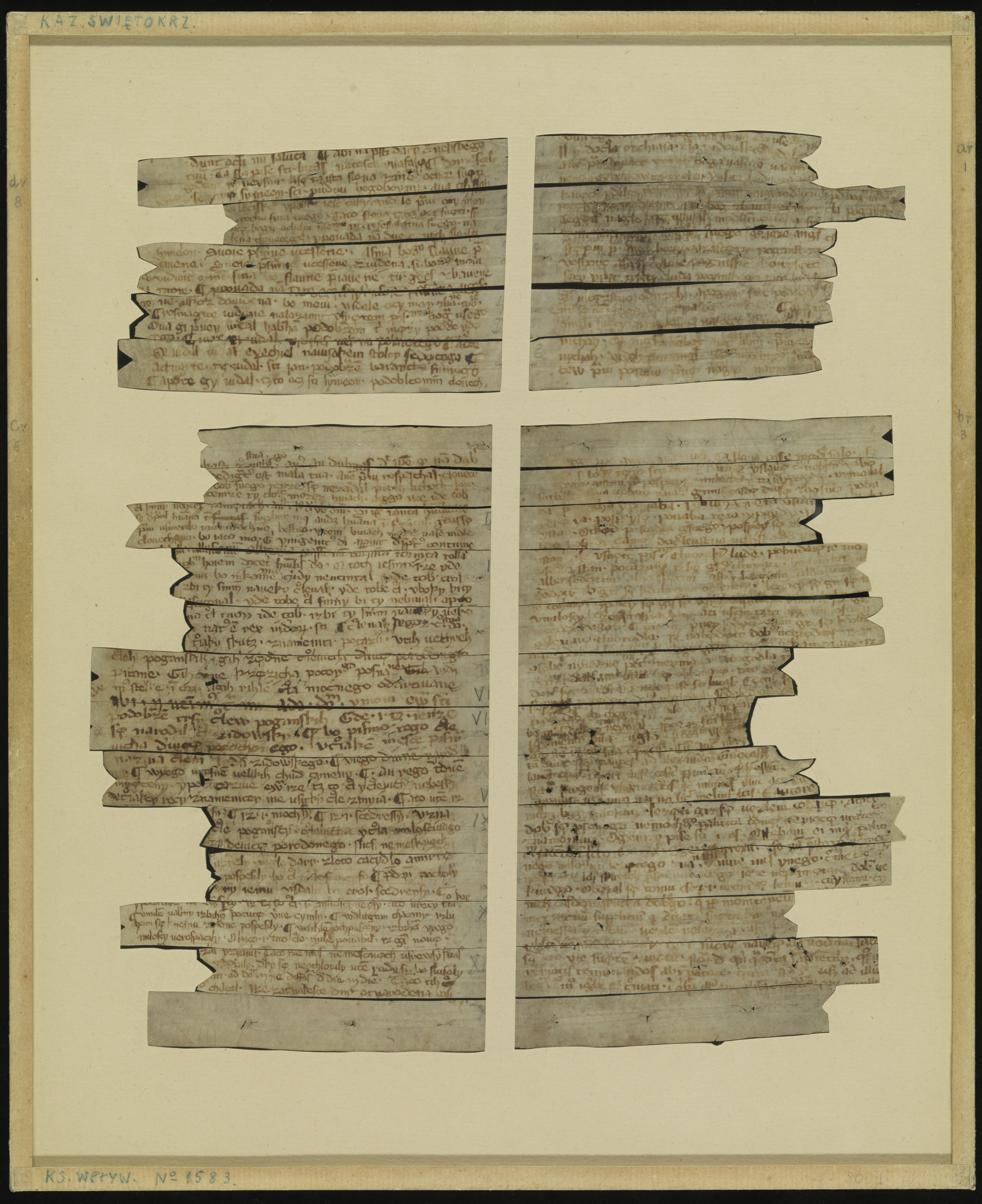
- Also known as: Polish: Kazania świętokrzyskie
- Date: 14th century (manuscript)
- Language(s): Latin, Polish
- Size: 26x22 cm
- Accession: Rps BOZ 1

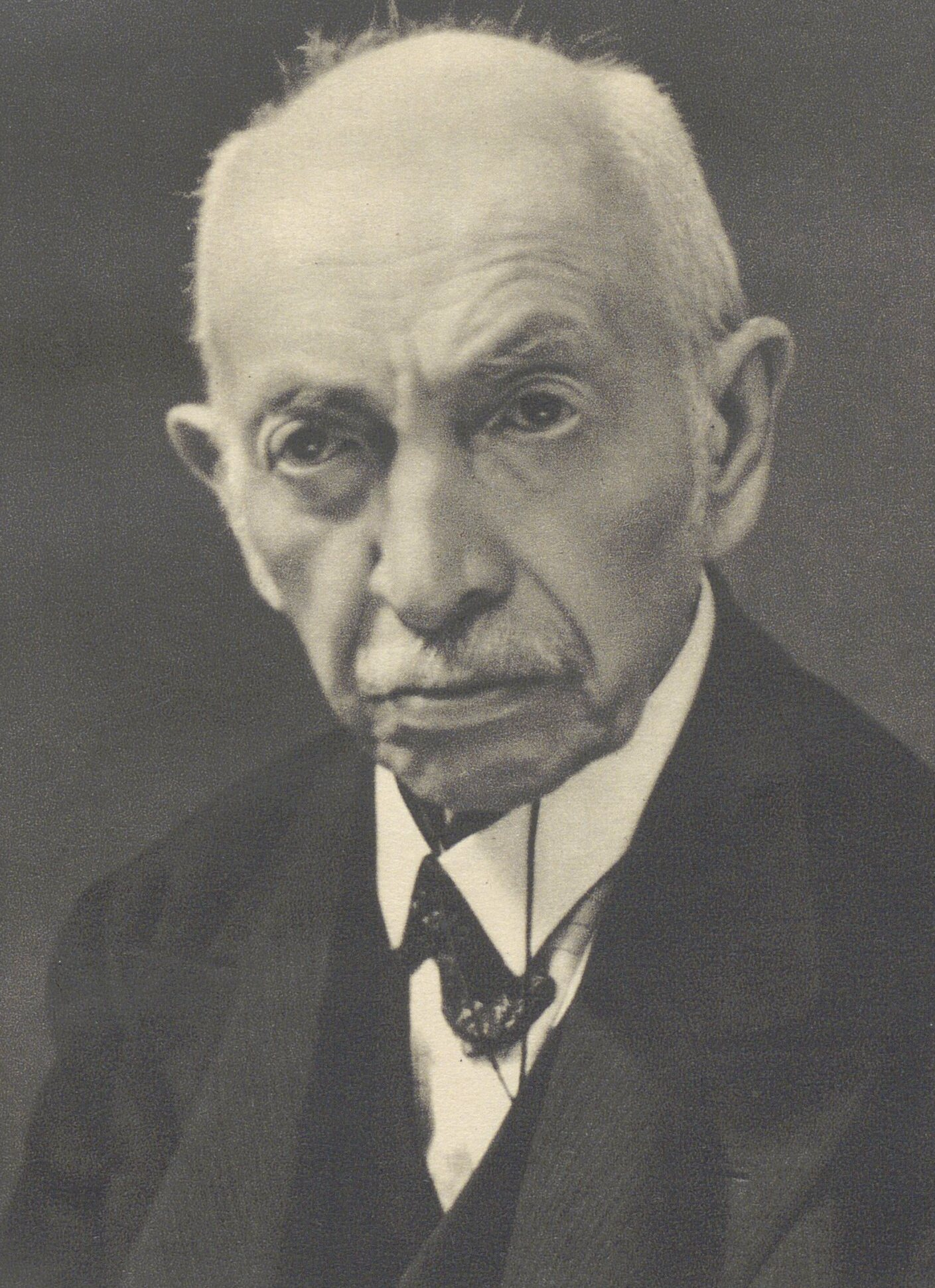
Alexander Brückner – discoverer of sermons

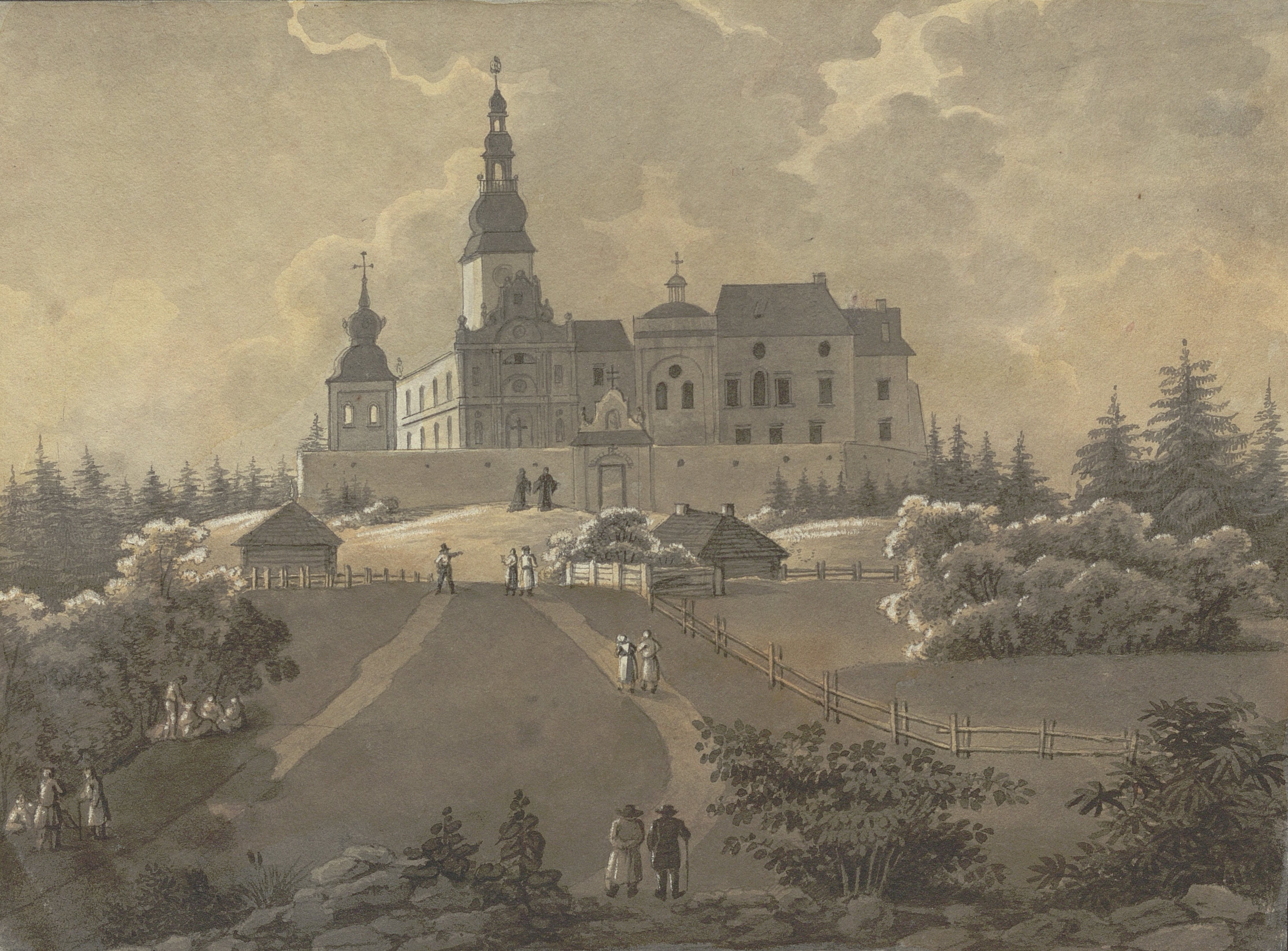
View of the monastery on Łysa Góra, circa 1825–1850

The Holy Cross Sermons (Polish: Kazania świętokrzyskie) are the oldest extant prose text in the Polish language, probably dating from the late 13th century, although the extant manuscripts date to the 14th century. The documents are named after the place where they were originally housed – the Holy Cross Monastery (pl) in Poland's Holy Cross Mountains (Polish: Góry Świętokrzyskie). They were discovered in 1890 by Aleksander Brückner, in the form of parchment pieces cut into reinforcing strips, inside the binding of a Latin language codex, which contained the Acts of the Apostles and the Apocalypse. The sermons were first published in 1891, in a "Philological Works" ("Prace Filologiczne") magazine. In 1934, facsimiles of the text were published by the Polish Academy of Learning, and in 2009, new, full edition of the sermons was issued, prepared by professor Paweł Stępień.

== History ==
Even though Aleksander Brückner claimed that the text was originally housed at the Holy Cross Monastery, this hypothesis has been criticized by some scholars. According to historian Władysław Semkowicz, the codex, already strengthened with strips of parchment, was delivered to a Benedictine monastery at Leżajsk, around 1459.

The Leżajsk monastery, however, was not the location where the sermons were written. Language analysis carried out by Polish experts proved that the text was probably written in a monastery in Miechów, which was famous for its sermons and library, and which cooperated with the Leżajsk monastery. On the other hand, if sermons were written in the 13th century, then their Miechów origins are dubious. At that time, the monks of this monastery were of Czech and German origin, who either did not speak Polish, or spoke it poorly and were unable to write down the complicated text.

Some time in the 15th century, the sermons were cut into strips, which were used to strengthen the binding of a Latin language codex. Most likely, other parts of the sermons were used in bindings of other books. This practice was common at the time, as parchment was both durable and expensive, so publications regarded as unnecessary or unimportant were frequently used to strengthen other, more precious books.

Aleksander Brückner discovered the sermons on March 25, 1890, at the Imperial Public Library in St. Petersburg, Russian Empire. He was studying an ancient Latin codex, which had belonged to the Warsaw University library, and was confiscated by the Russians after the November Uprising (1831). In the binding of the book, Brückner to his surprise found eighteen long strips. After putting them together, it turned out that they contained one whole, and five incomplete sermons.

They were brought back to Poland in 1925. During World War II, the Holy Cross Sermons were taken to Canada for safekeeping. They are now preserved at the National Library in Warsaw (#8001), and their photocopy may be seen at The Digital National Library Polona (See electronic version of the Holy Cross Sermons). From May 2024, the manuscript is presented at a permanent exhibition in the Palace of the Commonwealth.

== Description ==
The sermons, on the occasions of Church holy days, comprise fragments of five texts and one complete sermon (for St. Catherine's Day). Written on parchment, they had been cut into thin strips and used to reinforce the binding of a 15th-century Latin manuscript. The fifteen strips, put together by Bruckner, make one sheet (117 × 173 mm), and the remaining three strips make the bottom of a second sheet.

Linguistically, the Holy Cross Sermons reflect an older stage of the language than the 14th century, the manuscript being a copy of original sermons composed some time from the end of the 13th century. They manifest a variety of linguistic archaisms, for instance:

1) Hard-stem declension of the pronoun *tъnъ 'this one': Nom. sg. ten, Gen. sg. togo, Dat. sg. tomu;

2) Aorist and Imperfect:

- 1 sg. aor. widziech (cf. Lat. perf. vidi) < PSl. *viděti 'to see, to look', *viděxъ 'I saw, I looked (at); I have seen, I have looked (at)';

- 3 sg. aor. postawi (cf. Lat. perf. posuit) < PSl. *postaviti 'to place', *postavi 'he/she/it placed, has placed';

- 3 pl. aor. pośpieszychą się (cf. Lat. perf. venerunt) < PSl. *pospěšiti 'to go, to go somewhere', *pospěšixǫ 'they went, they went somewhere, they went out';

- 3 sg. impf. biesze (cf. Lat. impf. erat) < PSl. *byti 'to be', *běaše 'he/she/it was';

- 3 sg. impf. siedziesze (cf. Lat. impf. sedebat) < PSl. *sěděti 'to sit', *sěděaše 'he/she/it sat, was sitting'.

== Contents ==
The strips contain a whole sermon for St. Catherine's Day (November 25), and parts of sermons for the following days:

- Michaelmas (September 29),
- Saint Nicholas Day (December 6),
- Christmas (December 24),
- Epiphany (called in Poland Three Kings’ Day, January 6),
- Feast of the Purification of the Virgin (February 2).
