= Polish Oriental Society =

Polish Oriental Society a society of Polish orientalists. Founded in 1922. Currently 131 members. Its statutory aims are: to contribute to the development of oriental studies in Poland through research and support of research on peoples of Asia and Africa. President: Marek Mejor.

Address: 00-927 Warszawa, ul. Krakowskie Przedmieście 26/28 (Institute of Oriental Studies of the University of Warsaw)

== See also ==
- Tadeusz Lewicki
