= Przemysław Bobak =

Polish diplomat

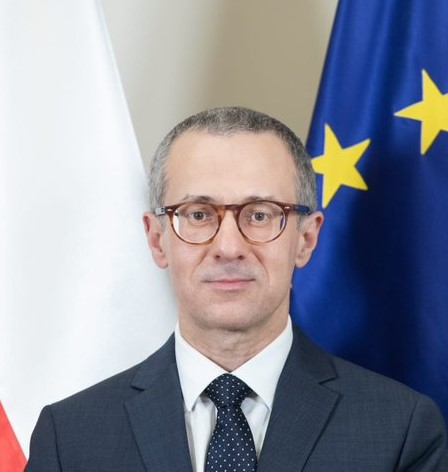

Poland Ambassador to Ethiopia
- In office 6 September 2020 – 2024
- Preceded by: Aleksander Kropiwnicki

European Union Ambassador to Chad
- In office 2024–2025
- Preceded by: Koenraad Cornelis
- Succeeded by: Amador Sánchez Rico

Personal details
- Born: 1974 (age 51–52) Warsaw
- Children: 2
- Education: Warsaw School of Economics
- Profession: Diplomat

Przemysław Jacek Bobak (born 1974) is a Polish diplomat, ambassador of Poland to Ethiopia (2020–2024), ambassador of the European Union to Chad (2024–2025).

== Life ==
Przemysław Bobak finished SGH Warsaw School of Economics. He also studied at the Central European University in Budapest and at the University of Geneva.

In 2001, he started his diplomatic career at the Ministry of Foreign Affairs. Following his internships at the embassy in London, United Kingdom and at the permanent representation to the OECD in Paris, France, he joined the MFA Department of Africa and the Middle East. Between 2004 and 2006, he was working at the embassy in Nairobi, Kenya as Third Secretary responsible for economic and development cooperation in Kenya, Uganda, Rwanda and Burundi, while cooperating with the United Nations Human Settlements Programme (UN-HABITAT) and United Nations Environment Programme (UNEP). From 2006, he was working at the UN-HABITAT office in Warsaw being in charge of Central, East and South European countries. In 2009, he returned to the MFA; firstly, Eastern Department, later, Political Director's Office as a deputy director. Between 2013 and 2017 he was at the embassy in Tel Aviv responsible for scientific, technology and tourist matters. In 2017, he was back in Warsaw. After a couple of months as First Councillor at the Economic Cooperation Department, in February 2018, he became the director of the Department of Africa and the Middle East. On 21 July 2020, he was appointed Poland Ambassador to Ethiopia, additionally accredited to Djibouti, South Sudan and the African Union. He was responsible for relations with the Intergovernmental Authority on Development and United Nations Economic Commission for Africa, as well. He took his post on 6 September 2020, and presented credentials to the president Sahle-Work Zewde on 16 October 2020. He ended his term in 2024. On the same year, he became European Union ambassador to Chad. He finished his term in 2025.

Besides Polish, he speaks English and French.

== Honours ==
- Silver Cross of Merit (2019)
