= The Polish News Bulletin =

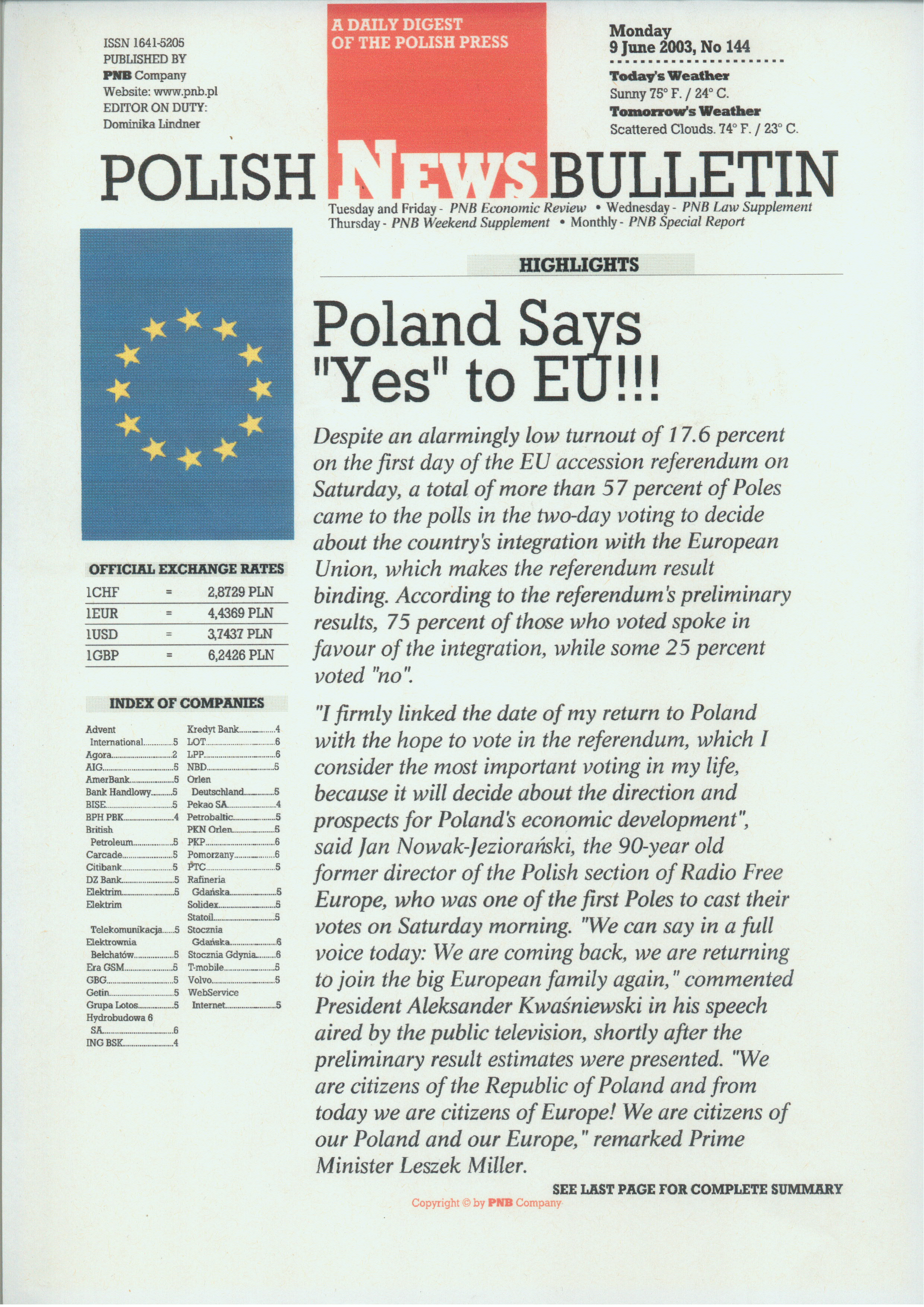
- Front page of a May 2004 issue
- Type: Daily newspaper
- Owner(s): NEWTON Media Group a.s. and The Polish News Bulletin Company Sp. z o.o.
- Editor: Ewa Szczęsna
- Founded: 1947; 79 years ago
- Language: English
- Headquarters: Warsaw, Poland
- ISSN: 1641-5205
- Website: www.pnb.pl

The Polish News Bulletin (PNB) is an English-language publishing house headquartered in Warsaw, the capital of Poland. Its main issues consist of political and economic press digests. PNB publications are used as business intelligence by diplomats and foreign expats living and working in Poland. The Polish News Bulletin Company sp. z o.o. is partially owned by the Czech media monitoring group, NEWTON Media a.s.

== History ==
The Polish News Bulletin was established in 1947. In the first post-war years it worked as a competence centre of two English-speaking embassies headquartered in the Polish capital: Embassy of the United States, Warsaw and Embassy of the United Kingdom, Warsaw. PNB bulletins had been prepared by a team of translators and editors who examined and summarized Polish press releases creating daily digests. After the Revolutions of 1989 and their aftermath, Poland became a free-market economy, allowing PNB to broaden its business model into a publishing house that caters business intelligence to both embassies and international companies entering the Polish market.

CEOs

The following have been CEOs of PNB:

- Andrzej Mietkowski, 1999–2006
- Georg Ranzenbacher, 2006–2011
- Ireneusz Bera, 2011–2013
- Joanna Szczęsna-Iwaszkiewicz, 2013 onwards
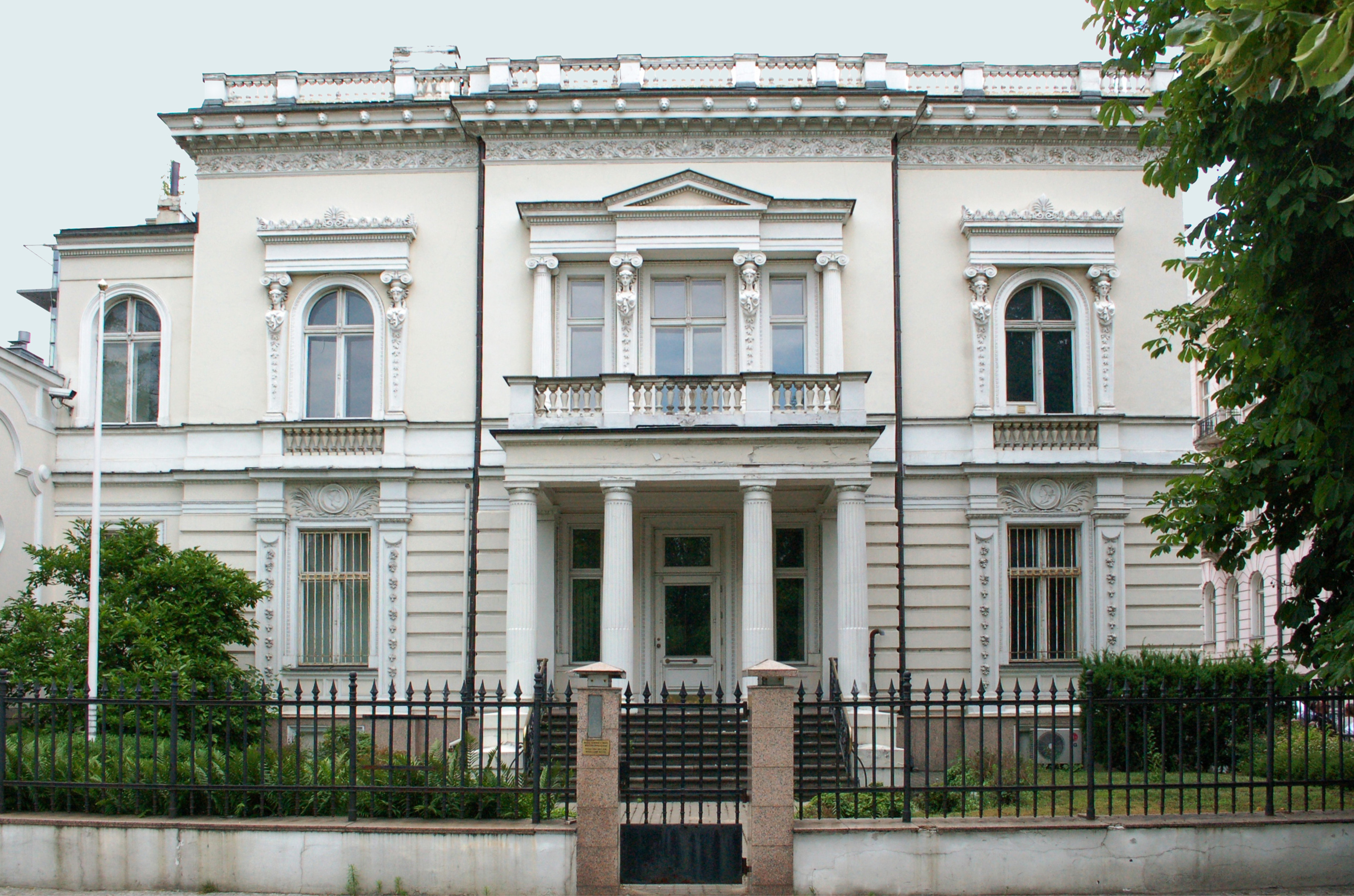
British Embassy, Warsaw (1945–2008)

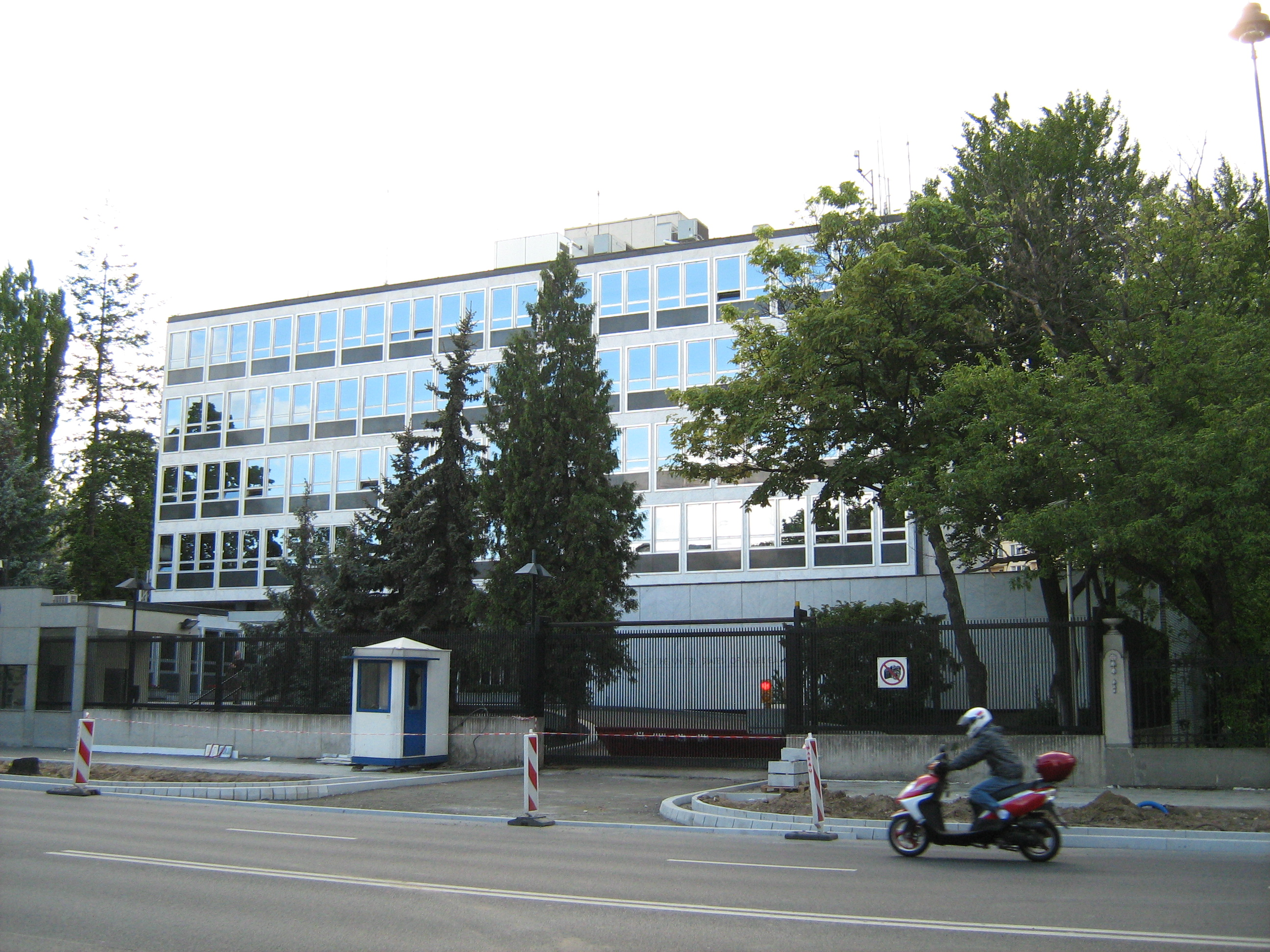
American Embassy, Warsaw (2015)

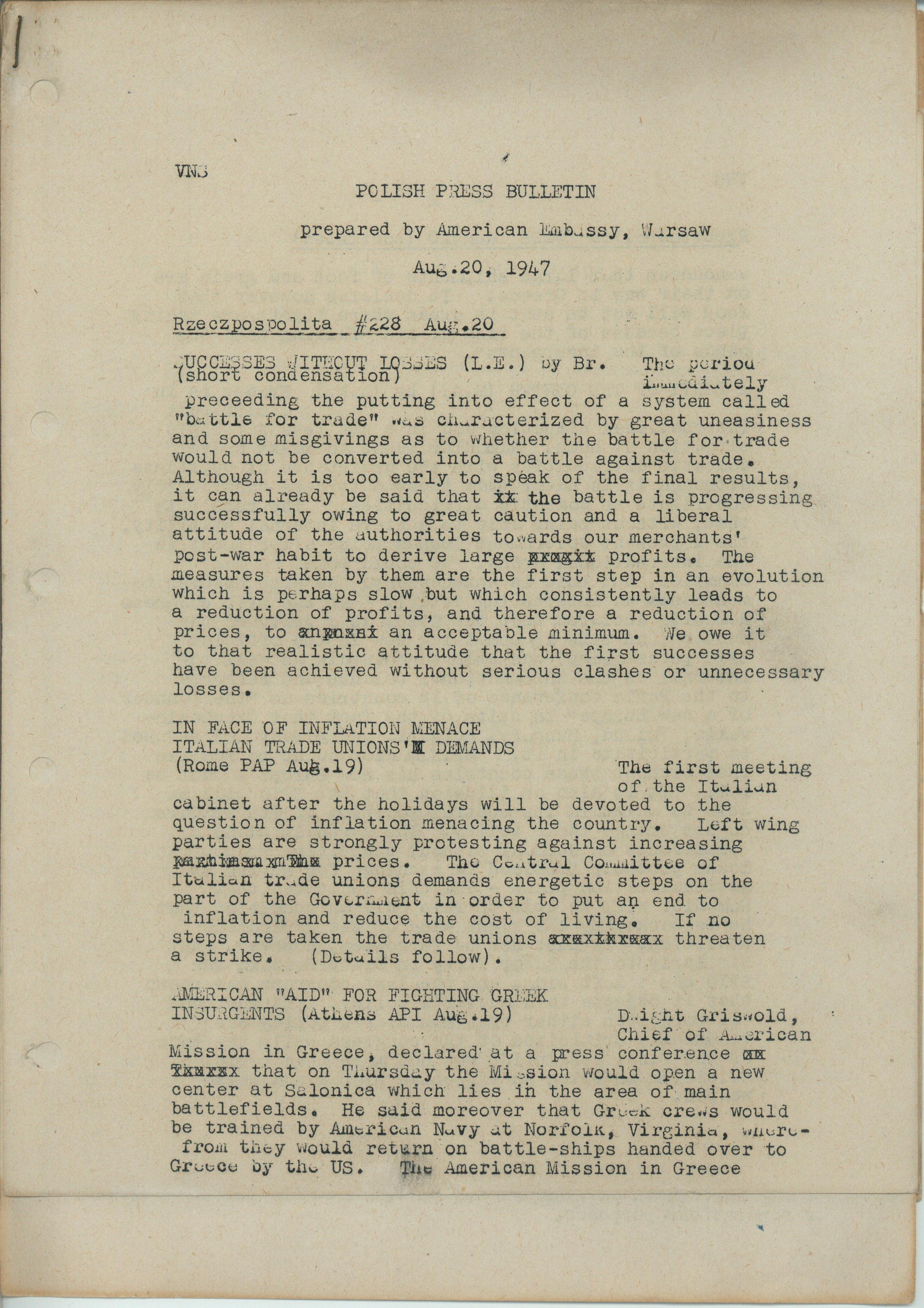
The Polish News Bulletin Daily published by the U.S. Embassy Warsaw (1947)

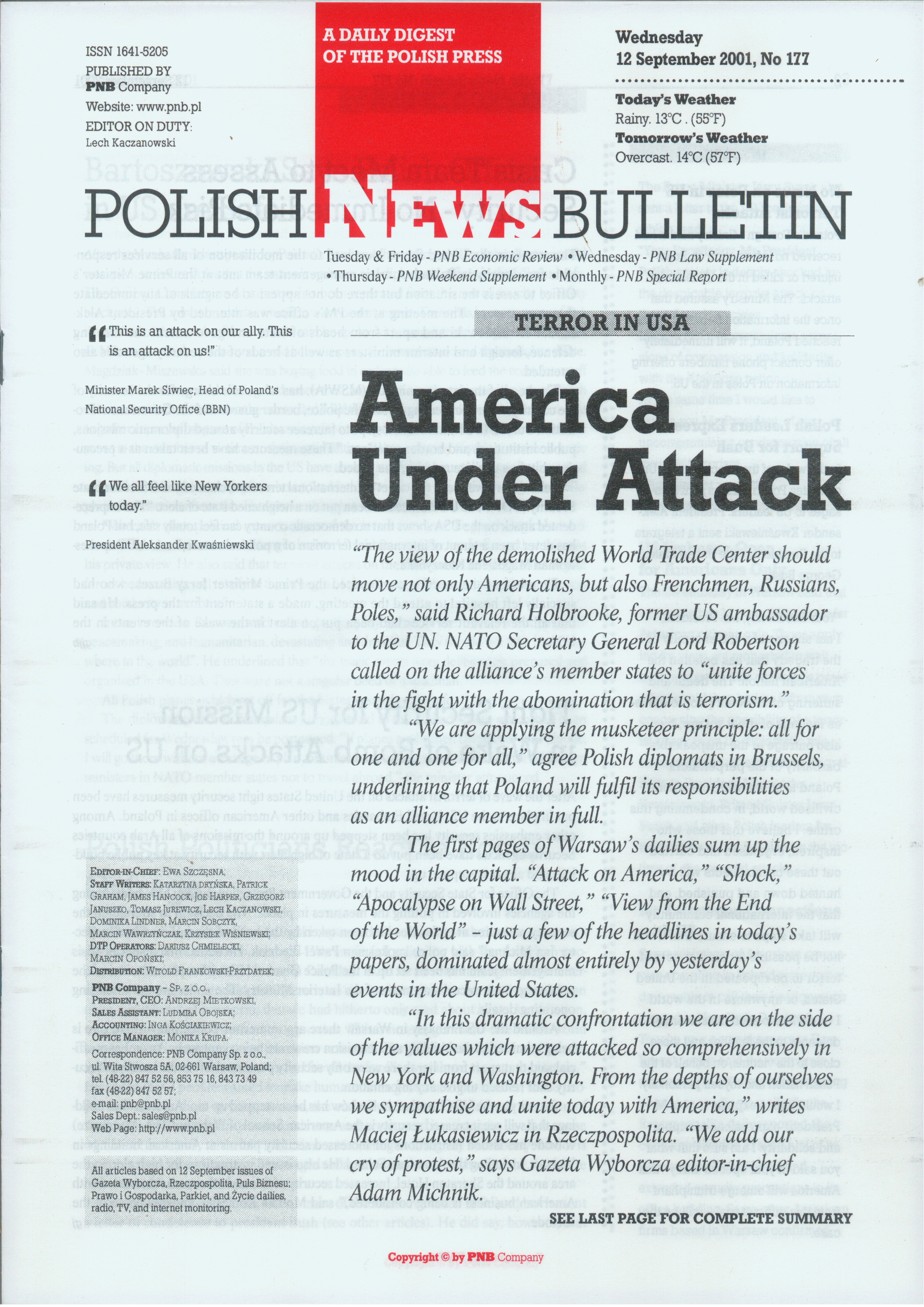
The PNB Daily – front page (2001)

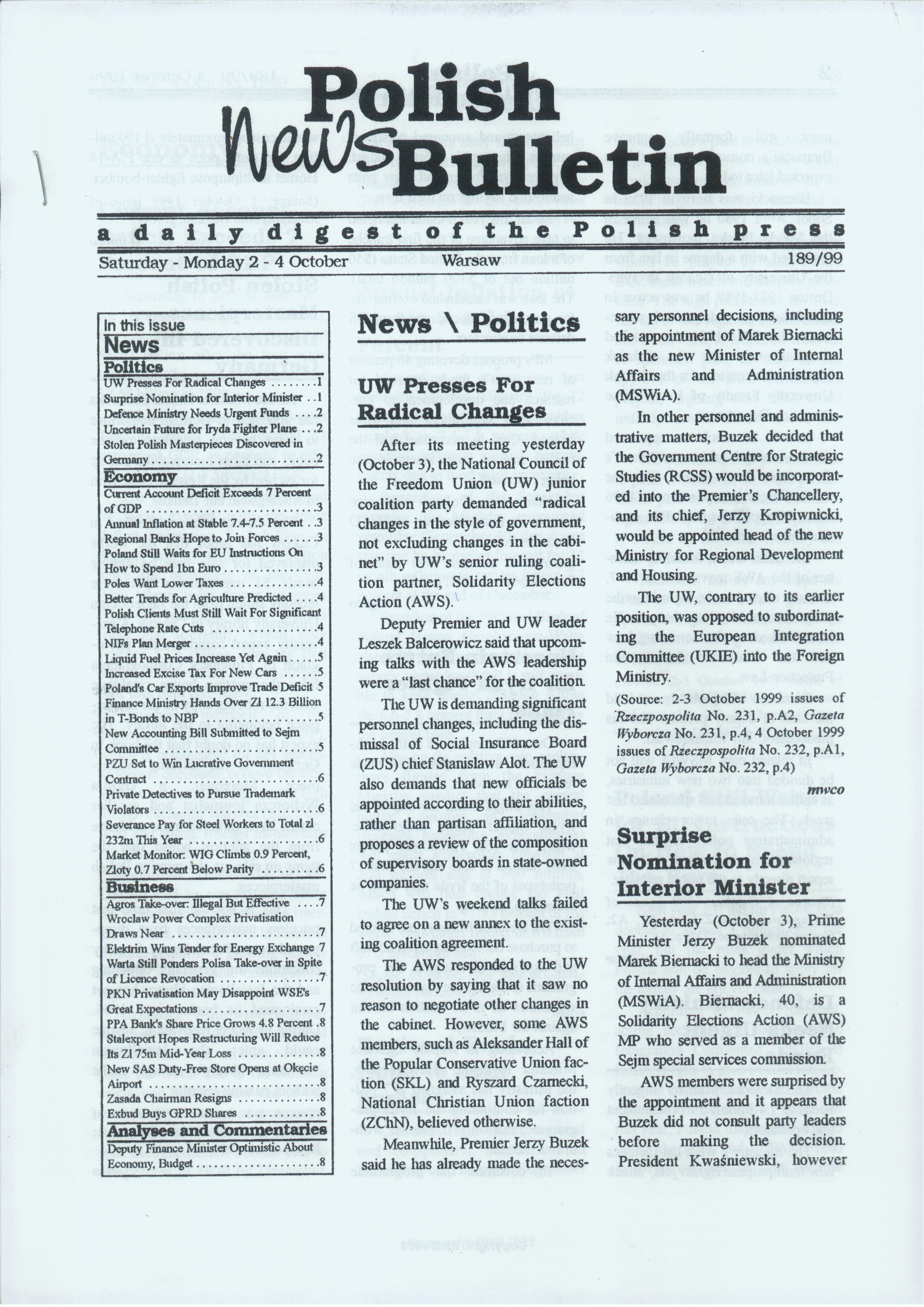
The PNB Daily – front page (1999)

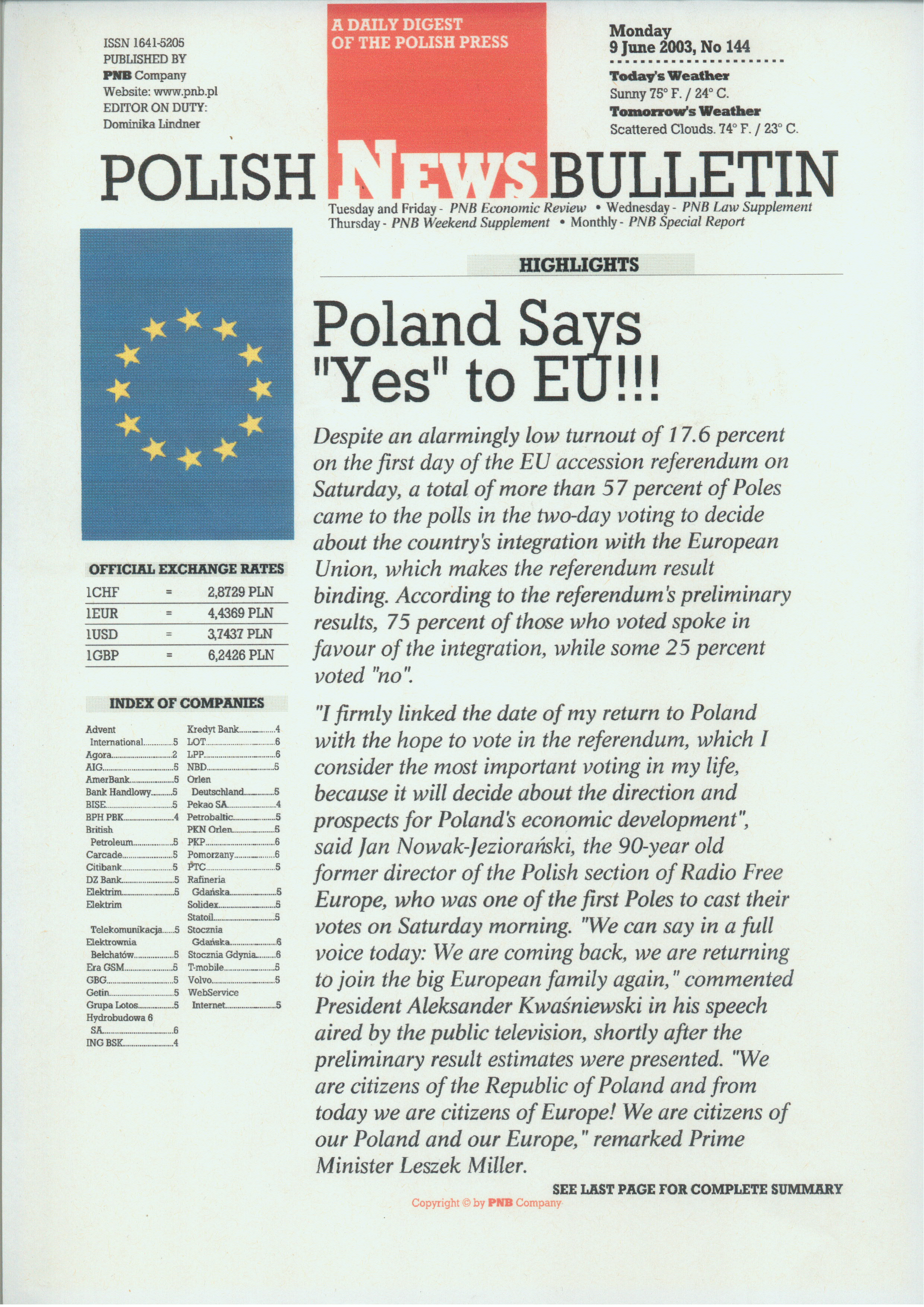
The PNB Daily – front page (2004)

== Publications ==
PNB is involved with the following publications:

- Polish News Bulletin Daily – published since 1947, from the beginning of PNB's existence. Issued daily, from Monday to Friday. Consists of daily press digests and analyses of the current developments from Poland.
- PNB Economic Review – published twice a week, on Tuesdays and Fridays. Focused on economic and business news from Poland and the central European region.
- PNB Law Supplement – published once a week, on Wednesdays. Covers law and administrative changes.
- PNB Weekend Supplement – published once a week, on Thursdays. Includes deep insight analyses and expert opinions on major political developments.
- PNB Special Report – a monthly review of selected sectors of the Polish economy.

== International cooperation ==
During almost seventy years of uninterrupted publishing, The Polish News Bulletin established numerous international partnerships with foreign news agencies and publishing houses. PNB content was, or still is, accessible via platforms such as LexisNexis, Factiva (Dow Jones), EBSCO and Euromoney.
