= List of ambassadors of Poland to Iceland =

Poland Ambassador to Iceland
- Ambasador Rzeczypospolitej Polskiej w Islandii
- Coat of arms of Poland
- Style: Mr. Ambassador (informal); His Excellency (diplomatic)
- Reports to: Polish Ministry of Foreign Affairs
- Seat: Reykjavík, Iceland
- Appointer: President of Poland
- Term length: No fixed term
- Website: Embassy of Poland, Iceland

The Republic of Poland Ambassador to Iceland is the Poland's foremost diplomatic representative in Iceland, and head of the Poland's diplomatic mission in Iceland.

== History ==
Iceland recognised Poland in 1922. However, first diplomatic relations were established in 1946. In 1951, Poland opened Consulate General in Reykjavík, which after the year was elevated to the rank of the embassy. The Embassy was open until 1981, when diplomatic relations between Poland's communist government and Iceland's government deteriorated due to the introduction of Martial law in Poland by communists. From 1981, Poland's Ambassador to Norway was also accredited to Iceland. In 2008, the Polish Government opened Consulate General in Reykjavík which was upgraded to an embassy in 2014.

== List of ambassadors of Poland to Iceland ==
- 2013–2017: Lech Mastalerz (chargé d’affaires)
- 2017–2024: Gerard Pokruszyński
- since 2025: Aleksander Kropiwnicki (chargé d’affaires)

== See also ==
- Iceland–Poland relations
