= Gerard Pokruszyński =

Polish diplomat

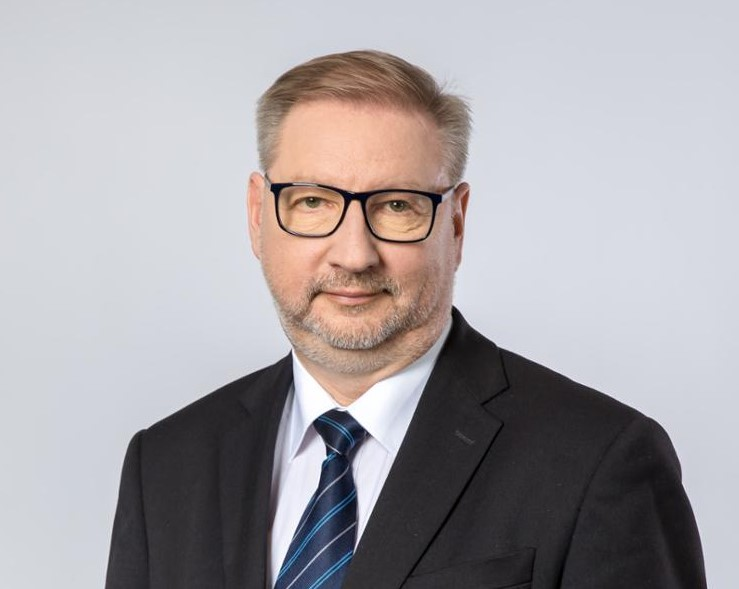

Poland Ambassador to Iceland
- In office December 2017 – July 2024
- Appointed by: Andrzej Duda
- President: Guðni Th. Jóhannesson
- Preceded by: Lech Mastalerz

Personal details
- Born: 1959 (age 66–67) Warsaw
- Spouse: Margherita Bacigalupo
- Education: University of Warsaw
- Profession: Diplomat

Gerard Sławomir Pokruszyński (born 1959 in Warsaw) is a Polish diplomat, from 2017 to 2024 serving as an ambassador to Iceland.

== Life ==
Gerard Pokruszyński holds an M.A. in sociology from the University of Warsaw. He has been studying also at the Lund University and University of Florence. Since 2001, he holds a Ph.D. in defence and strategy from the National Defence University of Warsaw.

He was working as a lecturer at the Warsaw University of Technology, Faculty of Socio-Economic Sciences. In 1991, Pokruszyński joined the Ministry of Foreign Affairs. He was holding post of Consul-General thrice: in Milan (1993–1999), Malmö (2004–2007), and Catania (2007–2009). He was working also as a counselor at the Permanent Representation of the Republic of Poland to the OECD, Paris (2001–2002), and at the embassy in Kyiv as minister-counselor for political affairs.

At the MFA he was director of the Department of Promotion (1999–2000) and director of the Department for Foreign Affairs in the Chancellery of the Prime Minister (2000), the Minister's Secretariat (2015–2017), director of the Eastern Department (2017).

In December 2017, Pokruszyński was appointed Poland ambassador to Iceland. He ended his term in July 2024.

Beside Polish, he speaks English and Italian, Swedish, and Russian. He is married to Margherita Bacigalupo.
