= Poland–United Kingdom relations =

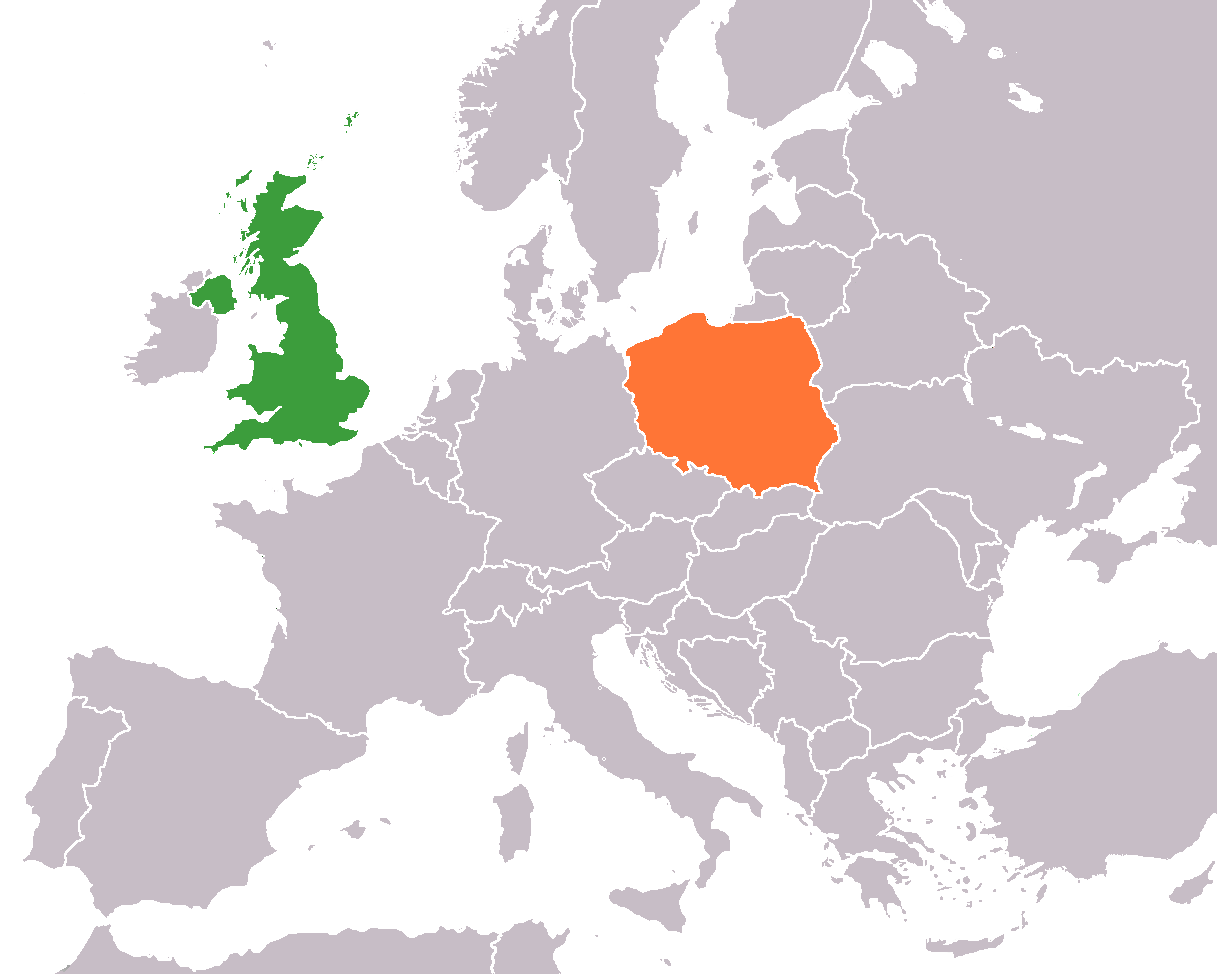

- United Kingdom: Poland

Diplomatic mission
- Embassy of the United Kingdom, Warsaw: Embassy of Poland, London

Poland–United Kingdom relations are the bilateral relations between the countries of United Kingdom and Poland. Exchanges between the two countries date back to medieval times, when Britain and Poland, then one of Europe's largest countries, were linked by trade and diplomacy. As a result of the 18th-century Partitions of the Polish–Lithuanian Commonwealth by its neighbours, the number of Polish immigrants to Britain increased in the aftermath of two 19th-century uprisings (November Uprising of 1831 and January Uprising of 1863) which forced much of Poland's social and political elite into exile. A number of Polish exiles fought in the Crimean War on the British side.

The number of Poles in the UK increased during the Second World War. Most of the Polish people who came to the United Kingdom at that time comprised military units reconstituted outside Poland after the German and Soviet invasion of Poland in September 1939, which marked the beginning of World War II. On 3 September 1939, Britain and France, which were allied with Poland, declared war on Germany. Poland moved its government abroad, first to France and, after its fall in May 1940, to London. The Poles contributed greatly to the Allied war effort and the Polish Air Force pilots played a conspicuous role in the Battle of Britain and the Polish army formed in Britain later fought during Operation Overlord. The Polish Government in Exile, though denied majority international recognition after 1945, remained at its post in London until formally dissolved in 1991, after a democratically elected president had taken office in Warsaw.

Currently, both countries are NATO and OECD members and allies. Since the European Union's 2004 enlargement, a significant number of Poles emigrated to the United Kingdom and now constitute one of the largest ethnic minorities in the country. The United Kingdom gave full support to Poland's applications for membership in the European Union and NATO.

== History ==
=== Medieval period ===
Some Polish merchants reached England in the 14th century.

According to the Polish historian Oskar Halecki, there was a piece of correspondence by King Henry V of England to Władysław II Jagiełło, King of Poland and Grand Duke of Lithuania requesting his assistance against France in the Hundred Years' War. English–Polish relations had continued in the following years largely in the area of commerce, and diplomacy.

=== 16th–17th centuries ===
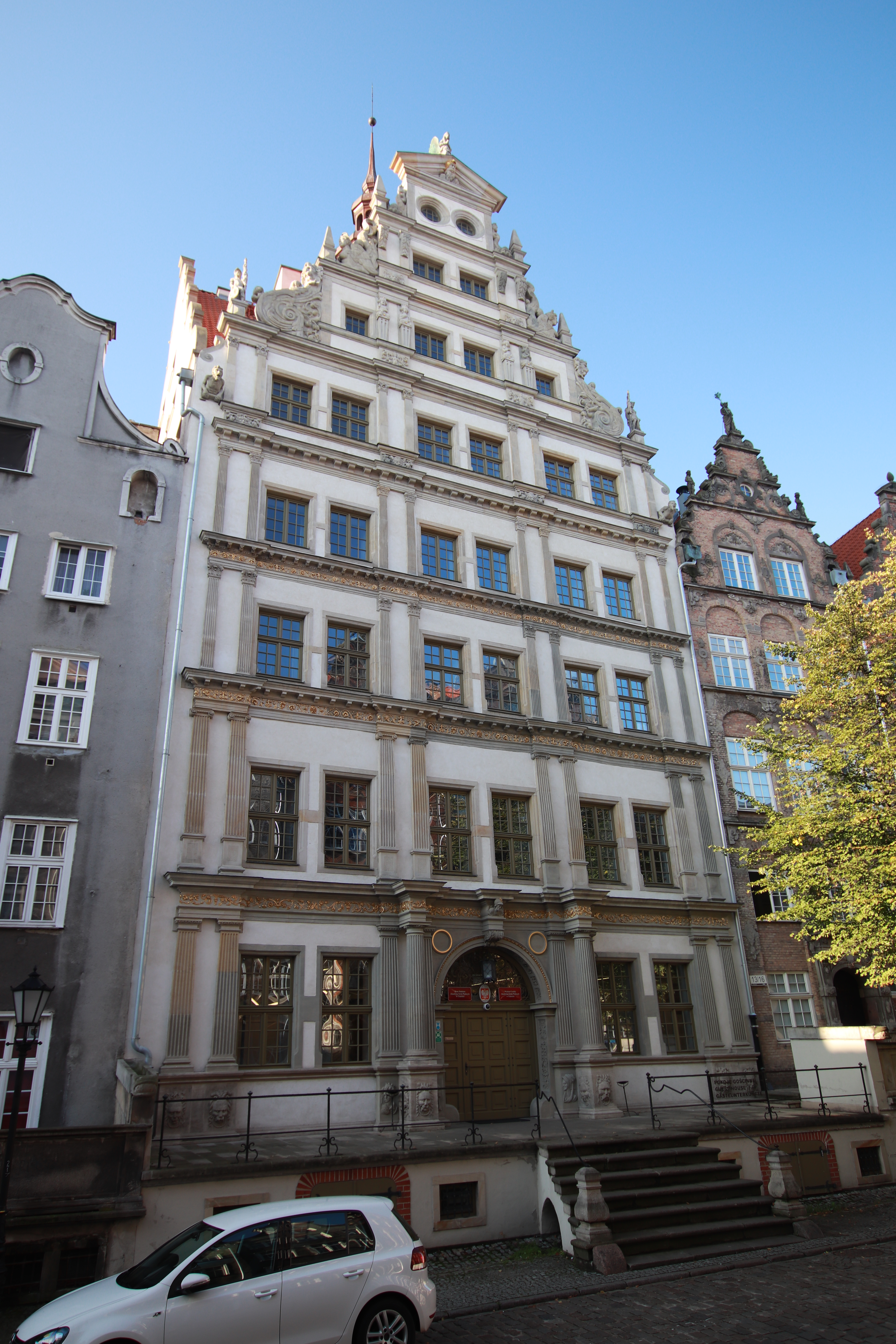
The so-called "English House" in Gdańsk, former meeting place of English merchants in 1640–1690

The 16th century saw the height of early modern diplomatic relations between Poland-Lithuania and England. When Queen Mary I of England and King Philip II of Spain were married in 1554, Krzysztof Warszewicki was present to attend and witness their wedding. Warszewicki was at the time of the Tudor-Habsburg marriage page to Ferdinand, King of the Romans. According to Norman Davies, Warszewicki later became a notable Polish diplomat. The English Eastland Company, founded in 1579, fostered trade between England and Poland. In early modern times, England was Poland's second largest partner in maritime trade (after the Netherlands). The Poles imported mainly cloth from England, while the English imported mainly grain, flax, iron, ash, tar, ship ropes and wood for shipbuilding from Poland.

After the death of Queen Mary I, her sister, Elizabeth I, ascended to the English throne. Unlike her Catholic sister, Queen Elizabeth I was a Protestant and gave her support to the Dutch cause against their Spanish Habsburg overlords in the Eighty Years' War. With the English and the Dutch at war with the Spaniards, the conflict adversely affected the Spanish trade with the Polish port city of Gdańsk as British and Dutch navies' privateers would seize Spanish vessels, including those sailing for Poland. It and, by extension, the city of Gdańsk sent Paweł Działyński to the Dutch and the English to persuade them to stop their attacks against Spanish ships headed for Gdańsk. However, as Norman Davies writes, Działyński was overly direct and blunt by threatening the Dutch and the English with an embargo of their merchants and goods. Queen Elizabeth I responded with an equally-blunt response, and Działyński's mission ultimately failed. English diplomats and merchants enjoyed transit through Poland to the Middle East to bypass Spanish spies and trade rivals in the Mediterranean.

The migration of Scots to Poland, dating back to 1380, intensified in the 16th and 17th centuries, resulting in the formation of a notable Scottish diaspora in Poland. The Scots were referred by Davies as "British Trading Agents".

=== 18th century ===
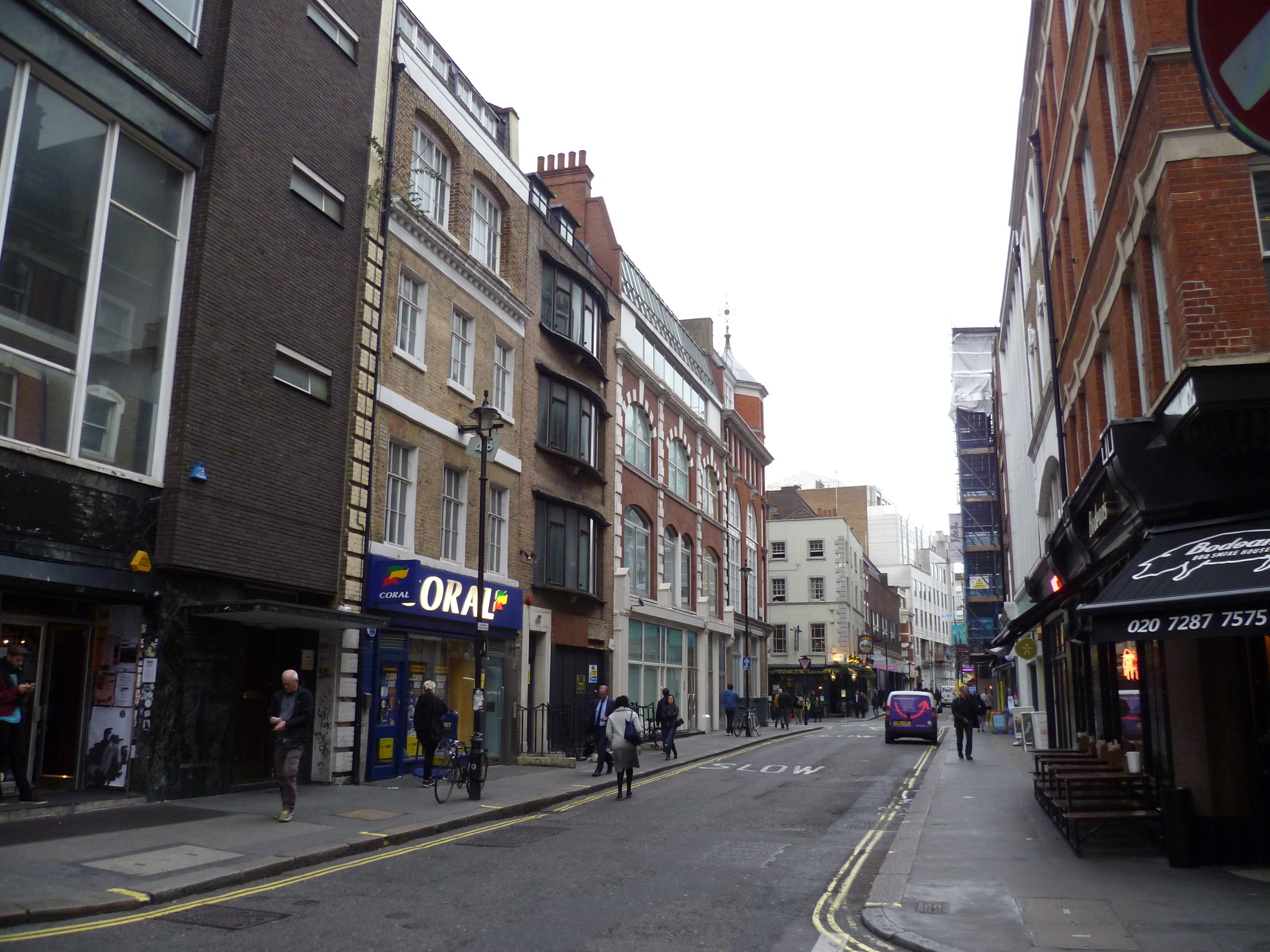
Poland Street, today, in London's Soho district

As the 18th century dawned, the sun was setting slowly over the Polish–Lithuanian Commonwealth. The Saxon Kings of Poland–Lithuania had largely neglected Poland's diplomatic relations during this period, as they preferred to conduct their diplomatic affairs from Saxony. That, however, did not stop the conducting of diplomatic relations with other European states. In 1744–1746, the British government concluded negotiations in a treaty between Great Britain, the Dutch Republic, Hungary and Poland-Lithuania. The multilateral agreement, which the Journal of the House of Commons calls "Treaty of Friendship and Alliance", came during the War of the Austrian Succession in which Britain fought on the side of Maria Theresa of Austria, the Queen of Hungary. Poland was a neutral power in the war and did not participate. However, as Saxony was a participant and the Elector of Saxony was the King of Poland, the treaty was signed and ratified in the name of the "Polish Republic".

With the death of Augustus III in late 1762, Stanisław August Poniatowski was elected to the Polish throne at the end of 1764. Although King George III mentioned the election of Stanisław August Poniatowski in His Majesty's most gracious speech to Parliament in 1765, his speeches to Parliament in 1772 and 1773 made no references to the 1772 First Partition of Poland by Russia, Prussia, and Austria. In 1789, after the imposition of high customs duties by Prussia on Polish goods transported through seized Polish Pomerania to the still Polish port of Gdańsk, Britain, interested in continued trade with Poland, tried to persuade Poland to relinquish its cities of Gdańsk and Toruń to Prussia in exchange for declared British guarantees of continued free use of the Gdańsk port by Poland and a reduction in Prussian duties, but the Polish Parliament declined.

George III did not mention the Second Partition in his 1793 speech to Parliament or the Third and Final Partition in his 1795 speech to Parliament. In reaction to the decision of His Majesty's Government to make no diplomatic protests against the actions of Russia, Prussia, and Austria, the 18th- and 19th-century contemporaries in Britain on the European continent and scholars of Polish history have often made the conclusion that Britain was indifferent to the situation in Poland.

Although Britain seemed to be largely indifferent to the Partitions of Poland, many of Britain's political elites, including George III and Edmund Burke, voiced their concerns in their correspondences and publications about the partitions and the imbalance of power in Europe that they had created.

=== 19th century ===
During the Congress of Vienna, Lord Castlereagh, British Foreign Secretary from 1812 to 1822, was a major proponent of restoration of Polish independence, but he later dropped that point to attain ground in areas on which the United Kingdom had greater interest.

In the 19th century, frosty British–Russian relations prompted more interest in an independent Poland from Britain. In the British populace too, sympathy for Poland and the other oppressed peoples of Europe was common.

=== 20th century ===
Britain, along with its allies France and the United States, was crucial in securing Polish independence at the end of World War I in order to recruit national minorities against the Central Powers of Germany and Austria-Hungary. During the Paris Peace Conference at the end of World War I, the British delegation under David Lloyd George opposed France and the United States's territorial concessions towards Poland as excessive and potentially provocative towards the Weimar Republic. Lloyd George was influential in making Danzig (Gdańsk) an autonomous city-state rather than a direct Polish territory, and also secured the Upper Silesia plebiscite. Another major point of disagreement was the point of its eastern borders.

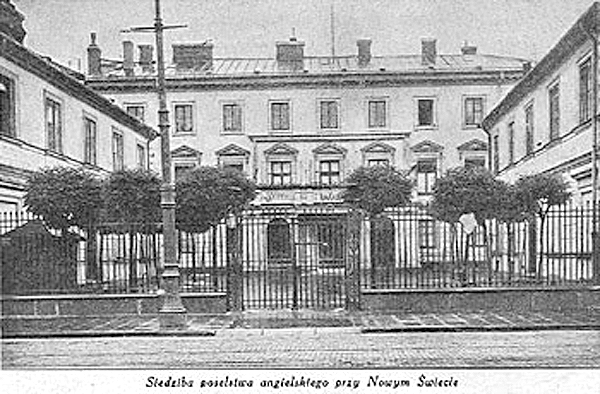
Branicki Palace at the New World Street, Warsaw, seat of the British Embassy in Poland in 1923–1939

During the Polish-Soviet War, the support of the British government was truly with Poland, but peace was by far the preferred option resulting in Lord Curzon's drawing of the Curzon Line as part of an attempted mediated peace. The agreement was not adopted in time, and Poland soon took the upper hand in the war pushing its border further to the east. Lloyd-George adopted a policy in which it would support Poland's defense against the Soviet Red Army west of the Curzon Line but would oppose attempts to reconquer its pre-Partition borders as its leader Józef Piłsudski desired.

During the 1920s and the early 1930s, British views of Poland were generally negative because of its expansionism and treatment of ethnic minorities. That was particularly the case from the British left. Overall, the right wing in Britain, meanwhile, held more neutral views of Poland because of its position as a buffer against the Soviet Union.

Poland's view of Britain was then generally ambivalent. France or even Germany was then the primary focus of British friendship and attempts to gain protection. The first Polish embassy in London was established only in 1929.

With the rise of the Nazi party in Germany, the British and the Poles began to see more of a point in friendly relations. On 31 March 1939, the British made a guarantee of independence to Poland. On 25 August, an Anglo-Polish military alliance was signed. At first glance, that treaty was just a catch-all mutual assistance pact against the aggression of any other European nation, but a secret protocol attached to the agreement made clear that it was to defend Poland from Germany.

==== Second World War ====
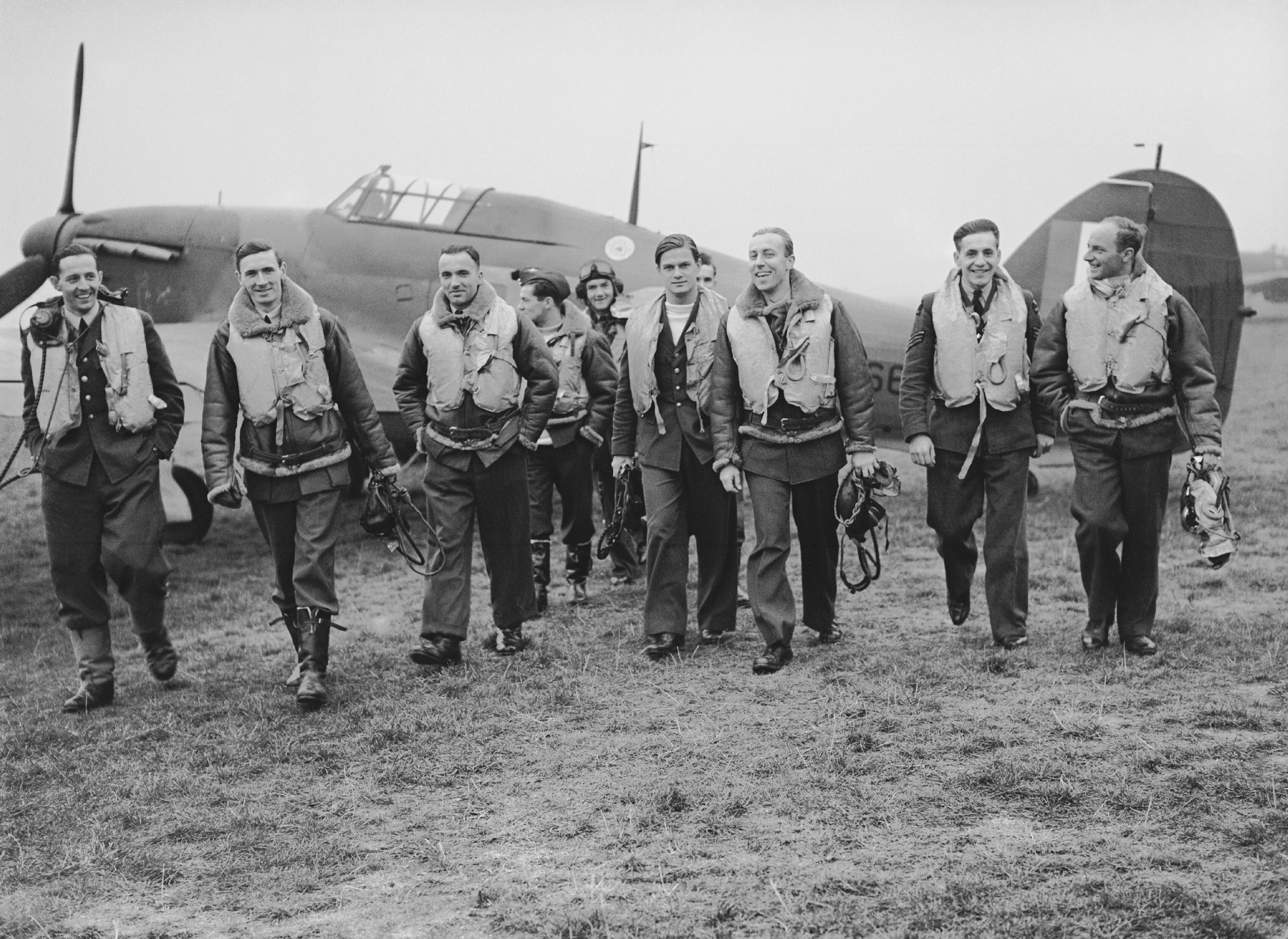
303 Polish Fighter Squadron during the Battle of Britain, October 1940

After the German annexation of Czechoslovakia, Britain abandoned its foreign policy of appeasement and declared that an annexation of Poland would mean war. In March 1939, the British gave up on plans to avoid sending an army to the continent in the event of conflict with Germany and to rely on the Royal Navy and the Royal Air Force. Plan were put in place for eventually providing 32 divisions, starting with two Corp of two divisions each, within 33 days of mobilization.

After the invasion of Poland by Nazi Germany in September 1939, Britain and France declared war on Germany on 3 September and honourings agreement signed with Poland, and a British naval blockade of Germany was initiated. On 4 September, an RAF raid against Kriegsmarine warships in Wilhelmshaven was undertaken, and the British Expeditionary Force (BEF) left the British Isles to arrive in France, where it was immediately placed under French 1st Army Group and so it was stationed in the defensive line on the French/Belgium border. In September 1939, however, the BEF had only two divisions, with severe shortages of modern equipment. By the end of September, it had doubled in size to four divisions, but severe equipment shortages continued. The divisions fulfilled the undertaking given for two Army Corps assembled in France 33 days after mobilization.

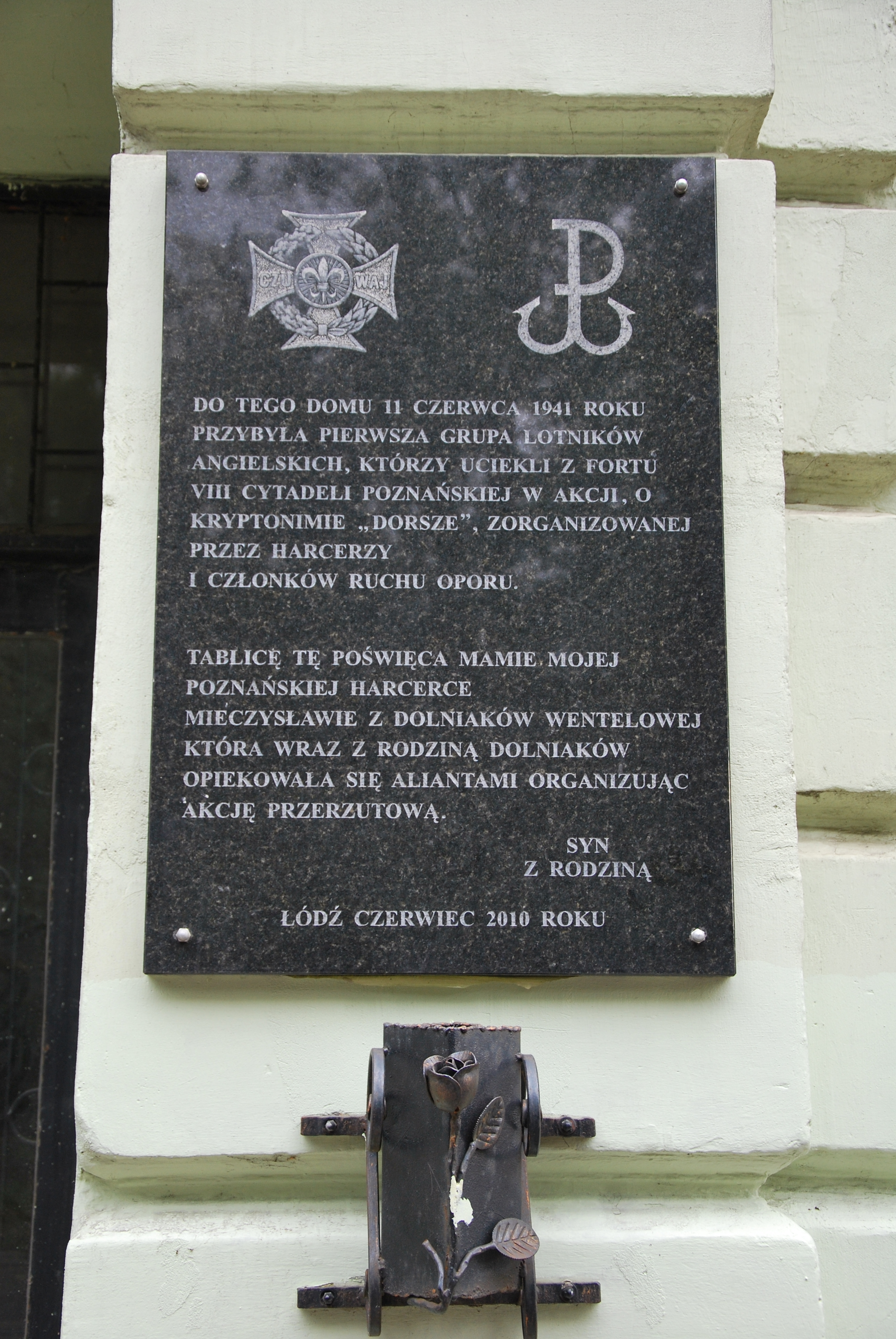
Memorial plaque in Łódź at the place to which British pilots escaped from the Stalag XXI-D German POW camp in 1941 during the Dorsze action organized by the Polish resistance

It had been decided that no major air operations against Germany would take place because of French concerns over reprisals on RAF launches from French airfields, against targets in Germany and so most British bomber activity over Germany was the dropping of propaganda leaflets and reconnaissance. That theme would continue in meetings of the Anglo-French Supreme War Council meetings until 1940.

The Polish government-in-exile was based in London since 1940. During the war, 250,000 Polish people served with British forces taking part in many key campaigns. A twelfth of all pilots in the Battle of Britain were Polish. Poles were among the prisoners of German forced labour camps in the occupied Channel Islands, and British prisoners of war were among Allied POWs held in German POW camps and forced labour subcamps operated in occupied Poland. The Polish resistance movement helped British POWs escape from German POW camps, gave shelter to POWs who had escaped from German POW camps and forced labor camps, and organized their escapes either by sea to neutral Sweden or by land through Hungary to southeastern Europe.

Gibraltar was the site of the 1943 Gibraltar Liberator AL523 crash, in which General Władysław Sikorski, the commander-in-chief of the Polish Army and Prime Minister of the Polish government-in-exile, was killed. The crash was officially ruled to have been an accident, however, there are many controversies and theories surrounding it.

During the Yalta Conference and the postwar alteration of Poland's borders, British-Polish relations hit a low because Britain was perceived to have compromised over Poland's fate so readily. Poland saw that in a particularly negative light because of its large contribution to the war effort and its sacrifices.

After the war, many Polish servicemen remained in Britain and further numbers of refugees arrived in the country.

==== Cold War ====
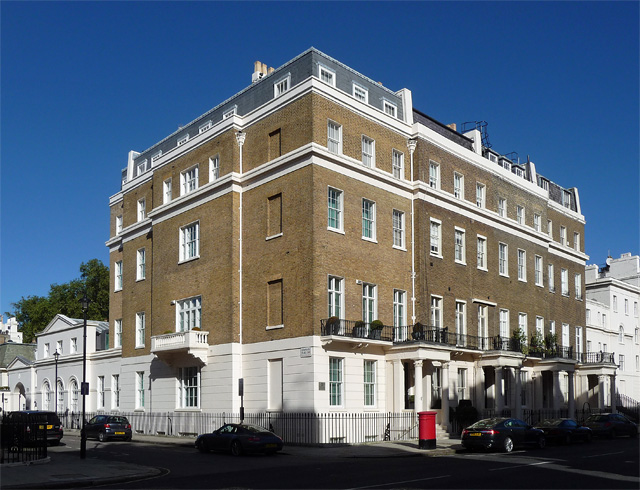
Seat of the Presidents of Poland-in-exile in London

At first, British relations to Soviet-occupied Polish People's Republic were largely neutral with some sections of the far left even being supportive of the regime. The Polish government-in-exile remained in place at 43 Eaton Place, London, however, and no Poles were forced to return home.

During the Cold War, Poland retained a largely-negative view of Britain as part of the West. British efforts meanwhile were focused at trying to split Poland from the Warsaw Pact and encouraging reforms in the country.

==== After Cold War ====
In the 1990s and the 2000s, the newly-democratic Poland maintained close relations with Britain; both in defence matters and within the European Union. Britain was one of only a few countries to allow equal rights to Polish workers upon Polish accession in 2004 after which 375,000 Poles registered to work in Britain.

The results of the 2011 British census has shown that Polish is now the second most common spoken first language in Northern Ireland, after English, and surpassed Ulster Scots and Irish. Poland and the United Kingdom have staged several intergovernmental consultations, the last of which took place in December 2018 in London with Prime Ministers Theresa May and Mateusz Morawiecki and their cabinet members.

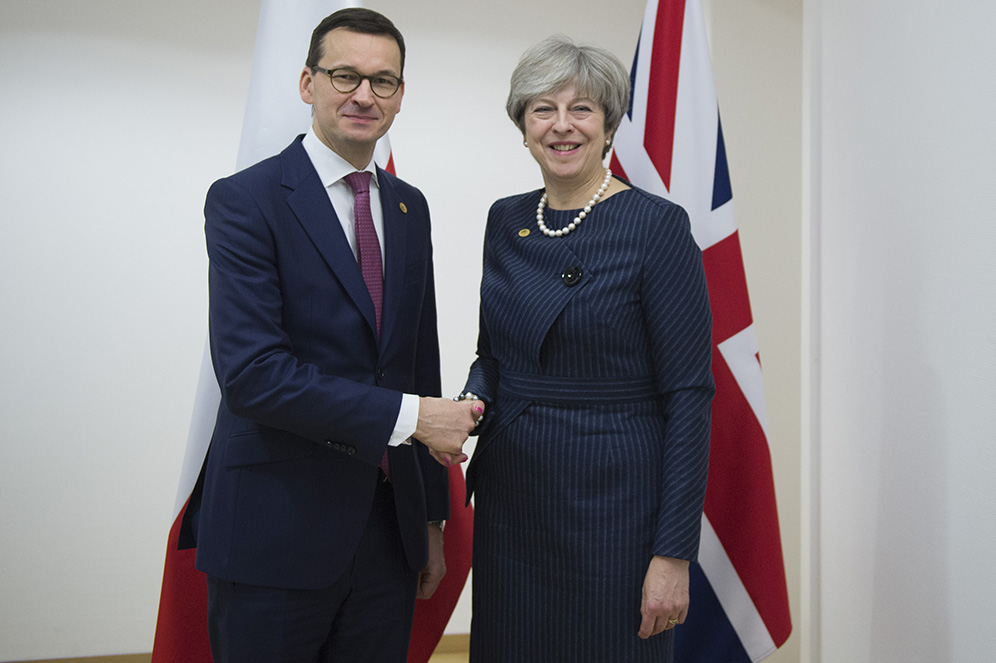
Mateusz Morawiecki and Theresa May, Brussels, Belgium 2017

The United Kingdom is the largest importer of Polish goods outside the EU, and the third largest importer of Polish goods overall (as of 2019).

In December 2020, Poland sent medical and military personnel to help administer more than 15,000 COVID-19 tests to people who were stuck in a huge roadblock outside the English Channel in Kent, thus allowing them to enter France and relieving the traffic jam.

In November 2021, during the Belarus–European Union border crisis, the United Kingdom sent 150 British army Royal Engineers to support Poland's border security.

In response to the Russian military build-up proceeding the invasion, on 17 February 2022, the UK, Poland and Ukraine agreed a British–Polish–Ukrainian trilateral pact to strengthen strategic cooperation between the three countries. In a poll published by Rating Group, Ukrainian respondents voted in favour of closer ties to Poland and the UK as opposed to NATO membership.

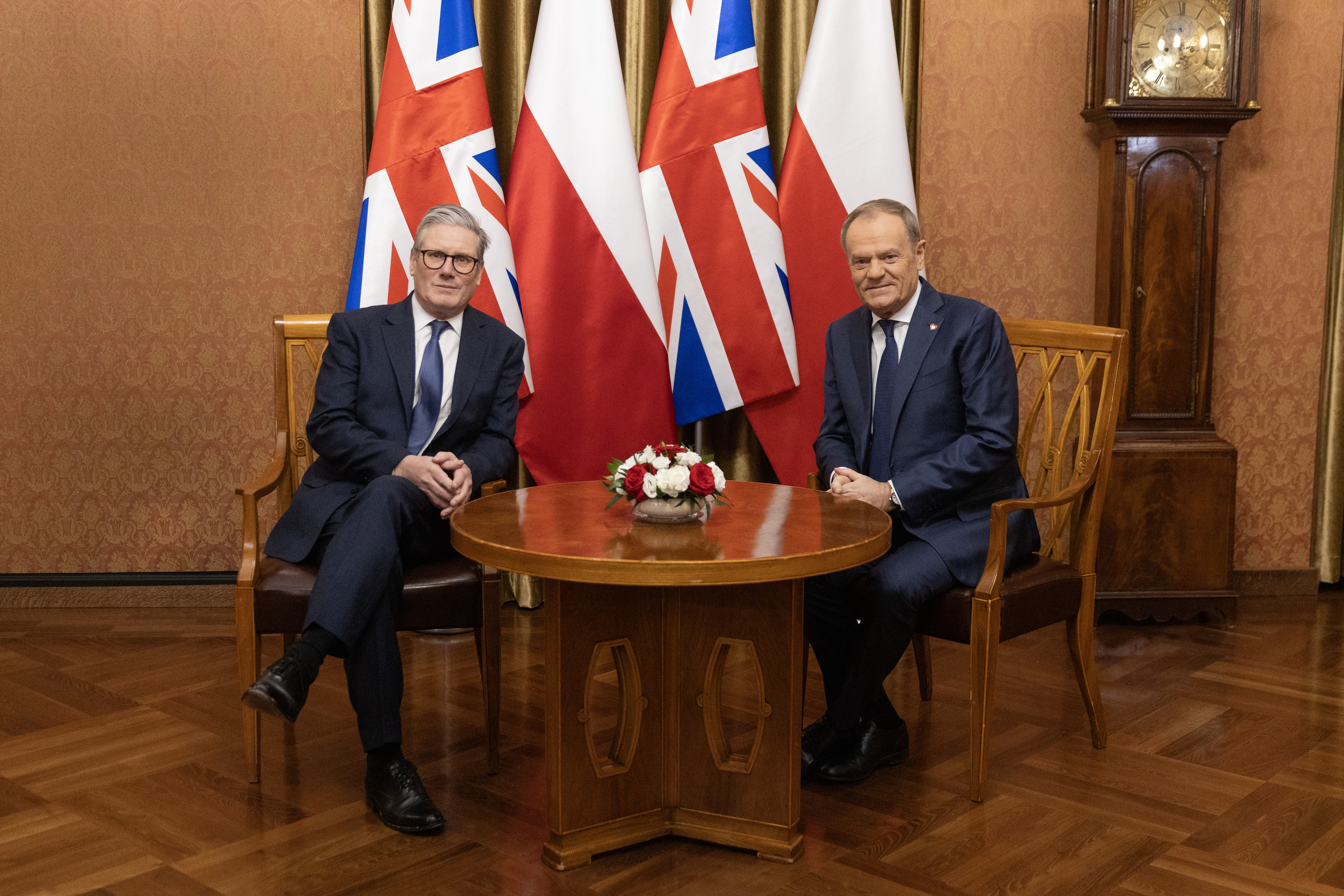
British Prime Minister Keir Starmer with Polish Prime Minister Donald Tusk in Warsaw, 17 January 2025

In May 2026, the UK and Poland entered into a new security and defence partnership which aims to strengthen co-operation and resolve in the face of shared foreign policy challenges, namely the increasing threat posed by Russia to both countries.

== Diplomatic relations ==
- Poland has an embassy in London and consulates-general in Belfast, Edinburgh and Manchester.
- United Kingdom has an embassy in Warsaw.
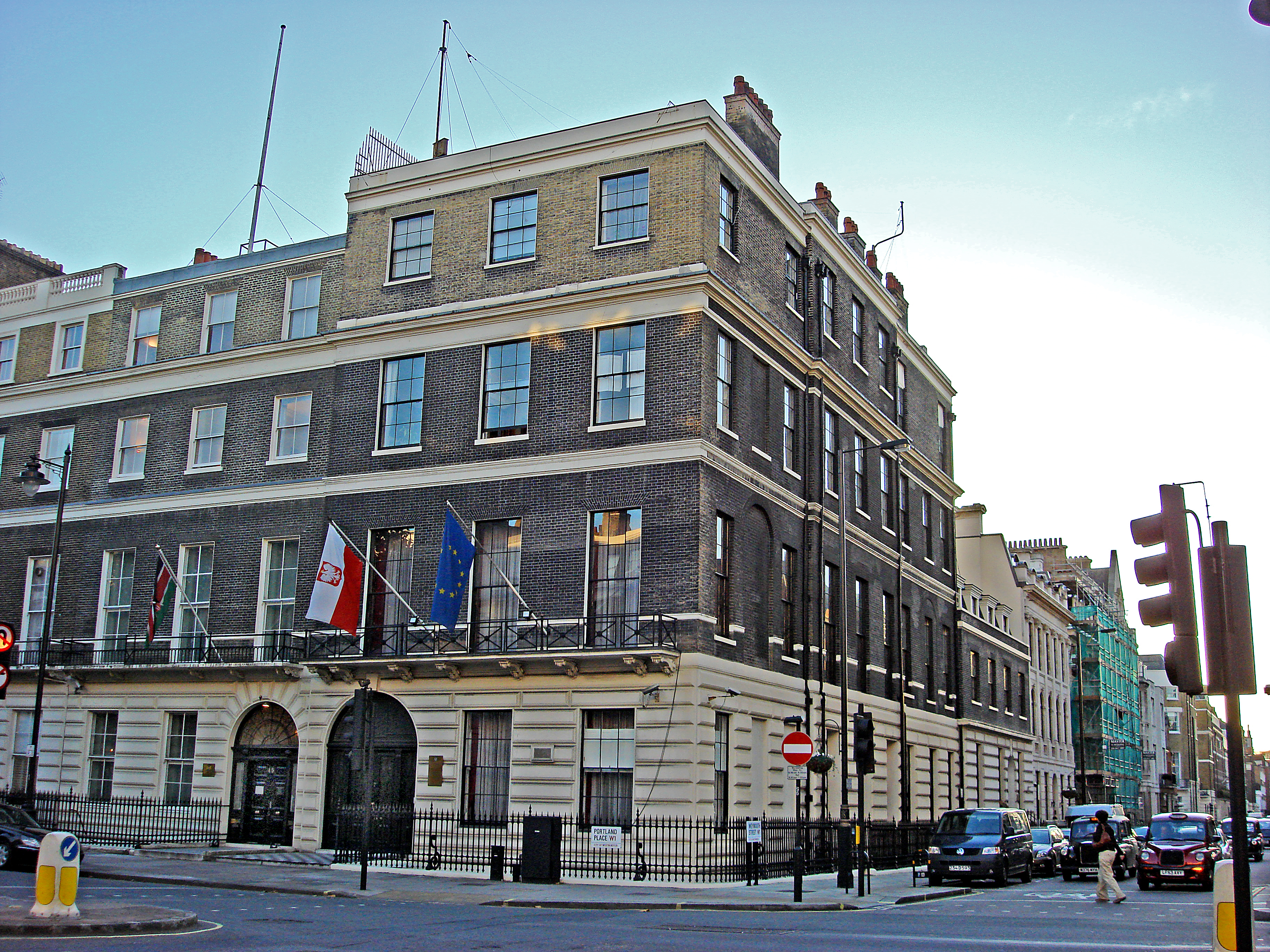
Embassy of Poland in London

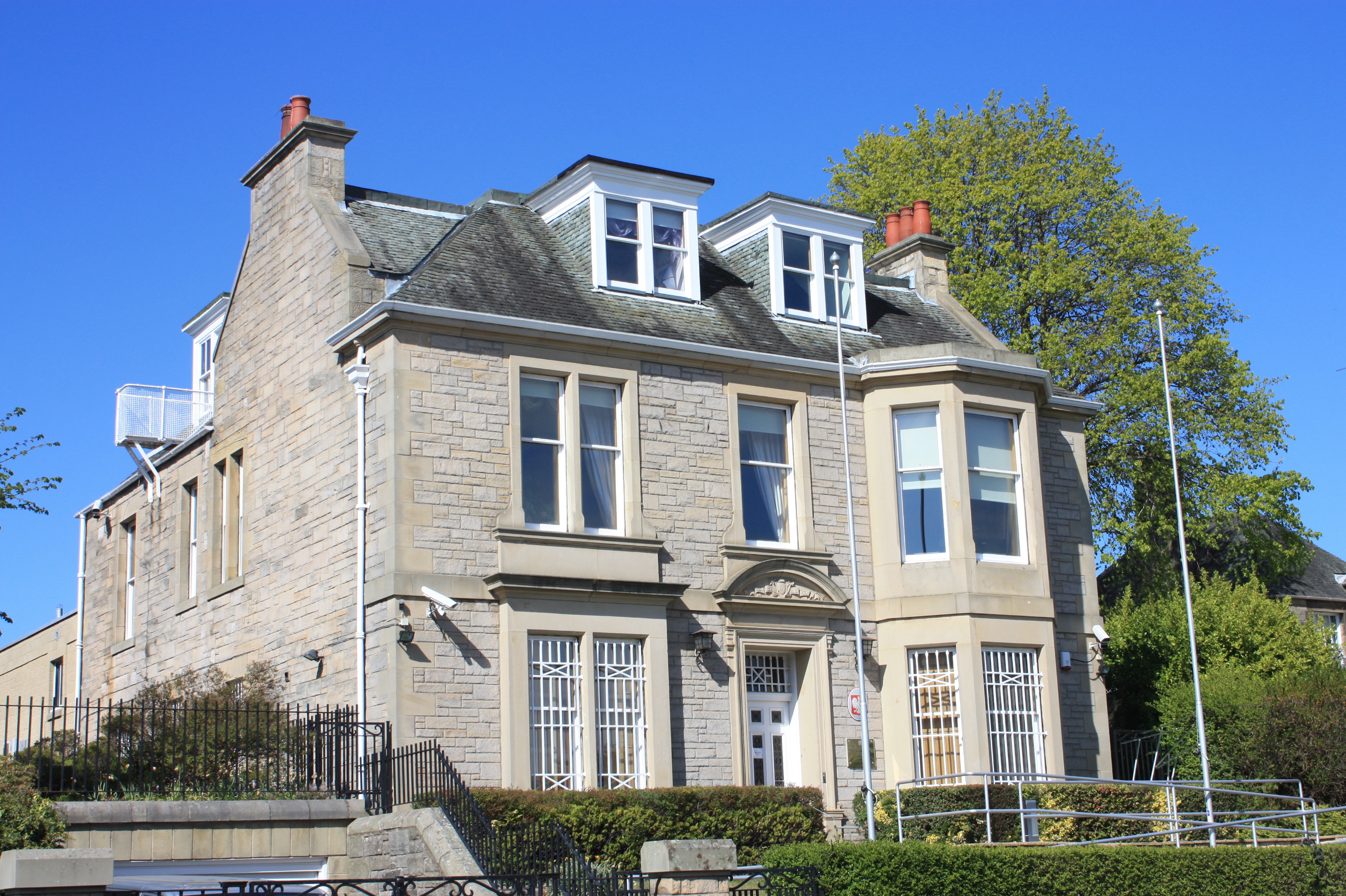
Consulate-General of Poland in Edinburgh

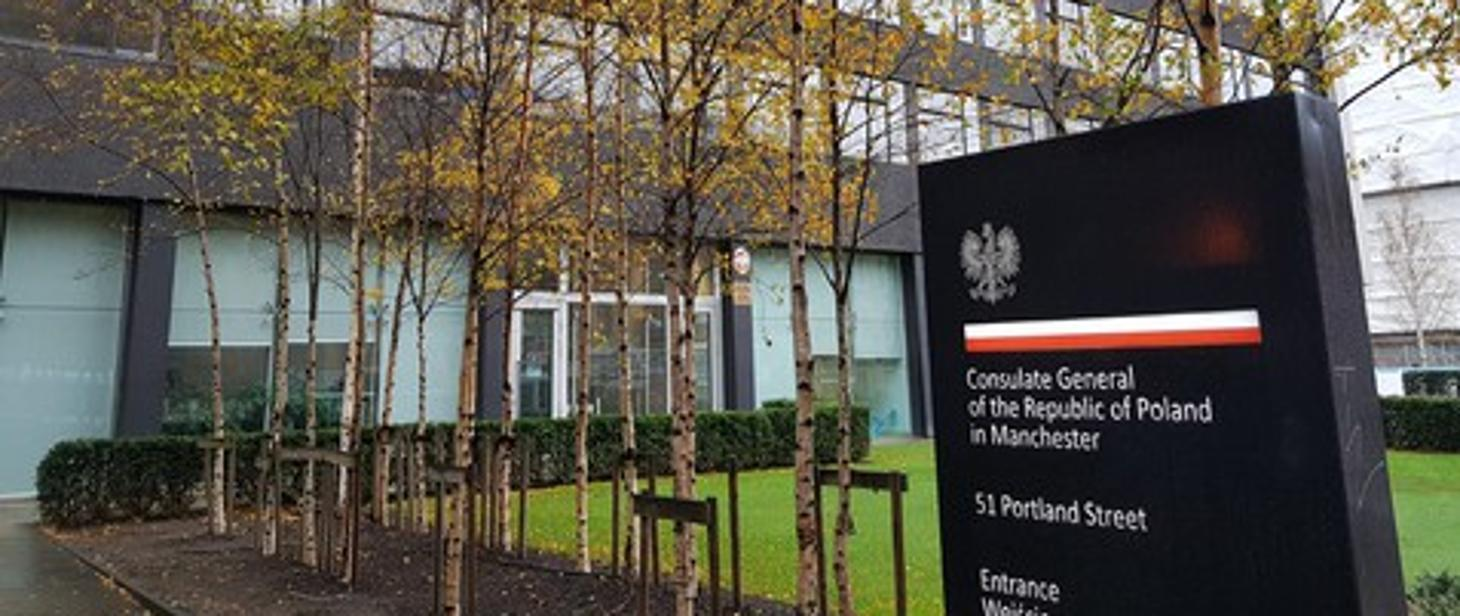
Consulate-General of Poland in Manchester
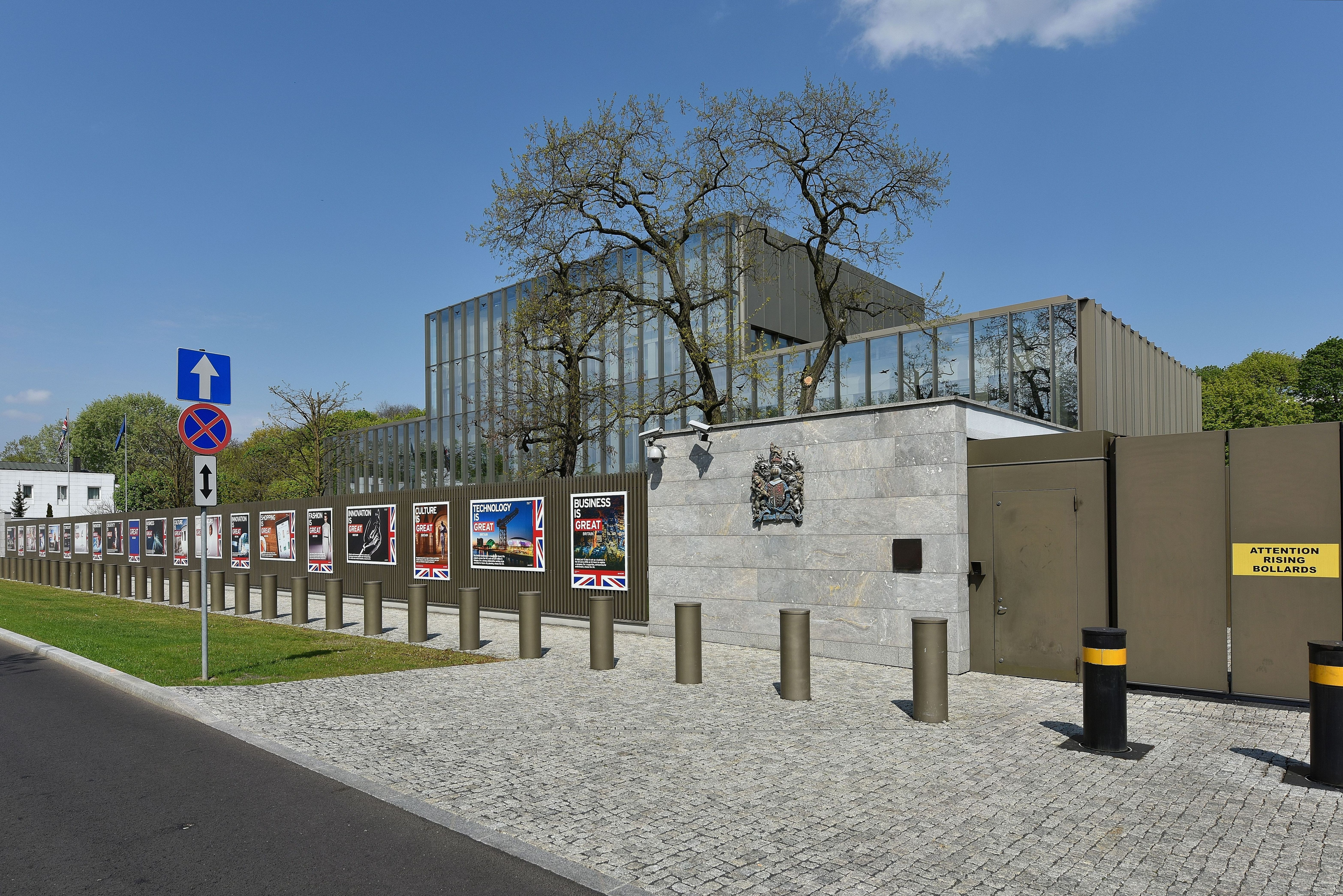
Embassy of the United Kingdom in Warsaw

== Economic relations ==
Trade between the United Kingdom and Poland is governed by the EU–UK Trade and Cooperation Agreement since 1 January 2021.

== See also ==
- Embassy of Poland, London
- Embassy of the United Kingdom, Warsaw
- List of Ambassadors from the United Kingdom to Poland
- List of Ambassadors of Poland to the United Kingdom
- Poles in the United Kingdom
- English people in Poland
- Scots in Poland
- Anglo-Polish military alliance
- Anglo-Polish Radio ORLA.fm
- United Kingdom–European Union relations
- List of twin towns and sister cities in the United Kingdom
- List of twin towns and sister cities in Poland
