= Aleksander Kropiwnicki =

Polish journalist, editor, diplomat

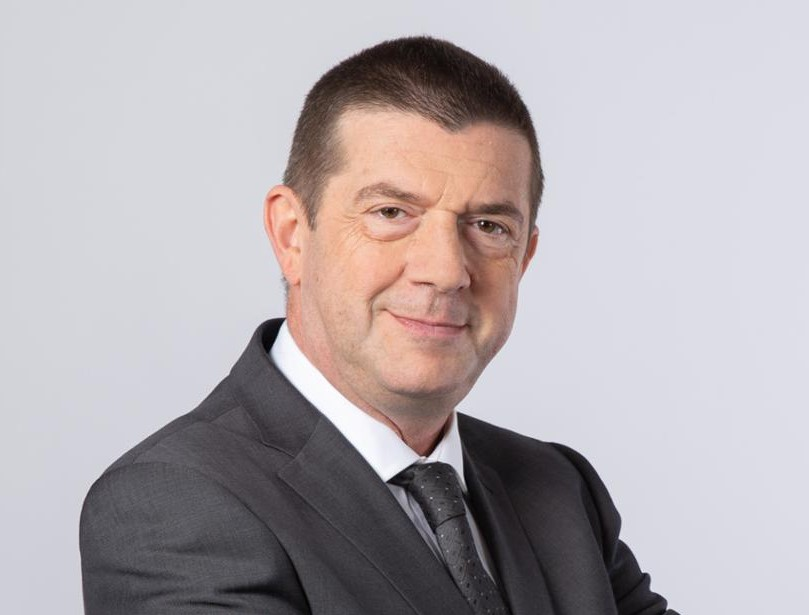

Poland Ambassador to Ethiopia
- In office July 2017 – 31 July 2020
- Preceded by: Jacek Jankowski
- Succeeded by: Przemysław Bobak

Personal details
- Born: 3 January 1962 (age 64) Warsaw
- Children: 2
- Education: University of Warsaw
- Profession: diplomat, journalist, editor

Aleksander Kropiwnicki (born 3 January 1962, Warsaw) is a Polish journalist, editor and diplomat who served an ambassador of Poland to Ethiopia (2017–2020).

== Life ==
Aleksander Kropiwnicki has finished Polish studies at the University of Warsaw. Between 1987 and 2001 he worked as a reporter and columnist in several newspapers, e.g. Tygodnik Solidarność. In 1993, as a fellow of the Alfred Friendly Press Fellowships, he spent six months in The Detroit News. Between 1997 and 2001 he was chief editor of the Polski Kalendarz Europejski (Polish European Calendar) monthly.

He was a member of Władysław Bartoszewski cabinet. In 2001 he started his diplomatic career at the embassy in London as a press counsellor. In 2006 he was head of one of the sections of the Polish Radio in Warsaw. In 2008 he began working for the Ministry of Foreign Affairs as a deputy director and, later, as a department director. Between 2011 and 2014 he was at the embassy in Nairobi, running it also as chargé d’Affaires. In July 2017, he was appointed Poland Ambassador to Ethiopia. He has also been accredited to Djibouti, South Sudan and the African Union. He is responsible for relations with IGAD and UNECA, as well. He finished his term on 31 July 2020. In January 2025 he became Chargé d'affaires of Poland in Iceland.

== Works ==
- Błyskawiczny kurs Savoir-Vivre'u [with Katarzyna Kropiwnicka], Publicat, 2007, ISBN 978-83-245-0780-1.
- Zajezdnia Londyn, Warszawa, Bydgoszcz: Oficyna Wydawnicza Branta, 2007, ISBN 978-83-60186-57-2.
- Czarny wulkan, Warszawa: Rytm, 1993, ISBN 83-85249-21-4.
