= Embassy of the United Kingdom, Warsaw =

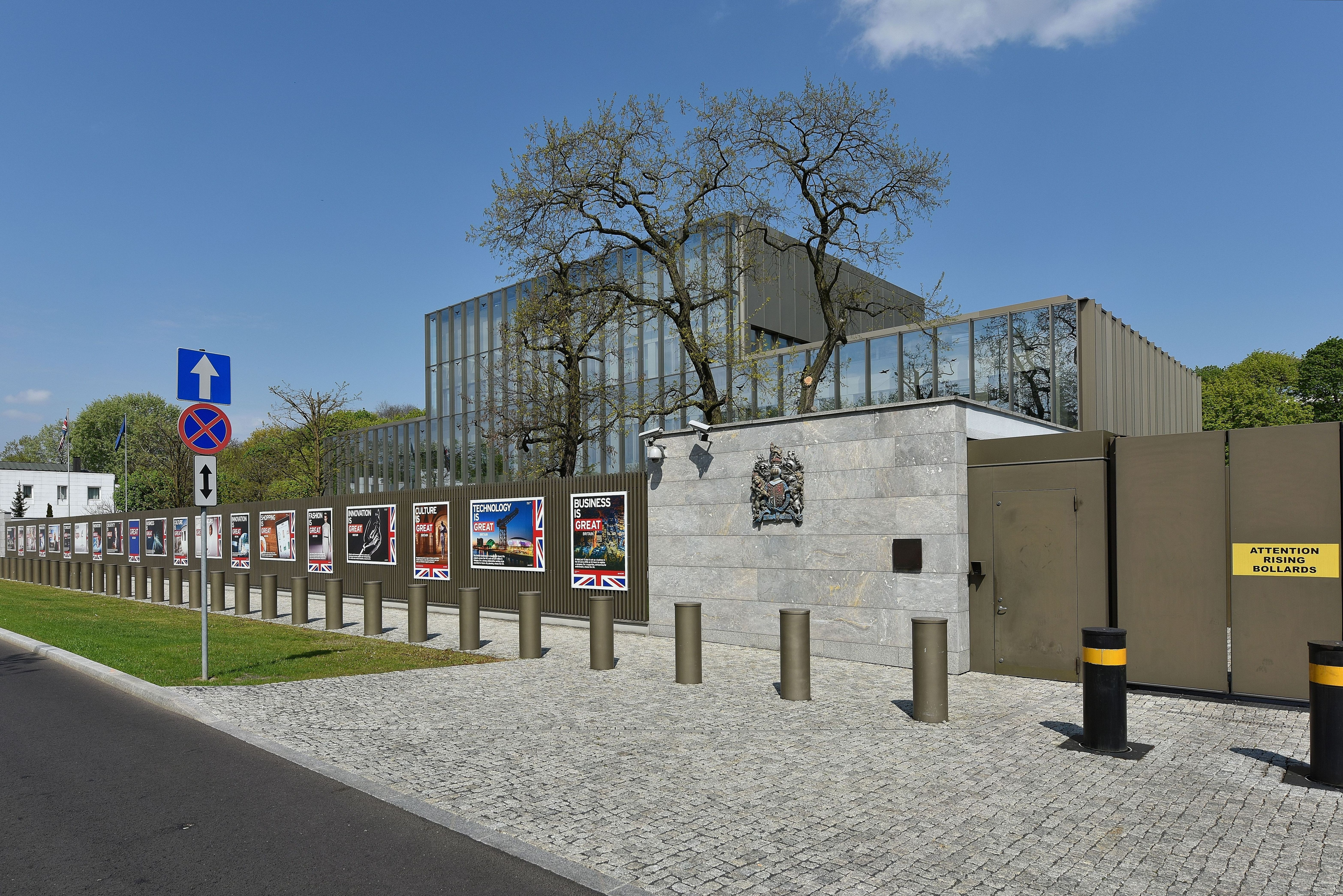
- The Embassy building in Warsaw
- Location: (Poland) Ujazdów, Warsaw
- Address: ul. Kawalerii 12, 00-468 Warsaw, Masovian Province, Poland
- Coordinates: 52.2186°N 21.0399°E
- Ambassador: Melinda Simmons
- Website: British Embassy, Warsaw

The Embassy of the United Kingdom in Warsaw is the chief diplomatic mission of the United Kingdom in Poland. It is located on Kawalerii street in the Ujazdów district. The current British Ambassador to Poland is Dame Melinda Simmons.

== History ==
The current embassy building on Kawalerii Street was built between 2008 and 2009, designed by Tony Fretton and cost £27m to construct. It is located next door to the Spanish and Dutch Embassies.

During the interwar period (1918–1939), the embassy was located in the Branicki Palace. From 1945 until 2008, the embassy was located in the Wielopolski Palace at Ujazdów Avenue 15. The embassy building was designed by Jozef Huss and built c. 1875 as the home for Polish aristocrats. The building was relatively undamaged during World War II and therefore was acquired by the British government in 1945 to house the British Embassy; previously it had been used as the Estonian Embassy.

== Gallery ==
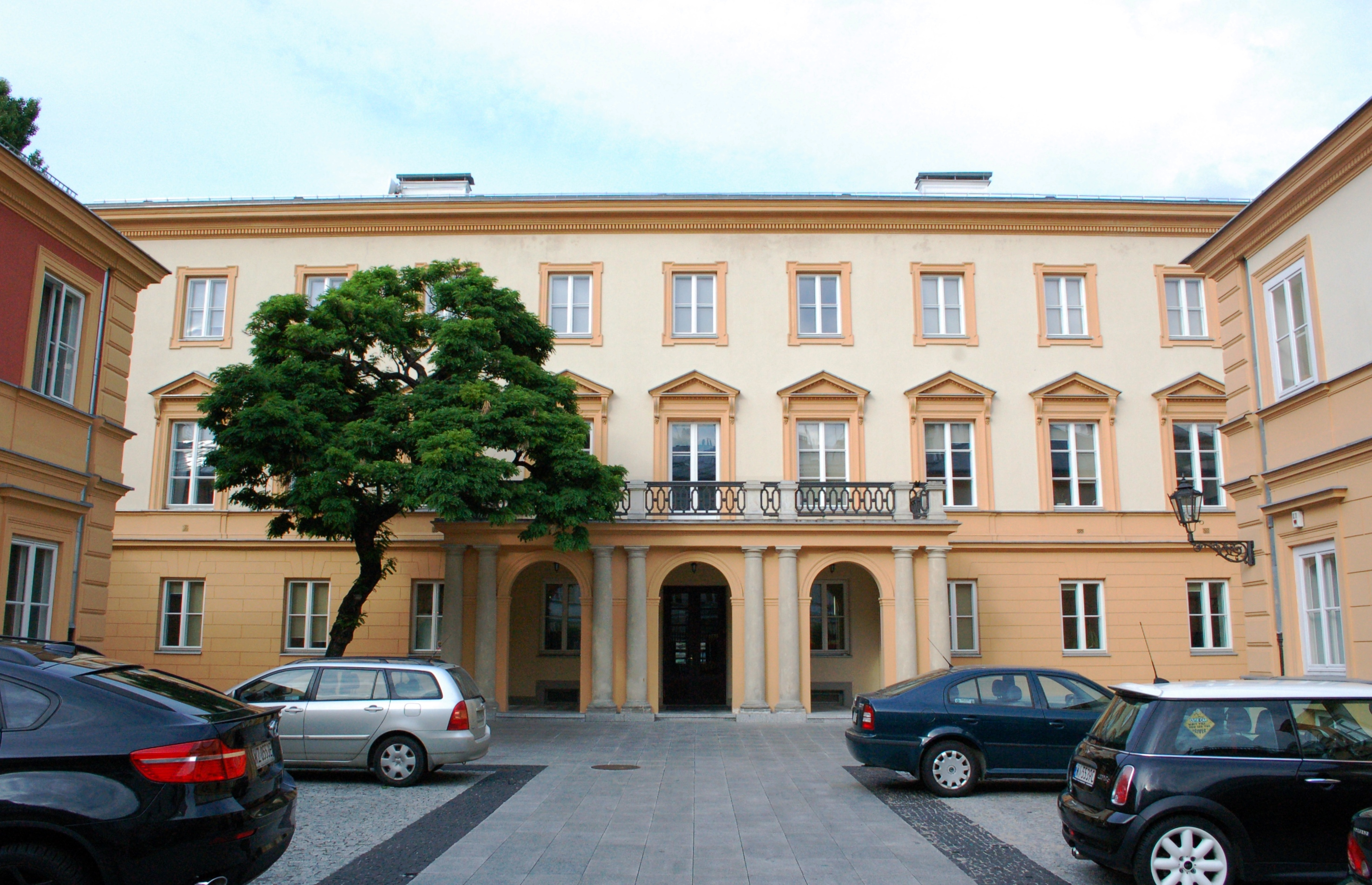
Embassy building used from 1925–1945

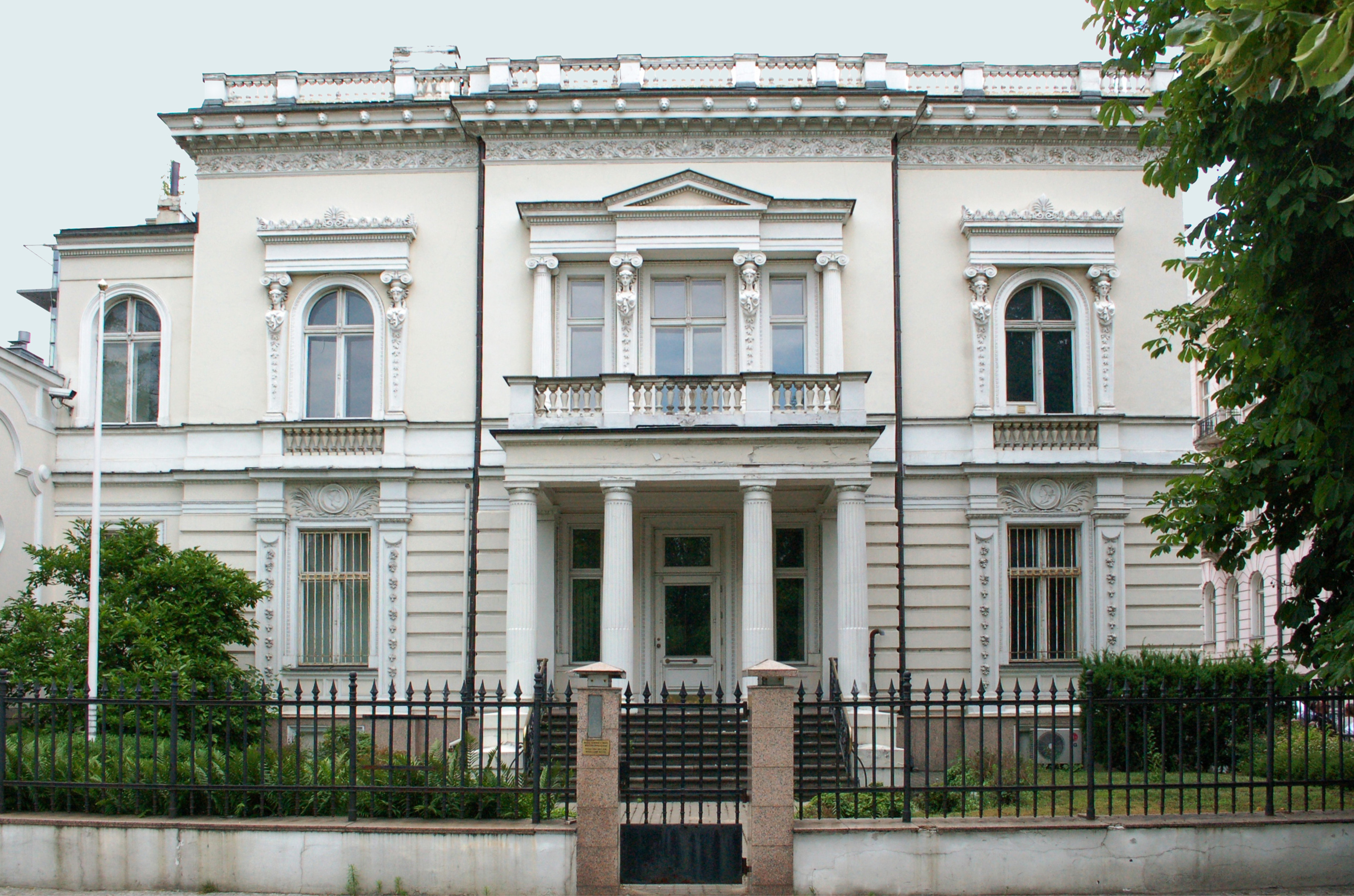
Embassy building used from 1945–2008

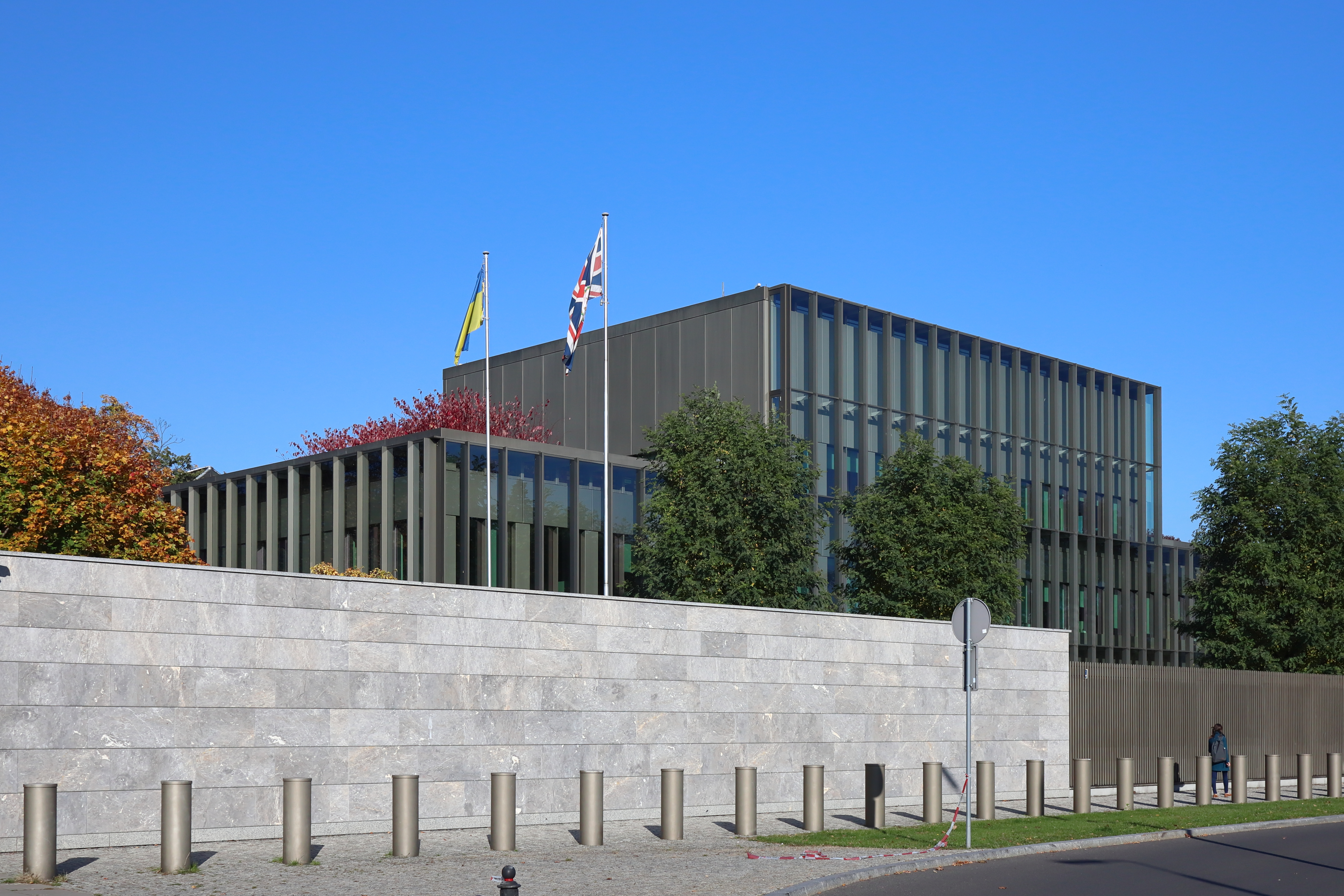
Embassy building used since 2008

== See also ==
- Poland–United Kingdom relations
- List of diplomatic missions in Poland
- List of Ambassadors of the United Kingdom to Poland
