= Embassy of Poland, London =

Ambasada Rzeczypospolitej Polskiej w Londynie Embassy of the Republic of Poland in London
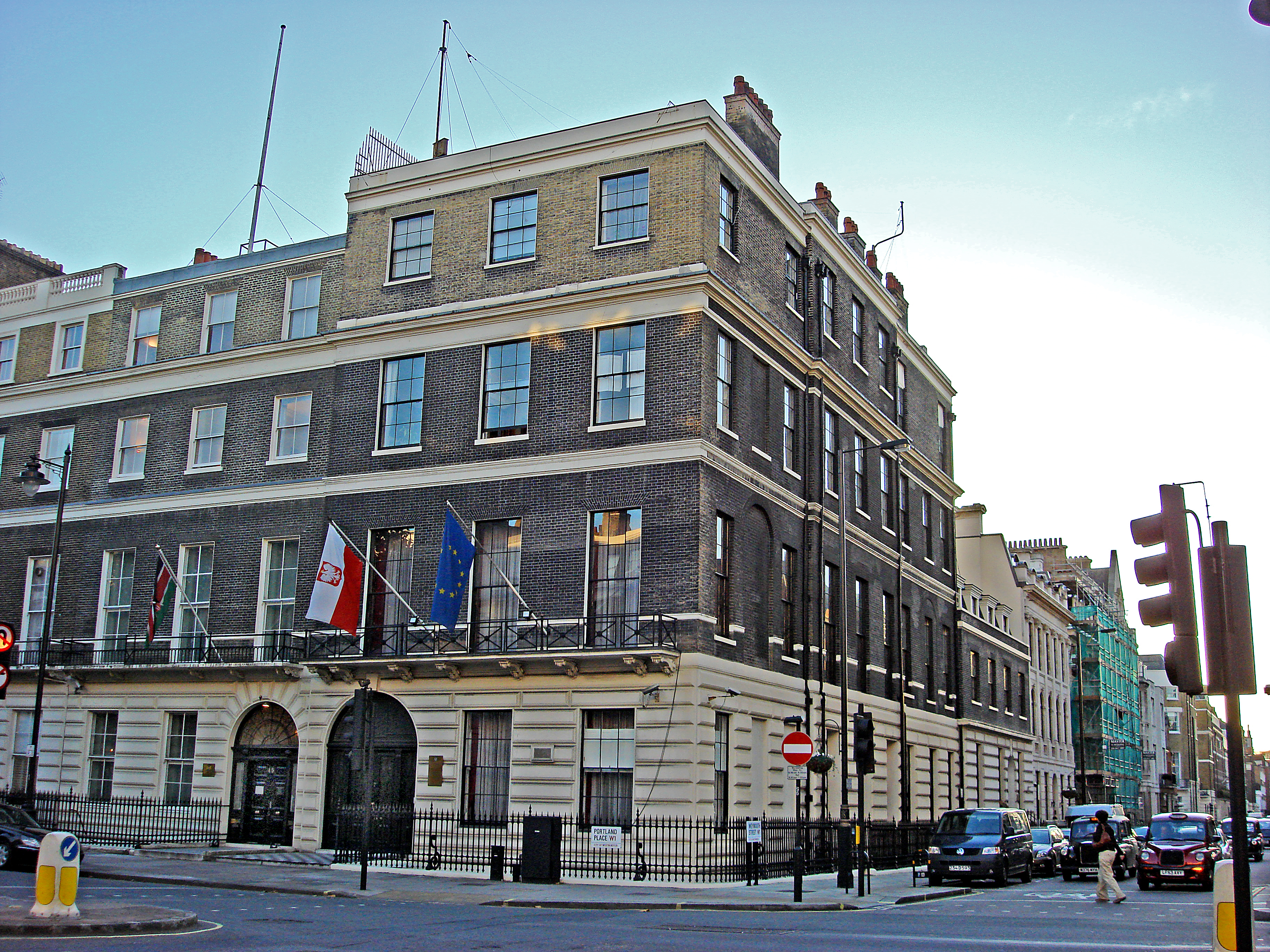
- Location: Marylebone, London
- Address: 47 Portland Place, London, W1B 1JH
- Coordinates: 51°31′15″N 0°08′44″W
- Website: www.gov.pl/web/unitedkingdom

The Embassy of the Republic of Poland in London (Polish: Ambasada Rzeczypospolitej Polskiej w Londynie) is the diplomatic mission of Poland in the United Kingdom. It is located on Portland Place next to the High Commission of Kenya building. It forms part of a group of Grade II* listed buildings in Portland Place.

== History ==
Shortly after regaining independence in 1918, there seemed to be a general feeling of ambivalence towards Britain demonstrated by most Polish statesmen, as if they were neglecting British relations, who played a major role in helping to re-establish the post-World War I – Second Polish Republic. However, with newly restored independence, the country's government instead concentrated on shoring up good relations with traditional ally France, and immediate neighbour Germany.

As a result of this focus, it was not until 1929 that the first Polish legation was sent to establish a permanent embassy in London. The establishment of this Polish embassy building in London would go on to play one of the most important roles of Poland's history.

By the late 1930s when world war was once again becoming inevitable, the government of the Second Polish Republic requested the necessary military aid from the British government; as Poland was still rebuilding civilian infrastructure from the aftermath of World War I. The government also signed a three-way mutual defence pact with the United Kingdom and France with the original intent being to make sure an independent and sovereign, democratic Poland would never again have to stand alone against a German invasion. Thus, much of the bureaucracy surrounding these pre-war pacts found itself centred in the halls and corridors of number 47, Portland Place.

As the first several months of World War II progressed, it became necessary for the transfer of the Second Polish Republic first to France, and then to London, where the Polish Embassy established ten years earlier in Portland Place became not only the nerve centre of Polish relations with the United Kingdom, but of the entire Polish Foreign Office. The embassy soon had to acquire a number of other buildings throughout the city in order to house the large number of diplomats and politicians required to make the government in exile work. For a long time, this building represented democratic Poland, fighting for its freedom and its territorial integrity.

Then, immediately after World War II, when Poland (1945–1989) was forced to become a satellite state of the Soviet Union due to Soviet takeover and decisions made on behalf of Poland without representatives present at the Yalta Conference, the British government suddenly refused to recognise the government in exile and thus the London Poles (Officials of the Polish government in exile, now from their own embassy building – as they were referred to) were forced to vacate the Polish embassy on Portland Place and so, were left only with the president-in-exile's private residence at 43 Eaton Place, whilst in the meantime officials of the newly recognized communist regime moved squarely into the original Georgian-era embassy building.

It wasn't until the fall of Communism, the Soviet Union, the Berlin Wall, the end of the Polish United Workers' Party, and the re-establishment of democratic rule under President Lech Wałęsa in 1990, that the embassy at 47 Portland Place was vacated once again; this time of the communist regime in 1989, to once again become the official seat of the primary diplomatic legation of the original Polish Republic to the United Kingdom.

It was here in the Polish Embassy in London that the initial processes to repatriate the official presidential seal and symbols of office (which had previously been evacuated to London with the government in exile at the beginning, and for the duration, of World War II and all of the years of Soviet influence) to finally re-establish in 1990 a free and democratic Poland to the Polish people living in Poland.

In 2018, It was reported by the BBC that the Polish Embassy funded Far Right speakers at a UK event in 2017.

In August 2020 people demonstrated outside the embassy in protest of the Polish Stonewall events.

== Other sections ==
Other Polish embassy sections in London include the Consular, Economic & Cultural Sections. The first deals with all documentation for foreigners requiring a visa or other permission whose intent it is to travel to Poland or the Schengen area. Additionally the consular officers deal with passport applications and confirmations of Polish citizenship made both by foreigners and Polish nationals, they offer birth registration services and can offer information and guidance on many other topics ranging from death of a loved one abroad or transfer of the body to Poland to legal services and recommendations for personal safety.

Poland maintains the Consular, Cultural Institute & Economic Sections at Bravura House, 10 Bouverie Street, Blackfriars. The Polish Cultural Institute was formerly located at 52–53 Poland Street, Soho.

== See also ==
- Poland–United Kingdom relations
- List of all previous Polish ambassadors to the Court of St James

== Gallery ==
Polish Governmental and Diplomatic Plaque

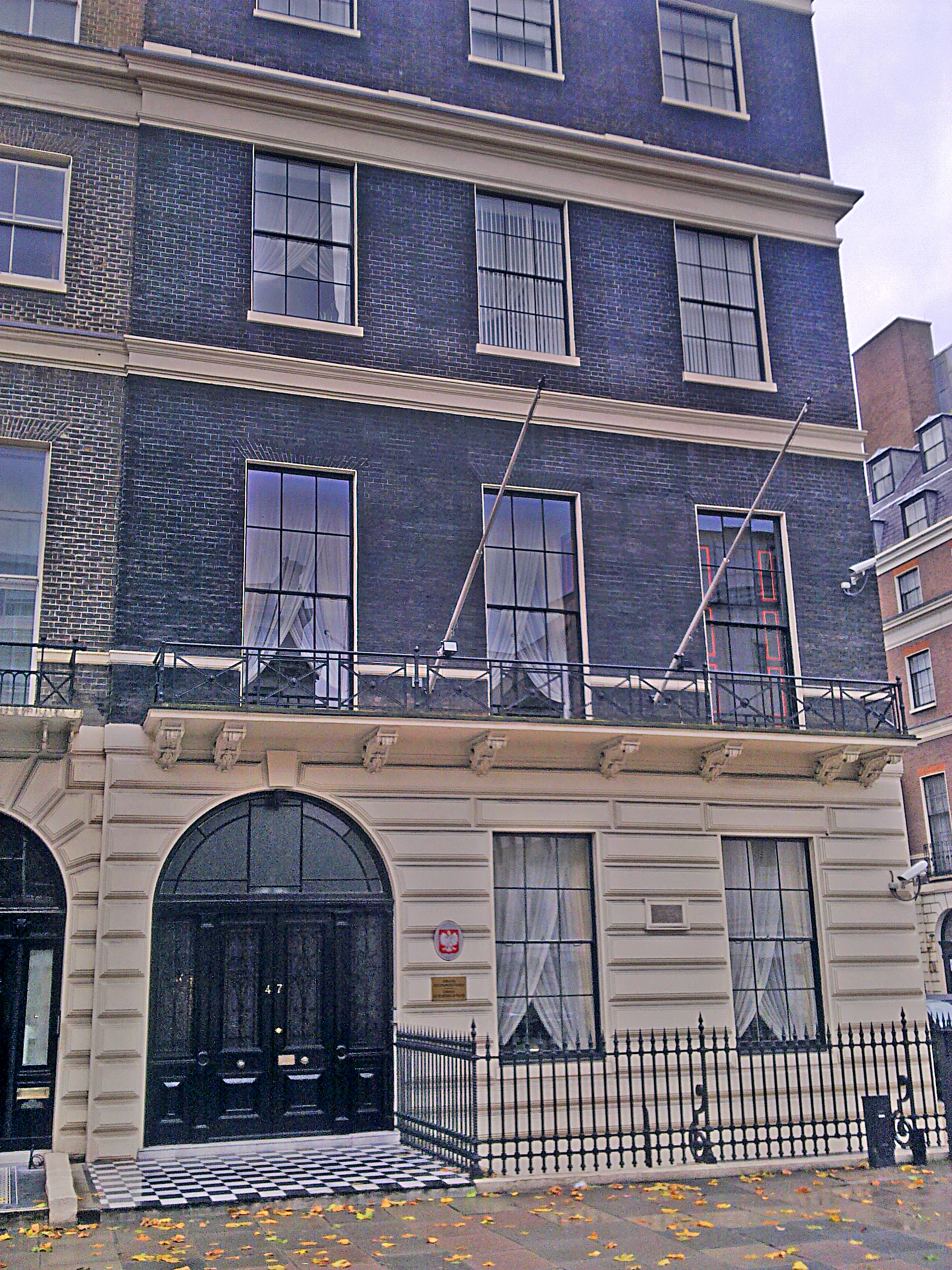
The embassy

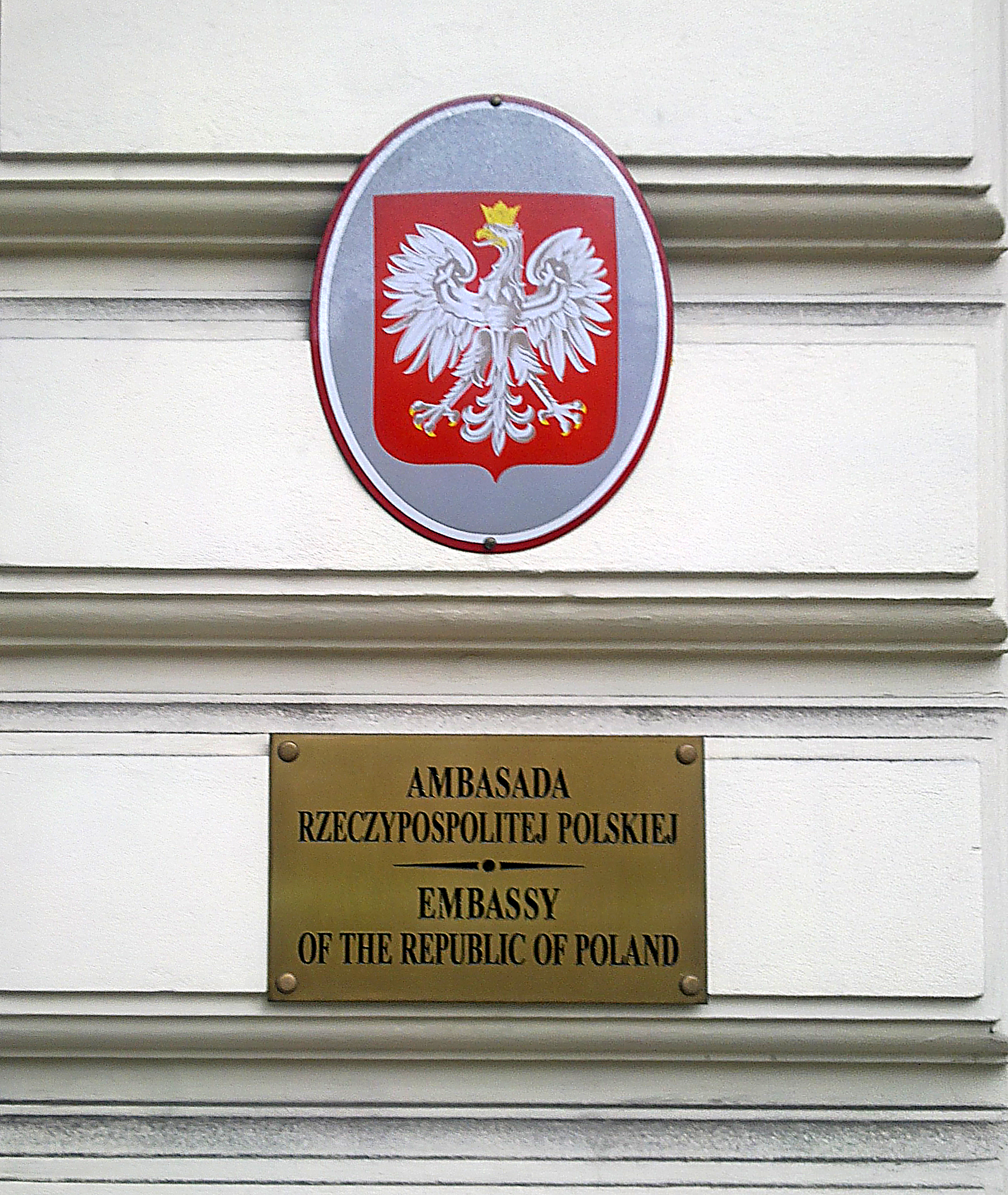
Plaques outside the embassy, one depicting the Coat of arms of Poland, the other in English and Polish

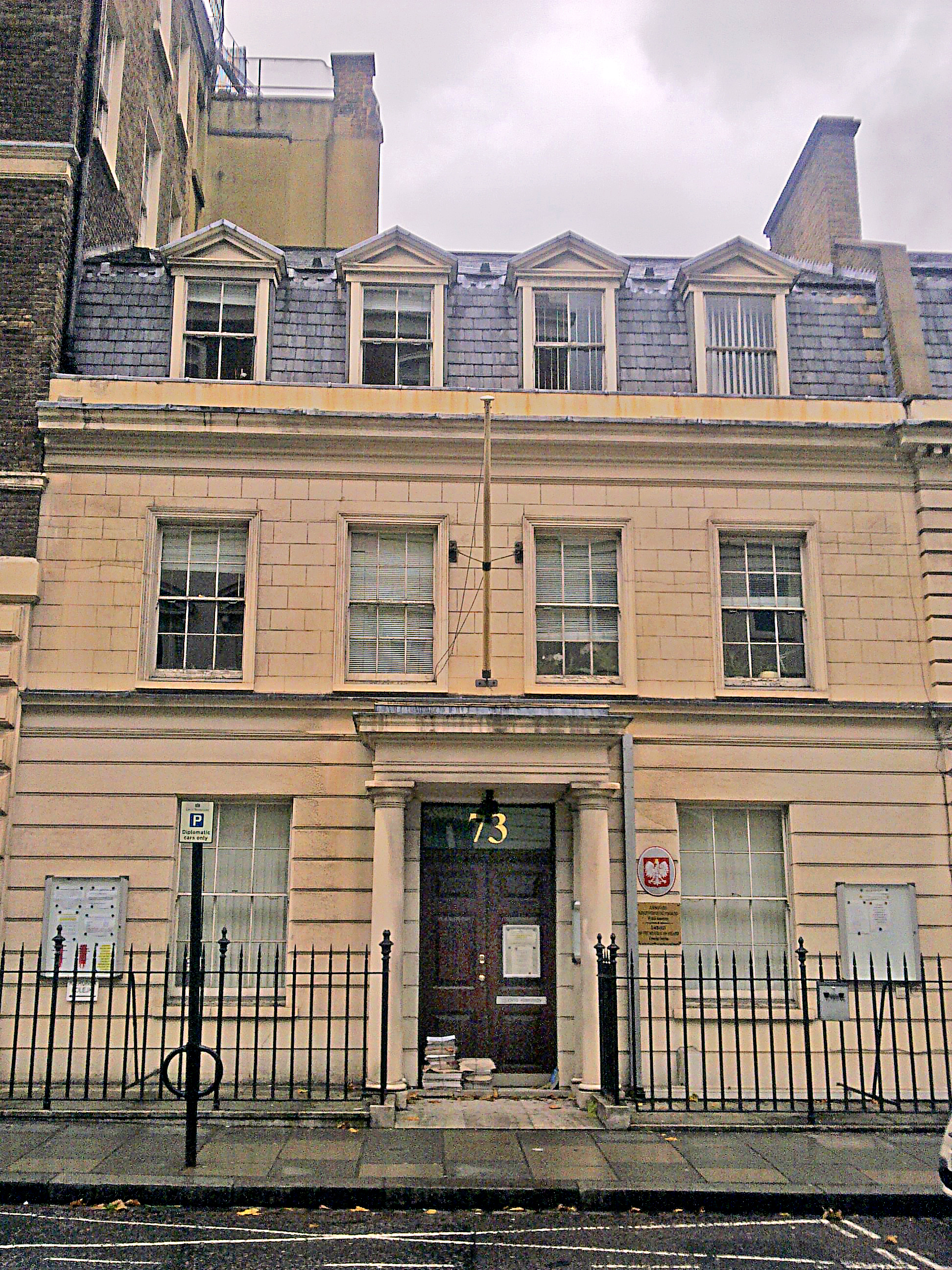
73 New Cavendish Street
