= Polish traditional clothing =

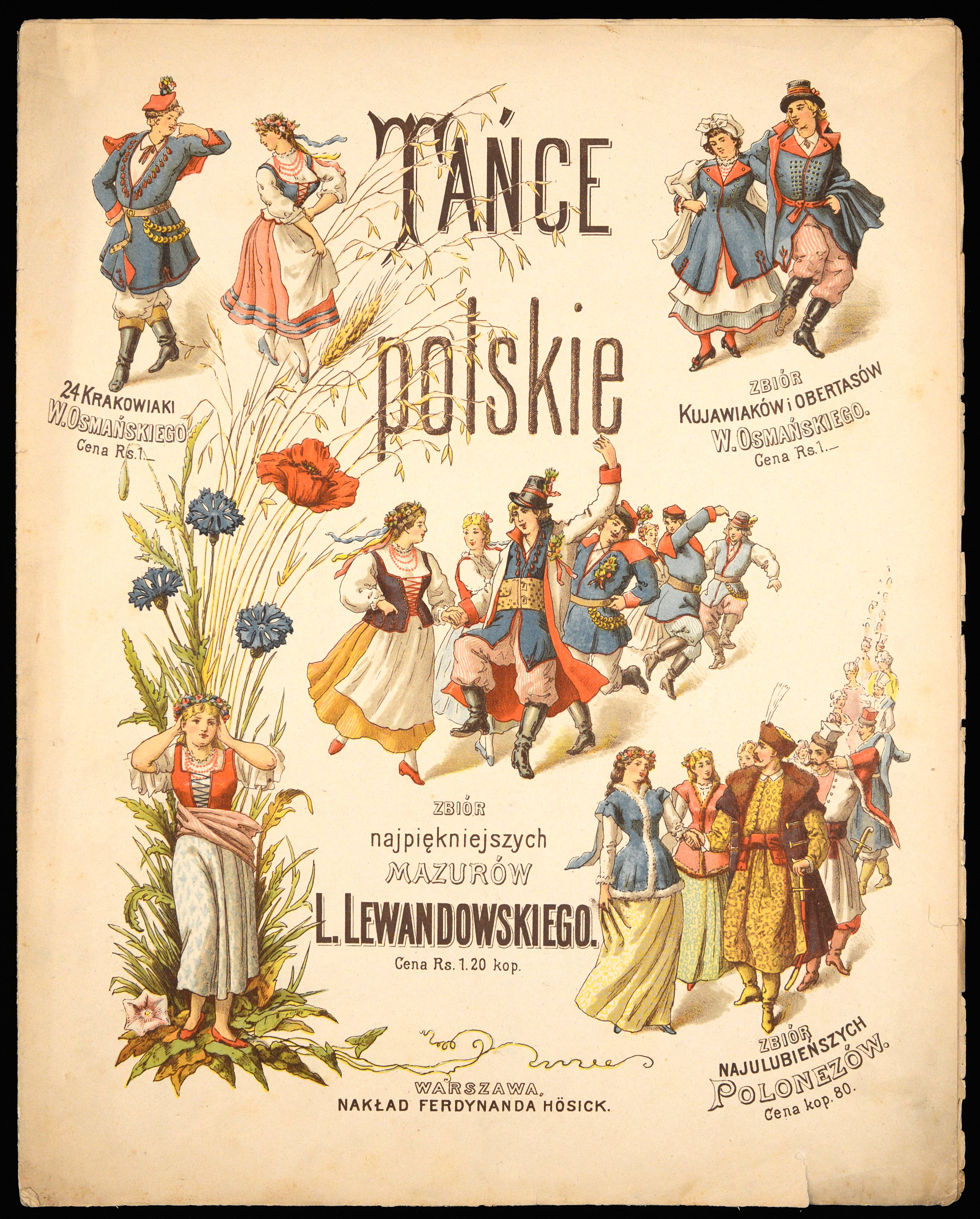
Polish national and folk costumes

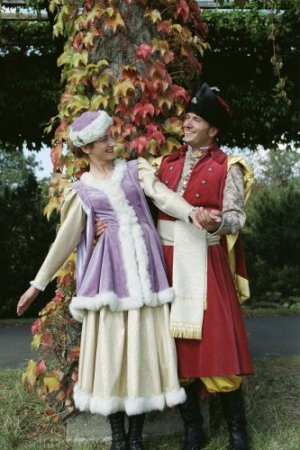
A couple wearing Polish national costumes

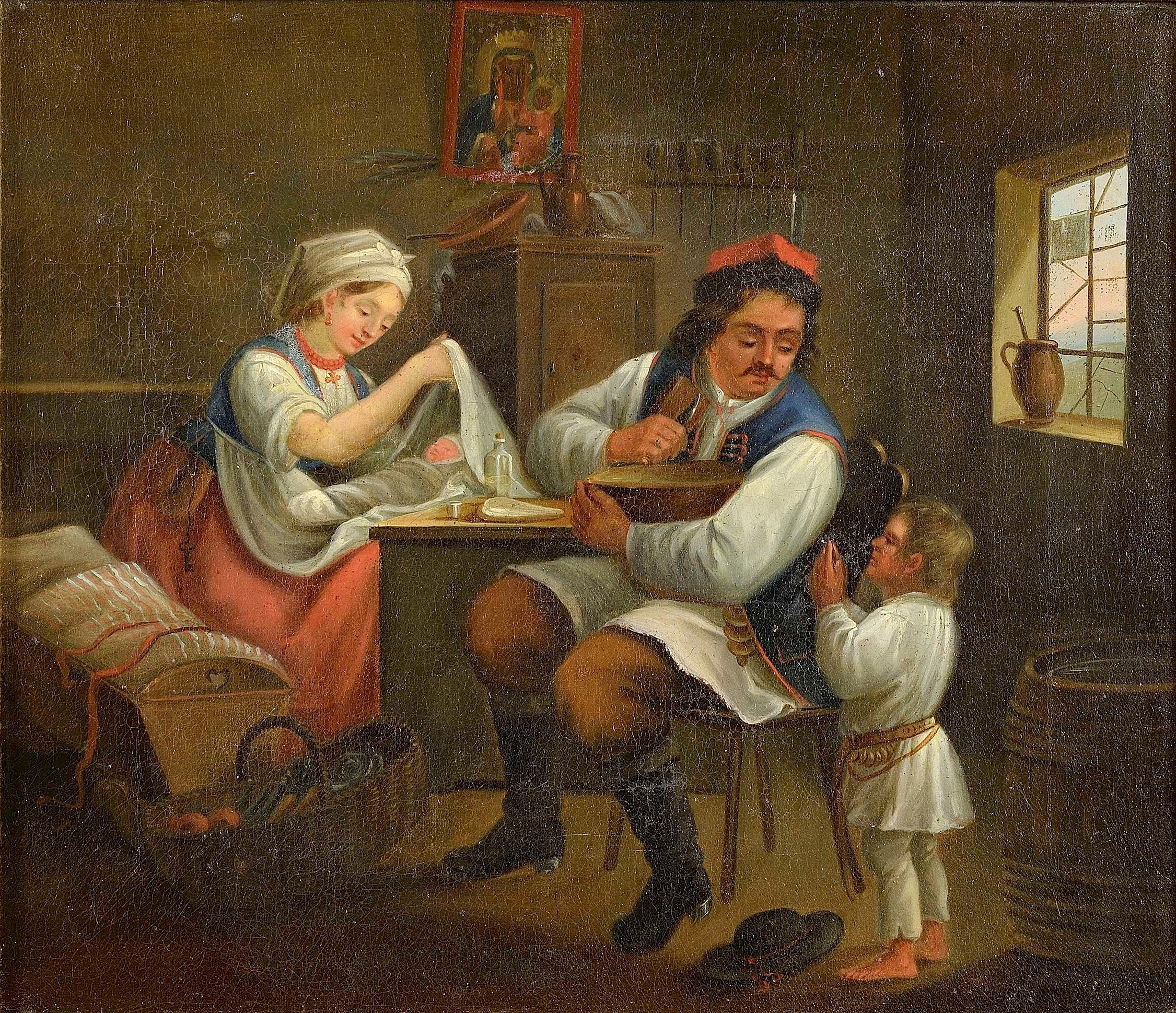
Cracovians

Polish traditional clothing can be divided into two categories, the peasant folk costumes (Polish: stroje ludowe) which vary by ethnographic group and the universal national costume (Polish: strój narodowy) based on the clothing of the nobility which is worn across all social classes ever since the Partitions. They are typically not worn in daily life but at folk festivals, folk weddings, religious holidays, harvest festivals and other special occasions.

== National costume ==
The Polish national costume originated from the clothing of the 18th-century Polish-Lithuanian nobility, which combined Western late medieval garments, old Slavic elements, and Eastern fashions (Hungarian, Persian, Turkish, Tatar, and Cossack). At the beginning of the 18th century, Poland entered a fashion conflict known as "the War of the Kontusz and Frock," in which the Polish nobility was split between adopting Western fashion and keeping Old Polish clothing. After the partitions, this made the Old Polish costume an important symbol of Polish identity, leading to it being frequently mentioned in Polish literature and playing an important role in the Polish national epic Pan Tadeusz.

By the 19th century, the Polish national costume had become widespread among all social classes and was even adopted by other ethnicities, such as Germans and Jews. This was particularly true in Galicia, where Austrian authorities did not suppress Polish identity. Wearing the national attire continued to be fashionable during the Second Polish Republic, serving as a stereotypical symbol of Polish identity in international media. Although it was later suppressed in the Polish People's Republic due to its aristocratic origins, the film adaptations of Henryk Sienkiewicz's Trilogy successfully renewed public interest in it.

Other than being worn during important celebrations, it is worn when dancing the polonaise and the mazur and by bractwa kurkowe, burgher societies dedicated to the defence of their cities.

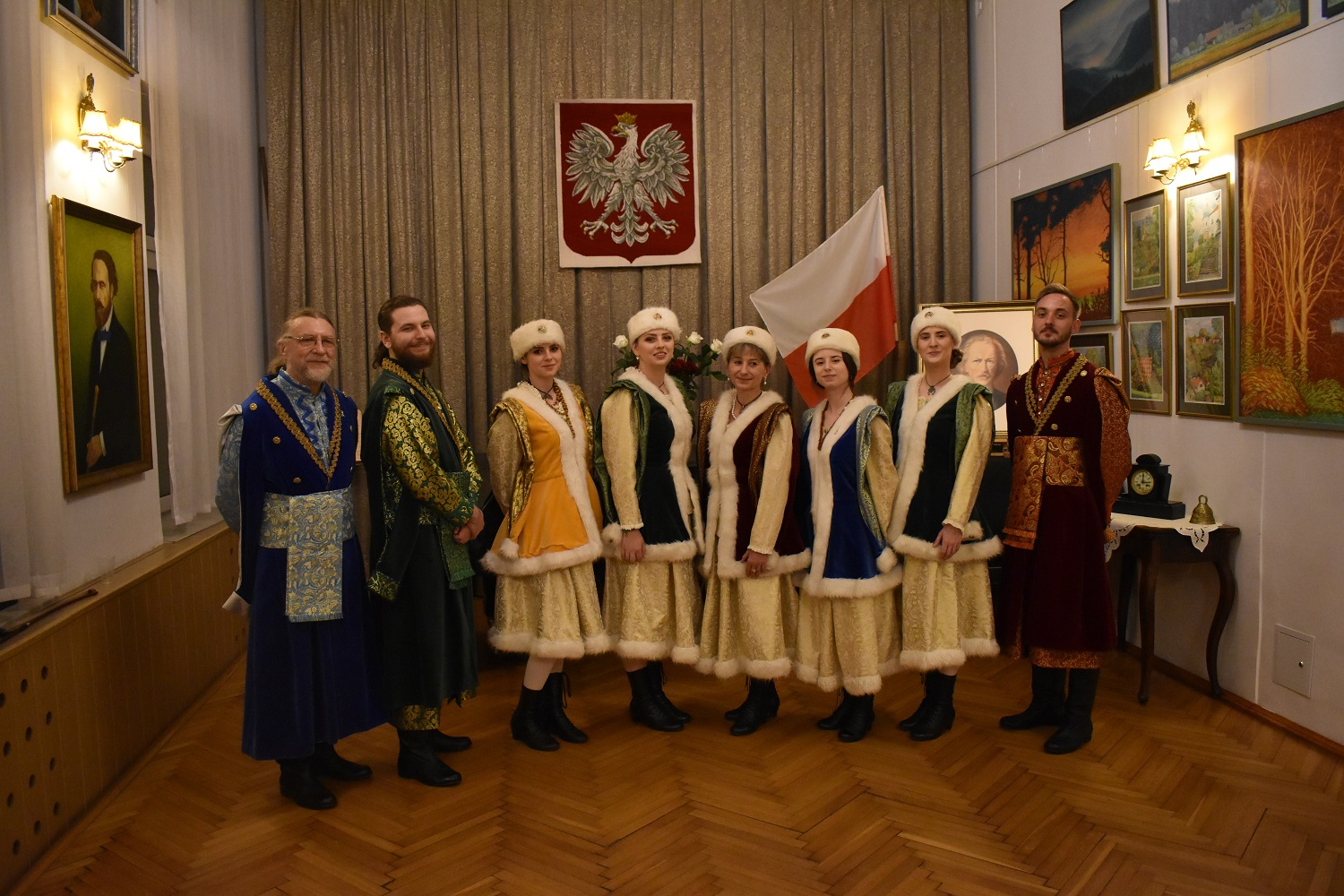
National costumes

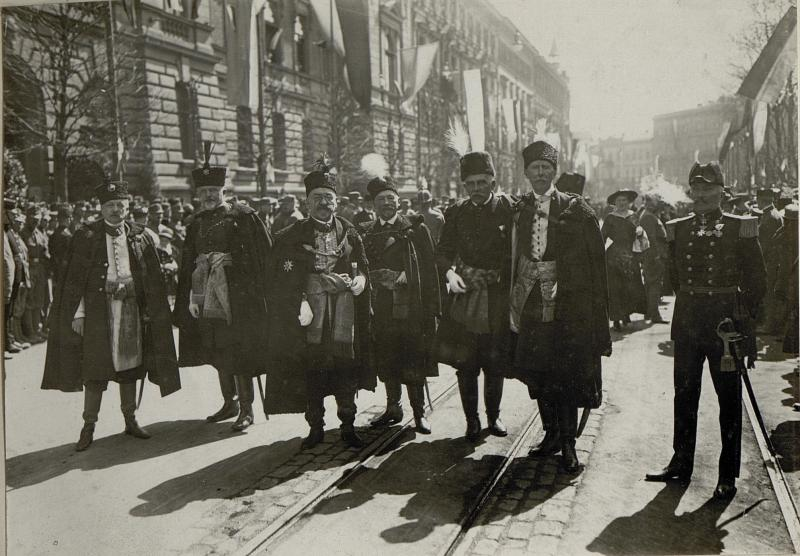
Emperor Karl I and Zita next to members of the Kraków Bractwo Kurkowe

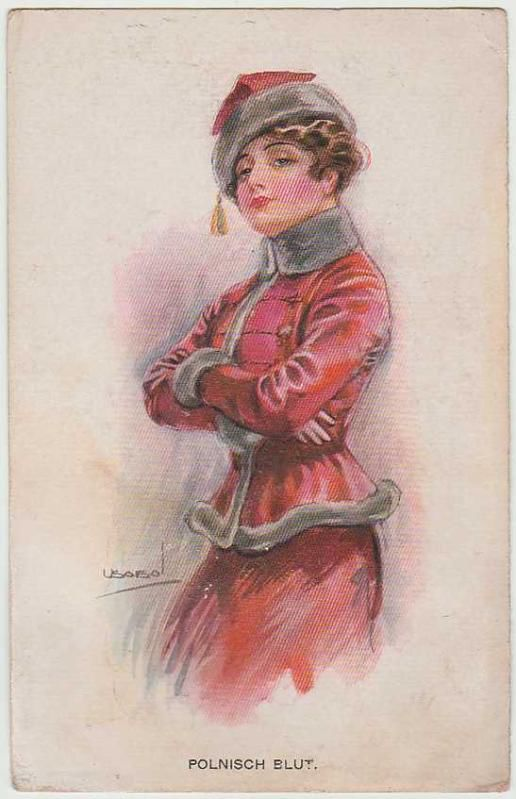
Postcard from 1920

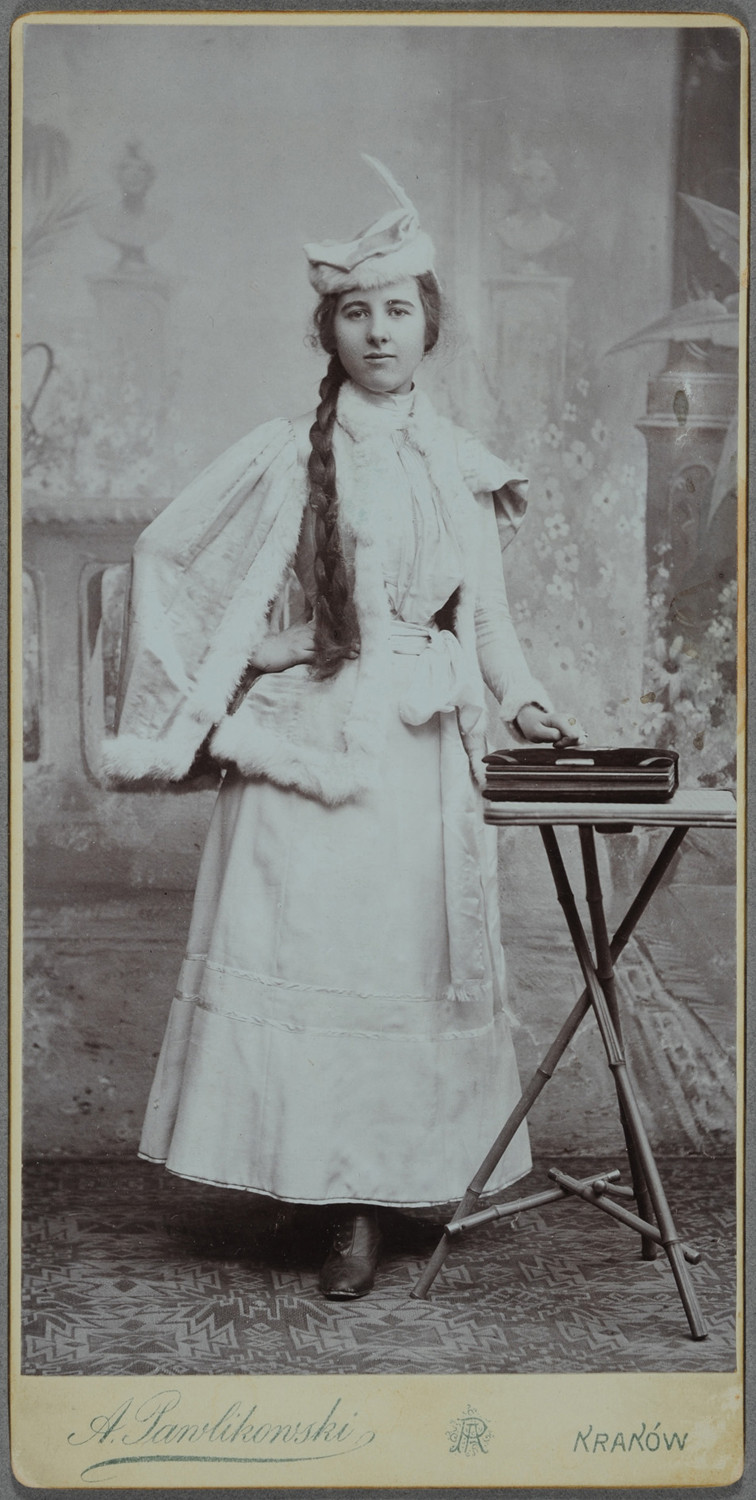
A young girl in a Polish national costume

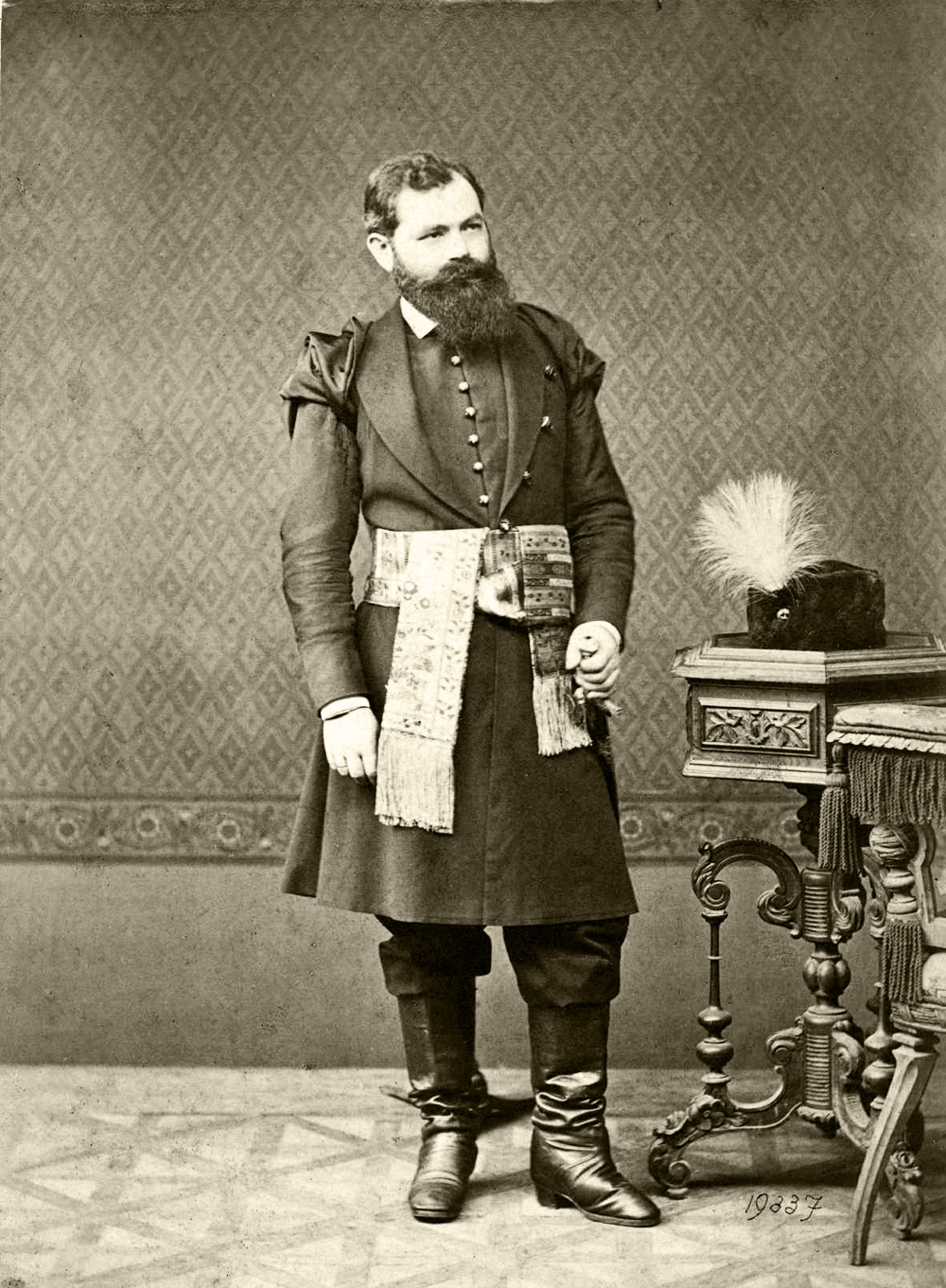
Jewish lawyer Bernard Goldman

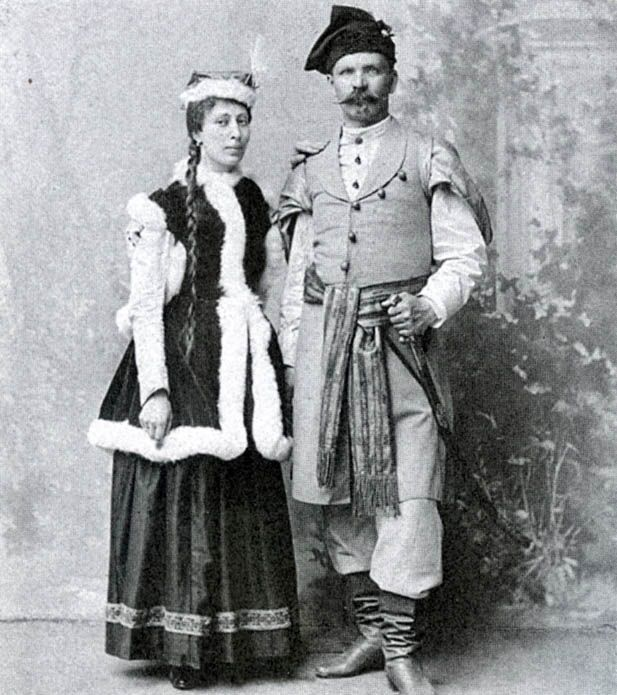
Polish gentry

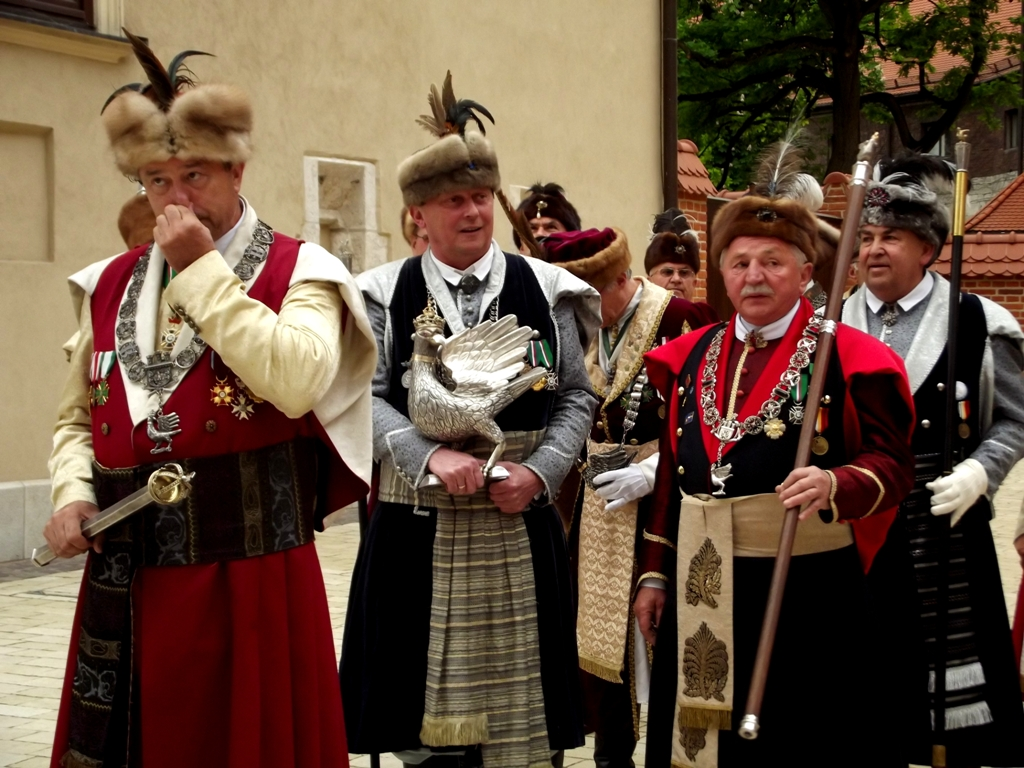
Kraków Bractwo Kurkowe

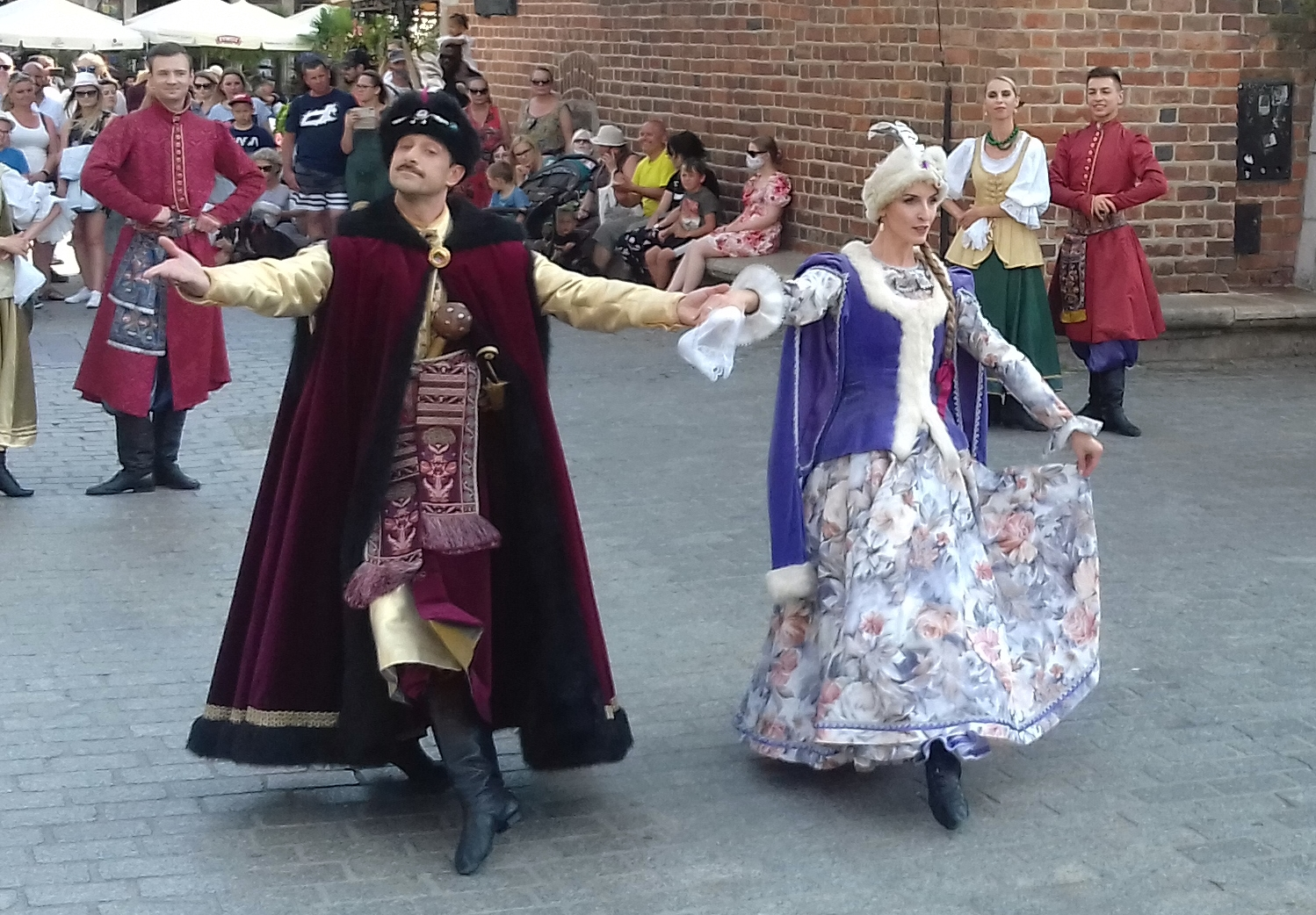
Cracovia Danza

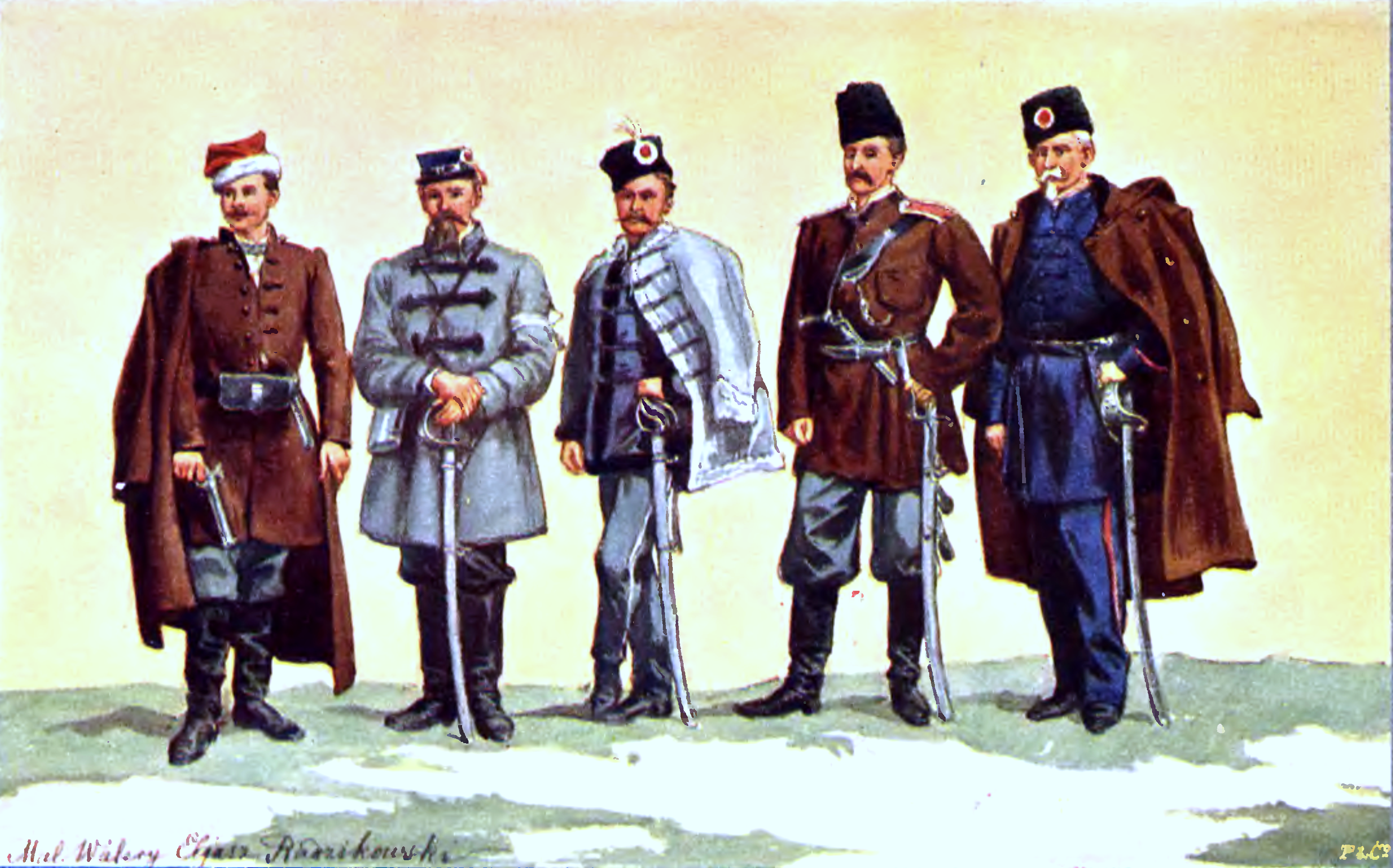
Polish insurgents 1863. The Polish uniforms of the January Uprising were heavily inspired by Polish national costumes

== Folk costumes ==
The period of greatest development of folk costumes happened in the second half of the 19th and early 20th centuries, when the emancipation of peasants, the development of the commodity economy, and industry led to an increase in the wealth of peasants. During the interwar period, folk costumes began to be treated as ceremonial clothing, worn on special occasions, rather than as everyday wear. The appearance of the costume depended on the Polish region where it originated, the climatic conditions, the type of economy, socio-economic relations, and the history of the place where it was created. Inspiration for folk costumes often came from noble and bourgeois costumes, as well as military uniforms. European fashions of the Baroque and Renaissance periods also had an influence. The decoration of the costume depended on the wealth of the ethnographic groups and the individual owner. Some groups with more distinct like Silesians, Gorals or Kashubians may wear their folk costumes more often, meanwhile other groups which lost their sense of ethnographic distinctiveness may do so rarely. Polish folk costumes are usually associated with different ethnographic groups of the Polish nation. The division below will be based on Polish historical regions.

=== Lesser Poland ===
==== Lowland and foothill ethnographic groups ====
- Cracovians (sometimes considered a national costume)
- Lachs, most notably the Sącz Lachs
- Lublinians
- Sandomierzans
- Pogorzans
- Biłgoraj-Tarnogród peasants
- Lasovians

==== Carpathian ethnic groups (mixed ethnogenesis with Valachs) ====
- Gorals
- Lemkos (East Slavs)
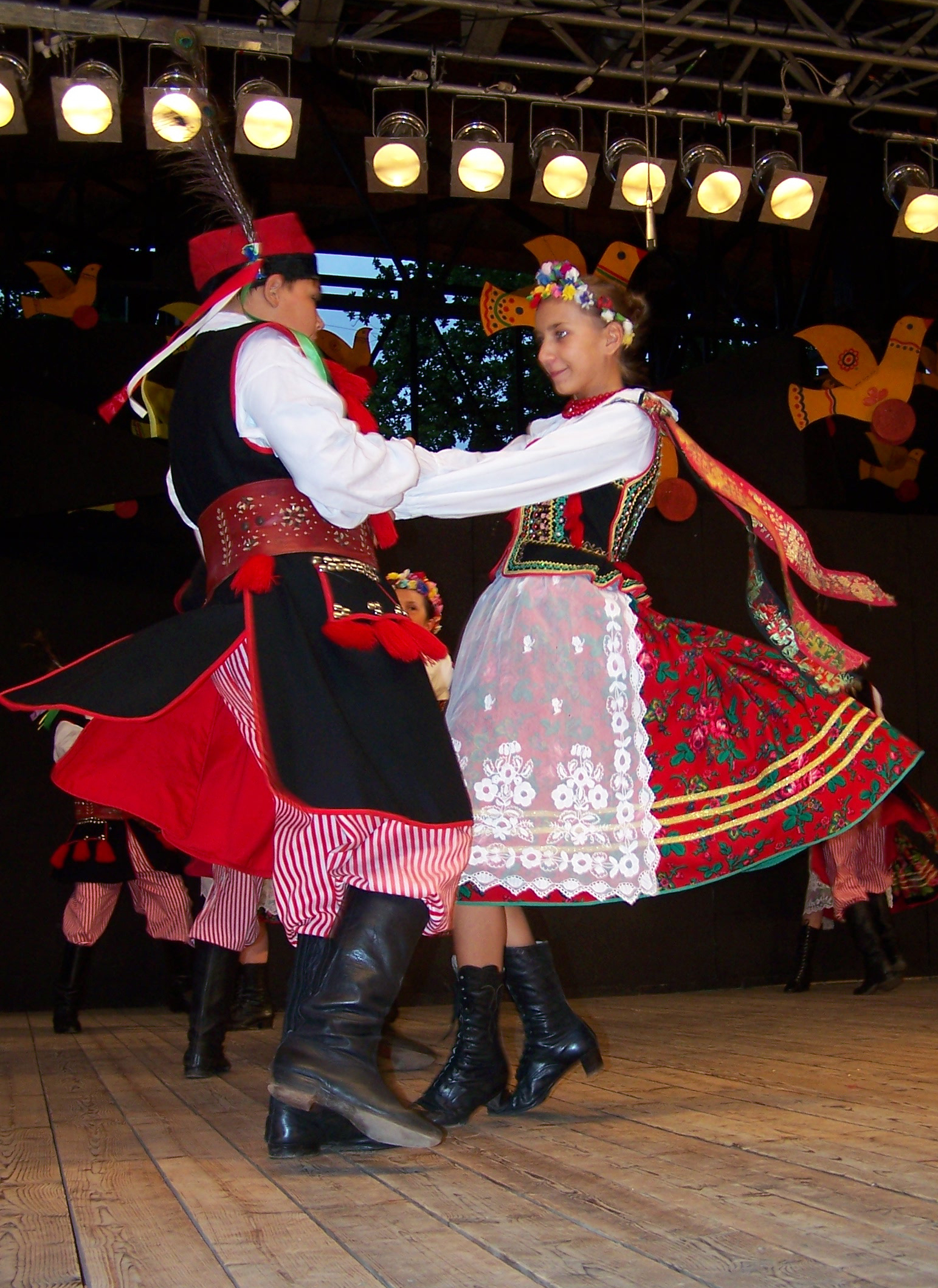
Western Cracovians

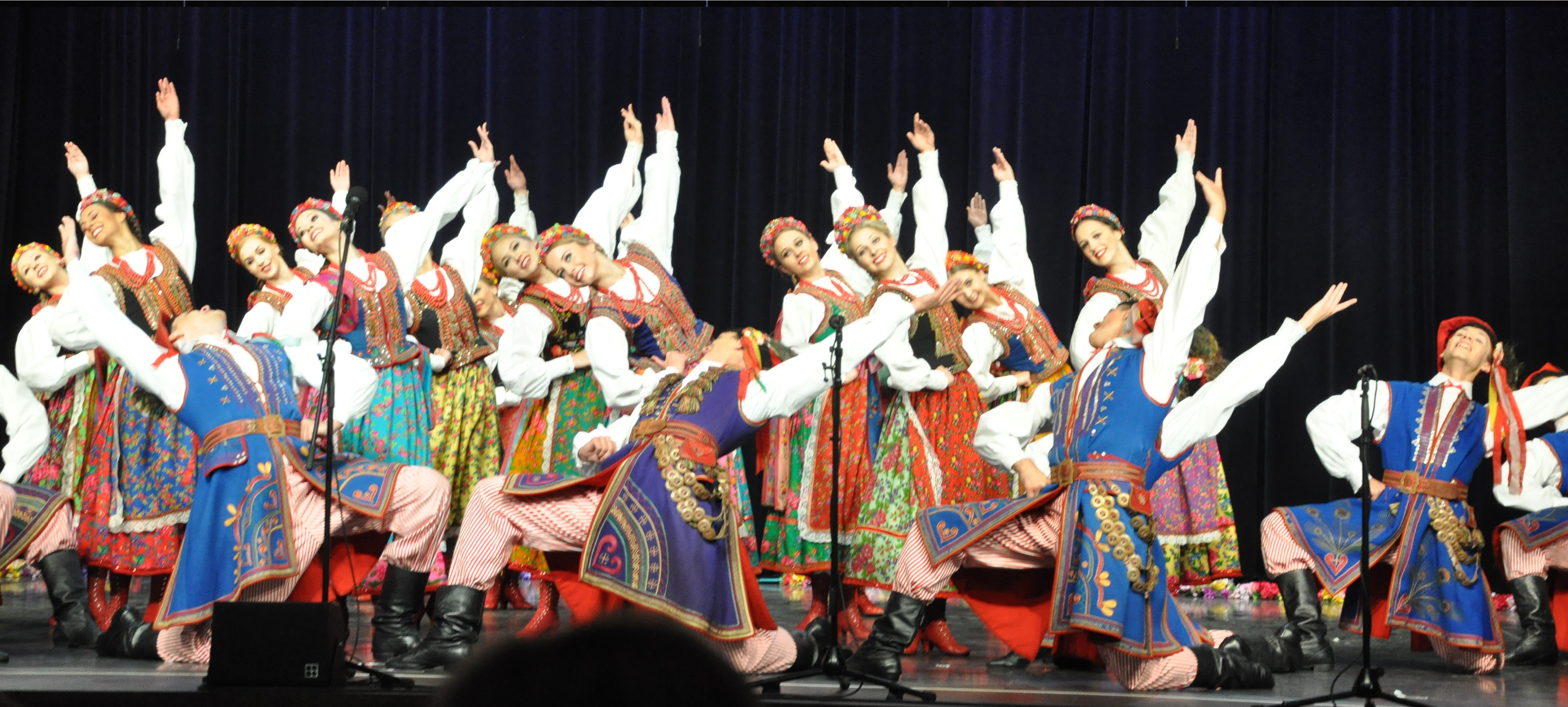
Western Cracovians

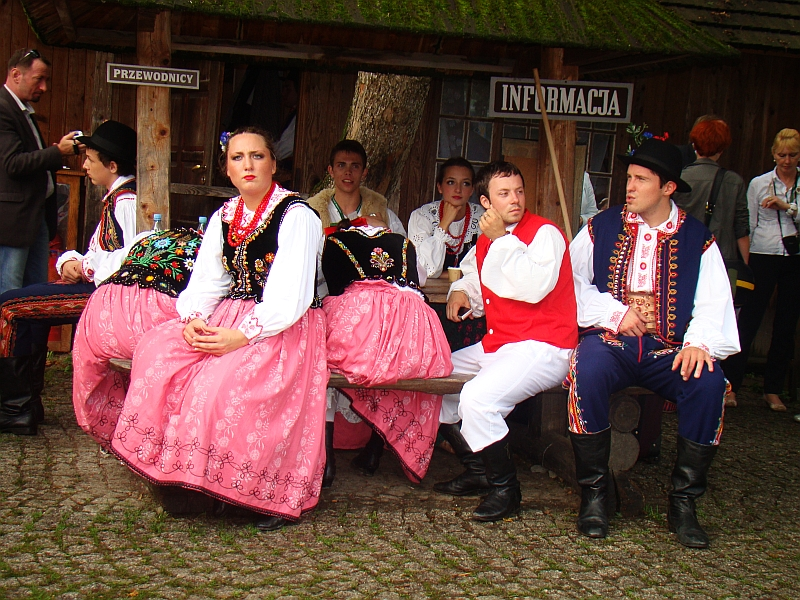
Sącz Lachs

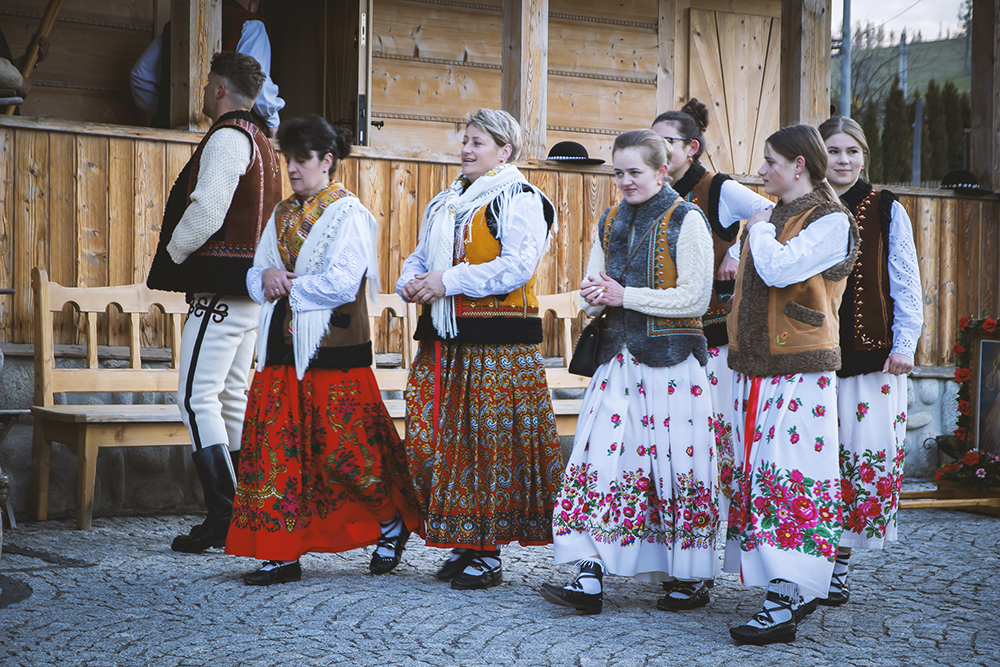
Gorals from Podhale

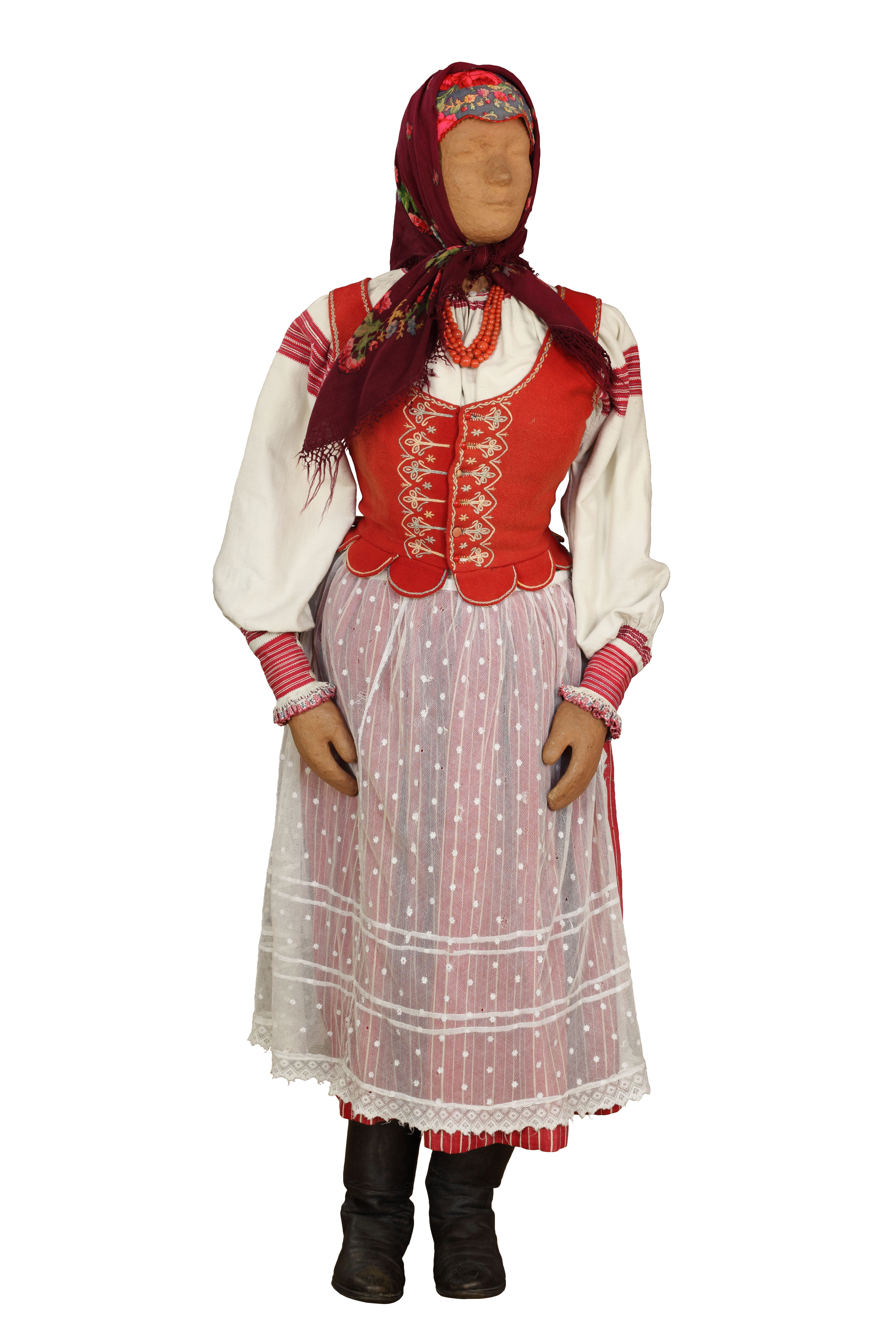
Female Goral folk costume from Szczawnica

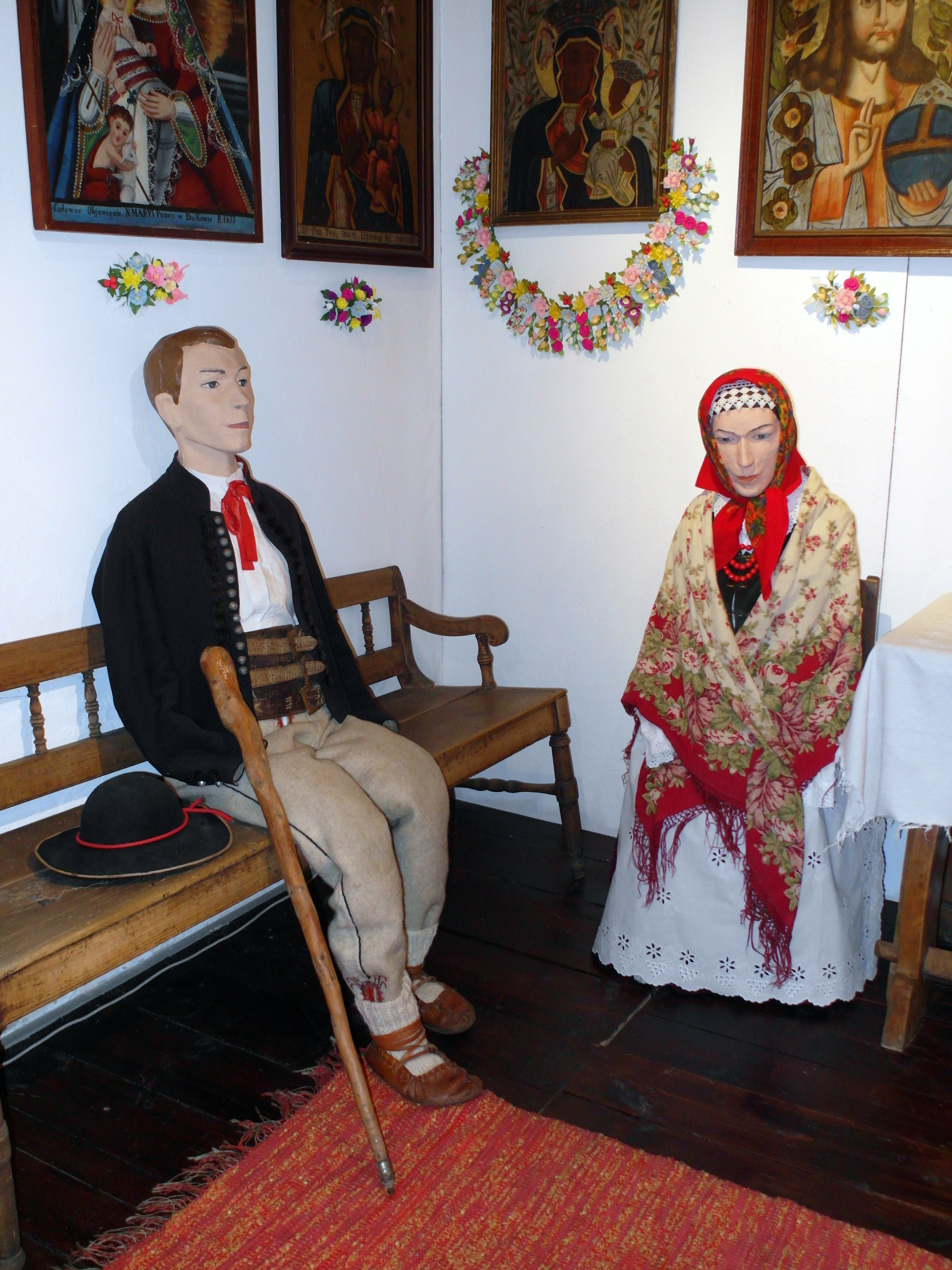
Żywiec Gorals

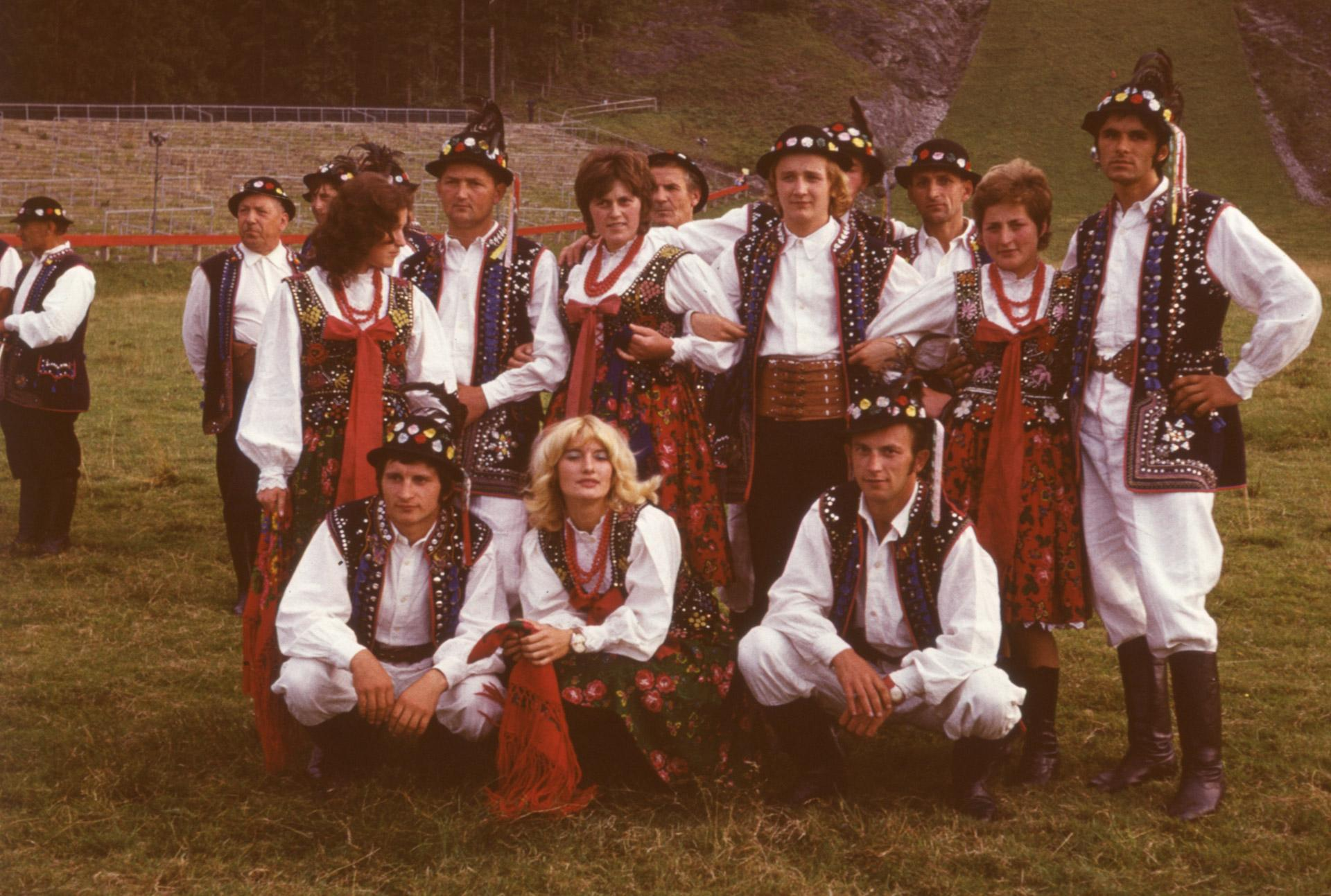
Limanowa Lachs

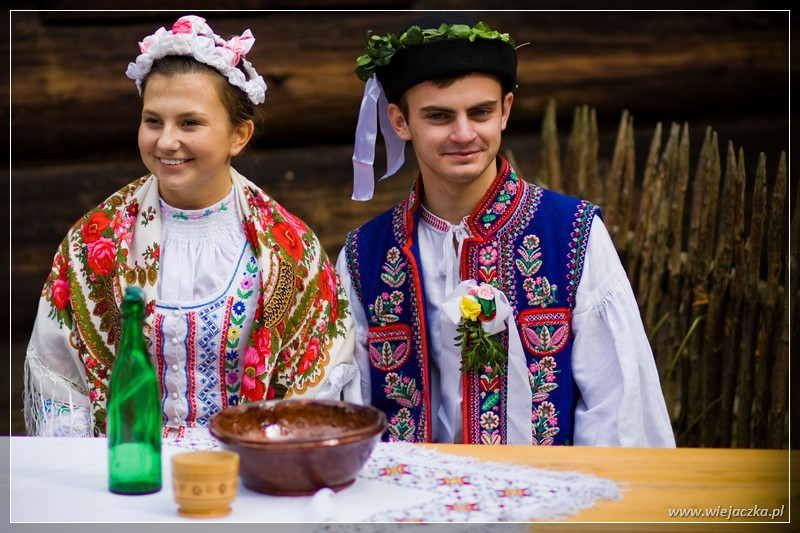
Lemko couple

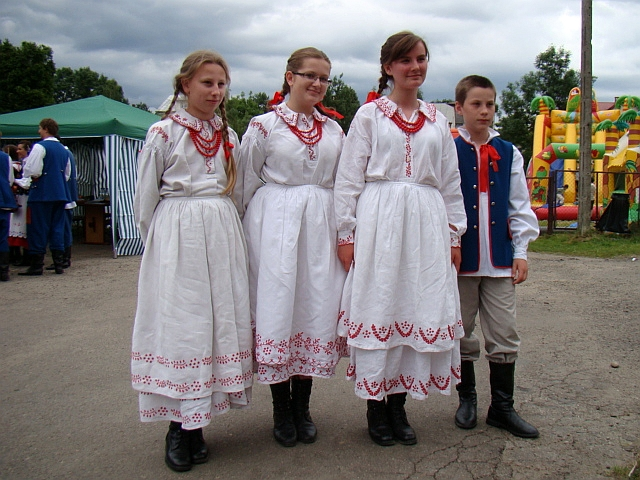
Lasovians

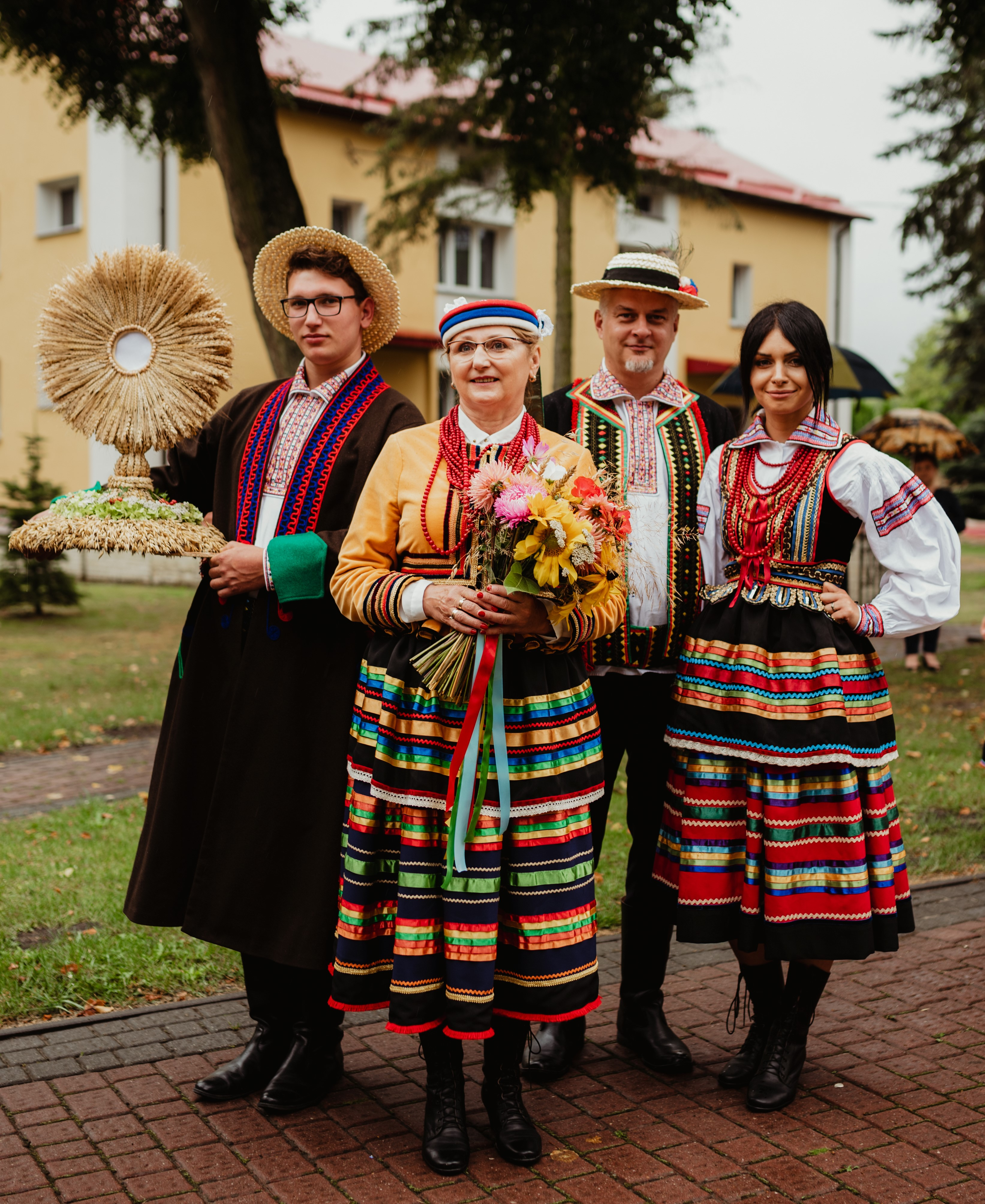
Lublinians from Krzczonów

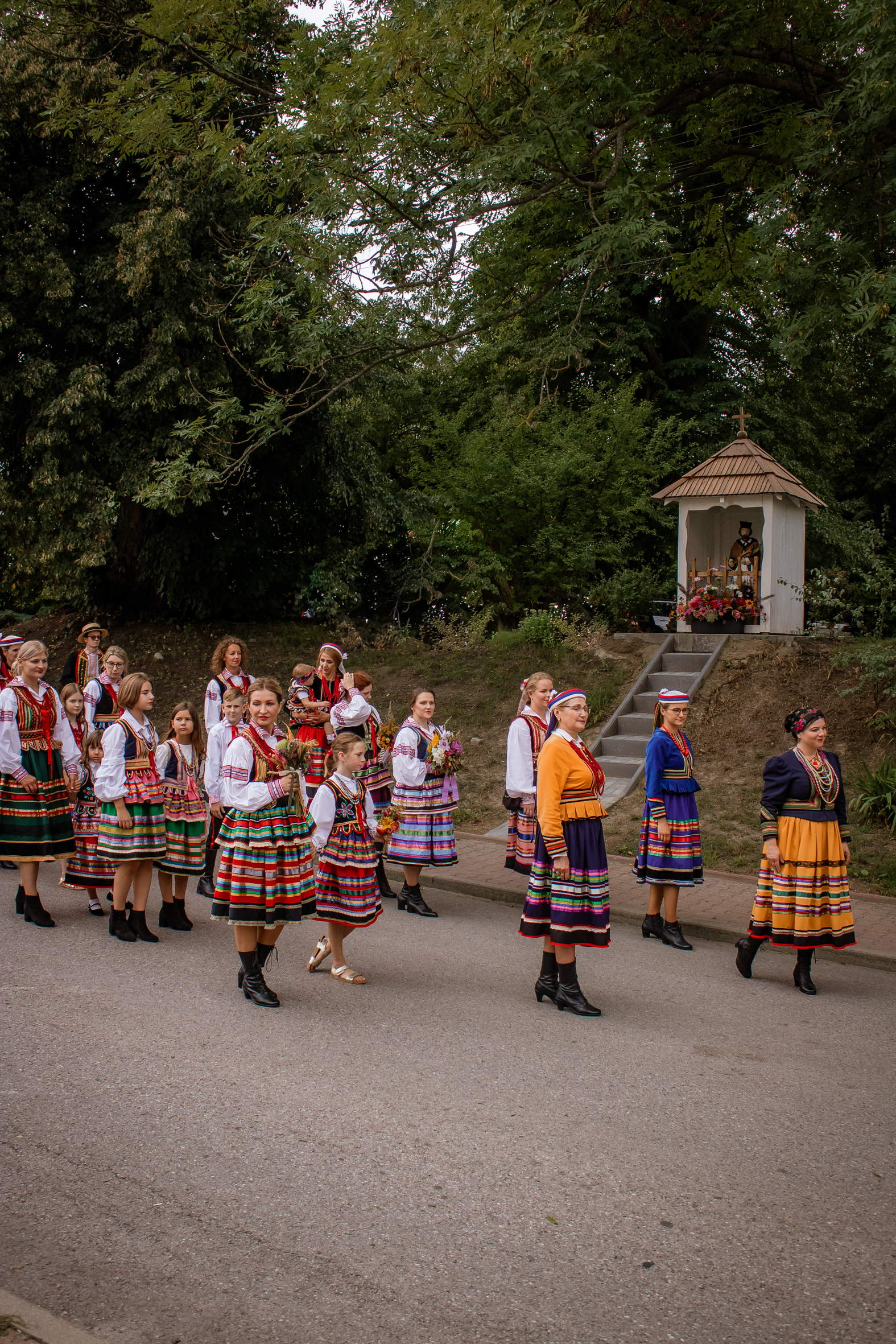
Lublinians from Krzczonów

=== Red Ruthenia ===
- Resovians (peasants from around Rzeszów)
- Pogorzans
- Biłgoraj-Tarnogród peasants
- Costumes of Ruthenian peasants (East Slavs)

==== Carpathian ethnic groups ====
- Lemkos (East Slavs)
- Boykos (East Slavs)
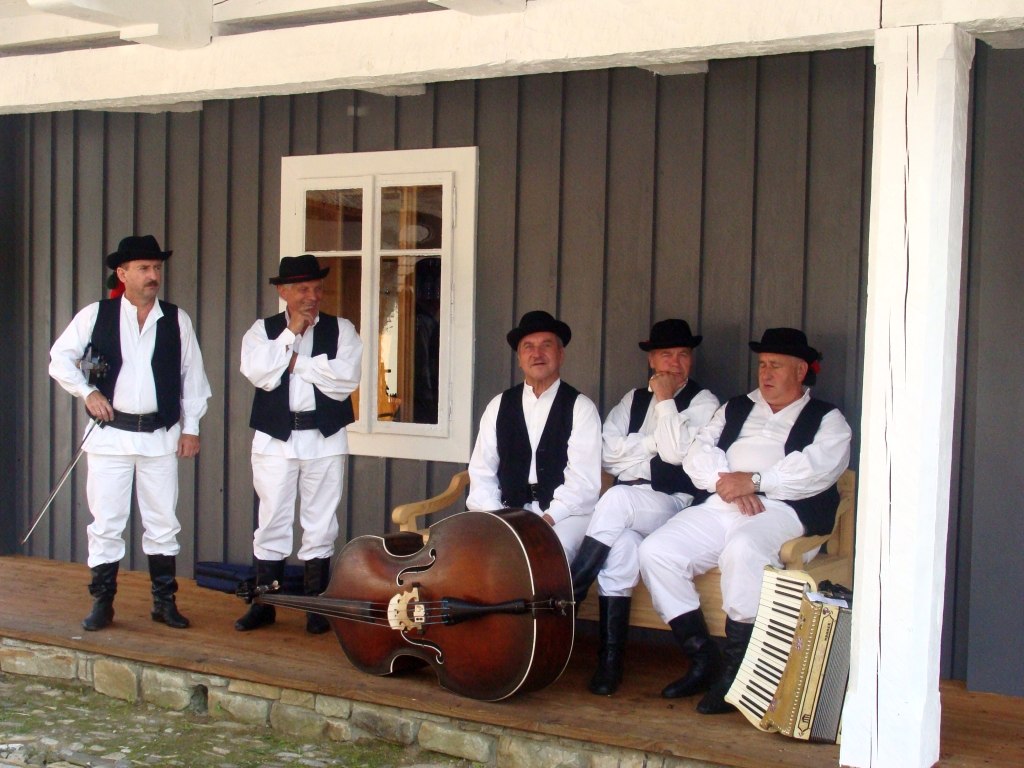
Uplanders

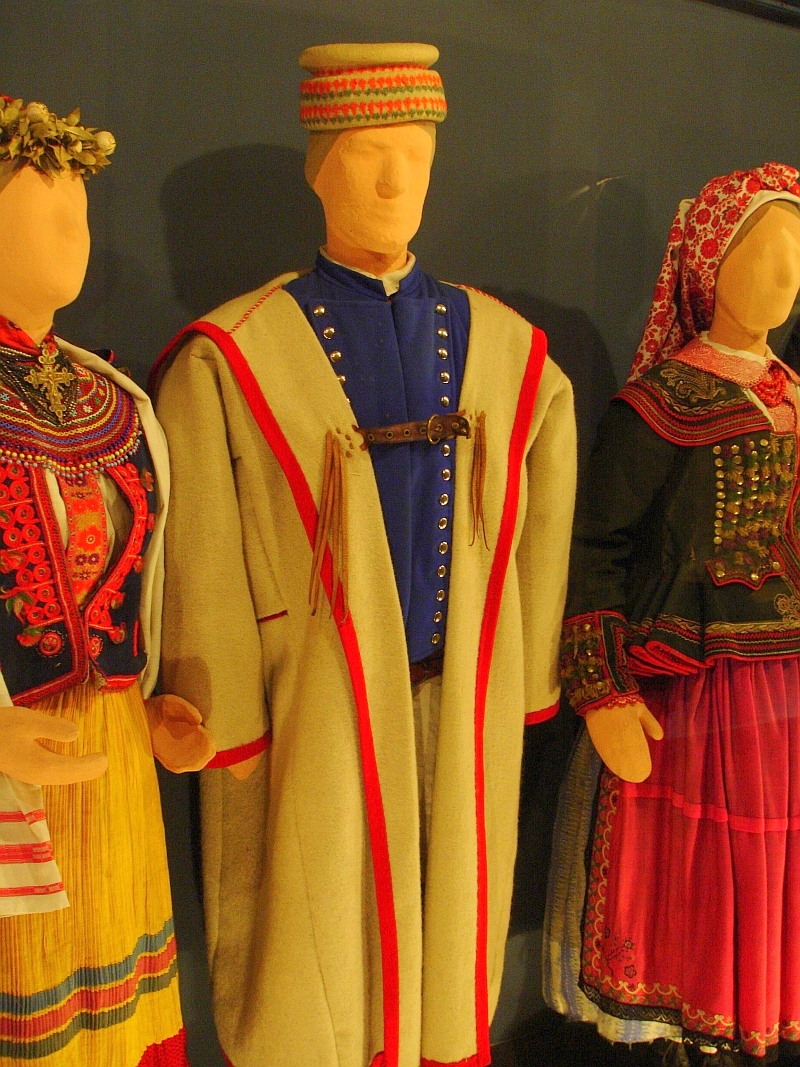
Uplanders

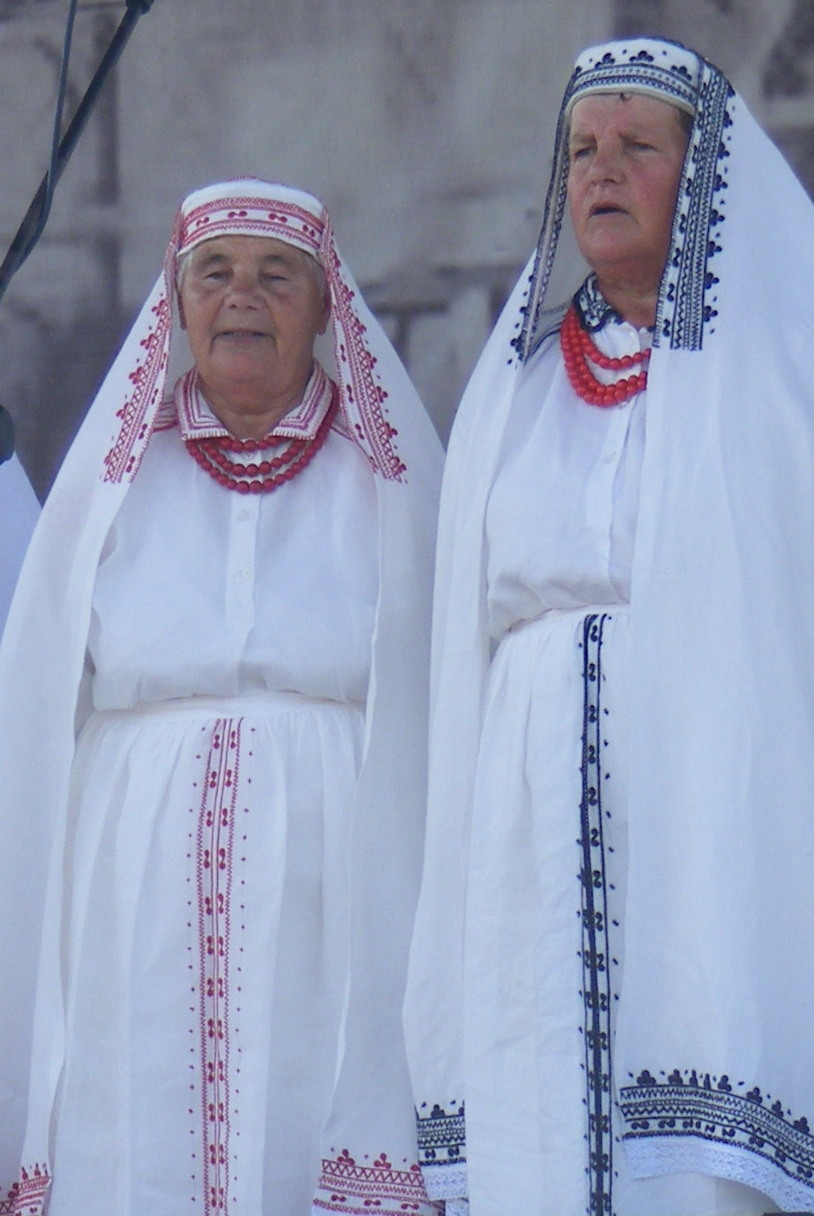
Biłograj-Tarnogród

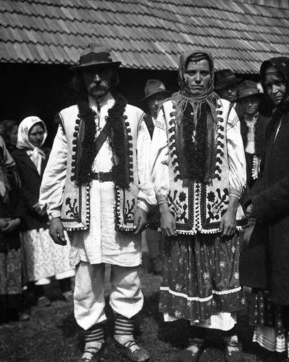
Boykos

=== Silesia ===
- Bytomians-Górzanie folk costumes
- Pszczyna group
- Raciborzans
- Opolans
- Cieszyn Vlachs
- Cieszyn Lachs
- Silesian Gorals
- Lower Silesia (often German in origin or created later)
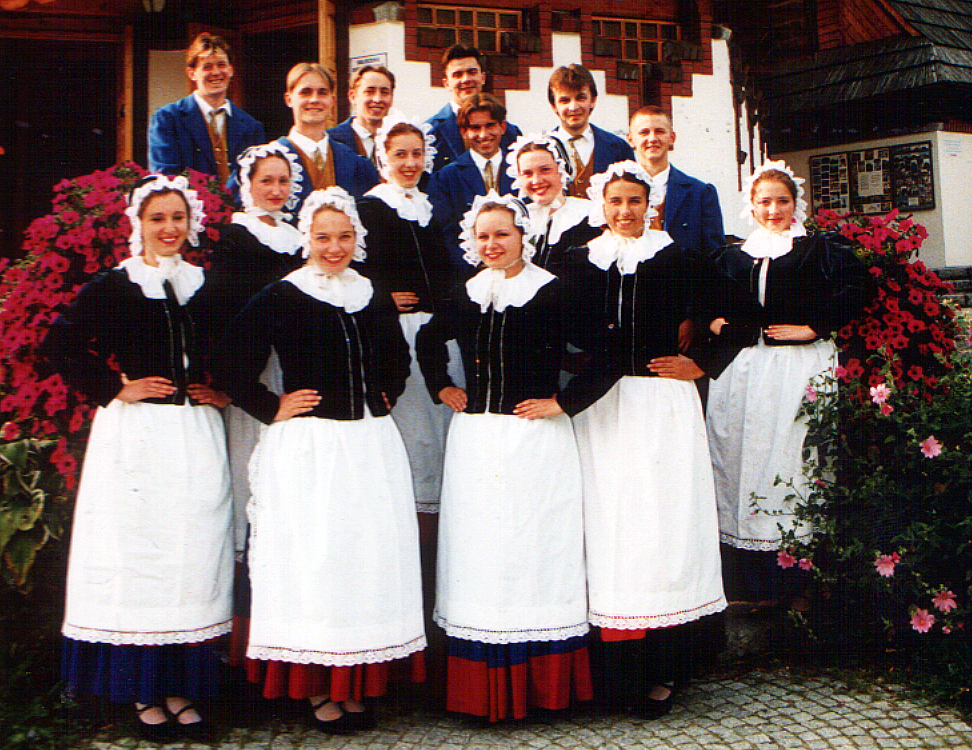
Lower Silesia

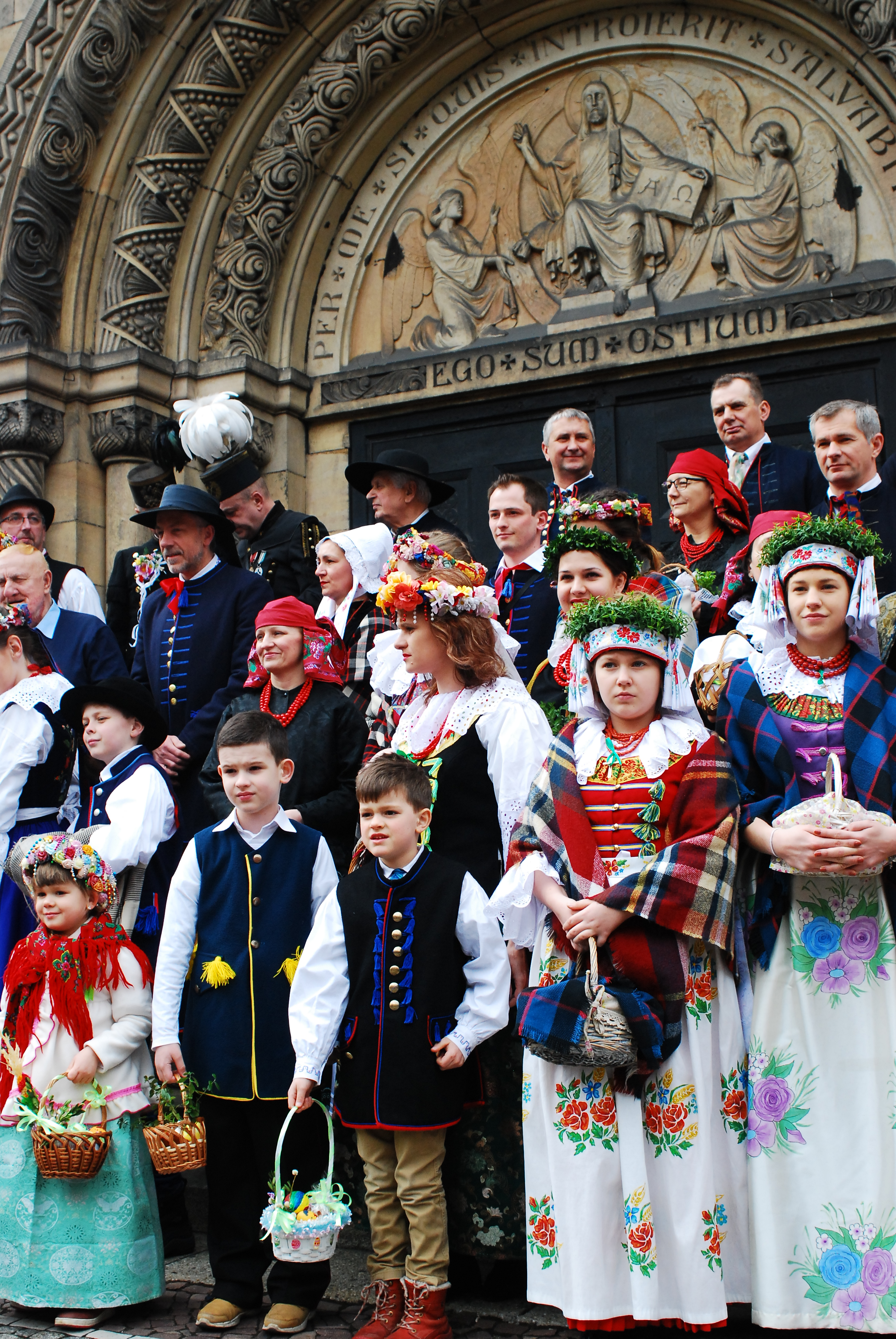
Górzanie

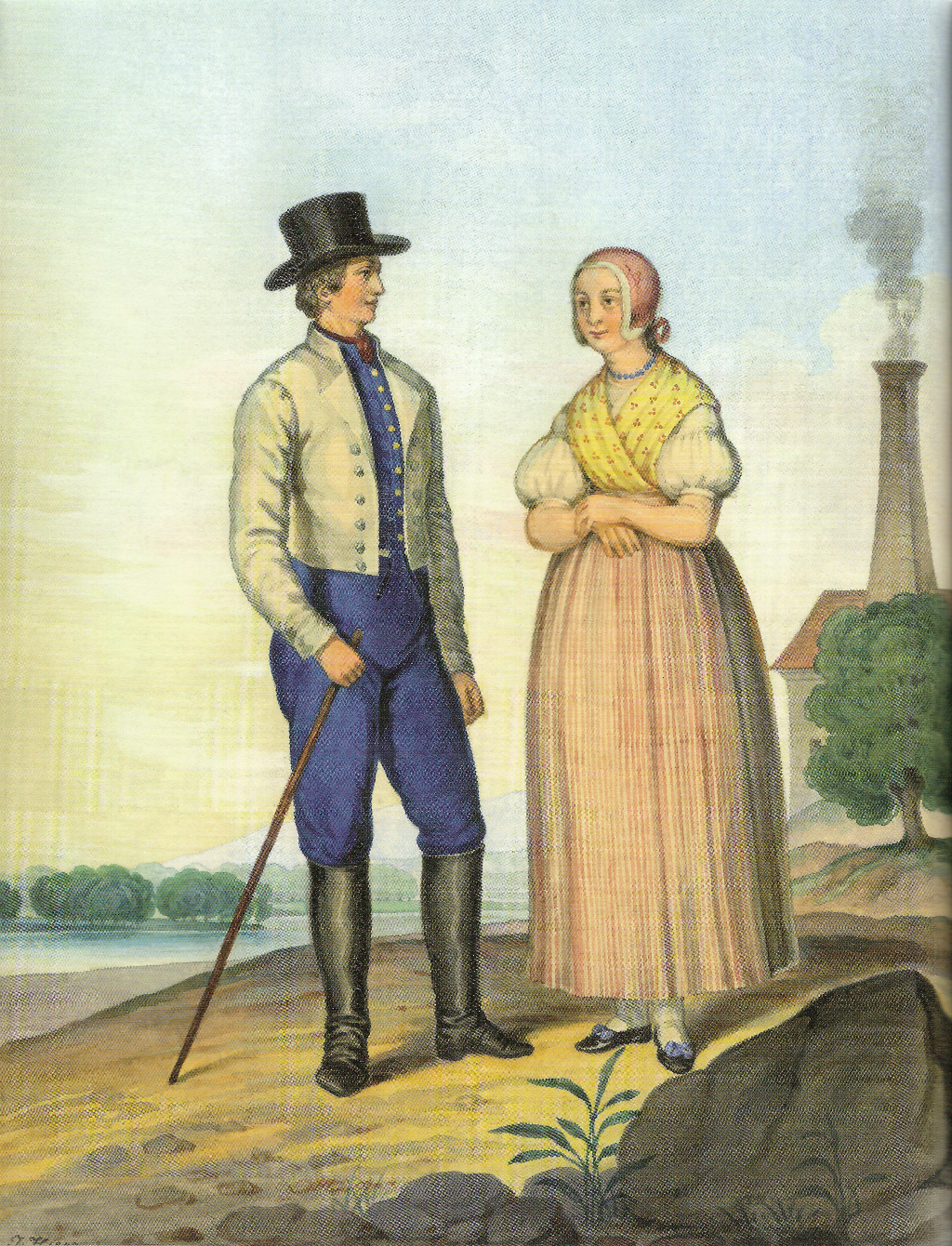
Silesian Lachs

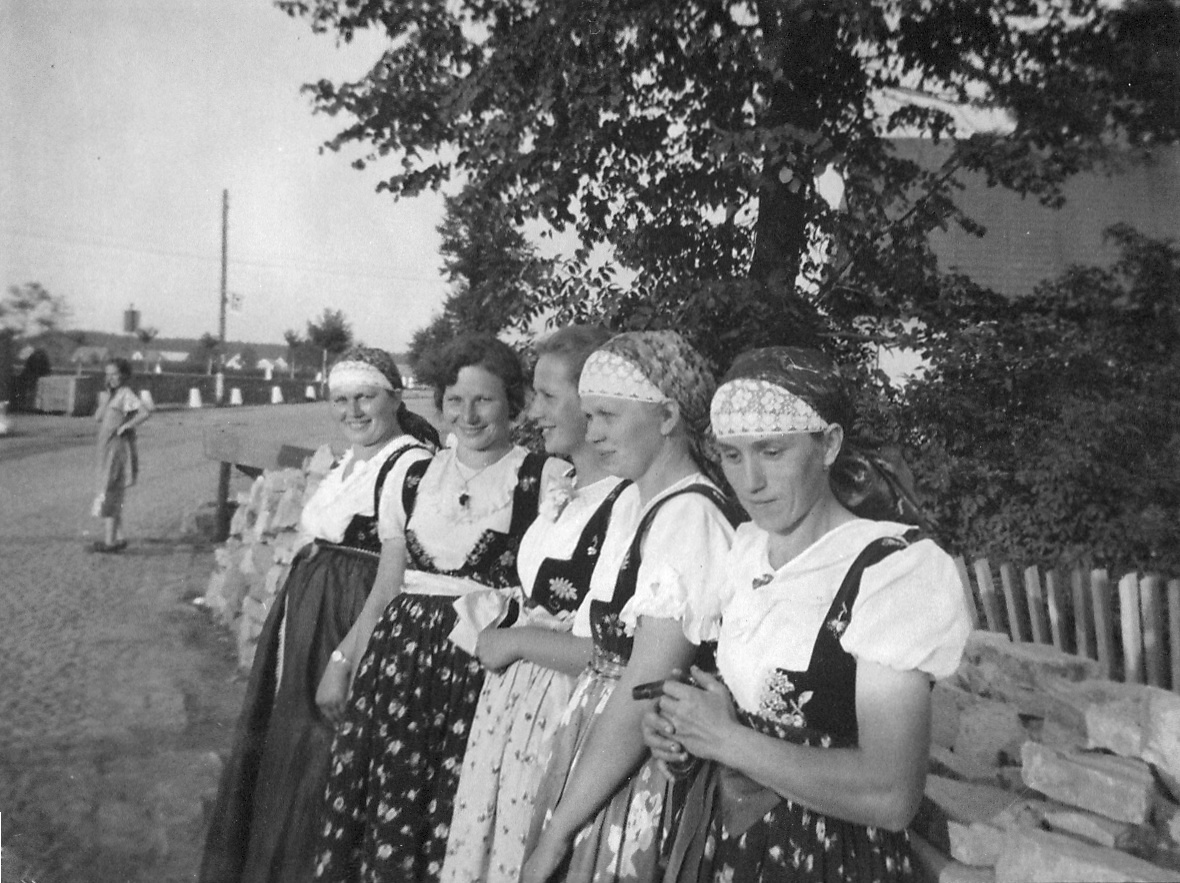
Cieszyn Vlachs

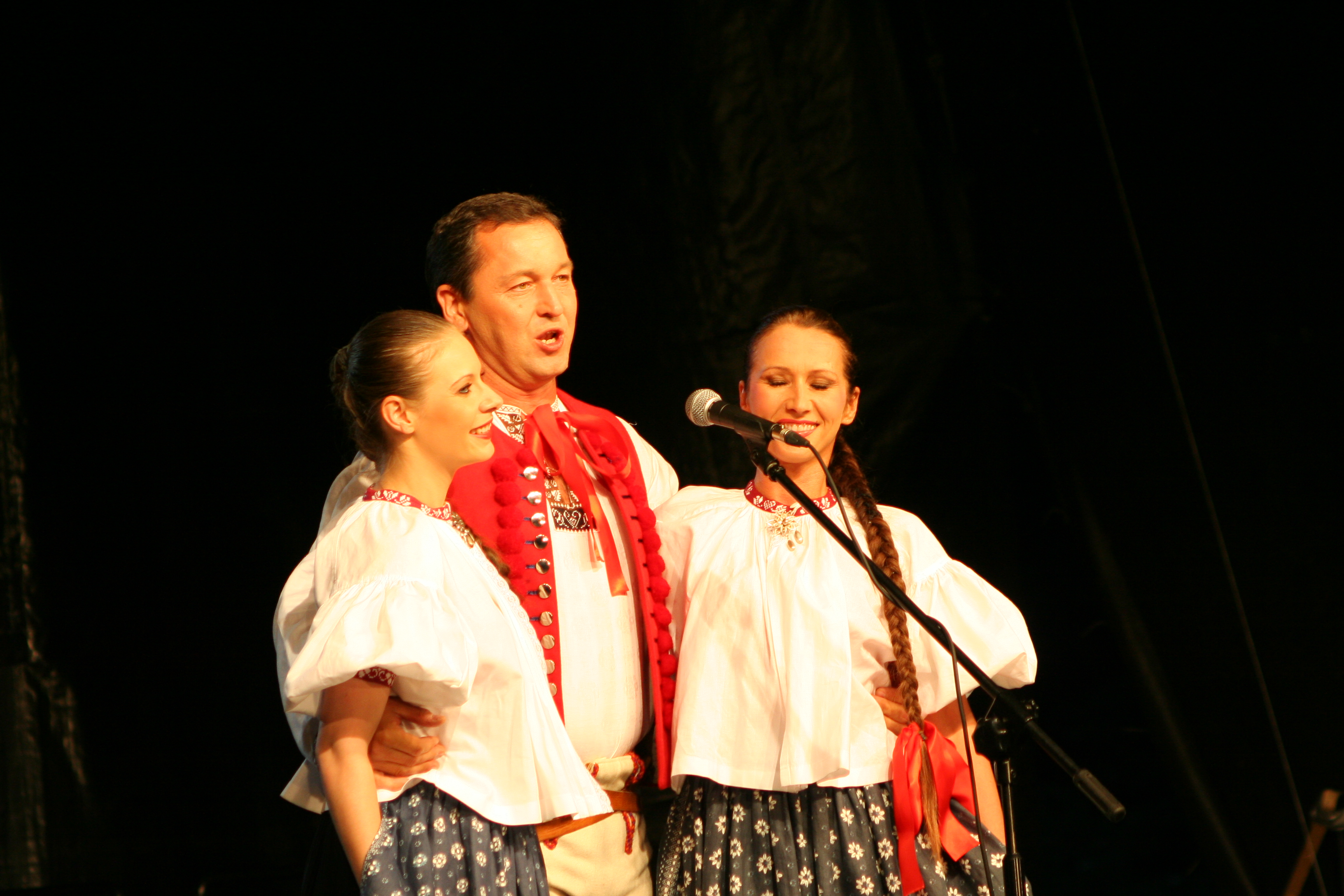
Silesian Gorals

=== Northern Poland (Pomerania, Kuyavia, Warmia) ===
- Kashubians
- Kocievians
- Tuchola Foresters
- Kuyavians
- Pyrzyce (historically German)
- Jamno (historically German)
- Warmians
- Krajnians
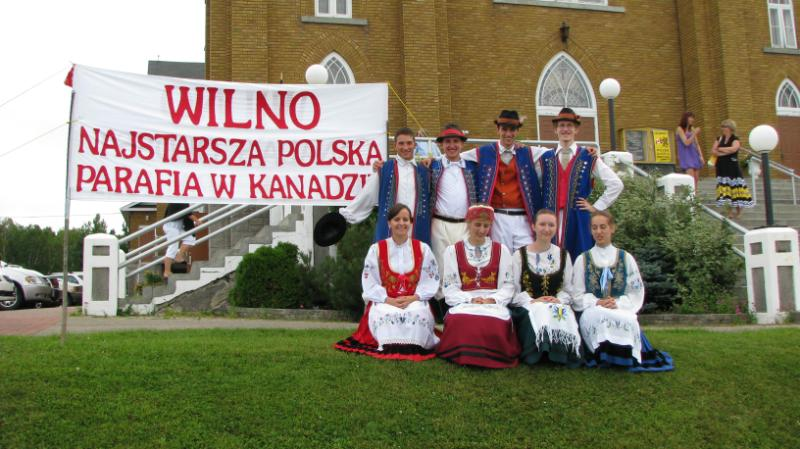
Kashubians in Canada

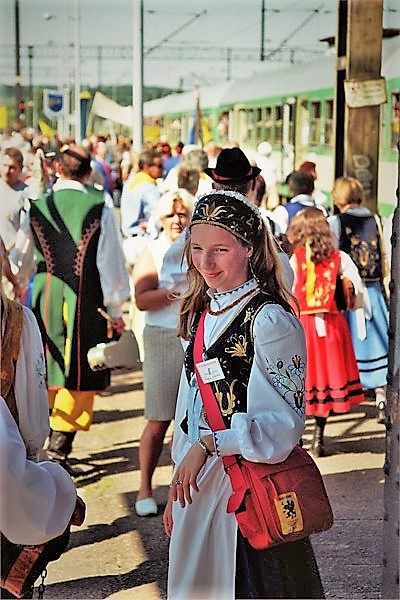
Kashubians

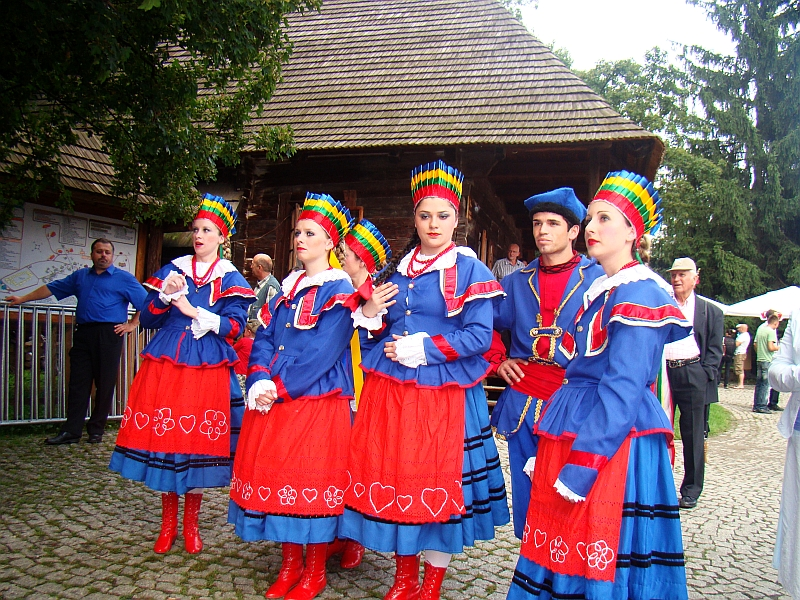
Kuyavians

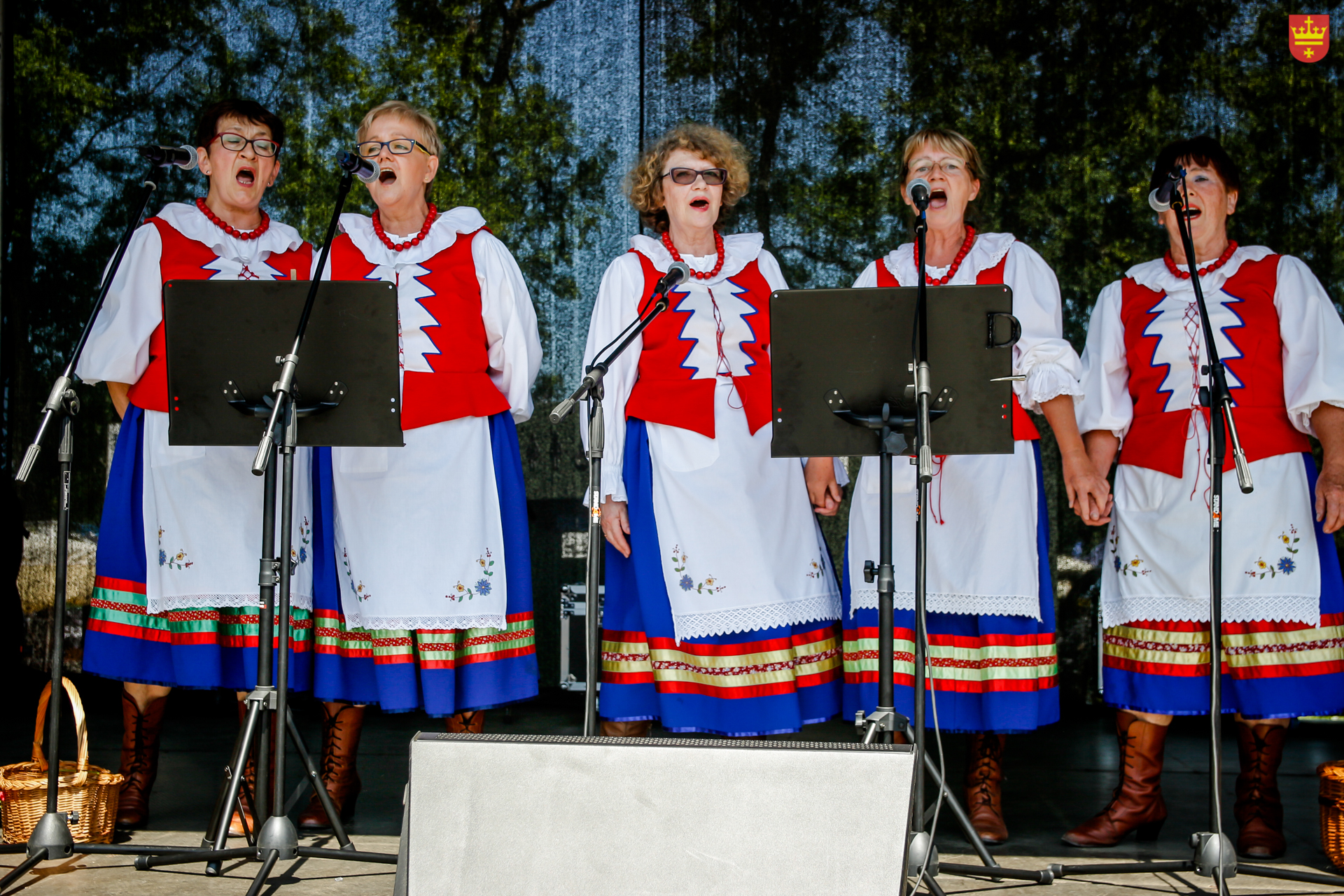
Kocievians

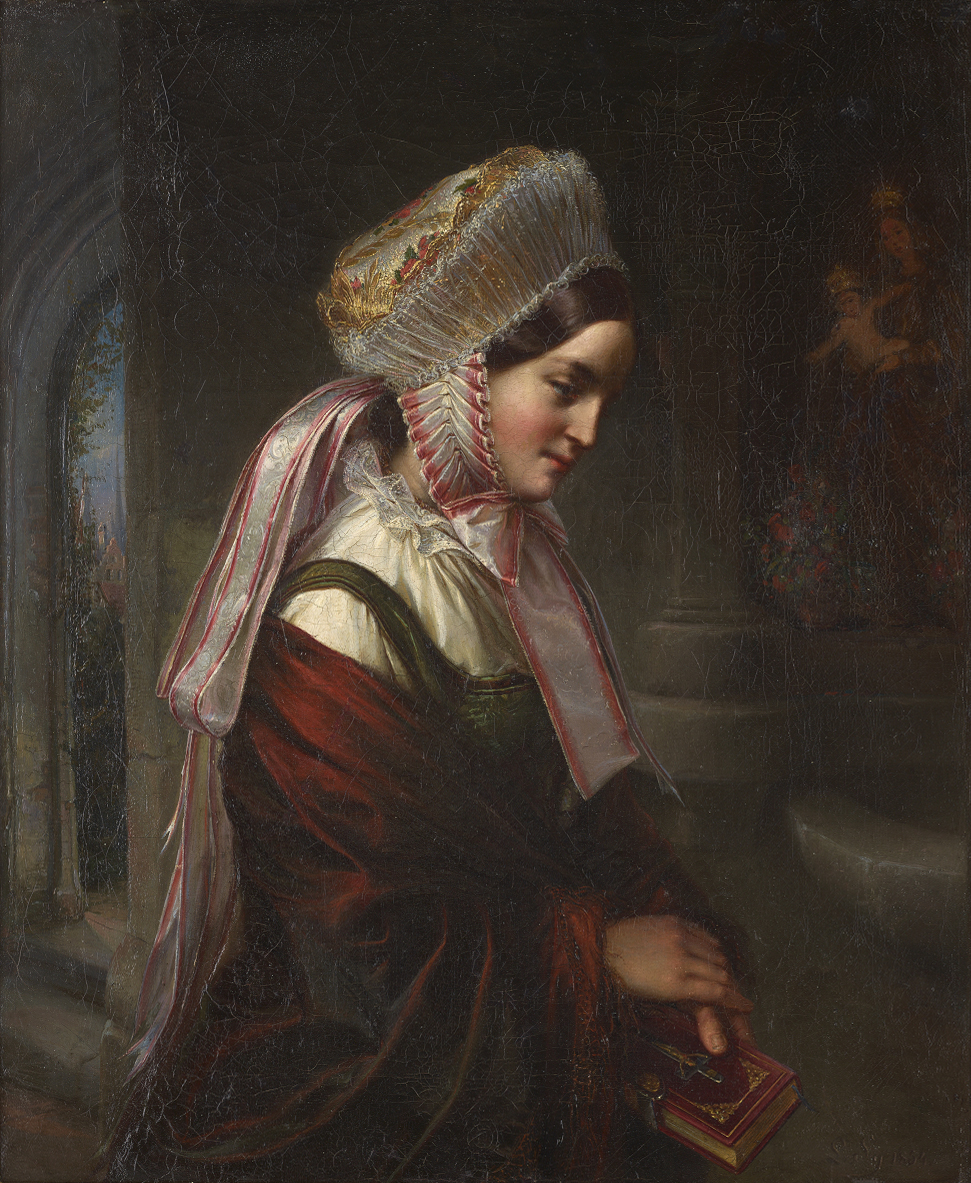
Young Warmian Woman at Prayer by Louis Friedrich Sy (1854)

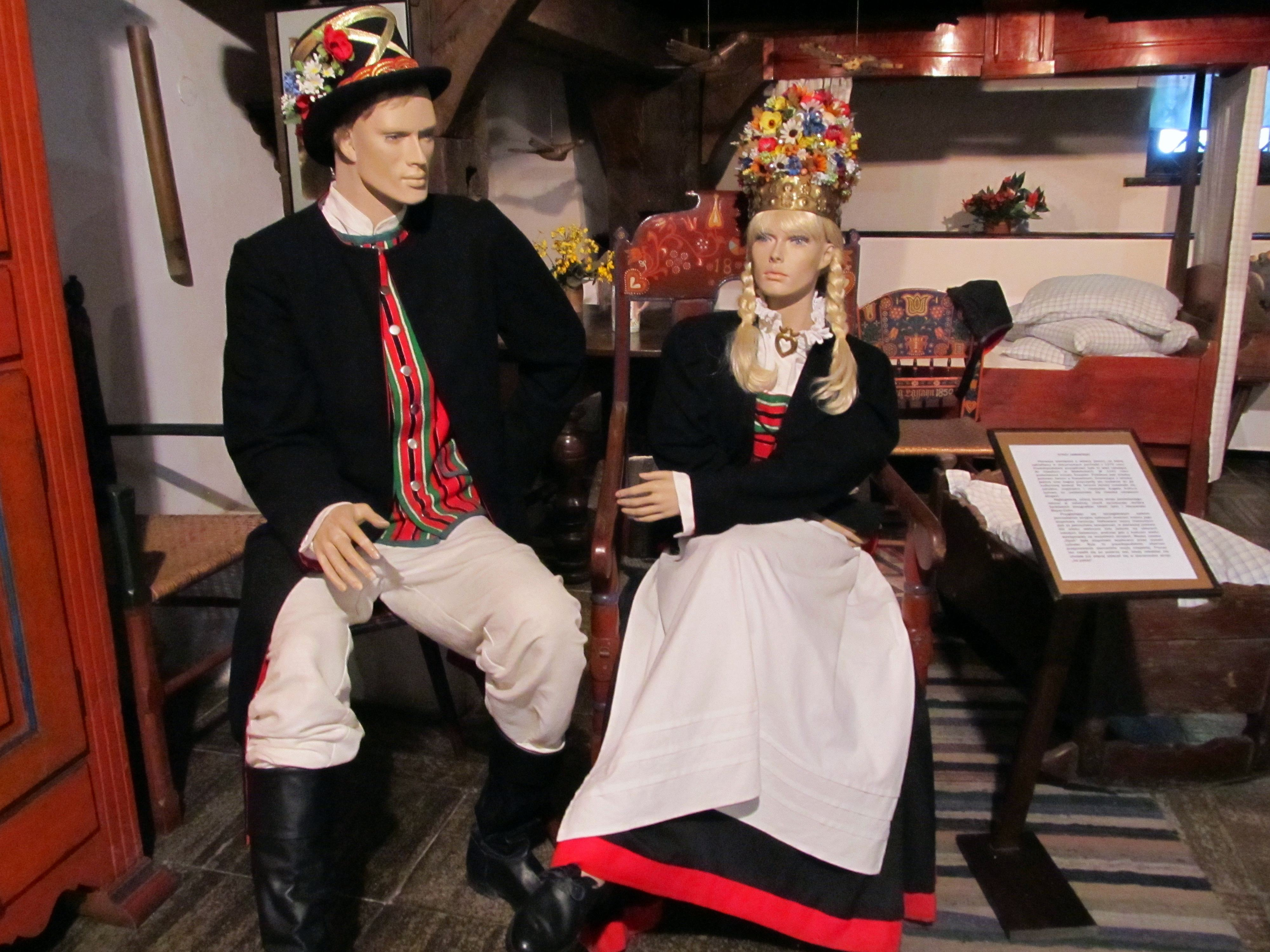
Jamno

=== Mazovia and central Poland ===
- Łowiczans
- Kurpie of the Green and White Primeval Forests
- Urzeczans (Wilanów)
- Opoczno
- Sieradzans
- Łęczycans
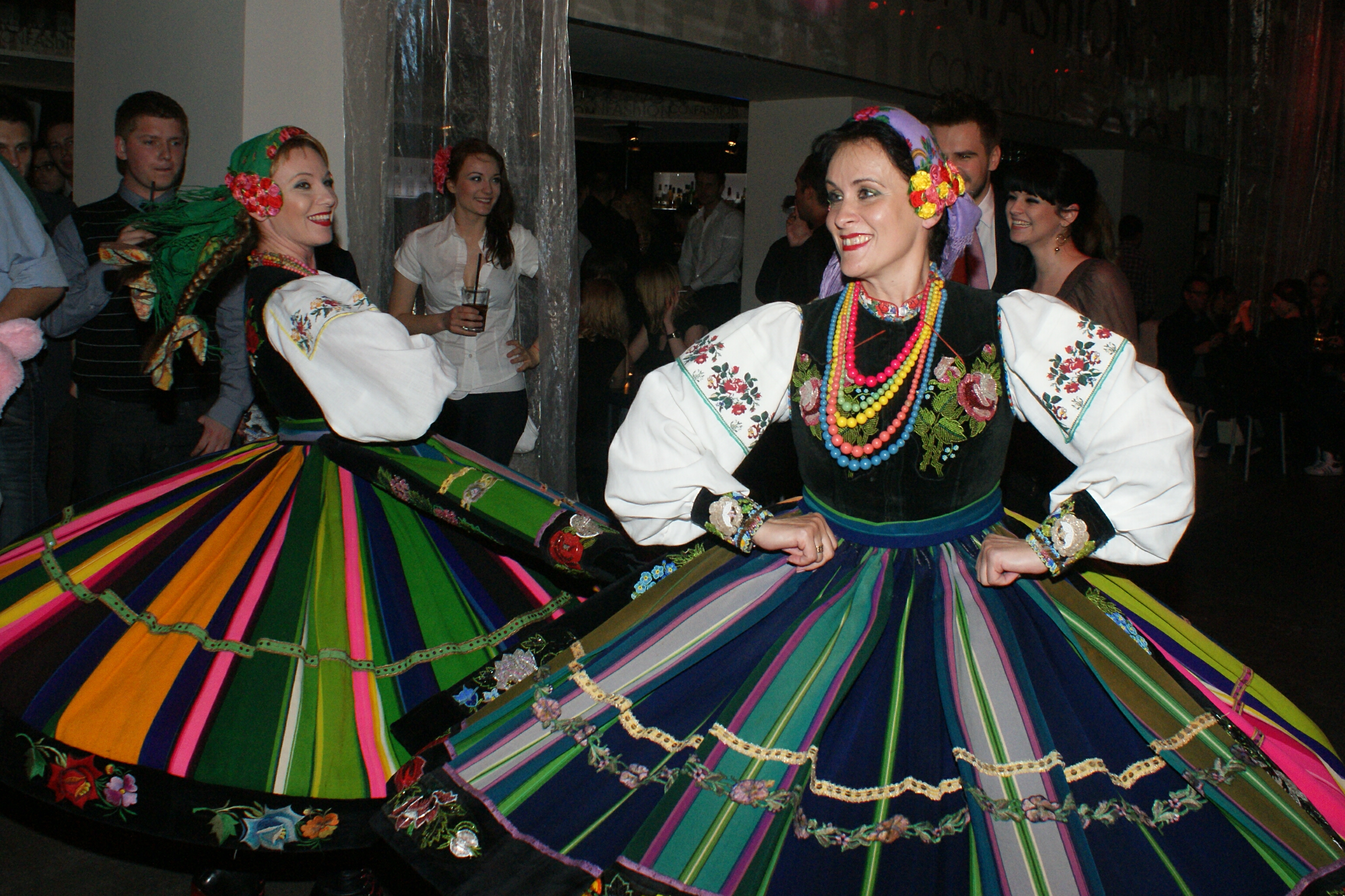
Łowiczans

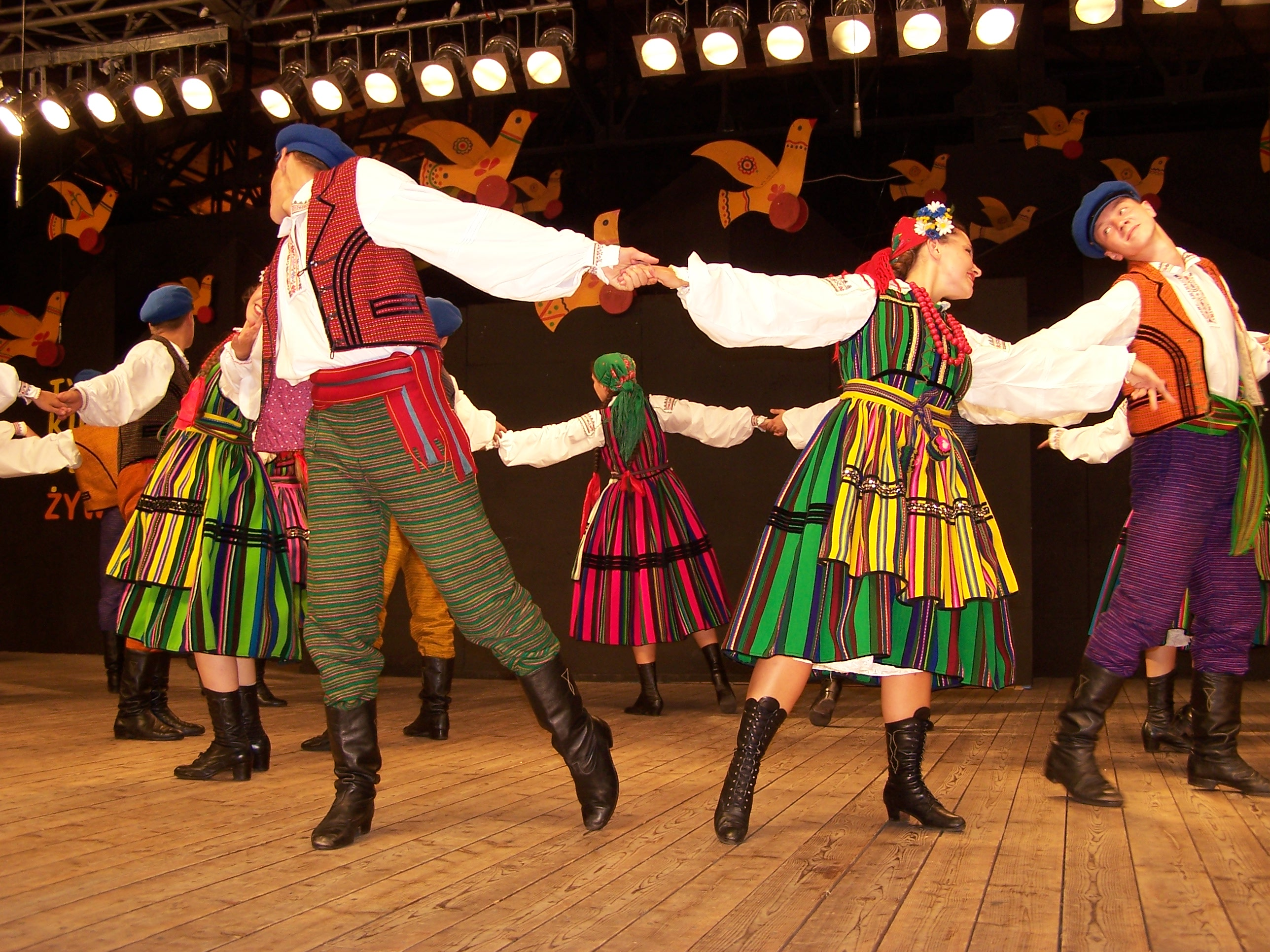
Opoczno

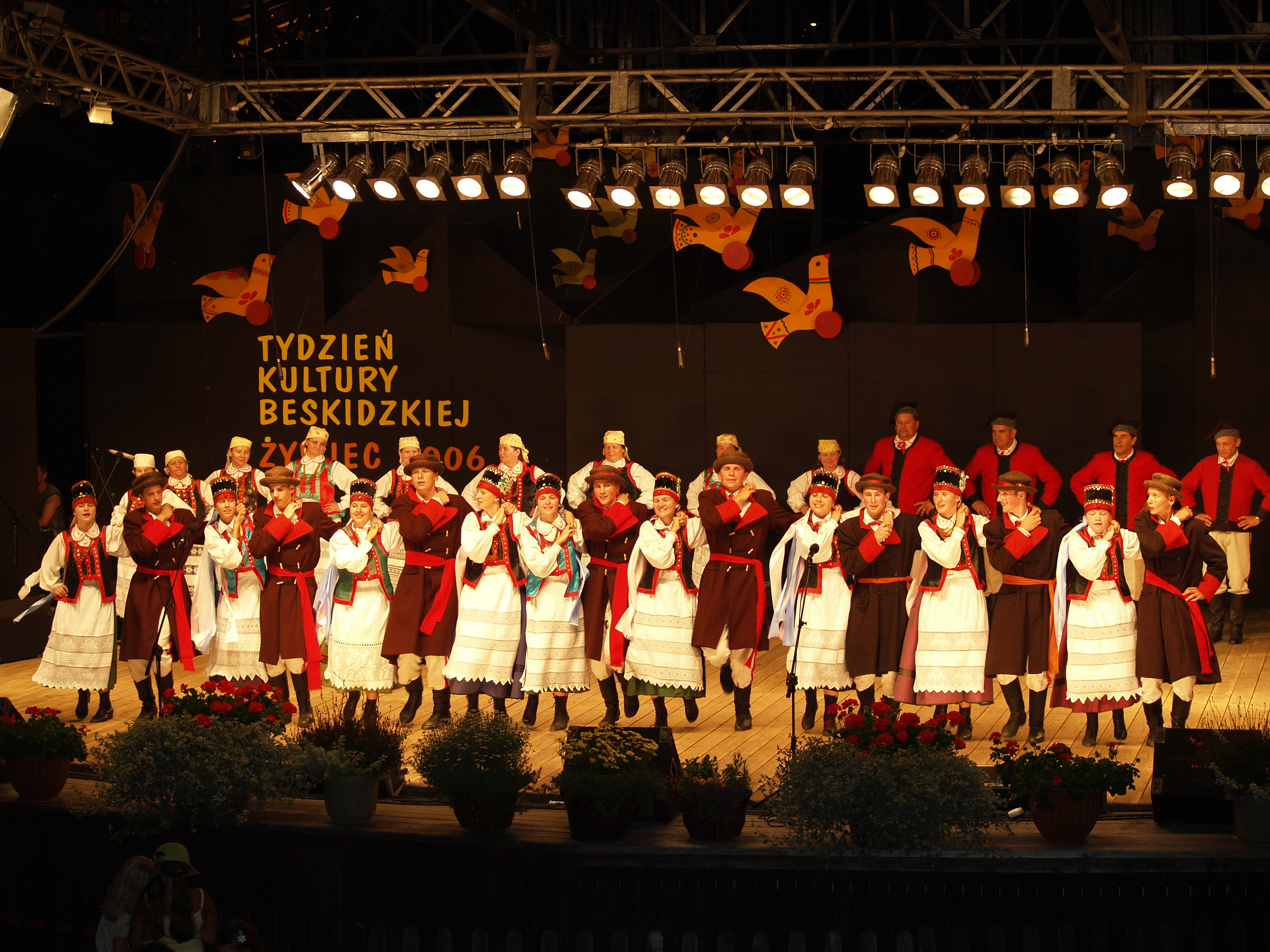
Green Forest Kurpie

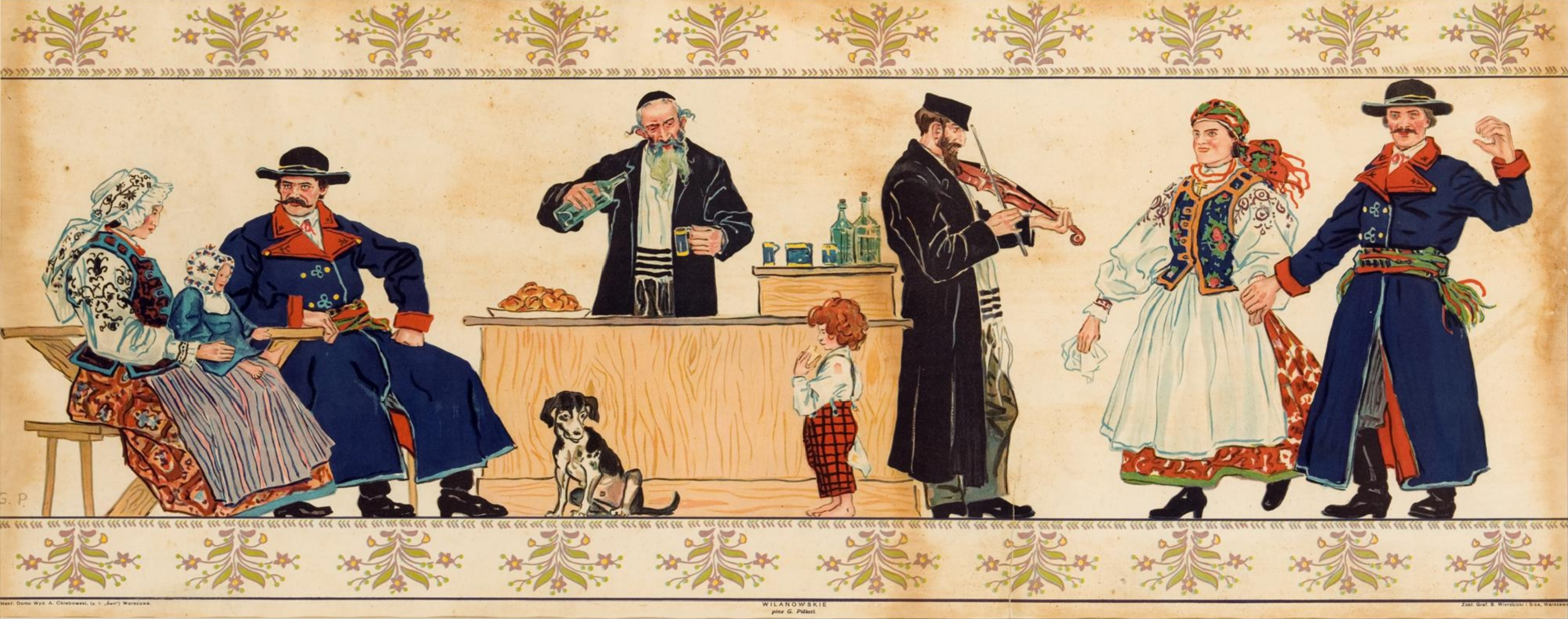
Urzeczans and Jews from WIlanów (present day district of Warsaw)

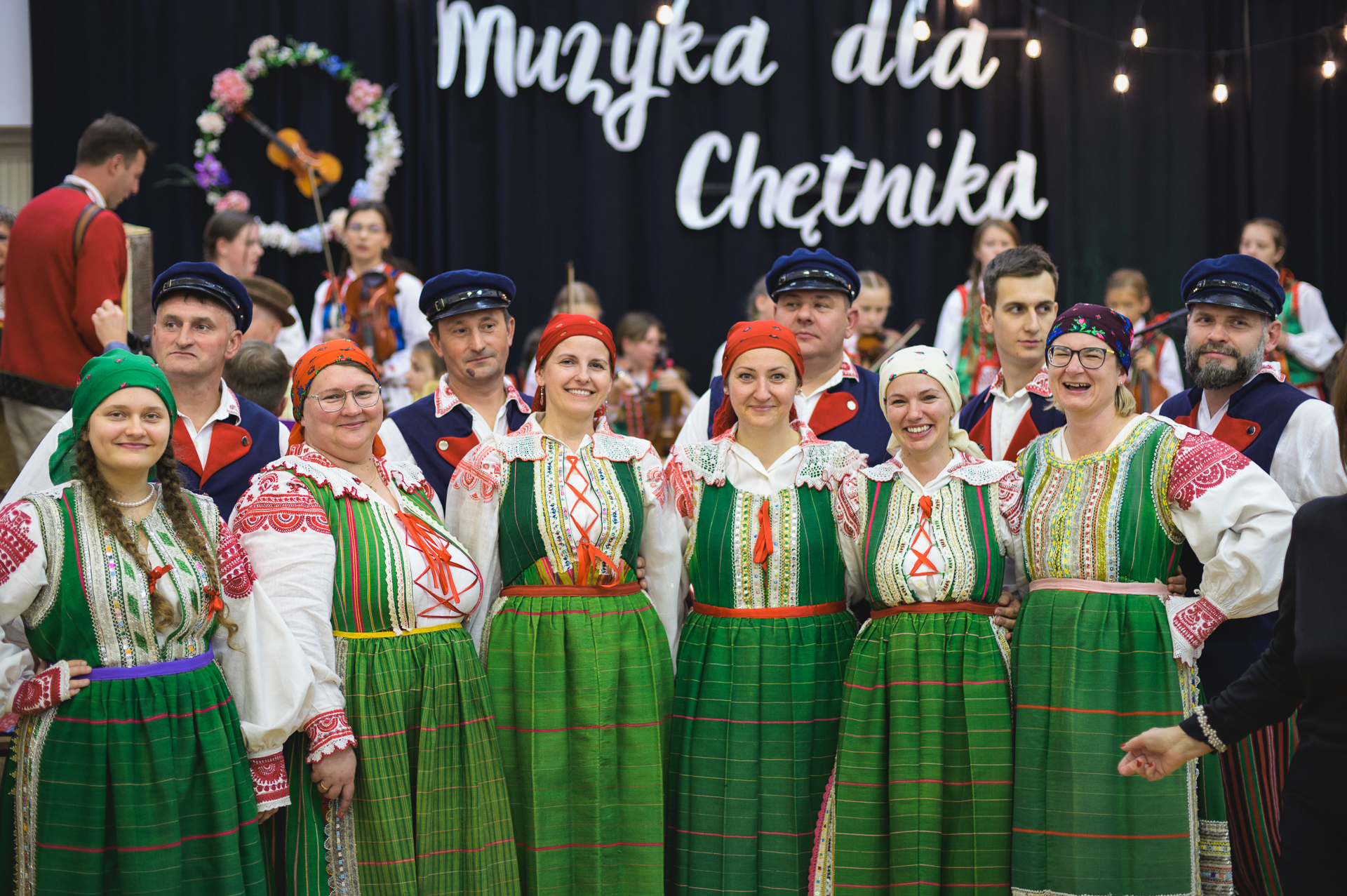
White Kurpie

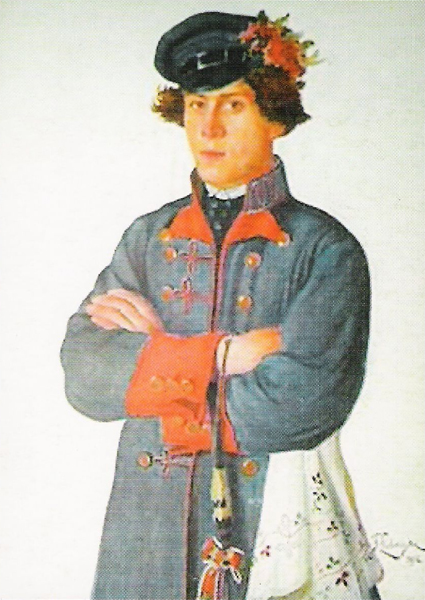
Young lad from Monice Jan Ograbek in a wedding costume by Franciszek Łubieński (1912), Sieradz Land

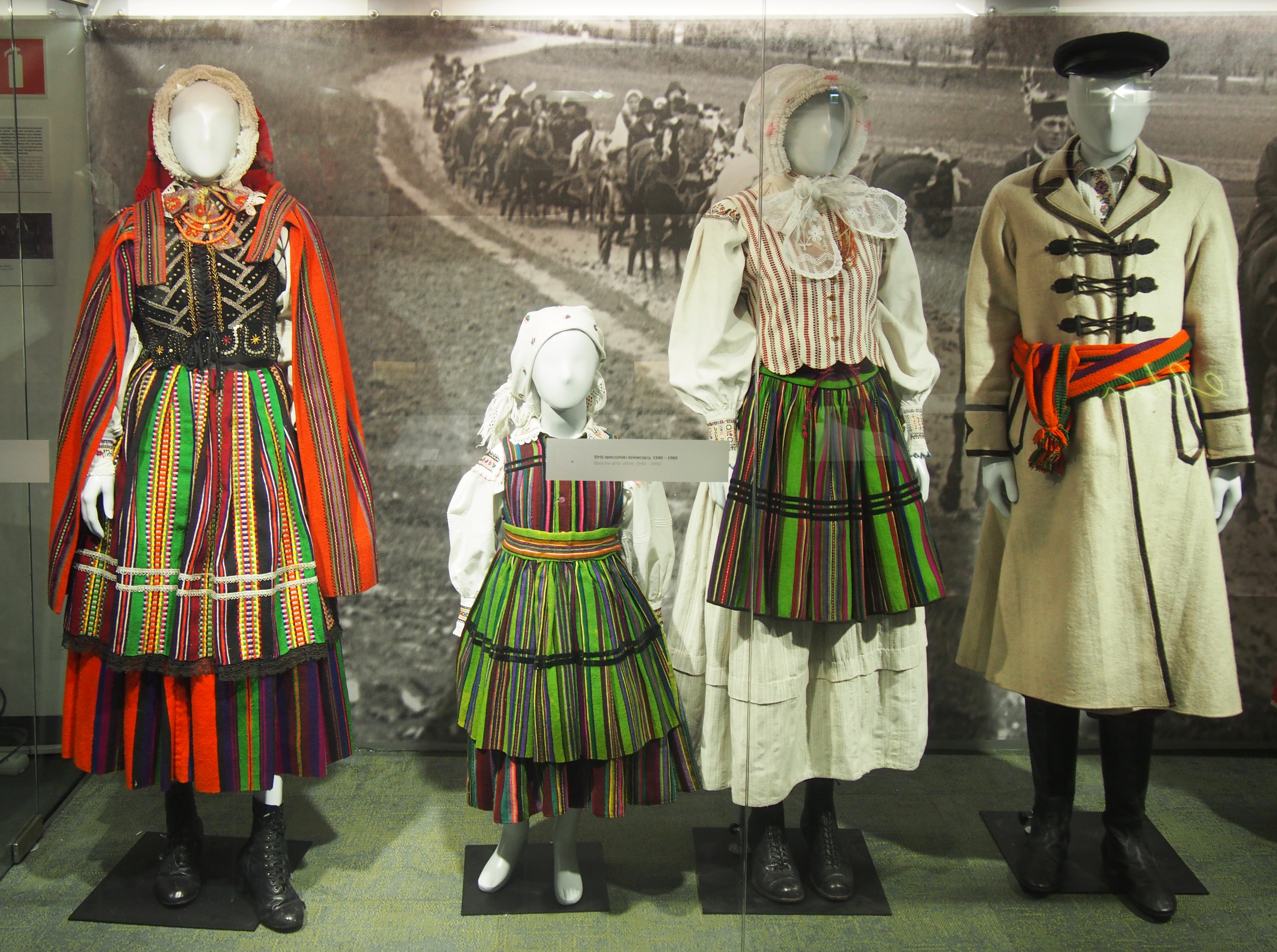
Opoczno group and Sieradzan folk costumes

=== Podlachia, Polesia and Sudovia ===
- Nadbużan/Southern Podlachian folk costume (both Lechites and East Slavs)
- Włodawa folk costume (both Lechites and East Slavs)
- Lipka Tatars
- Suwałki Poles
- Lithuanians from Puńsk
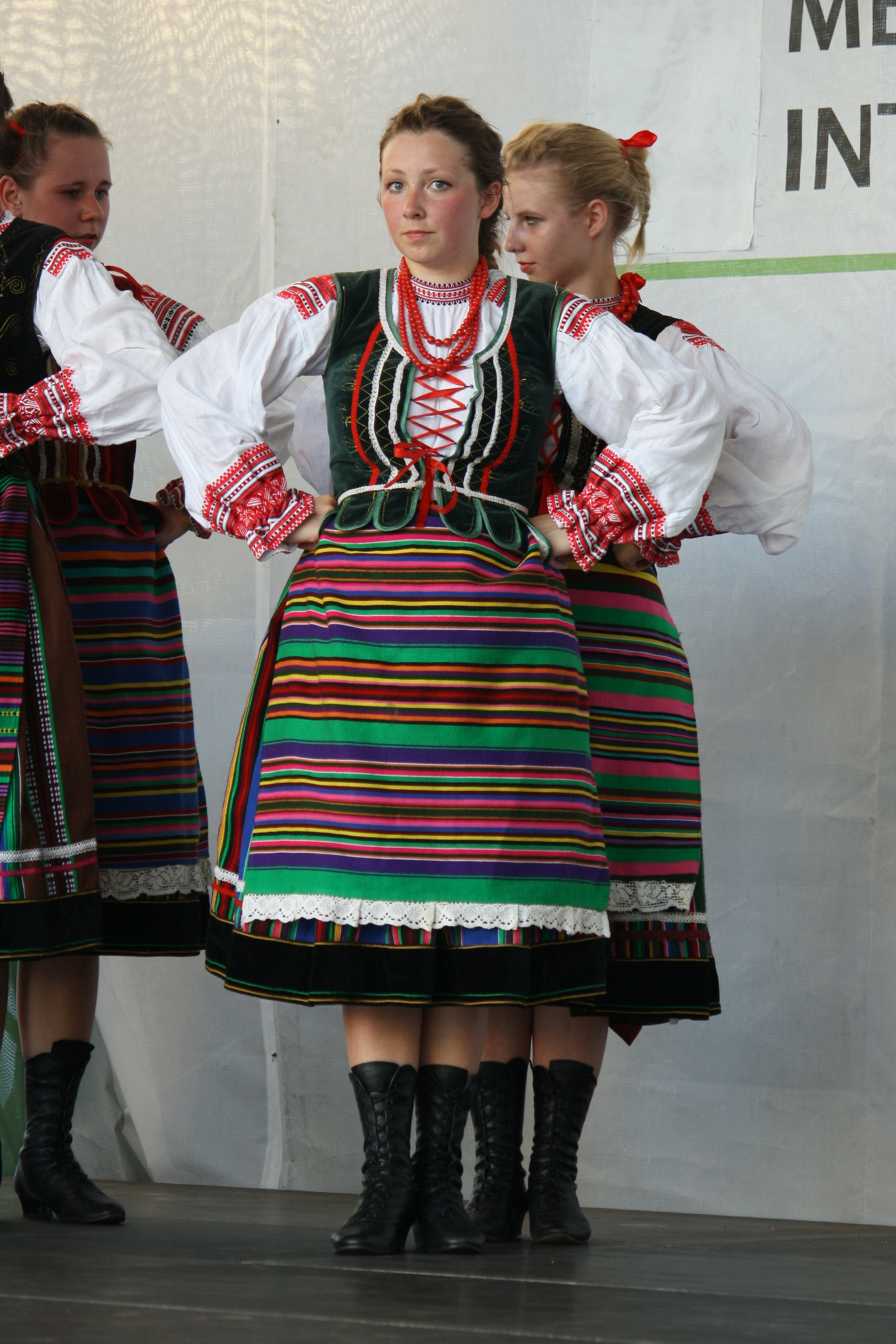
Nadbużan folk costume

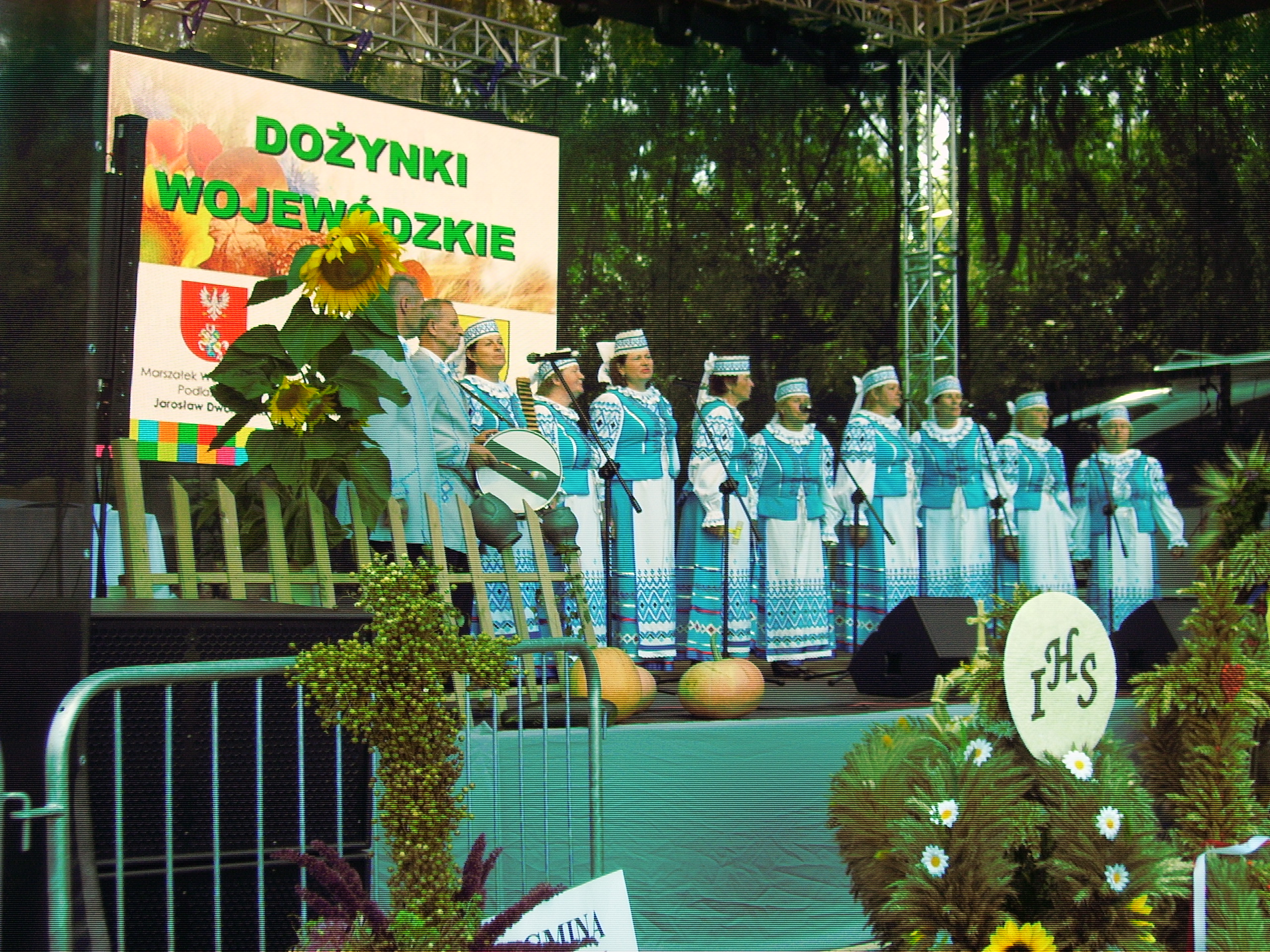
Lewkowo Stare

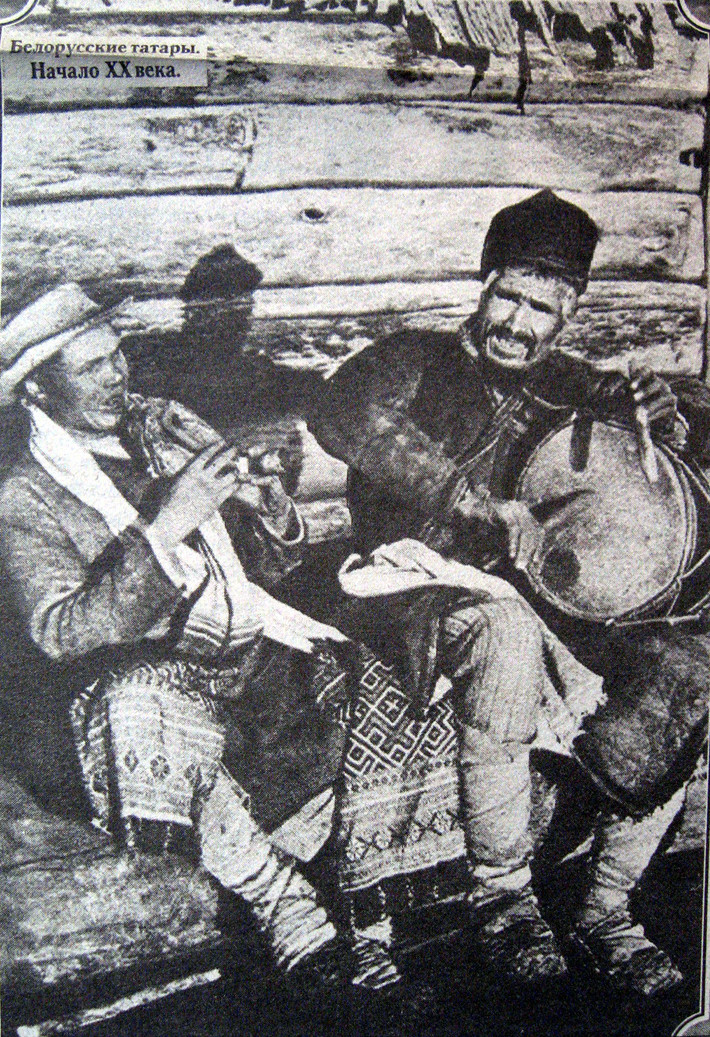
Tatars

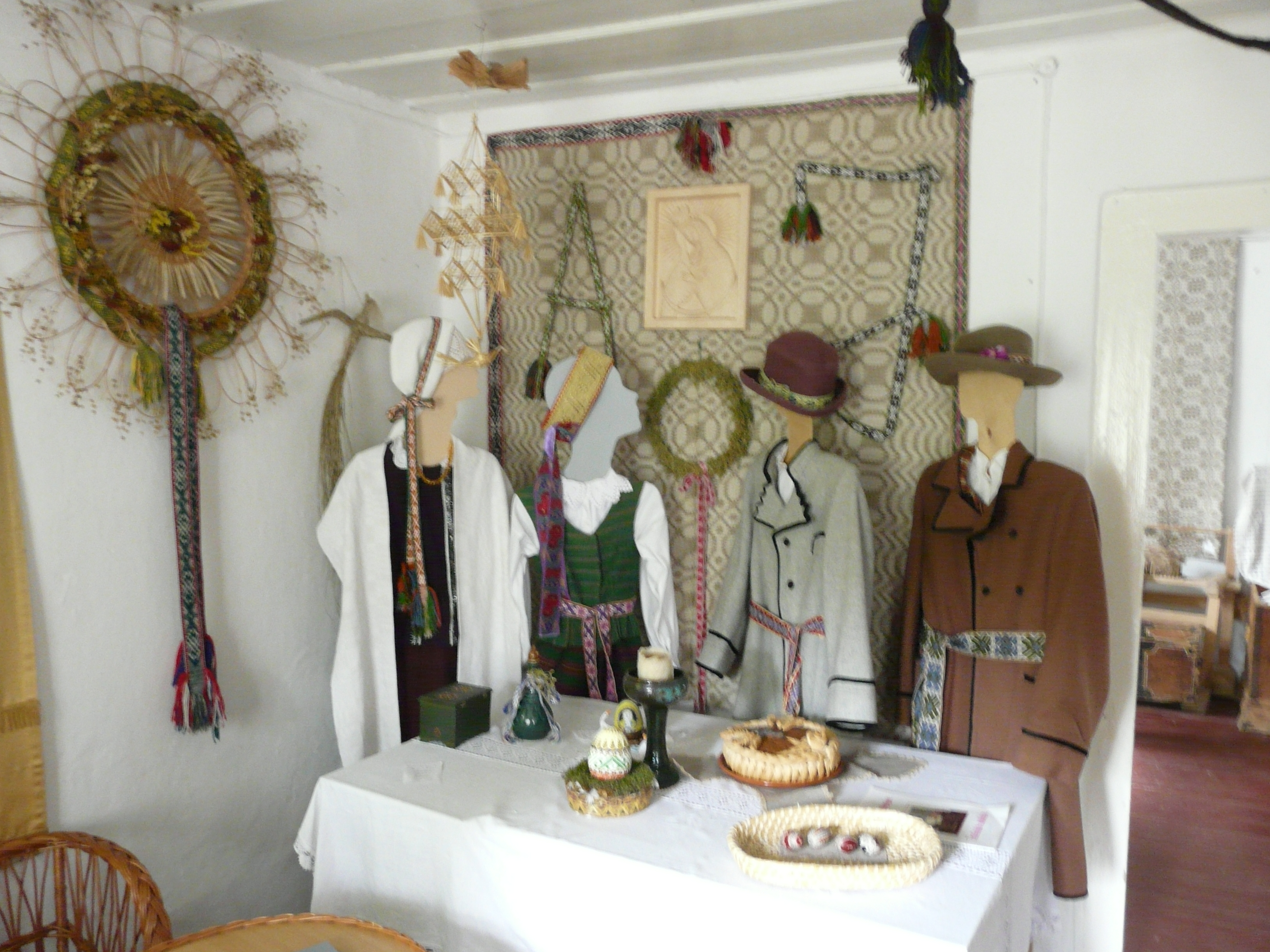
Lithuanians

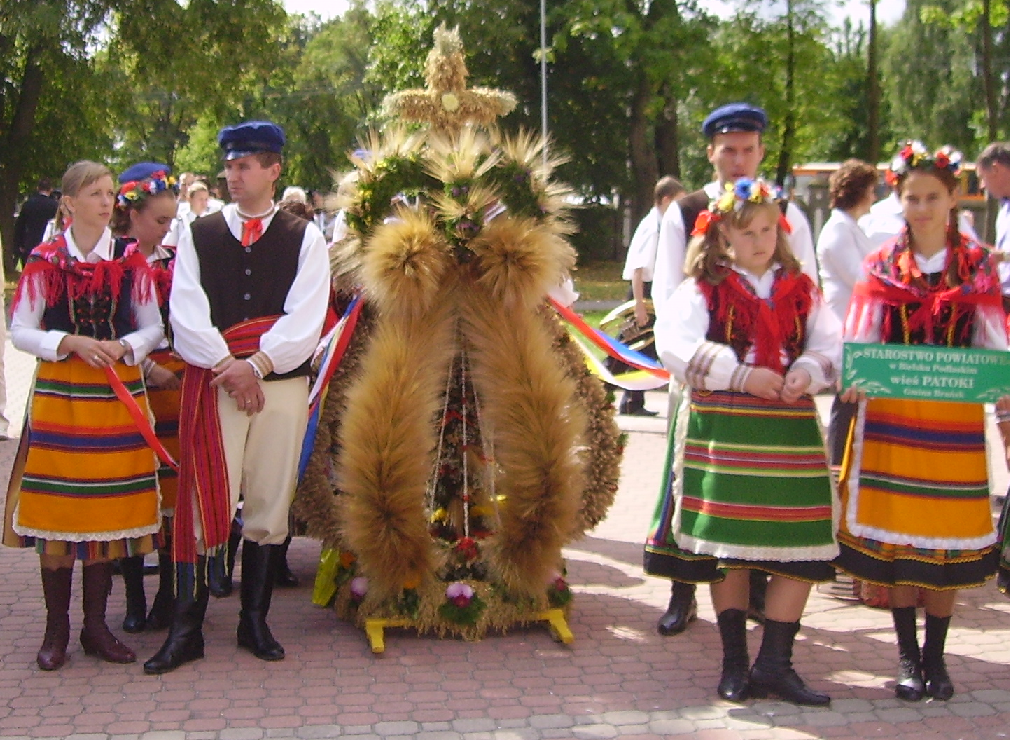
Mońki

=== Greater Poland ===
- Szamotulans
- Biskupians
- Kaliszans
- Pałukans
- Bambers (polonised Germans)
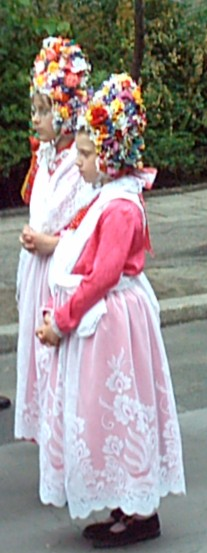
Bamber wearing unmarried woman's headpiece

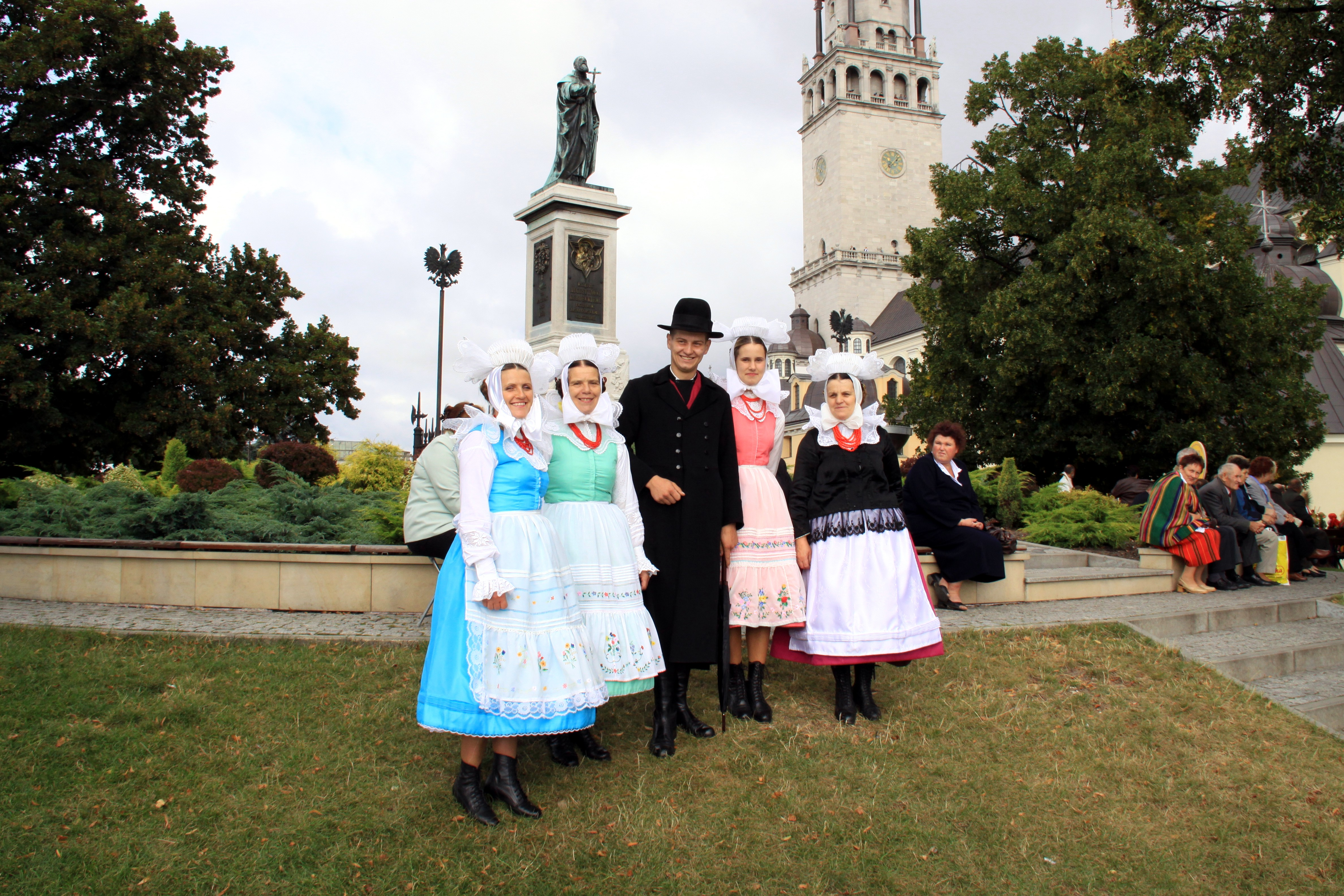
Bambers

=== Burghers ===
Mieszczanie were Polish burghers, among whom in 18th century czamaras gained a lot of popularity (especially in the Kraków region, hence the alternative name Kraków coat for czamara). In 19th century czamara became a Polish national and patriotic attire.Some towns like Żywiec, Jabłonków and Poznań and Greater Polish towns still retain their burgher costume.

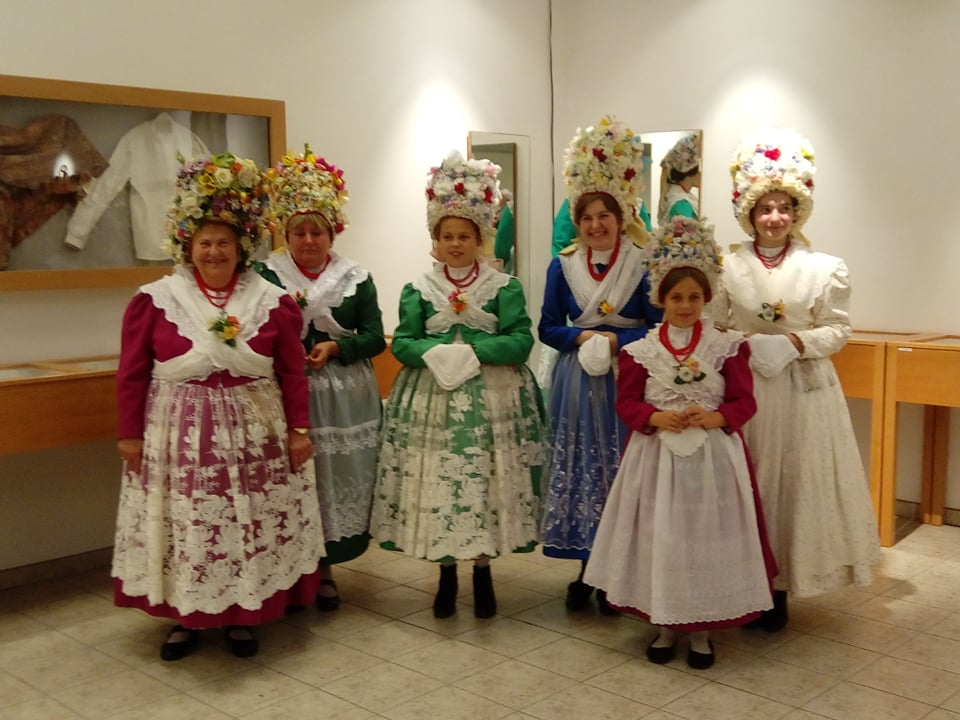
Bambers from Poznań

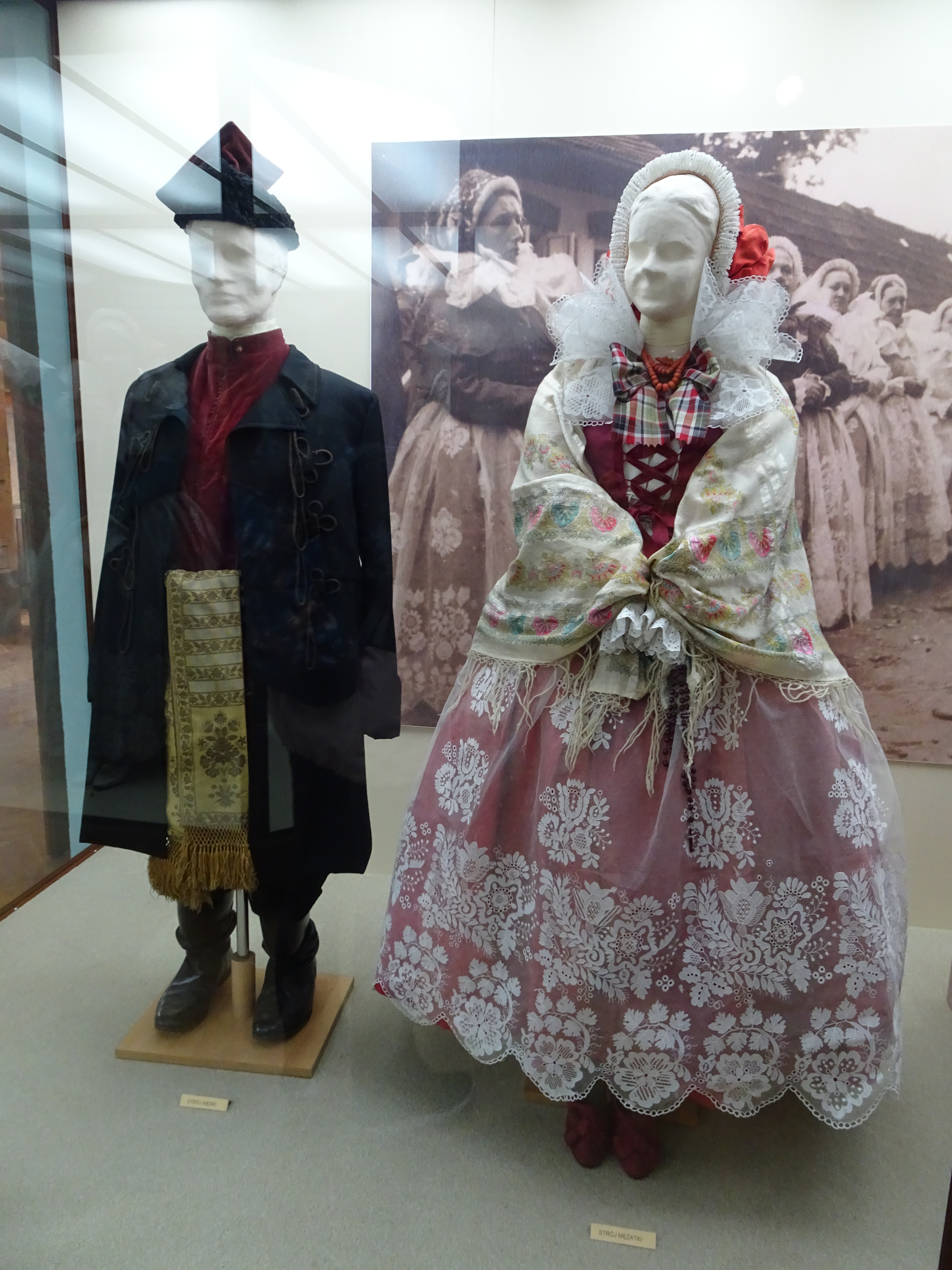
Żywiec Burghers

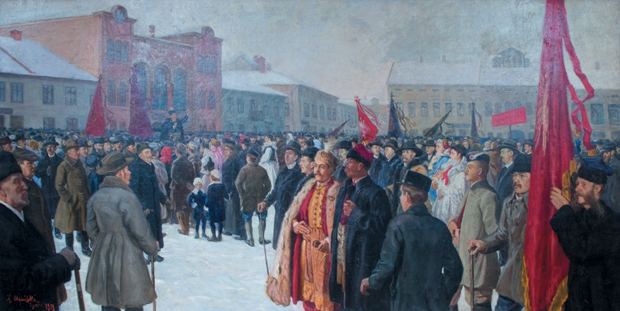
Festivity at the Żywiec town square by Jan Kazimierz Olpiński (1919)

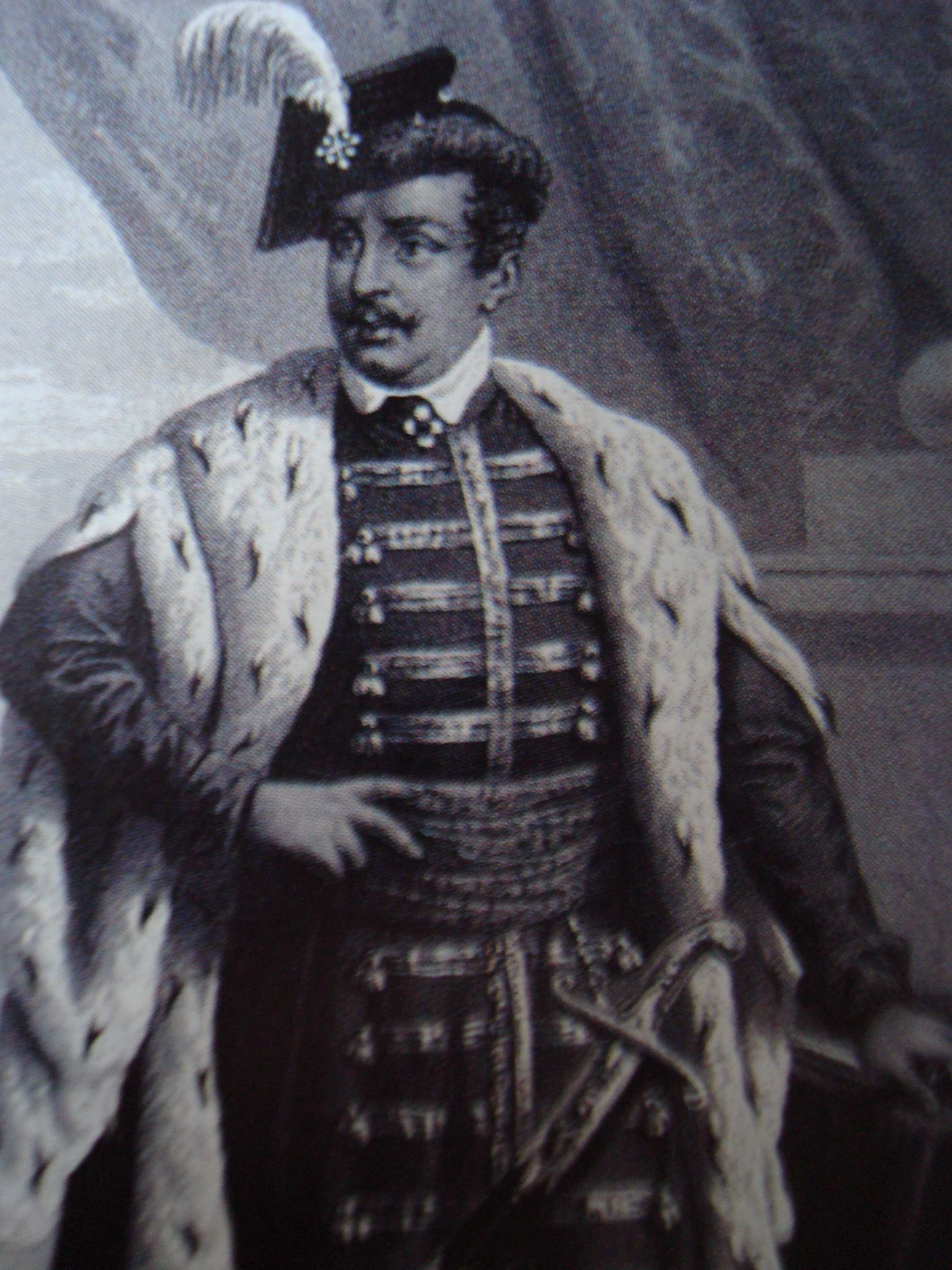
King Stanisław Leszczyński in a Cracovian costume

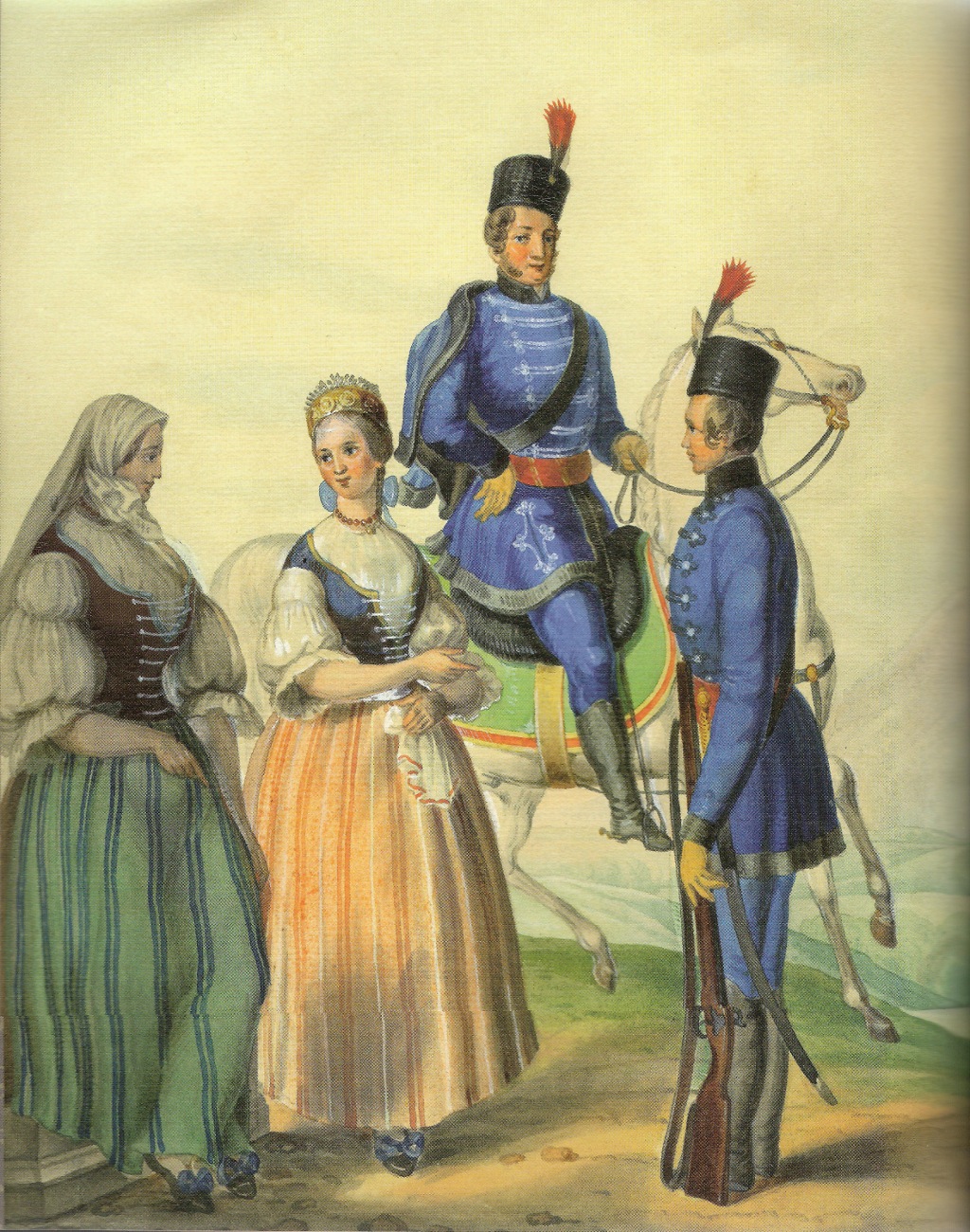
Jacki from Jabłonków

== See also ==
- Polish folk dances
