= Zagórze dialect =

Dialect of Polish spoken in Poland

- Native to: Poland
- Region: Zagórze
- Language family: Indo-European: Balto-Slavic; Slavic; West Slavic; Lechitic; Polish; Lesser Polish; Goral ethnolect; Zagórze dialect

Language codes
- ISO 639-3: –

The Zagórze dialect (Polish: gwara zagórzańska) also known as the Gorce dialect belongs to the Lesser Poland dialect group and is located in the southern part of Poland. It is in part one of the dialects that belongs to the Goral ethnolect. It borders the Podhale dialect to the south, the Kliszczak dialect to the west, the Kraków dialect to the north and the Goral and Lachy Sącz dialects to the east.

== Phonology ==
Typical of Lesser Polish dialects (as well as Greater Polish dialects), voicing of word-final consonants before vowels and liquids is present here. Also typical of Lesser Polish dialects is the presence of mazuration. Initial accent can be heard in the northern part of this dialect.

=== Vowels ===
-e- may be inserted between some consonant clusters: meter (metr). ił, il can lower to -eł, -el, with retention of softening of the previous consonant: robieł (robił). The so-called “Podhalanian archaism” is present inconsistently in the south; after etymological cz, ż, sz (now c, z, s) as well as after etymological cy, zy, sy, i is retained. The Lechitic ablaut is often absent before hard dental consonants: zawiezła (zawiozła). Standard -ur-, -yr- is sometimes replaced intervocalically with -ru-, -ry-, or vice-versa: furgać, murceć, fyrmak, Trubac.

==== Slanted vowels ====
Slanted á is retained as á or raises to o. Slanted é raises to y after both hard and soft consonants. Slanted ó is retained as ó.

==== Nasal vowels ====
The realization of nasal vowels here is not uniform. Two types can be distinguished, one in the north and one in the south. In the north, ǫ (nasal o) can be heard in place of the short Old Polish nasal vowel, and ǫ̇ (raised) can be heard in place of the long Old Polish nasal vowel, as well as instead of combinations of eN. In the north, yN can be heard word-medially, and word-finally a denasalized ó can be heard instead of the old long nasal.

==== Prothesis ====
Initial o- usually labializes to ô-. Initial u can also sometimes labialize to û-. Initial i- may gain a prothetic j-, and initial a- may sporadically gain a prothetic h- or j-. Labialization used to occur medially as well: kôsa.

=== Consonants ===
Final -ch strengthens to -k in all contexts, i.e. in stems: grok (groch); in morphological endings: na ôgrodak (na ogrodach), do tyk nasyk staryk ôjcóf (do tych naszych starych ojców), ôd nik (od nich), byłek (byłem), stáłbyk (stałbym). Dark ł, fricative rz, and -rzi- instead of -rzy- can be heard amongst older speakers. trz, strz, drz usually simplify to cz, szcz, dż. Intervocalic -ch- is often lost: słuała (słuchała). s may geminate in certain words: z lassa (z lasu). źr is present instead of jrz: uźreć (ujrzeć). ł is lost after plosive consonants: gupi (głupi), tuc (tłuc). A few words show a change of initial ch- to k-: kwila, krosta. rz may replace r in some words: śmierz (standard śmierć) and r can replace rz in others: biere (bierze).

== Inflection ==
Common Goral inflectional patterns are present here.

=== Nouns ===
As in the Podhale dialect, hard k and g can be heard in the masculine/neuter instrumental singular: patykem (patykiem), Bogem (Bogiem), predominately in fossilized adverbs: boskem, ciureckem, cołkem; kyrpce (standard kierpce). -owi is used for the dative for all masculine nouns and also in the masculine locative singular except for wół and cap. -a is preferred for the masculine genitive singular over -u. The nominative plural of collective virile nouns is formed with -á instead of -owie: wójciá (wójtowie). The nominative plural may be formed with -a instead of -y: sprzynta (sprzęty). The archaic -e of feminine genitive singular of soft stems is preserved: ze studnie (ze studni). -ǫ is used for the feminine accusative singular for nouns that end in -á in the nominative singular: idǫ na msǫ (idę na mszę). The archaic accusative singular -∅ for masculine non-inanimate nouns can sometimes be seen here: na świynty Scepón (na świętego Szczepana); dóm retains an archaic adverbial prepositional dóma (w domu). A masculine archaic genitive plural -∅ can be seen: jyncmión (jęczmieni), mórg (morgów), Dunajcón (Dunajczanów); the old instrumental plural ending -mi occurs in wółmi (wołami), but kóń takes kóniami;

Slanted á may be retained in the feminine nominative singular as -o, especially in Latinate nouns ending in -yjo (standard -ja). The archaic form klaca is retained (standard klacz); tydzień declines only in the second element (tydźnia, standard tygodnia); rok does not show the suppletive plural lata, e.g. roków (standard lat) and brat shows suppletion only in the nominative plural (bratów, standard braci); jegomość (priest) retains an old feminine declension.

=== Adjectives and adverbs ===
Final -ej shifts to -y (after hard consonants), -i (after soft consonants): gorzy (gorzej), bardzi (bardziej), do stary baby (do starej baby). The superlative may be formed with either no- or noj-. The superlative of adjectives and adverbs may be formed with no- or noj- (standard naj-).

=== Verbs ===
Certain verb declensions are leveled: biere (bierze). The aorist is retained in the first person singular, with a shift of -ch > -k: byłek (byłem), and can also be seen in the first person conditional: siádbyk (siadłbym). Historically, in the north (Kasina Wielka, Węglówka), the dual ending -wa was exceptionally used for the first person plural present and imperative: idziewa, pódźwa; however, since neighboring dialects didn't have this feature, it was lost. być often has its forms levelled and a preference for the presence of a personal pronoun: jo jest (jestem), my sóm (jesteśmy), wyście sóm (jesteście). In Kasina Wielka and Węglówka, -va can be seen in the first-person plural present and imperative. The contemporary adverbial participle is formed with -yncy (<-ęcy) instead of -ąc.

=== Prepositions and prefixes ===
z- and z are often archaically retained as s- and s- and allophonically realized as ś- and ś in front of liquids and w, ẃ: śloz (zlazł), śległa (zległa), świjać (zwijać), swyrtok (zwyrtak), s Msane (z(e)) Mszany.

== Vocabulary ==
=== Word-Formation ===
Typical Lesser Polish word-formation tendencies can be seen here.

==== Nouns ====
-ón is often used instead of -anin. Attributive nouns are more often formed with -ość instead of -ota: gupość (głupota); -ę is used more often than -ak for young animals; conversely -ba, -ota, and -ać may occur more frequently for deverbals or deadjectivals: kwolba (chwalba), skrzepota, pustać (empty place; field). Common masculine diminutive endings include -ocek (-aczek), -osek (-aszek), -icek/-ycek (-iczek/-yczek), -uś, -ik; feminine include -sia, -usia, -cia, -ina. Common augmentative/pejorative endings include -isko/-ysko. Agentative and attributive deadjectival nouns are formed often with -oc (-acz) and -ok (-ak).

==== Adjectives, adverbs, and pronouns ====
Possessive adjectives may be formed with -in as well as -ów. Diminutive adjectives are often formed with -utki, -uśki, -usieńki. Frequent adjective endings include -asty, -awy, -owy, and -owaty; -ni occurs often instead of standard -ny.

Adverbs are formed with -e and -o as in standard Polish but their distribution may be different; adverbs may be extended with -ki; adverbs with -dy occur more frequently.

Interminate pronouns are often formed with -si instead of -ś; pronouns may also be extended with -ki: naski (nasz), cosik (coś), and many periphrastic extensions exist, e.g. choć kto (byle kto).

==== Verbs ====
Iteratives are often formed with -ować instead of -ywać/-iwać or -ać.

== Syntax ==
Masculine personal nouns and masculine animal nouns are often levelled: chłopy posły (chłopi poszli), ôba siedzieli (obaj siedzieli); przygnoł piynciu baranów i trzok kóni (przygnał pięć baranów i trzy konie); kosiniany grały piyknie (kasinianie grali pięknie).

== See also ==
- Dialects of the Polish language
- Languages of Europe
- Polish language
