= Dialects of Polish =

Overview of dialects of the Polish language

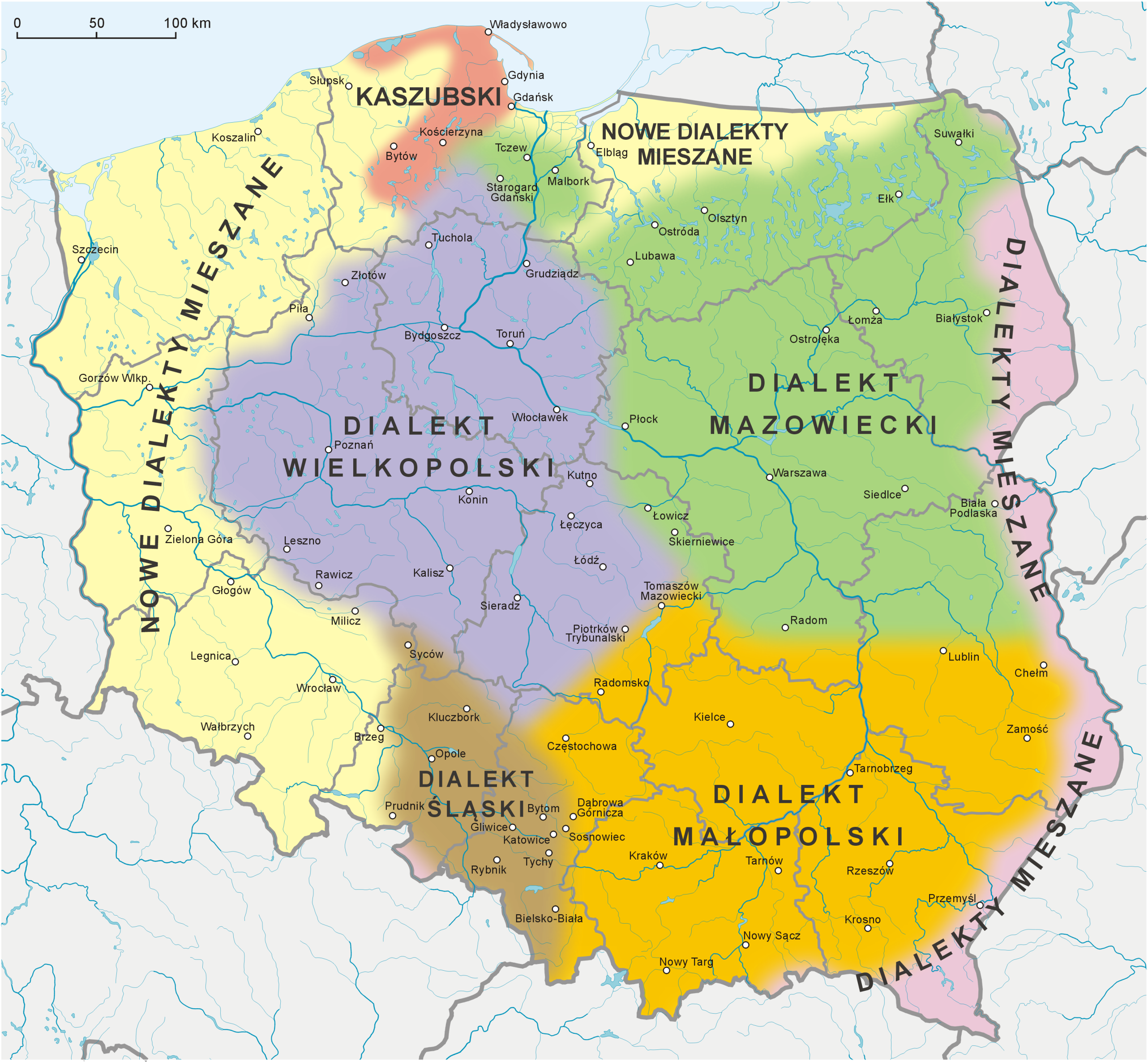
Subdivision of Polish dialects according to Karol Dejna

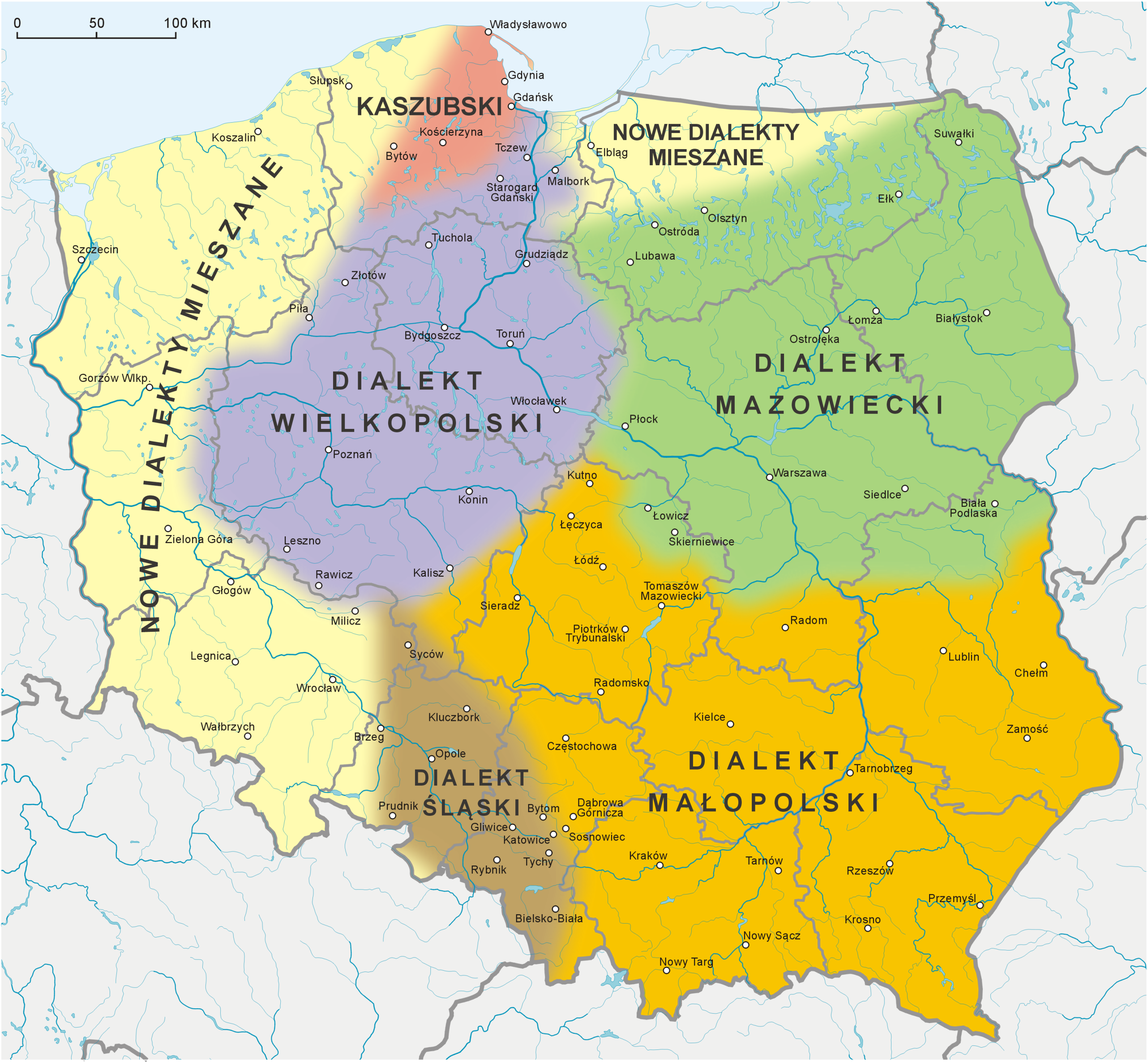
Subdivision of Polish dialects according to Stanisław Urbańczyk

Translations:
- Dialekt wielkopolski – Greater Poland dialect group
- Dialekt małopolski – Lesser Poland dialect group
- Dialekt mazowiecki – Masovian dialect group
- Dialekty mieszane – Mixed dialects
- Nowe dialekty mieszane – New mixed dialects
- Śląski – Silesian (Note: Also considered a separate language)
- Kaszubski – Kashubian

Polish dialects are regional vernacular varieties of the Polish language, and often show developments starting from an earlier stage of the language, often Old Polish or Middle Polish, namely the development of the so-called "pitched" or "slanted" vowels (Polish samogłoski pochylone).

Four major dialect groups (termed dialekt) are typically recognized, each primarily associated with a particular geographical region, and often further subdivided into dialects (termed gwara in Polish). They are:

- Greater Polish, spoken in the west
- Lesser Polish, spoken in the south and southeast
  - Goral, spoken in the mountains on the Poland-Slovakia border
- Masovian, spoken throughout the central and eastern parts of the country
- Silesian spoken in the southwest (sometimes also considered a separate language)

The regional differences correspond mainly to old ethnic or tribal divisions from around a thousand years ago. As a result of 19th century measures taken by occupying powers, expulsions plus other displacements of Poles during and after World War II, as well as language policy in the Polish People's Republic, supplemented by broadcast media, the Polish language has become extremely homogeneous. In the modern day, dialectal variation can be found among mostly older generations.

Traditionally two additional dialect groups were treated alongside the aforementioned, adding to a total of six. These varieties have been put at risk of extinction due to historic geopolitical population movements. They are:

- Northern Kresy, spoken along the border between Lithuania and Belarus
- Southern Kresy, spoken in isolated pockets in Ukraine

Often the usage of dialects are avoided due to negative associations and low prestige, and as such, there is often a preference for Standard Polish, and many dialects are slowly being abandoned, and instead regionalisms within Standard Polish are more common. However, some dialects are still widely used.

== Notation ==
In order to accurately notate phonetic differences in dialects, letters outside standard Polish orthography are sometimes used, or some letters have uses different than in Standard Polish. Namely, they are:

- á for the slanted a (Polish pronunciation: [ɒ]) (as opposed to a for (Polish pronunciation: [a])
- é for the slanted e (Polish pronunciation: [e]) (as opposed to e for (Polish pronunciation: [ɛ])
- ó for the slanted ó (Polish pronunciation: [o]) (as opposed to o for (Polish pronunciation: [ɔ])
- ô for labialized o (Polish pronunciation: [wɔ])
- û for labialized u (Polish pronunciation: [wu])
- ÿ (in Masurian) or ý (Goral dialects) for non-palatalizing Polish pronunciation: [i].

== Dialect and language distinctions ==
Although traditional linguistic divisions continue to be cited, especially in Polish sources, the current linguistic consensus tends to consider Kashubian a separate language, or at least as a distinct lect that cannot be grouped at the same level as the four major modern Polish dialects. Prior to World War II, Kashubian speakers were mainly surrounded by German speakers, with only a narrow border to the south with Polish speakers. Kashubian contains a number of features not found in other Polish dialects, e.g. nine distinct oral vowels (vs. the six of standard Polish), evolution of the Proto-Slavic TorT group to TarT (a feature not found in any other Slavic language) and (in the northern dialects) phonemic word stress, an archaic feature preserved from Common Slavic times and not found anywhere else among the West Slavic languages.

The two Kresy dialects are spoken in Kresy, the former eastern Polish territories annexed by the Soviet Union in 1945 and currently absorbed into Lithuania, Belarus and Ukraine. Both dialect groups have been in decline since World War II as a result of expulsions of millions of Poles from Kresy. Poles living in Lithuania (particularly in the Vilnius region), in Belarus (particularly in the northwest), and in northeast Poland continue to speak the Northern Kresy dialect, which sounds (in Polish described as zaciąganie z ruska) as if speaking with a Ruthenian drawl, and is quite distinctive.

The majority of Poles expelled from Kresy were settled in newly annexed regions in northern and western Poland, and thereby their manner of speech evolved into so-called new mixed dialects. However, among the declining older generation there are still traces of Kresy dialect with its characteristic Ukrainian or Rusyn sounds, especially in the use of the East Slavic velarised L where standard Polish has it already vocalised (/w/) and of elongated vowels.

== List of dialects ==
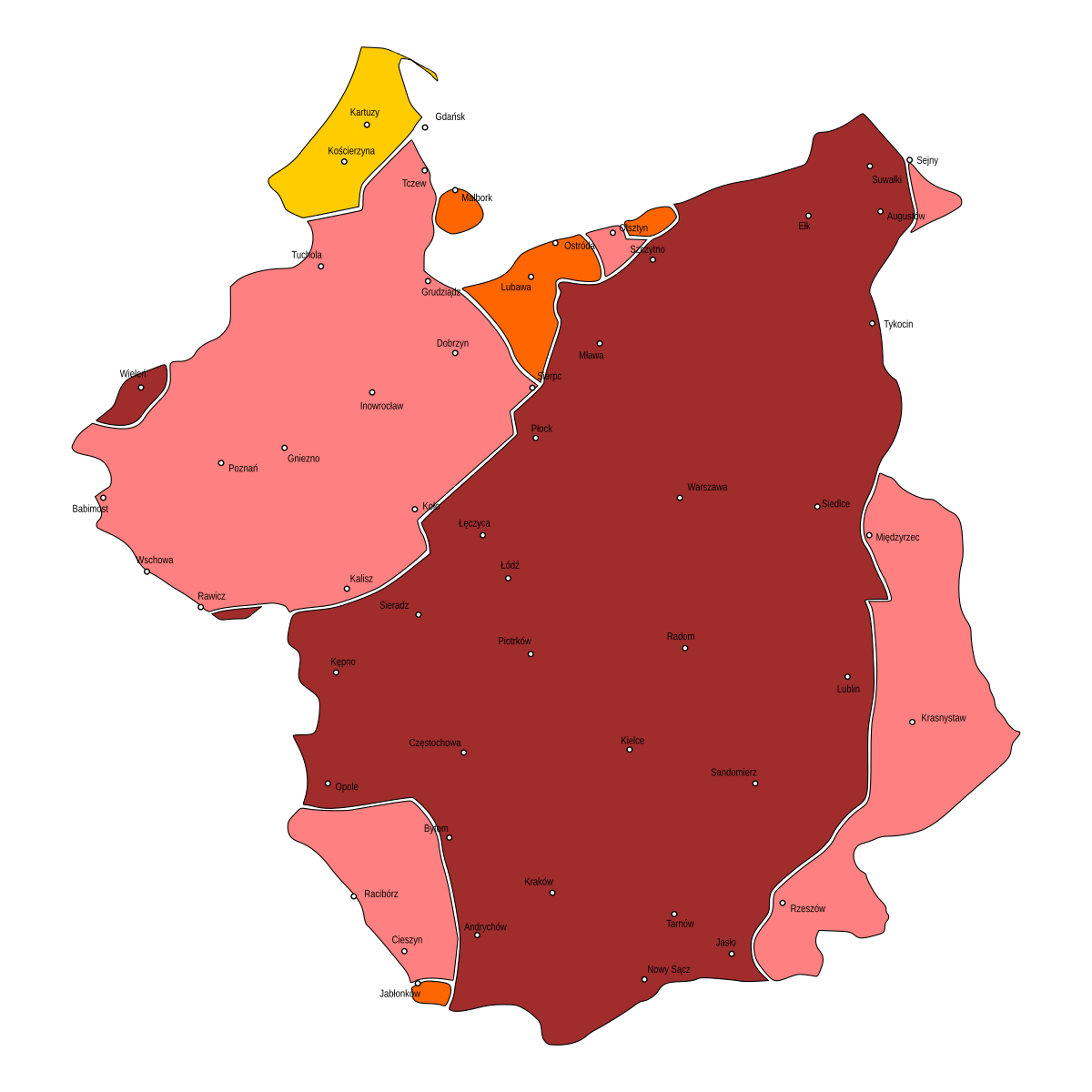
Pronunciation of sibilants in Polish dialects. Standard pronunciation (/s.../–/ʂ.../–/ɕ.../ distinction) Mazurzenie (/s.../–/ʂ.../ merger) Jabłonkowanie (/ʂ.../–/ɕ.../ merger) Kaszubienie (/s.../–/ɕ.../ merger)

Many dialects on the edges of dialect groups show traits belonging to the groups it borders, and are usually classified as transitional dialects, whose exact classification is often debated.

=== Regional Polish ===
Regional Polish (polszczyzna regionalna), also known as regionalisms (regionalizmy), consists of local elements of the Polish language based on Standard Polish, spoken primarily but not only in cities, often colloquially called urban dialects. Unlike folk dialects, which are spoken by people descended from peasants and the urban underclass, regionalisms are used by members of all social classes and are sometimes seen as acceptable literary forms, like the Kraków-Poznań pronunciation. Unlike accents in English, where the main differences come from pronunciation, the primary distinctions here emerge from grammar, vocabulary, and accentuation, making them less distinct than dialects. Some people classify Standard Polish-dialectal mixed forms as parts of regionalisms and categorize them based on region as opposed to city. Notable regionalisms include:

- Kraków regionalisms
- Poznań regionalisms
- Warsaw regionalisms
- Białystok regionalisms
- Bydgoszcz regionalisms
- Silesian regionalisms (Silesian inluence standard Polish)
- Lwów cultural dialect

=== Greater Poland dialect group ===
Descended from the Western Slavic language spoken by the Polans, the dialects are:

- Kociewie dialect
- Bory Tucholskie dialect
- Krajna dialect
- Chełmno-Dobrzyń dialect
- Kujawy dialect
- Northern Greater Poland dialect
- Western Greater Poland dialect
- Central Greater Poland dialect
- Eastern Greater Poland dialect
- Southern Greater Poland dialect

=== Masovian dialect group ===
Descended from the language of the Masovians, the dialects are:

- Lubawa dialect
- Ostróda dialect
- Warmia dialect
- Masurian dialects
- Kurpie dialect
- Łowicz dialect
- Near Masovian dialect
- Far Masovian dialect
- Suwałki dialect
- Podlachia dialect
- Warsaw dialect

=== Lesser Poland dialect group ===
Descended from the language of the Vistulans, is the most numerous dialectal group in modern Poland. the dialects are:

- Łęczyca dialect
- Sieradz dialect
- Masovian Borderland dialect
- Kielce dialect
- Western Kraków dialect
- Lasovia dialect
- Eastern Kraków dialect
- Carpathian-Pogórze Lach dialects

- Podegrodzie dialect
- Limanowa dialect

- Western Lublin dialect
- Eastern Lublin dialect
- Przemyśl dialect
- Lwów dialect
- Biecz dialect

The Goral ethnolect (the name for the many dialects spoken by Gorals in Western Carpathians bordering Poland and Slovakia), which include:

- Carpathian-Podgórze Goral dialects

- Babia Góra dialect
- Kliszczak dialect
- Pieniny dialect
- Łącko dialect
- Piwniczna dialect

- Żywiec dialect
- Orawa dialect
- Podhale dialect
- Spisz dialect
- Zagórze dialect
- Kysuce dialect
- Ochotnica dialect
- Liptov dialect (not to be confused with the Slovak Liptov dialect)
- Bukovinian dialect

The dialects spoken by Silesian Gorals are considered closer Silesian but are referred to as Goral by Silesian Gorals in Poland, due to them feeling more Goral than Silesian. Silesian Gorals in Zaolzie usually consider themselves more Silesian and are more likely to call it Silesian.

=== Northern Borderlands dialect ===
In modern times the dialect is still spoken mainly by the Polish minorities in Lithuania and in northwestern Belarus.

- Wilno dialect (Polish: gwara wileńska)

=== Southern Borderlands dialect ===
Often considered a derivative of a mixture of Old Polish and Old Ruthenian, as was spoken in Red Ruthenia in the Middle Ages. See especially, the Lwów dialect, (Polish: gwara lwowska)

=== New mixed dialects ===
- Northern new mixed dialect
- Northwestern new mixed dialect
- Southern new mixed dialect

=== Silesian ===
Silesian (Silesian: ślōnskŏ gŏdka, Polish: język śląski, dialekt śląski) is a lect spoken in the regions of Upper Silesia. Some regard it as one of the four major dialects of Polish, while others classify it as a separate regional language, distinct from Polish. Many Silesians consider themselves a separate ethnicity and have been advocating the recognition of Silesian as a distinct language. In the 2021 Polish census, about 460 thousand people declared that they speak Silesian.

Language organizations such as SIL International and various linguistic resources such as Ethnologue recognize Silesian as a distinct language. In 2007, Silesian was assigned its language code szl within the ISO 639-3 standard.

Those who regard Silesian as a separate language tend to include the Lach dialects (Polish: gwary laskie) of the Czech Republic as part of this language. However, other linguistic sources on Slavic languages normally describe them as dialects of the Czech language, or sometimes as transitional Polish–Czech dialects.

For a list of dialects, see dialects of Silesian.

== Common isoglosses ==
Dialects are often divided based on isoglosses in pronunciation, grammar (namely declension and syntax), and word-formation.

In terms of the most important, dialect groups are usually divided based on the presence of masuration (present in Masovian and Lesser Polish dialects) and voicing of word-final consonants before vowels and liquids in the next word or sometimes the personal verb clitics -m, -ś, -śmy, -ście as in byliśmy (e.g. jak jestem may be realized as Polish pronunciation: [[jaɡ jestem]] in Lesser Polish and Greater Polish dialects, but as Polish pronunciation: [[jak jestem]] in Masovia).

Common phonetic isoglosses in terms of vowels include the development of slanted vowels, or their retention; and the treatment of nasal vowels.

Common phonetic isoglosses in terms of consonants include Jabłonkowanie, Siakanie, Szadzenie, and the insertion of prothetic consonants before initial (and sometimes medial) vowels.

Another important factor is the presence of contracted forms of bać and similar verbs (regionally and originally bojeć).

A common grammatical isogloss is the formation of first-person plural verb forms, which in Standard Polish is usually with -my in the present/future tense or with -śmy in the past tense. Many dialects show much variation, including ‑m, ‑ma, ‑me, ‑wa.

A common lexical or word-formation isogloss is how nouns denoting young animals and people are formed, where in the south and in Standard Polish it is typically formed with -ę, as in źrebię, but in the north it is often -ak, as in źrebiak. Both suffixes are subject sound changes.

A common isogloss in verb formation is the preferred ending for imperfective or frequentative verbs; in Standard Polish and the north they are usually formed with -ywać, but in the south -ować is often preferred. Also important is the formation of adjectives, with many different suffixes being used in different regions that are usually different from the formation in Standard Polish.
