= Podhale dialect =

Dialect of Polish spoken in Poland

- Native to: Poland
- Region: Podhale
- Language family: Indo-European: Balto-Slavic; Slavic; West Slavic; Lechitic; Polish; Lesser Polish; Podhale dialect

Language codes
- ISO 639-3: –

The Podhale dialect (Polish: gwara podhalańska) belongs to the Lesser Poland dialect group and is located in the part of Poland. It is in part one of the dialects that belongs to the Goral ethnolect. It borders the Orawa dialect to the west, the Kliszczak dialect to the north, and the Spisz dialect and Zagórze dialect to the east.

== Phonology ==
Typical of Lesser Polish dialects (as well as Greater Polish dialects), voicing of word-final consonants before vowels and liquids is present here. Also typical of Lesser Polish dialects is the presence of mazuration. Initial accent is found here: ‘pôwiadajom (powia’dają).

=== Vowels ===
i is retained after rz, which is pronounced as y in Standard Polish, or may shift to ś, ‘warziwa (warzywa), psinieśli (przynieśli). Most famously, the so-called “Podhalanian archaism” is present here; after etymological cz, ż, sz (now c, z, s) as well as after etymological cy, zy, sy, i is retained, which is the original pronunciation: dzisiyjs-im (dzisiejszym). This is also present in loanwords: bic-igiel. However, before ł and l, i shifts to y, both heterosyllabically and tautosyllabically, regardless of the Podhalanian archaism: strzelył (strzelił), naucył mie (nauczył mnie). Often ablaut is levelled: mietła, wiesna (miotła, wiosna).

==== Slanted vowels ====
Slanted vowels are generally retained: górále (górale), however it is quickly merging with o, notably without labialization. Slanted é has merged with y after both hard and soft consonants: biyda (bieda). Slanted ó is retained as ó: górále.

==== Nasal vowels ====
Nasal vowels retain nasality word-medially before sibilants, otherwise ę is decomposed into yN and ą into oN. In the past tense of verbs ending in -ąć, -on, -yn is common: wzion, wziyna (wziął, wzięłą). Word-final nasals’ realizations can vary depending on their morphological characteristics. Final -ę is realized as -ym in the first-person present/future singular of verbs: widzym (widzę), as -e in the accusative singular of feminine nouns that end in historical jasne a in the nominative: babe (babę), but -om for feminine nouns that historically ended in slanted -á in the nominative: odbyć msom świyntom (odbyć mszę świętą). Final -ą is realized as -om in the third person present/future plural of verbs: zapuscajom (zapuszczajom), and in the accusative and instrumental singular of feminine adjectives, numerals, and pronouns: w drugom strone (w drugą stronę); przed drugom wojnom (przed drugą wojną).

==== Prothesis ====
o typically labializes word-initially to ô and also sometimes medially. Initial a sometimes has a prothetic h, and prothetic j is also found initially and medially before various vowels; these latter two processes are generally restricted to certain words.

=== Consonants ===
Word-final -ch shifts to -k in the locative plural of nouns: ‘pô pôtôkak (po ptakach); the genitive/locative plural of adjectives, numerals, and pronouns: drugik (drugich); the first person past (aorist) singular of verbs: byłek (byłem). This also occurs in stem-final -ch: duk (duch), the particle niek (niech). Initial ch- shifts to k- in clusters in certain words: krzciny (chrzciny). ch- shifts to f- in the verb chcieć: nie fce (nie chce). Dark ł was present more commonly in the past, but in younger generations is replaced with /w/.

== Inflection ==
Typical Goral inflectional traits are found here.

=== Adjectives, adverbs, pronouns, and numerals ===
The genitive of numerals is typically levelled to -ik or -uk: siedmik lot (siedmiu lat), do trzidziestuk piynciu stopni (do trzydziestu pięciu stopni).

== Vocabulary ==
=== Word-Formation ===
Typical Goral word-formation tendencies can be seen here.

==== Nouns ====
The noun-forming suffixes -acka (-aczka) and -ba are more common here: sarpacka (szarpaczka) ‘szamotanina, rękoczyny’, chciyjba ‘chcenie, chęć’.

==== Verbs ====
Verbs containing -á- create the passive participle with -t-: siáty (siany).

== See also ==
- Dialects of the Polish language
- Languages of Europe
- Polish language
