= Masovian Borderland dialect =

Dialect of Polish spoken in Poland

- Native to: Poland
- Region: Northern Lesser Poland
- Language family: Indo-European: Balto-Slavic; Slavic; West Slavic; Lechitic; Polish; Lesser Polish; Masovian Borderland dialect

Language codes
- ISO 639-3: –

The Masovian Borderland dialect (Polish: gwary pogranicza mazowieckiego) belongs to the Lesser Poland dialect group and is located in the central part of Poland. It borders the Kielce dialect to the south, the Łęczyca dialect to the east, the Western Lublin dialect, Masovian Łowicz dialect to the northeast, and the Near Mazovian dialect to the north. Similar to Łęczyca and Sieradz, influences from many dialect regions can be seen here. It encompasses the southwestern regions of historic Masovia and the central part of northern Lesser Poland, extending to the Pilica River in the north and the Vistula River in the east; the southern border runs along a line from Piotrków Trybunalski, Radom, and Puławy. This dialect is a transitional dialect between Lesser Poland and Masovia.

== Phonology ==
Atypical of Lesser Polish dialects, devoicing of word-final consonants before vowels and liquids is present here, except in the masculine past tense: brat ożeniuł się; nie mógem (nie mogłem). More typical of Lesser Polish dialects is the presence of mazurzenie, as well as siakanie (kosiula) and sometimes even szadzenie (nażywaly (nazywali)).

The greatest number of dialectal features are preserved in the phonology - there exists a tendency to eliminate dialectal phonetic realizations seen in hypercorrect forms which occur more frequently due to the borderline location dialect causing a mixture of different pronunciations, with those consistent with the general Polish norm being preferred.

Ablaut of 'e|'o is often missing, most often in verb stems: biere (biorę), ubiere sie, podniese się, zgnietły, wlekła, przyniesła, przywiezły; also in do siestry, zamietło się, pomietło się; żeniato, nieżeniato; w Kociełkach, w kosienkach, Pietrek, bierã (biorę).

Traces of -ew-|-ow- can be seen mostly in the toponym do Głowaczewa.

Mobile e is sometimes inserted: kiosek, wiater, kalesony leniane, obrusek liniany, po Kacperze, bober (bóbr), meter (metr), Pioter (Piotr) or can be removed due to hypercorrection: swetr.

=== Vowels ===
Clear a is realized as a. The group ra- is shifted to re- in a few lexicalized terms under Masovian influence: redło, redlić, obredlić, zaredlić, redliny; a shift of ja- > je- does not occur, but tautosyllabic aj can change to ej: dzisiej, tutej, but daj is realized as in standard Polish. Clear e is generally realized as e, but under certain conditions can raise to y or i. Clear o is generally realized as o, but the terms ktuś, cuś, chuć show raising and the imperatives chódź, nie wychódź, pszychódź. Clear o can also raise before r, l, b: doktór, do kumury, pomidury, cekulada, marmulada, samuloty, rubota, ubora, z Bubrownik or in the terms kukartka, skudnik, zazdrusce, and possibly via analogy to młócić the terms młócka, omłóty.

The cluster -ir- does not always lower: pirszy, wirzch, sirp, smirć.

Via leveling or potentially hypercorrection, u can change to o: sprobować, wlok się, ros. The adjective from Brzóza is commonly realized as brzyski perhaps due to assimilation to the soft k' in -ski.

The vowels i and y can lower to e before liquids l, r, n, ń, m: dengus, do Gorenia gościeniec, lenija, w Jedleńsku. In the north, i and y are very inconsistent, and often one replaces the other, especially in the north.

==== Slanted vowels ====
Slanted vowels are generally perceived as dialectal, and as such their raised pronunciations are generally avoided.

Slanted á is rarely realized as o, but is generally realized as clear a, it may occur in the masculine singular past tense or imperative: czekoł, pogniwołem sie, pracowołeś, nie pytoj sie; in adjectival declension: jencmianno kasa, tako murowano piwnica, pierszo komunia, siódmo klasa; feminine surnames or forms derived from husbands' names: Koralesko, Stefanowo, Chrostowo, Zakrzesko; verb stems: godać, kozać, lotać, porozmowiać, spolić, zoboczyć; nominal stems: dziod, kawoł, kwost, nosienie, połka, sadzowka, śniodanie; the suffixes -ak, -arz: chojok, kusoki, faryniorz, dyngusiorze, Krześniok (surname), Woźniok (surname); personal pronuns: jo, nos, wos; and adverbs: dzisioj, nieroz, teroz, zaro. Realization of á as o is less frequent in the superlative prefix naj-: nojkrótszy, nojzdrowszy and also less often in the feminine nominative singular of nouns: ta kaso jencmianno, ta snowadlo. Hypercorrections of etymological o to a also occur: wdawiec (wdowiec); welan (welon).

Slanted é raises more often than slanted á to either y (after hard consonants) or i (after soft consonants), however, lé shows fluctuation: chlib||chlyb, mliki||mlyko, talirz||talyrz; raising occurs in: the infinitive of -eć verbs: popaczszyć, chcić, lecić, siedzić; the comparative and superlative of adjectives and adverbs: gorzy, lepi, dawni, więcy; oblique forms of feminine adjectival declension: do ty polowy kuchni, po lewy strunie, taki krótki sukienki; verb stems: ubirać się, rozlygać się, spacyrować, śpiwać; nominal stems: bida, dziń dobry, mliko, syrokość, piniendze, kawalir, Liwaszówka (Lewaszówka); and personal and possessive pronouns: przyglundoł się ji, mieszkałam u ni, u twoji babci. The words tyż, rozumisz, umisz, wisz, dopiro, pirw, trochy, inaczy, and raczy tend to show similar raising; raising occurs less often in nie, nie-: ni moge, nichtóre, Nimce, nimodne

Slanted ó is realized as u.

==== Nasal vowels ====
The cluster aN may raise to uN: dum, godum, kolezunka, mum, num, obirum, pamientum, pytom, schowum, sum, szukum, wracum, wum, wyczszymuł (wytrzymał), wydum. The cluster eN sporadically lowers (also sometimes to [æ]): lan (len), manażki (menażki), but more often remains as eN as in standard Polish: ten, jeden, ciemny, pszenica. The cluster oN generally raises to uN, but oN can also be seen: bruny, bumba, zadzwunić. The cluster uN (especially un) sporadically lowers to oN: gront.

The nasal vowelś ą, ę tend to decompose except before sibilants: bende, ksiunc, kuńdziel, munka but gąszcz, gęsi, gęsty, język, mąsz, wąski. Medial -ą- tends to raise to uN, including sometimes before sibilants: ciungnik, gołumpki, lezuncy, sumsiatka, wjunzać, Ślunzak. Word final -ą can be either -um or -u depending on the morphological context, but generally raises and does so consistently. Medial -ę- is generally realized like in standard Polish, that is as -eN- or -ę-: gęsi, język, peńdzić, tempy, zemby; word final -ę is realized as -e as in standard Polish: (ja) śmieje sie, boje sie, (czytam) te ksionszke, (zamykam) brame, but sometimes nasality is kept as -ę or -ã.

Denaslization occurs in future forms of być: bede, bedzies, bedzie and the terms chumoto (chomąto) and Mukosy (Mąkosy); secondary nasalization occurs in terms like Cencelówka (Cecylówka), angryst, anklirz, mienszać, przyjmnońć, rozjarznić, zadowolnienie, zadowolniuny.

==== Contraction ====
Uncontracted forms occur and dominate: bojać się i stojać. Latinate -ija/-yja words do not shorten: akacyja, harmunija.

==== Prothesis ====
Initial o- labializes to ô-: ôkno, ô mnie, ôd południa; medial -o- can also labialize: baôr, Bôże, Leônka, obôrać, robôta, samôloty, swôje, wôjna, wôjsko, wôzu (wożą), wôda; initial u- also labializes to û-: ûciekać, ûn, ûna, ûny; medial -u- can also labialize: poûmierali, poûkładane; hypercorrection can occur: Były tam użka (łóżka) pientrowe; Aż stond było widać ten pożar, jednolyta una (łuna). Initial i- often and less often initial a-, e- gain prothetic j-: jidzie, Jagata, Jantek, Janielcia, Jewcia, jale, jakurat.

=== Consonants ===
Masuration is generally present: barsc, zniwa, but given that Masuration is a dialectal feature heavily marked in the minds of speakers, it's often avoided, resulting in a very uneven distribution of these realizations, and for some speakers it occurs very little and for others predominately; an example of a hypercorrection is szmalec (smalec). A similar process that occurs in the region is Jabłonkowanie: kasiel (kaszel) - it occurs here irregularly, most often in loanwords (ziandarm) or in consonant clusters (ślachetny, śfarować, śnurek, śpital, śprechać) or as a result of assimilation (straśnie, beśpiecnie, źniwa, śliśmy, pośliśmy).

A common feature of the realization of l as hard as the result of Masovian influence; this feature stands out less in the minds of speakers and as such is harder to avoid: blyny, blysko, cierlyca, glyna.

The velars k, g, have hardened: kedy, and ch is often softened: muchi (muchy), marchiew (marchew).

Common to Lesser Poland dialects is the gemination of s, ś, sz: na bosso/ na bossoka, wiśsieć, powjeśsić, wywjeśsić, wjeszszak; do lassu.

Soft labials tend to decompose as in Masovian dialects: bjały, kobjeta, mjeszkanie, pjasek, pjerszy, wjeczór; this can lead to hypercorrection of ń > m (as in many dialects that do this change ḿ > ń): micielnica (nicielnica), mitka (nitka), Miziński (Niziński), misko (nisko). The cluster śẃ hardens in the word śwynia, common in Masovia; this does not occur in other words.

The clusters trz-, strz- tend to simplify: paczsze (patrzę), powjeczsze (powietrze), poczebne (potrzebne); rs, rś, rsz can simplify to sz: baszc (barszcz), gosztki (garstki), gaszć (garść) oraz wasztat (warsztat); word-final -kł, -dł, -gł, -bł, -rł, -jn, -ść or -zn lose their final consonant: wyblak, posed, podlaz, ûmar, zasłab; paś, męszczyz, kombaj; medial and initial clusters can simplify, e.g. -błk- > -pk-: japko; -bw- > -b-: obarzanki; chł- > ch-: chopak; -dlń- > -lń- or (less often) -dń-: Jelnia/Jednia (Jedlnia); gdź- > dź-: dzie; -lk- > -l-: tylo; -nd- > -d-: fudament; -ng- > -g-: kontygent; -stk- > -sk- : fszysko; -rk > -k: jarmak; -rnk- > -rk-: garki; -rwsz- > -rsz- : pjerszy; -tć- > -ć-: w gecie ‘w getcie’; -wsk- > -sk-: Zakszeski (Zakrzewski); and wzr- > zr-: zruszyć sie.

Assimilation can occur in some words: Kaspszycki (Kacprzycki), smentarz (cmentarz), srebło (srebro), zrucać (zrzucać), jednostalnie (jednostajnie), jajesznica (jajecznica). More common is dissimilation: chtoś, chtóry, nicht, dochtór, mjentkie (miękkie), letko (lekko), mgleć (mdleć), mgły (mdły), czostku (czosnku), długszy (dłuższy); kfolyć (chwalić), kwarde (twarde), krzest (chrzest), zachład (zakład).

The cluster źr- can occur as rz- as in Lesser Poland: dorzieć, urzieć, oberzieć się.

== Inflection ==
Influence from Masovian and Lesser Polish dialects can be seen.

=== Nouns ===
The dative plural is most regularly -um due to sound changes: gospodarzum, krowum. The feminine accusative-instrumental singular can be realized as -um or -u: Tatuś z mojum siostrum sztarszum, pot tum letnium kuchnium; pot podłogu. The instrumental plural ending can harden to -amy: kartoflamy, kuńmy. The genitive singular of masculine nouns often differs: do doma, do roga, do lasa, do samochoda next to tego śfjatu, tego transformatoru. The genitive plural may be formed with -ów for all genders as this ending is seen as more distinct: bapków, jajków. However, -y or -∅ can occur in place of -ów: widelcy, palcy, widelcy, palcy. The locative singular can be formed with -e instead of -u as the result of Masuration: w krzyzie, w kapelusie. This can occasionally happen in the neuter, but -u is preferred. The instrumental plural of ręka is rencami. The nominative plural -a is somewhat kept: te kontengenta, te instrumenta, te pulsa. Masculine personal nouns are often leveled to masculine animal: te syny, te kawalery, te muzykanty, te partyzanty, te pasierby; te Niemce, te gajowe, te wuje, te ojce; te kolegi, te niewolniki, te hydrauliki. The genitive may replace the accusative for non-masculine personal nouns: Ona wszystkich tych kobit wyprowadziła; Te chłopoki lepi brały tych kobit, bo były dobre tancerki or the opposite: W ramieniu dostał ból; dostał zawał. A small number of nouns differ in gender or in the nominative: ta ryzyka (to ryzyko), ten więzień (to więzienie), ta kontrol (ta kontrola), ten łączek (ta łączka), to brzucho (ten brzuch), brukwia (brukiew), brwa (brew). A common masculine dative singular ending is -oji, and for neuter -u is most common. The genitive singular of feminine nouns ending in a soft consonant is -e. Feminine nouns ending in -o (-á) take -ą in the accusative singular, otherwise -a is used for the accusative singular of feminine nouns.

=== Adjectives, adverbs, pronouns, and numerals ===
The masculine-neuter instrumental singular can be -em due to sound changes: broń była czemś poszukiwanem, szedł jeden z drugiem, nat takiem stawem, pod gołem niebem. The feminine accusative-instrumental singular can be realized as -um or -u (more often in the accusative): Tatuś z mojum siostrum sztarszum, pot tum letnium kuchnium; w kazdu jednu chałupe; pot podłogu. The enclitic pronominal form mi can harden: dawoł my cukierki. The pronominal form mnie can rarely be realized as me: zamknij me gdzie. The comparative and superlative ending of adverbs -ej raises to -y, -i: niży, dali, lepi. The adverbs teraz, zaraz, dzisiaj can be realized as tera, zaro, dzisia. The dative form of the reflexive verb is most often realized as se. In adjectives and pronouns, the masculine/neuter genitive singular may formed with -igo (after soft consonants)/-ygo (after hard consonants), eotherwise -ego. The masculine/neuter instrumental/locative singular is typically -am, and the dative plural is -am as well. The dual of pronouns is retained here relatively well: do naju (do nas), do waju (do was), numa (nam).

=== Verbs ===
The passive adjectival participle is generally -uny due to sound changes: gnieciune. The masculine past tense of -ić, -yć verbs can change to -u- due to sound changes: chodziułem, przeżułem (przeżyłem) but feminine robiła, kupiła. The third person plural present tense ending can be realized as -u or less often -um: godaju, jadu; majum, mówiom. The third person singular present tense of być may be realized as je. The infinitive of -eć verbs is usually -yć/-ić: lecić. The archaic dual ending -wa can be seen as a first person plural ending: bedziewa zyc; pojedziewa; pojechaliźwa; złapalyźwa. The second person plural may be formed with either -cie or -ta (from the old dual ending): polotaliśta, jakśta brali, zebyśta se pojedli, pamjentojta, but exclusively -cie is used for forms of respect: Wy, Jóśkowo, jak chlep upjeczecie. Verbs ending in -ąć, -nąć build the past tense with -n-: wzion, wzienam; cion, cieno sie; najon, najeni, przyjun, wyzeno sie ‘wyżęło się’; zacena, zaceni; zdjun. The imperative may be -oj instead of -aj due to sound changes. The verb jeść has an exceptional declension: jjem, jjys, jjy, jjamy, jjyta. The personal past clitics -em/-am tend to be homophonous here due to fronting: ja widziałem/widziałam. The past tense may also be built without clitics: jo buł (byłem). The present tense first person plural can be built with either -amy (where the a can front) (from Lesser Polish) or -em/-im (from Masovian).

=== Prepositions and prefixes ===
Common is the extension of the prepositions/prefixes w(-), z(-) (and other prefixes) with mobile e to we(-), ze(-): we dwóch miejscach, we słume, we wieś, ze lnu, ze sześć, ze siedem, ze roboty; rozezłościła sie, odeszed, weszed, zegrane - this happens most often due to dissimilation to prevent sounds from merging during articulation or for ease of pronunciation, when a word begins with a consonant cluster. Prepositional phrases can differ: po zaokniu (za oknami), po zastodolu (za stodołami), na zapiecu (za piecem), na pościaniu (pod ścianami), s ty nadwisły (znad Wisły).

== Vocabulary ==
=== Word-Formation ===
Noun formation tendencies are more typical for a Lesser Polish dialect, with some influence from Masovian.

==== Nouns ====
Common in this dialect is the formation of surnames for wives, sons, and daughters from the surnames for husbands or fathers. Surnames for wives can be formed with -owo (sometimes realized as -owa): Paluszkowo (< Paluszek), or -kowo from diminutive -ek forms: Adamkowo (< Adamek, diminutive of Adam) - these forms are also added after the husband's surname where they function to specify the person in the conditions of a rural community where many surnames are repeated: Nizińsko Heńkowo. Nizińsko Heńkowo; another ending for wives' surnames is -ina/-yna Giemzina (< Giemza), Miozdzyno (< Miazga), and -ka: Bajórka (< Bajór). Surnames for daughters can be formed with -unka (< -anka): Jaszczempcunka (< Jastrzębska), -ówna: Kulikówna (< Kulik), and -icha/-ycha (also used for wives): Oguńcycha (< Ogonek); the genitive of the father's surname can also be used: Maryśka Kieszkoskiego. Surnames for sons are created with -ok (< -ak): Chrościok (< Chrost); in the plural this ending can also be used for collectives: Kutyloki (< Kutyła). A surname for a son can also be built from the given name with the genitive form of the surname in the plural: Stacho Ałdasiów. The ending -owy can be used for sons and -owa for daughters: Heniek Krupowy, Adamowa Monika; in the plural it is used for collectives: Starzykowe (< Starzyk). Surnames from surnames for mothers can rarely be formed with -in/-yn (masculine) or -ina/-yna (feminine): Tomek Halyncyn (< Halina), Teresa Jaścyna (< Jaśka).

Diminutives occur more frequently here, often expressive, and are not always used for endearing purposes, and double diminutives occur more frequently: balijka, chałupka, kartofelki, kościółek, parafijka, powrósełko, rentka, sianko, słomka, zieńciosek (zięć), kszesełecko. Similarly, augmentatives occur more frequently and do not always have a negative connotation: chłopacysko, dziewucha, dziewusysko, pannica, wełnisko.

Words for young animals and people are more commonly formed with -ok||-ak than -ę: cielok, dzieciok, prosiak, źrebok; this suffix is also used for demonyms: ursyniak, names of dishes: marchwiak (carrot cake), or other nouns: chojak, pomywak, wozak. Other common noun-forming suffixes include -ina/-yna (often giving words a shade of pity, and sometimes contempt or disregard): bidzina, chłopacyna; -ka for actions or tools: kijanka, lepka and the extended -aczka: bujaczka.

Words for family members sometimes end in -o: stryjo, teścio, dziadzio.

=== Adjectives, adverbs, and pronouns ===
Adjectives and adverbs diminutize more frequently: bielutki, calusieńki; malutko, raniutko, wunziutko. The adverb naokoło is formed as naobkoło. Adverbs are often strengthened with -k: jeszczek, którendyk, musik, póź- nik, skundścik, tendyk, wprzódyk; similarly, some words are extended with -oj: nicegoj, nikogój, takoj, tamoj. Common adjective endings include -ny, -asty, and -aty: talentny (utalentowany), amatorny (mający wielu amatorów), minny (robiący miny), wóz drabniasty, ząb korzeniasty, nieżeniato, mężato. The possessive adjectival endings -in/-yn and -owy occur: Krysine chłopoki, matcyna rodzina, mamusina matka, po mamusiny śmierci, cypkowe piniendze, furman wsiowy. Multiplicative denumeral adjectives are formed with -isty: troisty.

=== Verbs ===
The prefix ob- is often used, especially instead of o- as it is felt as more distinct: obganiać, oblenić się; deverbal obstoje (postoje). The distribution of verbal prefixes may differ. Both -ywać and -ować for frequentatives are present here, where -ywać is more common in the north. Sometimes -ać is used instead of either.

== Syntax ==
Masculine personal is generally leveled to masculine animal: Poszły te chłopy tych kartofly ôdkopywać; the masculine animal plural is sometimes used as a form of respect: Dziadek nieras jag zakasłały; conversely, groups of women might use masculine personal forms: Kobjety mjeli roboty, na drutach robili swetry, przendli ze lnu.

The plural in general is often used as a form of respect: tatuś nanosili dżrzewa, mama tych kartofly ugotowali, dziadek weszły do pjeca, słuchojcie, Adamku. Another expression of respect is the avoidance of personal verb forms and the use of the infinitive: Stryju, pograć no, pośpiwać, na tem lystku cy na grzebyku. All of these methods are commonly used, including younger people.

Verb clitics are more mobile than in standard Polish: Jusśmy nie uciekali daleko, tylko w lasśmy uciekali, and clitics can also occur as the first part of a sentence: wie brało i sie wychodziło za mąż; śmy się wprowadzili. The possessive genitive occurs before the noun more often than in standard Polish: moja siostra czyli mamy córka.

The prepositions bez and przez are often confused: już nie pszeczytum przez łokularóf; bez wakacje tośmy zrobili drugu klase.

== See also ==
- Dialects of the Polish language
- Languages of Europe
- Polish language

== Bibliography ==
- Karaś, Halina (2010). "Pogranicze Mazowsza". www.dialektologia.uw.edu.pl.
- Garczyńska, Justyna (2010). "Pogranicze Mazowsza – gwara regionu". www.dialektologia.uw.edu.pl.
- Kapusta, Małgorzata (2017). Mowa mieszkańców pogranicza Mazowsza (na przykładzie gminy Głowaczów w powiecie kozienickim) (in Polish). Warsaw: Elipsa. ISBN 978-83-8017-167-1.
