= Orawa dialect =

Dialect of Polish spoken in Poland

- Native to: Poland
- Region: Orawa
- Language family: Indo-European: Balto-Slavic; Slavic; West Slavic; Lechitic; Polish; Lesser Polish; Orawa dialect

Language codes
- ISO 639-3: –

The Orawa dialect (Polish: gwara orawska) belongs to the Lesser Poland dialect group and is located in part of Poland and Slovakia. It is in part one of the dialects that belongs to the Goral ethnolect. It borders the Żywiec dialect to the far northwest, the Babia Góra dialect to the north, and the Podhale dialect to the east. The Orawa dialect is partially found in Poland with 14 settlements, and partially found in Slovakia with 11. The use of dialect here is strong, and the effects of Standard Polish are weaker than in other regions.

While many Polish linguists describe the Orawa dialect as a variety of Lesser Poland Polish, some Slovak linguists argue that the Orawa speech forms constitute a Polish–Slovak transitional dialect. According to this view, the dialect has a Lesser Poland (Polish) origin, but through long-term and intensive contact with Slovak-speaking populations, especially within the historical context of the Kingdom of Hungary, it has developed numerous Slovak phonological, morphological, and syntactic features, resulting in a transitional character between Polish and Slovak.

== Phonology ==
Typical of Lesser Polish dialects (as well as Greater Polish dialects), voicing of word-final consonants before vowels and liquids is present here. Also typical of Lesser Polish dialects is the presence of mazuration. Initial accent is common here.

=== Vowels ===
Ablaut is often levelled: mietła (miotła).

==== Slanted vowels ====
Slanted vowels are generally retained: tráwa (trawa), wóz (in Stan. Pol. pronounced as wuz, here as wóz), and é has merged with y after both hard and soft consonants: śniyg (śnieg).

==== Nasal vowels ====
Nasals decompose from é > yN and ą > oN medially before non-sibilants, but retain nasality before sibilants. Verbs ending in -ąć end in -yn-, -on in the past tense: wzion (wziął), wziyna (wzięła). -ę word-finally changes to -ym in the first-person present/future of verbs: słysym (słyszę), as -e in the feminine accusative singular of nouns ending in historic jasne -a studnie (studnię); however feminine nouns ending in historic -á take -á/-o in the accusative singular: na msá (na mszę), where -á is a facultative variant. Final -ą is realized as -o (or optionally as -á) in the third person plural present/future forms of verbs: widzo (widzą), włozá (wożą) and in the accusative singular of feminine adjectives, numerals, and pronouns: staro babe (starą babę), na drugá dziedzine (na drugą dziedzinę (wieś), but as -om in the instrumental singular of feminine nouns, adjectives, numerals, and pronouns z mojom drugom babom (z moją drugą babą) as the result of morphologization.

==== Prothesis ====
o is very often labialized to ô, not only initially or after velars and labials, but after other consonants as well. In the Slovakian area prothetic w (/v/) is common instead of /w/. Less commonly prothetic j, or even more rarely h, may also occur before initial a.

=== Consonants ===
Final -ch shifts to -k in the locative plural of nouns: w ôbłok (<oboch) kóńcak w obu końcach, the genitive/locative plural of adjectives, numerals, and pronouns: staryk ludzi (starych ludzi); the first person past (aorist) singular: byłek (byłem), pytałak (pytałam), the hortative particle niek (niech), and initially in certain words in clusters: krzest (chrzest). This does not typically occur in stems, where ch is either more weakly pronounced or lost: na wiyr przichodziyło) (na wierzch przychodzi), daᶜʰ (but: dachu), me (mech). -ść/-źć, -rzć usually reduce to -ś: niyś (nieść) sierz (genitive sierzci) (sierść). Dark ł can be heard here, and soft l’ is retained before not only i: l’as (las). ił, il shifts to ył, yl heterosyllabically: rłobiyli (robili) and to ół, ól tautosyllabically: strzelół.. Similarly, raised rz can also be heard here amongst the older speakers: drżewo (normally d-żewo). i after rz is retained here: trżi grżiby (trzy grzyby). Bilabial w is retained amongst the older speakers.

== Inflection ==
Typical Goral inflectional tendencies are found here.

=== Nouns ===
Soft feminine nouns retain -e in the genitive singular: dło smyreka cy do jedle (do smreka czy do jodły).

=== Adjectives and adverbs ===
Numerals often use -ik, -uk insteach of -u in declensions: do piyncik roków, po śterdzierdziestuk rłokak.

=== Verbs ===
Verbs containing -á- create the passive participle with -t-: siáty (siany).

== See also ==
- Dialects of the Polish language
- Languages of Europe
- Polish language
