= Bukovinian Polish dialect =

Dialect of Polish spoken in Bukovina

Bukovinian Polish
- Native to: Romania, Ukraine
- Region: Bukovina
- Language family: Indo-European: Balto-Slavic; Slavic; West Slavic; Lechitic; Polish; Lesser Polish; Bukovinian Polish

Language codes
- ISO 639-3: –

The Bukovinian dialect (Polish: gwara bukowińska) belongs to the Lesser Poland dialect group and is spoken in the region of Bukovina. It is in part one of the dialects that belongs to the Goral ethnolect. It has had much contact with Slovak, Ukrainian, Russian, German, and Romanian. It also shows strong influence from standard Polish and most speakers also speak standard Polish, and dialectal features are strongly felt as distinct in the minds of speakers. This dialect remains open to external influence to this day.

== Phonology ==
Typical of Lesser Polish dialects (as well as Greater Polish dialects), voicing of word-final consonants before vowels and liquids is present here. Also typical of Lesser Polish dialects is the presence of mazuration, but only partially: cosnek, inacy. Penultimate stress occurs in Solonețu Nou, Pleșa, Nyzhni Petrivtsi and Terebleche, whereas initial accent occurs next to penultimate in Poiana Micului and Stara Huta possibly as the result of Slovak influence.

=== Vowels ===
The cluster ar raises to or or sometimes remains as ar: korczować; kark. Similarly, er raises to yr, ir: zbirał, pirszy. Ablaut of eT > oT is often missing: bierom, mietla. Vocalic r (e.g. of Czech or Slovak origin) is realized as ir, yr: kyrpcy, kyrdel.

==== Slanted vowels ====
Slanted á raises to o; Slanted é raises to i.

==== Nasal vowels ====
The cluster aN raises to uN: wiuneczek. Similarly, eN and ę (including before sonorants) raises to yN, iN: jedzynie, jelinia; gynski, rynka. Word final -ę denasalizes to -e: wode. oN and -ą also raise to uN: kunia; wziunć, funsy (standard wąsy). Word final -ą shifts to -um, -om: za sebom, kopiczkum.

=== Consonants ===
g often changes to h: hreczku; g, k, and ch soften before front vowels: giembe, kiepke, chiba; l stands in opposition to soft ĺ: stolek, lialki; ł is does not vocalize and remains either dental or dental alveolar probably under Slovak influence: łafce, łoszak; soft m sporadically changes to mń: mniasto, wymnie; soft rz remains: brzuch; z, s, and c may somewhat palatalize: zjeluna, Rosja, porcja; ś and ć are kept as archaisms in sierco, wesiele, cieść (standard teść); the cluster kt changes to cht next to kt: chto||kto, dochtor||doktor; epenthetic t occurs in srz: strzode, postrzodku; w is realized as either w or f in chw, tw: chwost||chfost, otwarty||otfarty; consonant clusters are simplified: pirszy; japka; metathesis occurs in the term porwuzek < powrózek. In Nyzhni Petrivtsi, Stara Huta, and Terebleche due to Russian and Ukrainian influence, -sk- and d, t can soften to -śk-, ď, and ť: rumuńśki, baťar.

== Inflection ==
=== Nouns ===
Some nouns show a difference in gender: kieszenia, raf; the masculine nominative plural may be formed with -e or -i/-y: chłopi/chłopy, kunie, rogi; the masculine genitive plural is formed with -ów, and in soft stems -i/-y can occur: chłopów, kuni/kuniów. In Nyzhni Petrivtsi, Stara Huta, and Terebleche due to Russian and Ukrainian influence, the dative feminine (as in the masculine) plural can be -am: mucham, babam, kuram.

=== Adjectives and adverbs ===
Adjectives in the masculine singular remain as -ij//-yj under Ukrainian influence: długij, paskudnyj. The comparative may be formed as in standard Polish with -szy, or with naj- attaching to the positive degree: najkrótki; also the Romanian particle maj can be used: maj głodny ("hungrier"); this same particle when used with the comparative forms the superlative: maj bogatszy ("the richest"). The instrumental plural of all genders for adjectives is formed with -emi: fajnemi.

=== Numerals ===
The numerals tri, sztyri decline according to Slovak declension: genitive troch, sztyroch; dative trom, sztyrom; accusative tri, sztyri; instrumental troma, sztyrmi, locative troch, sztyroch.

=== Verbs ===
The first person present tense singular is -m: pijem, bierem, gwarim, piszem, dojim, śpiewem.; the first person present tense singular is -me: ideme, bydeme, gwarime, jademe; the first person singular past tense is formed with the mobile particle jech: priszel jech, jo jech postompiła; the verb pójść shows an imperative from Slovak: poj, pojme, pojcie; the third person singular and plural future imperative is formed with niech, niechaj, naj.

== Vocabulary ==
=== Word-Formation ===
==== Nouns ====
Loanwords from Ukrainian and Romanian are adapted with -ko: nanaszko ("godfather"), tatko ("father"), buśko ("stork").; young animals and people are formed with -acko (<-aczko): dziwczacko, jagniacko; diminutives are frequently formed with -iczka: głowiczka; terms denoting female residents of a place are formed with -anka: hucianka; agent nouns are formed with -ar under Ukrainian and Slovak influence: bednar; handles of tools are formed with -isko: cepisko; natural phenomena are formed with -ica: fujawica.

==== Adjectives and adverbs ====
Diminutives of adjectives are formed with -ućki: drobniućki. Adverbs are commonly suffixed with -ka: dziśka, kiedysika.

== Syntax ==
Compound numerals are formed with i due to influence of Romanian şi: ot tricać i triuch, tricać i sztyriuch.

== See also ==
- Dialects of the Polish language
- Languages of Europe
- Polish language

== Bibliography ==
- Krasowska, Helena (2018). "Charakterystyka językowa polskiej gwary górali bukowińskich". Studia z Filologii Polskiej i Słowiańskiej (in Polish). Warsaw: Instytut Slawistyki Polskiej Akademii Nauk: 185-203.
