= Spisz dialect =

Dialect of Polish spoken in Poland

- Native to: Poland
- Region: Spisz
- Language family: Indo-European: Balto-Slavic; Slavic; West Slavic; Lechitic; Polish; Lesser Polish; Spisz dialect

Language codes
- ISO 639-3: –

The Spisz dialect (Polish: gwara spiska) belongs to the Lesser Poland dialect group and is located in the part of Poland. It is in part one of the dialects that belongs to the Goral ethnolect. It borders the Podhale dialect to the northwest.

The Spisz dialect is found partially in Poland (14 settlements) and partially in Slovakia (33 settlements). It is one of the dialects belonging to the Goral group. Often spiska was considered part of Podhale dialectally. Due to its geographic position, effects from neighboring dialects and Slovak can be seen in this dialect, causing ununiformity across the region. Many of the features here have varying levels of intensity depending on the given idiolect, but generally the usage of dialect here is strong and well preserved amongst older speakers.

This article is about the Spisz dialect found in Poland, not in Slovakia.

== Phonology ==
Typical of Lesser Polish dialects (as well as Greater Polish dialects), voicing of word-final consonants before vowels and liquids is present here. Also typical of Lesser Polish dialects is the presence of mazuration. Initial stress is present here.

=== Vowels ===
The so-called “Podhalanian archaism”, whereby after etymological cz, ż, sz (now c, z, s) as well as after etymological cy, zy, sy, i is retained, is present in eleven settlements.

==== Slanted vowels ====
Slanted vowels are both retained and merged: á is either separate or merged with o: teroz (teraz). Slanted é is either separate or has merged with y after both hard and soft consonants: mlyko (mleko). Slanted ó is separate or merges with u: gazdówka (may be gazdówka or gazduwka).

==== Nasal vowels ====
Nasal vowels are typically raised. Final -ą typically decomposes to -om, or sometimes -um.

==== Prothesis ====
Initial vowels rarely undergo prothesis here, likely as a result of Slovak influence, atypical of Goral and Lesser Polish dialects.

=== Consonants ===
Whereas in other Goral dialects final -ch becomes -k, here it becomes -f, and ch can become f in other positions as well: o tyf (o tych), przykufennych (przykuchennych). The cluster -kt- always gives -ft-: nifto (nikto). However, in the south-east of Spisz, the typical shift of ch > k is present, but not only finally: kałup (chałup), tyk małyk (tych małych). As a result of -ch > -f, a regional hypercorrection can be seen in the genitive plural ending -ów, which may be realized as -uk. This is because the final -w often devoices to -f, which was then confused with final -ch becoming -f. Many consonant clusters are simplified: trz > cz, and strz > szcz. Both dark ł and /w/ are present here, with /w/ becoming the more common realization. h can appear in place of g as a result of Slovak influence: hruby (gruby). r can appear in place of rz as a result of Slovak influence: wrucały (wrzucały). ki and gi can harden due to Slovak influence: słodke (słodkie). w can be voiced after t and k as a result of Slovak influence.

ch is often weakened or lost: ᶜʰłop (chłop), fᶜʰodzić, fodzić (wchodzić).

== Inflection ==
Traits common to Southern Poland, notably to other Goral dialects are also found here.

=== Nouns ===
The locative singular is often syncretic with the dative singular: w tym cłowiekowi (w tym człowieku). An archaic genitive singular -e is kept in feminine soft-stem nouns: z pościele (z pościeli). The locative plural may have -o- instead of -a- from Slovak influence: w rynkof (w rynkach).

=== Adjectives, adverbs, pronouns, and numerals ===
Superlatives are formed with both noj- and naj-. Many numerals are declined with -k: ośmiuk (ośmiu), śteruk (czterech).

=== Verbs ===
The first person present/future singular of verbs is -ym: idym (idę). The first person present/future plural of verbs is -ma/-me: piecyme (pieczymy). -me also appears in the first person imperative plural: podźme (pójdźmy). The first person past (aorist) -ch is retained here, realized as either -f or as -k in the west: przysłaf (przyszłam), zef ucyła (żech uczyła). The first person singular and third person plural present/future tense are often levelled: jo mozym – my mozemy – oni mozum (ja mogę, my możemy, oni mogą); level can also occur in the other direction as well: jo mogym – my mogymy – oni mogum.

== Vocabulary ==
=== Word-Formation ===
Many typical Lesser Polish word-formation tendencies are present here.

==== Verbs ====
The prefix roz- has lost initial r-: ozgrzoło (rozgrzało). -uwać appears here in place of -ować: buduwać (budować), brakuwało (brakuwało).

== Syntax ==
dwa may be used for feminine nouns instead of dwie due to Slovak influence. Often virile past tense forms are used with non-virile subjects: baby byli (baby były).

== See also ==
- Dialects of the Polish language
- Languages of Europe
