= Piwniczna dialect =

Dialect of Polish spoken in Poland

- Native to: Poland
- Region: Piwniczna-Zdrój
- Language family: Indo-European: Balto-Slavic; Slavic; West Slavic; Lechitic; Polish; Lesser Polish; Piwniczna dialect

Language codes
- ISO 639-3: –

The Piwniczna dialect belongs to the Lesser Poland dialect group and is located in the southern part of Poland. It is in part one of the dialects that belongs to the Goral ethnolect.

== Phonology ==
Typical of Lesser Polish dialects (as well as Greater Polish dialects), voicing of word-final consonants before vowels and liquids is present here. Also typical of Lesser Polish dialects is the presence of mazuration.

=== Vowels ===
-e- may be inserted between some consonant clusters. The group eł shifts to oł, and ił/ył shifts to uł both tautosyllabically and heterosyllabically. The Lechitic ablaut is often absent before hard dental consonants.

==== Slanted vowels ====
Slanted á raises to o. Slanted é raises to y after both hard and soft consonants. Slanted ó is retained as ó.

==== Nasal vowels ====
Medial -ę- decomposes to yN before non-sibilant consonants, and medial -ą- to oN. Before sibilants, nasality is retained for both. Final -ę denasalizes to -e, and final -ą can be nasal -ǫ or -o in the third person plural present tense of verbs, -o in the accusative feminine singular of adjectives, numerals, and pronouns, and -om in the instrumental feminine singular of adjectives, numerals, and pronouns.

==== Prothesis ====
Initial o- usually labializes to ô-. Initial a- may sporadically gain a prothetic h- or j-.

=== Consonants ===
Final -ch shifts to either -f or -ch, with a preference for -f, in both stems as well as inflections. It shifts to k in many clusters in certain words: krzest (chrzest). Infintives ending in -ść, -źć are usually simplified to -ś, -ź. sz is often realized as ś in loanwords, a process unrelated to masuration. ł is often lost after a consonant. pół and pół- (as a prefix) are reduced to pu(-). trz, strz, drz usually simplify to cz, szcz, dż. źr is present instead of jrz. s may geminate in certain words.

== Inflection ==
Typical Goral inflectional tendencies are present here.

=== Nouns ===
Nouns may show a lack of mobile e: mech||mechu. -a is preferred for the masculine genitive singular over -u. The archaic -e of feminine genitive singular of soft stems is preserved.

=== Adjectives and adverbs ===
The masculine/neuter instrumental singular is formed with -em instead of -ym.

=== Verbs ===
The imperative is formed with -ej instead of -aj. The first person plural present/future as well as imperative is formed with -ma instead of -my.

== Vocabulary ==
=== Word-Formation ===
Typical word-formation tendencies of southern Poland can be found here.

==== Nouns ====
The noun-forming suffix -ata is present here, albeit rare: odziata (odzienie).

==== Adjectives ====
Possessive adjectives may be formed with -in.

==== Verbs ====
Iteratives are often formed with -uwać instead of -ywać/-iwać.

== Syntax ==
Plural forms may be used as a form of respect.

== See also ==
- Dialects of the Polish language
- Languages of Europe
- Polish language
