= Łącko dialect =

Dialect of Polish spoken in Poland

- Native to: Poland
- Region: Łącko
- Language family: Indo-European: Balto-Slavic; Slavic; West Slavic; Lechitic; Polish; Lesser Polish; Łącko dialect

Language codes
- ISO 639-3: –

The Łącko dialect belongs to the Lesser Poland dialect group and is located in the southern part of Poland. It is in part one of the dialects that belongs to the Goral ethnolect.

== Phonology ==
Typical of Lesser Polish dialects (as well as Greater Polish dialects), voicing of word-final consonants before vowels and liquids is present here. Also typical of Lesser Polish dialects is the presence of mazuration. Initial accent is present here.

=== Vowels ===
The group eł shifts to oł, and ił/ył shifts to uł both tautosyllabically and heterosyllabically.

==== Slanted vowels ====
Slanted á is retained as á or raises to o. Slanted é raises to y after both hard and soft consonants. Slanted ó is retained as ó.

==== Nasal vowels ====
The nasal vowels in the Łącko dialect approached one another in realization, but never fully merged. ę both medially and finally shifts to -o, and ą to ó, except instrumental feminine singular of nouns, where it is -om. The groups eN and aN both shift to oN.

==== Prothesis ====
Initial o- usually labializes to ô-. Initial a- may gain a prothetic h- or j- in some words.

=== Consonants ===
Final -ch shifts to -k in the inflections of nouns and adjectives and pronouns. ń at the end of a syllable shifts to j.

== Inflection ==
Typical Goral inflectional tendencies are present here.

=== Nouns ===
The archaic -e of feminine genitive singular of soft stems is preserved.

=== Verbs ===
The first person plural present tense of verbs is formed with -ma instead of -my.

=== Prepositions and prefixes ===
The prefix roz- is usually realized as ôz-.

== Vocabulary ==
=== Word-Formation ===
Typical word-formation tendencies of southern Poland can be found here.

==== Verbs ====
Iteratives are often formed with -uwać instead of -ywać/-iwać.

== Syntax ==
Masculine personal nouns and masculine animal nouns are often levelled.

== See also ==
- Dialects of the Polish language
- Languages of Europe
- Polish language
