= Goral ethnolect =

West Slavic ethnolect

Goral
- Highlander Polish, Highland Polish
- górolsko gwara góralsko gwara
- Pronunciation: Slavic pronunciation: [ˈɡorɔlskɔ ˈɡvara]
- Native to: Poland (Lesser Poland Voivodeship, Silesian Voivodeship); Slovakia (Žilina Region, Prešov Region); Czech Republic (Moravian-Silesian Region) Hungary, Ukraine, Romania
- Region: Goral Lands
- Ethnicity: Gorals
- Native speakers: 50,307 in Slovakia (2023 study)
- Language family: Indo-European: Balto-Slavic; Slavic; West Slavic; Lechitic; Polish; Lesser Polish; Goral
- Dialects: Babia Góra; Kliszczak; Pieniny; Łącko; Piwniczna; Żywiec; Orawa; Podhale; Spisz; Gorce; Kysuce; Ochotnica; Liptov
- Writing system: Latin script

Official status
- Recognised minority language in: Slovakia

Language codes
- ISO 639-3: –

Goral, less frequently called Highlander or Highland Polish, is an ethnolect of the Lechitic group, more specifically of the Lesser Poland dialect group spoken by the Gorals. Its vocabulary was significantly influenced by many languages like Slovak, Rusyn, Hungarian, Romanian and German, being common vocabulary of the Carpathian region. Some consider Goral to be a microlanguage, alongside Silesian and to a lesser extent Masurian.

The term Goral derives from the Slavic word for mountain (góra, hora) and the noun-forming suffix denoting people -al.

The Goral ethnolect is often equated to the Podhale dialect; however, this is only one of the many Goral dialects and the term itself is from a linguistic perspective imprecise. The term itself refers not to one dialect but to several unique dialects with similar vocabulary (mostly related to pastoralism) or common isoglosses like the aoristic -k.

== Transcription ==
Goral orthography is fairly unstandardized and may vary significantly dialect-to-dialect, most notably in the writing of the slanted vowels.

Letters
Majuscule forms (also called uppercase or capital letters)
A	Á	B	C	Ć	D	E	É	F	G	H	I	J	K	L	Ł	M	N	Ń	O	Ó	P	R	S	Ś	T	U	W	Y	Ý	Z	Ź	Ż
Minuscule forms (also called lowercase or small letters)
a	á	b	c	ć	d	e	é	f	g	h	i	j	k	l	ł	m	n	ń	o	ó	p	r	s	ś	t	u	w	y	ý	z	ź	ż
Phonetic realizations in IPA
a	ɒ	b	t͡s	t͡ɕ	d	ɛ	e	f	g	x~ɦ	i	j	k	l	w	m	n	ɲ	ɔ	o	p	r	s	ɕ	t	u	v	ɨ	i (Note: used after sibilants to show a lack of palatalization)	z	ʑ	ʐ

Digraphs
Majuscule forms (also called uppercase or capital letters)
AU	CH	CZ	DZ	DŹ	DŻ	EU	RZ	SZ
Minuscule forms (also called lowercase or small letters)
au	ch	cz	dz	dź	dż	eu	rz	sz
Phonetic realizations in IPA
au	x	t͡ʂ	d͡z	d͡ʑ	d͡ʐ	eu	r̝~ʐ~ʂ	ʂ

== Phonology ==
There is a tendency to reduce the number of phonemes in the phonological system of Goral, usually by raised the historic slanted vowels, by merging certain consonants, and by simplifying many consonant clusters.

=== Vowels ===
A few vowel systems may occur throughout Goral, with one being the most dominant.

Goral vowels
	Front	Central	Back
Close	i	ɨ (Note: Preserved in most dialects, but may merge in Liptov, Pohorelá, Horelica na Kysuciach, and the Stará Ľubovňa District, where it approaches phonetically [ɪ])	u
Close-mid	(e) (Note: Preserved in Pohorelá, otherwise merges with y or i)		o (Note: Preserved in most dialects, but merges with /ɔ/ in Liptov, Horelica na Kysuciach, and the Stará Ľubovňa District, with /u/ in Babia Góra or replaces Polish nasals in the Pogórze Goral dialects)
Open-mid	ɛ		ɔ
Open		a	(ɒ) (Note: Now rare, generally merged with /ɔ/)

=== Consonants ===
Goral consonants
		Labial	Dental/ Alveolar	Retroflex	(Alveolo-) palatal	Velar
Nasal		m	n		ɲ	
Plosive	voiceless	p	t			k
Plosive	voiced	b	d			ɡ
Affricate	voiceless		t͡s	t͡ʂ (Note: Typically merged with /t͡s d͡z s z/ due Masuration, or is the result from a loss of /r̝/)	t͡ɕ (Note: May be hardened towards [t͡ʃ d͡ʒ ʃ ʒ] due to Slovak influence)	
Affricate	voiced		d͡z	d͡ʐ	d͡ʑ	
Fricative	voiceless	f	s	ʂ	ɕ	x
Fricative	voiced	v	z	ʐ	ʑ	
Trill			r		r̝ (Note: often becomes /ʂ/ (after voiceless consonants) or /ʐ/ (after voiced consonants) in many dialects)	
Approximant		(w)	l		j	w

== Grammar ==
There is a strong tendency to level the multiple inherited declension patterns in Goral.

The first person present/future singular of verbs is most commonly formed across the whole region with -m as a result of Slovak influence: bedem/bedym, idem/idym (Standard Polish będę, idę). These forms can also be reinforced via levelling of paradigms such as móc > mozym, however, this is not a uniform process, and forms such as mogymy without the g||z alternation are also present. Forms such as bede in some regions, but often -m is preferred by the younger generation. Most dialects form the first person present/future plural of verbs with -me, also the result of Slovak influence.

Many dialects, namely Kysuce, Spisz, and parts of Orawa, level both mobile-e declensions as well as ablaut: zymb > zymba (Standard Polish ząb > zęba); lyn > lynu (Standard Polish len > lnu).

The comparative is generally formed with -sy instead of -ejszy.

The complex gender system of Polish distinguishing masculine personal, masculine animal, and masculine inanimate nouns is also levelled, whereby the plurals of masculine personal nouns are replaced with the plurals of masculine animal nouns, but the masculine virile plural forms of past tense verbs replace non-virile forms: hlopi robili, baby robili. Similarly, the feminine form of dwie is replaced with dwa: dwa baby. A similar process of levelling occurs in eastern Slovak dialects, as well as most Polish dialects.

In southern Spiš, many feminine nouns ending in -w are extended with mobile e: kerwi (Standard Polish krwi).

== History and culture ==
Goral has a rich literary tradition reaching back to the 19th century with notable authors such as Władysław Orkan, Andrzej Stopka Nazimek or Kazimierz Przerwa Tetmajer. Other sites exist, such as hawok.pl, a news site written in Goral and about Goral affairs.

The history of Goral stretches back to the XIII century. The area was initially fully part of Vistulia and later Poland in the Middle Ages but was at the time very sparsely populated, with the possible exceptions of the Dunajec and Poprad valleys where the locals spoke a Lechitic dialect related to the Muszyna dialect and similar to Eastern Slovak explaining the many similarities in lexicon and partially phonology. This promoted settlement from the 13th to 17th century by Lesser Polish peasants, Germans and notably for the region migrating Vlachs (Rusyns and Slovaks) motivated by the lack of serfdom (similarly to Ukraine). The mix of these languages and a unique history compared to the rest of Poland gave rise to Goral.

== Assimilation with Slovak ==
Northern Slovak dialects have deeply influenced Slovak Goral dialects, but the direction of influence is one-way, as Goral has not affected Slovak dialects. This effect has become stronger in recent years, with many Slovak Goral dialects borrowing even more from Slovak. Soft labials and soft velars depalatalize in some villages in Slovakia due to Slovak influence: ciebe, slodke (ciebie, slodkie).

== Common features ==
Many features indicate a Lechitic origin for Goral:

1. As in Polish and Polish dialects, Proto-Slavic *TorT, TolT developed into TroT, TloT (as opposed to Slovak TraT, TlaT): broda, głowa. This feature is one of the defining sound changes evincing the Lechitic origin of Goral, and not Slovak. A few Slovak forms are present via borrowing.
2. Also as in Polish, an ablaut of the Proto-Slavic front vowels *ě, e, ę 'a ʼo ʼǫ and depalitalisation of the syllabic sonorants *r̥', ľ̥ to r̥, l̥ before t, d, n, r, ł, (l), s, z: wiara, wierzýć.
3. Many vowel alternations are levelled due to morphological analogy as well as Polish-Slovak influence: niese, niesym; niesies; niesie (Standard Polish niosę; niesiesz; niesie and Slovak nesiem; nesieš; nesie).
4. A raising of old slanted é to y, even after soft consonants: chlyb. However, slanted é may rarely be heard regionally. Slanted ó is still present, but may sporadically with o on occasion due to Slovak influence. Slanted á has generally merged with o, but can rarely be heard regionally. o resulting from old slanted á does not undergo labialization. Due to Slovak influence, this o may also be replaced by a, especially in morphological endings due to analogy.
5. Frequent labialization of o to ô: ôkno.
6. A decomposition or denasalisation of nasal vowels. Decomposition usually occurs when a nasal is before a consonant. Word-final -ę denasalises, and word-final -ą decomposes to -om. Regionally, total denasalisation in all positions occurs. The resulting denasalised vowel can have either a more Polish or Slovak realisation depending on the region.
7. As in other Lesser Poland dialects, masuration is present, except in a few dialects. Jabłonkowanie and even hardening ś ź ć to s z c is also present in some dialects.
8. The alternation of g||ch, common in Polish, is only marginally present here, and often ch weakens to h, as does g. Final -ch usually strengthens to -k or regionally -f, especially in morphological endings. This change happens less frequently in stems, and some dialects restore original -ch due to Slovak influence. As a result of Slovak influence, the phoneme h may contrast with ch in some dialects.
9. A fricative pronunciation of rz as /r̝/ can be heard regionally here. Elsewhere, it either merges with ż, sz, as in Polish (but notably does not undergo masuration), or hardens to r as in Slovak.
10. The preservation of the so-called Podhale archaism: after etymological cz, ż, sz (now c, z, s) as well as after etymological cy, zy, sy, i is retained, which is the original pronunciation, and i is also preserved after rz.
11. The preservation of the first person aorist as -k/-f.
12. A common vocabulary different from other Lesser Polish dialects.
13. Initial accent.

== Example ==
Goral (Note: In most dialects, é is as y or e word-finally and á is often written as o. Labialization of ô is often not written as well.)

Ôjce nas, côś jes w niebié;
niek sié świynci imié Twôjé;
Niek przýdzié Twôjé królôwanié;
Niek sié spełniyło Twôja wólo na ziymi, tak jakô i w niebié;
Chlyba nasegô posedniygô dej nom dzisiok;
I ôdpuść nom nase przewiny,
tak jakô my darujemy tym, cô nom przewiniyli;
I nié dej, côby my sié dali pôkusie,
ba nos uchowoj ôde złegô
Jamyn.

Polish

Ojcze nasz, któryś jest w niebie,
święć się imię Twoje,
przyjdź królestwo Twoje,
bądź wola Twoja
jako w niebie tak i na ziemi.
Chleba naszego powszedniego daj nam dzisiaj.
I odpuść nam nasze winy,
jako i my odpuszczamy naszym winowajcom.
I nie wódź nas na pokuszenie,
ale nas zbaw od złego.
Amen.

Slovak

Otče náš, ktorý si na nebesiach,
posväť sa meno tvoje,
príď kráľovstvo tvoje,
buď vôľa tvoja ako v nebi, tak i na zemi.
Chlieb náš každodenný daj nám dnes
a odpusť nám naše viny,
ako aj my odpúšťame svojim vinníkom,
a neuveď nás do pokušenia,
ale zbav nás zlého. Amen.

English

Our Father who art in heaven,
hallowed be thy name.
Thy kingdom come,
thy will be done,
on earth, as it is in heaven.
Give us this day our daily bread,
and forgive us our trespasses,
as we forgive those who trespass against us.
And lead us not into temptation,
but deliver us from evil.
Amen.

== Dialects ==
Dialects of Goral include:

- Carpathian-Podgórze Goral dialects

- Babia Góra dialect
- Kliszczak dialect
- Pieniny dialect
- Łącko dialect
- Piwniczna dialect

- Żywiec dialect
- Orawa dialect
- Podhale dialect
- Spisz dialect
- Zagórze dialect
- Kysuce dialect
- Ochotnica dialect
- Liptov dialect (not to be confused with the Slovak Liptov dialect)
- Bukovinian dialect

The dialects spoken by Silesian Gorals are considered closer Silesian but are referred to as Goral by Silesian Gorals in Poland, due to them feeling more Goral than Silesian. Silesian Gorals in Trans-Olza usually consider themselves more Silesian and are more likely to call it Silesian. The Łącko and northern Piwniczna dialects have been under very heavy Lach influence, with some even claiming that there are only a few traits of Goral left in the dialects.

== Bibliography ==
- Dudášová-Kriššáková, Júlia (2016). Goralské nárečia z pohľadu súčasnej slovenskej jazykovedy (PDF) (in Slovak). Preszów: Vydavateľstvo Prešovskej univerzity v Prešove. ISBN 978-80-555-1714-8.
- Makowska, Justyna (2012). "Gwara podhalańska jako tworzywo literackie: próba charakterystyki na przykładzie twórczości Jana Gutta-Mostowego i Anieli Gut-Stapińskiej" (PDF). Językoznawstwo: Współczesne badania, problemy i analizy językoznawcze (in Polish). Muzeum Historii Polski.
