= Lesser Poland dialect group =

Dialect of the Polish language

- dialekt małopolski
- Native to: Poland
- Region: Lesser Poland Voivodeship; Subcarpathian Voivodeship; Holy Cross Voivodeship; Lublin Voivodeship; Łódź Voivodeship; Silesian Voivodeship; Masovian Voivodeship
- Ethnicity: Lesser Poland people
- Language family: Indo-European: Balto-Slavic; Slavic; West Slavic; Lechitic; Polish; Lesser Poland dialect group
- Dialects: Goral
- Writing system: Latin (Polish alphabet)

Language codes
- ISO 639-3: –
- Glottolog: None
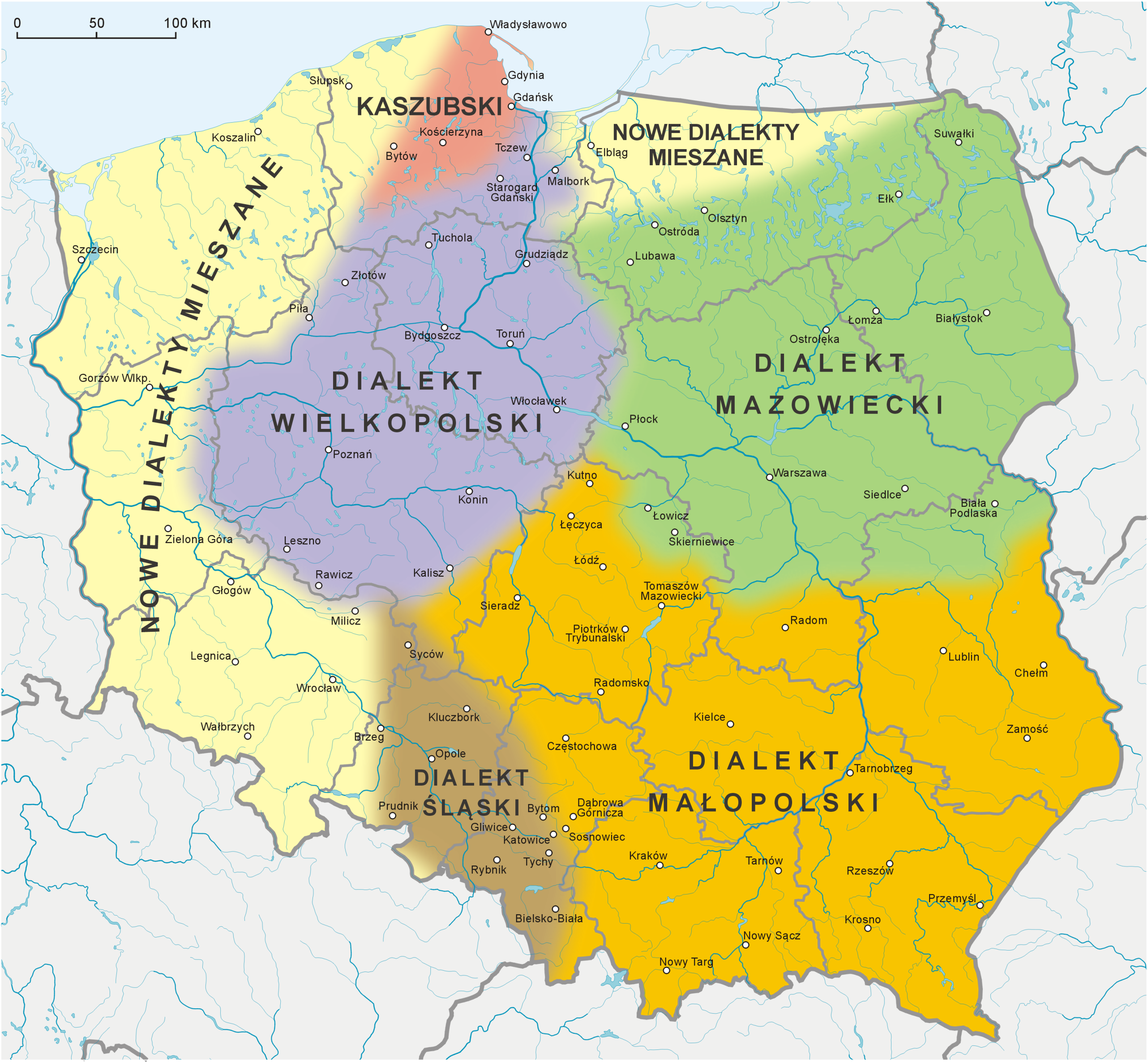
- Map of the dialects of Polish, including the Lesser Poland dialect marked in yellow.

The Lesser Polish dialect group (Polish: dialekt małopolski) is a dialect group of the Polish language used in Lesser Poland. The exact area is difficult to delineate due to the expansion of its features and the existence of transitional subdialects.

The common traits of the Lesser Polish dialect include:

- mazurzenie
- regressive voicing of obstruents, including across word boundaries; e.g.: kot leci [kɔd ˈlɛt͡ɕi] (standard Polish: [kɔt ˈlɛt͡ɕi])
- differentiated nasalisation (or lack thereof) of /ɔ̃/ and /ɛ̃/ in different parts of the area
- merger of stop+fricative consonant clusters into affricates; e.g.: trzysta [ˈt͡ʂɨsta] (standard Polish: [ˈtʂɨsta] or [ˈt͡ʂʂɨsta])
- frequent usage of initial syllable stress, also oxytonic stress in vocative case (as opposed to paroxytonic stress common in other varieties of Polish)
- frequent usage of grammatical particle "że" in imperative mood ("weźże" vs. "weź" – take)

== List of dialects ==
Descended from the language of the Vistulans, is the most numerous dialectal group in modern Poland. the dialects are:

- Łęczyca dialect
- Sieradz dialect
- Masovian Borderland dialect
- Kielce dialect
- Kraków dialect
- Lasovia dialect
- Eastern Kraków dialect
- Carpathian-Podgórze Lach dialects

- Podegrodzie dialect
- Limanowa dialect

- Western Lublin dialect
- Eastern Lublin dialect
- Przemyśl dialect
- Lwów dialect
- Biecz dialect

The Goral ethnolect (the name for the many dialects spoken by Gorals in Western Carpathians bordering Poland and Slovakia), which include:

- Carpathian-Podgórze Goral dialects

- Babia Góra dialect
- Kliszczak dialect
- Pieniny dialect
- Łącko dialect
- Piwniczna

- Żywiec dialect
- Orawa dialect
- Podhale dialect
- Spisz dialect
- Zagórze dialect
- Kysuce dialect
- Ochotnica dialect
- Liptov dialect (not to be confused with the Slovakian Liptov dialect)
- Bukovinian dialect

== Features of the region ==
Features that can be found in various intensities and distributions in the region include:

1. *telt > tlet
2. *tórt’ > trot
3. *ľ̥ > l̥ except *Pľ̥T́PK (after labials, before palatals/labials, and velars)
4. *Pľ̥T́PK > PilT́PK: wilk, milczeć or > łu after dentals: słup, długi, or oł after cz, ż, sz: mołwa, czółno, żółty, or eł after labials: chełm, chełpić się, wełna, pełny
5. *ŕ̥T > ‘ar: twardy, tarł, ziarno
6. voicing of coda stops and sibilants if the next word begins with a vowel or liquid
7. bilabial w > v, which can be f, f́ after voiceless consonant, tfůj, kf́at. This also affect f < chw
8. Mazuration
9. ḷ > ł > u̯
10. depalatalization of word final palatal labials
11. phonemization of ḱ, ǵ from retaining them when they occursed before *y, ъ̥, e as well as denasalization of ę (kę/gę > ke/ge)
12. -ch > -k, or in Spisz > -f (only word finally), or in clusters: kfała, kćáł
13. Tendency for assimilation and simplification:
  1. velarization of n before k (phonemic?)
  2. -ść, -śń > -ś: zleś, gryź, pleś, maś (maść)
  3. weakening loss of -ł- at the end of an inlaut (śródgłos): gᵘ̭ova
  4. strz, zdrz, trz, drz > szcz, żdż, cz, dż
  5. rs, r-z > rz
  6. kk > k
14. Doubling of s, ś in bᵘ̯ossᵘ̯o, leśśe, viśśi, viessá, and sometimes ss śś > sc, ść bᵘ̯osco v leśće, viscá
15. Breaking of the groups ss, zz, źź, vv, v́v́, ff, f́f́ by placing a mobile e after the prepositions/prefixes z(-), v(-)
16. śrz, źrz > śr, źr or in the north > rś, rź
17. placement of stress on the penultimate syllable except in Podhale, which has initial stress
18. loss of intervocalic j and contraction
19. preference for jasne o: skolny (szkolny)
20. ir > er in serce, śmierć, piersi, otherwise > ér
21. In the north yl, ył, il, ił > el, eł, beł, beli, uN > oN, font, gront, lack of eN, oN > éN, óN
22. i > y after sz, ż, cz, dż, c, dz, rz (including Mazurized pronunciations of sibilants) except in Podhale, which still has i
23. Fronting, flattening, and narrowing of á before tautosyllabic j in the imperative: cekej (except in most subialects, which have -aj?, except dać?)
24. á > o tako trova
25. é > y after hard and soft consonants, except in the north where > y after hard, > i after soft, and in one region (34D in Dejna) > e at least after hard
26. Traces of e > o before tautosyllabic u̯ (ł), can be found in some Standard Polish words (kocioł, kozioł, osioł)
27. diphthongization/labialization of o > ᵘ̯o (not just initially)
28. sometimes fronting of ᵘ̯o > ᵘ̯oᵉ, u̯ë, ᵘ̯ë, which avoids raising of o, which could be confused with the reflex of pochylone ó
29. Loss of the alternation caused by ablaut of ‘o||’e, miotła||mietle by analogy of nonablauted forms, wiesna (via wieśnie), niesę (via nieśli), also influenced by the change above
30. Old Polish ą̆ (in a short syllable) > e ide, wode, along with denasalization of the vowel into an assimilated nasal consonant before a consonant, and total loss before stops and sibilants: deby (dęby) gesi (gęsi). Regionally ą̆ is retained, or mergs with ǫ: zǫp zǫby
31. Old Polish ą̄ (in a long syllable) > ą̊ (and most commonly) > ǫ along with denasalization of the vowel: dåb, dop (dąb), or sometimes in final position -om
32. -iszcze > -isko
33. Spread of -asty, -isty
34. -‘ev- > -‘ov-, also after soft consonants
35. use of od(-) before vowels and semivowels (as opposed to ot(-))
36. loss of r- in the prefix roz-: ᵘ̯ozlác
37. replacement of locative plural -’ech > -’och by analogy of -‘evi > -‘ovi etc., which was later replaced by -ach
38. Levelling of the nominative and accusative singular neuter endings -ē and -ĕ by spreading -e, pole
39. Replacement of the genitive singular masculine/neuter adjective endings -égo with -ego via tego, do niego
40. Tendency to replace some noun declension endings with adjective endings or vice-versa
41. Replacement of the neuter nominative/accusative numeral dwie with the masculine dwa
42. Prefixed iść type verbs with an inserted -ń-
43. Hardening of the first person singular and plural verb endings such as idemy, złapę by analogy of idę and archaic grzebę
44. Spread of hard labial in l-forms of melę/pelę via contamination of ḿel-, ṕel, and the l-forms mełł-, pełl-
45. spread of the first person plural verb ending -my (over -m) under influence of the pronoun my, or with -va, sometimes -ma via contamination of the two; in the souther -me via Slovak.
46. Creation and spread of the preterite ending -ek (or -k after a vowel) < -ech, contaminated with -(ś)ḿ as well as with the aorist form of the auxiliary verb bych in the south-wst: nosiłek, byłak; elsewhere -em (-m after a vowel), which can voice the stem: zaniuzem, zanius. This form could be a reduction of -chm(y)
47. Creation of the first person plural preteriate ending -chmy via contamination -(je)sm + (by)chom and under the influence of the pronoun my: nieślichmy. In some Lesser Poland subdialects, -sm > -śḿ under influence of -ś, -ście
48. Rise of masculine personal nouns, except in a large number of subdialects where the gender disappeared.
