= Pieniny dialect =

Dialect of Polish spoken in Poland

- Native to: Poland
- Region: Pieniny
- Language family: Indo-European: Balto-Slavic; Slavic; West Slavic; Lechitic; Polish; Lesser Polish; Pieniny dialect

Language codes
- ISO 639-3: –

The Pieniny dialect belongs to the Lesser Poland dialect group and is located in the part of Poland. It is in part one of the dialects that belongs to the Goral ethnolect.

== Phonology ==
Typical of Lesser Polish dialects (as well as Greater Polish dialects), voicing of word-final consonants before vowels and liquids is present here. Also typical of Lesser Polish dialects is the presence of mazuration. Initial accent is present here.

=== Vowels ===
The Lechitic ablaut is often absent before hard dental consonants. -e- may be inserted between some consonant clusters. The so-called “Podhalanian archaism” is absent here.

==== Slanted vowels ====
Slanted á is retained as á or more frequently raises to o. Slanted é raises to y after both hard and soft consonants. Slanted ó is retained as ó.

==== Nasal vowels ====
Nasal vowels show much variety between generations and location. Most commonly today, medial ę become oN, medial ą becomes óN, except when they are before a sibilant, in which case they shift to u with no nasal consonant. Final ę and -em becomes o, and final ą becomes ó, including in inflectional endings. Other instances of eN, yN, and aN often shift to oN.

==== Prothesis ====
Initial o- usually labializes to ô-. Initial a- may sporadically gain a prothetic h- or j-.

=== Consonants ===
As in the Spisz dialect, final -ch shifts to -f in inflectional endings and some grammatical particles. ch may also shift to k in many cluster: kwila (chwila), and the cluster kt- shifts to ft-: fto (kto). Infintives ending in -ść, -źć are usually simplified to -ś, -ź. s may geminate in certain words: do lassa (do lasu).

== Inflection ==
Typical Goral inflectional tendencies are present here.

=== Nouns ===
The masculine/neuter instrumental singular ending -em shifts to -o. The archaic -e of feminine genitive singular of soft stems is preserved. -owi is used for the dative for all masculine nouns and also in the masculine locative singular. -a is preferred for the masculine genitive singular over -u.

=== Adjectives and adverbs ===
-ej often changes to -y in adjectival-pronominal inflections.

=== Prepositions and prefixes ===
The prefix roz- is usually realized as ôz-.

== Vocabulary ==
=== Word-Formation ===
Typical word-formation tendencies of southern Poland can be found here.

==== Verbs ====
Iteratives are often formed with -uwać instead of -ywać/-iwać.

== Syntax ==
Masculine personal nouns and masculine animal nouns are often levelled. Plural forms may be used as a form of respect.

== See also ==
- Dialects of the Polish language
- Languages of Europe
- Polish language
