= Kielce dialect =

Dialect of Polish spoken in Poland

- Native to: Poland
- Region: Kielce
- Language family: Indo-European: Balto-Slavic; Slavic; West Slavic; Lechitic; Polish; Lesser Polish; Kielce dialect

Language codes
- ISO 639-3: –

The Kielce dialect (Polish: gwara kielecka) belongs to the Lesser Poland dialect group and is spoken in the Świętokrzyskie region of southern Poland. It borders the Masovian Borderland dialect to the north, the Western Lublin dialect to the northeast, the Lasovia dialect to the southeast, the Eastern Krakow dialect to the south, the Krakow dialect to the southwest, the Sieradz dialect to the west, and the Łęczyca dialect to the northwest.

== Phonology ==
Typical of Lesser Polish dialects (as well as Greater Polish dialects), voicing of word-final consonants before vowels and liquids is present here. Also typical of Lesser Polish dialects is the presence of mazuration, which is more common with older speakers and rather uncommon among younger speakers.

=== Vowels ===
The cluster -eł- can sometimes shift to -oł-, but -eł- is more common. o can raise to ó in certain pronouns: cóś (coś) before liquids, and in many imperative forms: chódź (chodź). Liquids can also raise -a- to -o-, or rarely -e- (before r). Tautosyllabic -aj in adverbs and imperatives often shifts to -ej or -oj. u can lower to o before liquids. i and y can often lower to e before liquids or rarely before other consonants as well. The shift of initial ra-/re- is also limited to specific words.

==== Slanted vowels ====
Slanted á raises to o. Slanted é typically lowers to e, can raise to i after soft consonants, and to y after hard consonants, but lowering the most common realization. Slanted ó is raised to u.

==== Nasal vowels ====
Nasal vowels can decompose medially to eN or oN (sometimes before sibilants as well) and lose nasality before l, ł, denasalize word-finally to -e, -o (or -ą can decompose to -om), denasalize everywhere: sceście (szczęście). -ę- can shift to -iń- before two soft consonants. Some words show fluctuation: pawąz/pawęz. Secondary nasalization is also sporadically found. e can also raise to i/y before nasals.

==== Prothesis ====
o can labialize initially or after labials/velars to ô-, and can further shift to e. Initial u can also labialize to û-.

=== Consonants ===
Occasionally final -ch can shift to -k here. Historically śrz-, źrz- change to rś-, rź-, but śr- and źr- are more common. Other instances of consonantal prothesis before word-initial vowels occur, but are rare. ł can sometimes be lost when at the end of a consonant cluster or intervocalically. -ść, -źć shifts to just -ś, -ź. n before a velar assimaltes and realized as [ŋ]. ch- in a consonant cluster can shift to k-, and kt- shifts to cht-. strz, trz, zdrz, drz, st, stn simplify to szcz(sz), cz(sz), żdż(ż), dż(ż), s, sn, sf. rst, rsk, rszt, rz, rż, rść tend to simplify in various ways, usually with the loss of r. A change of s, ś to ss, śś, sc, ść occurs in many words. Many other consonant clusters simplify as well.

== Inflection ==
Typical features of Lesser Polish inflection are common here.

=== Nouns ===
Many noun forms do not show ablaut, the result of levelling: mietła (miotła). Often mobile -e- is kept in inflections and added in some clusters: z bezu, mechu (z bzu, mchu); łoter (łotr). -a is preferred as the masculine genitive ending, especially in loanwords, and -u can sometimes be found where in Standard Polish would be -a.Softening -e can be found in place of -u for the masculine locative of soft stem nouns: w kapelusie (w kapeluszu), but also fluctuation between -e and -u for the locative/vocative of some masculine nouns: na dworzu//na dworze. Neuter nouns ending in -um can sometimes take -a in the genitive: do liceuma (do liceum). Many feminine nouns ending in a consonant instead end in -a here: krokwa (krokiew), or sometimes the opposite: potrzeb (potrzeba). The feminine accusative plural ending in a soft consonant has fluctuation: zapowiedzie//zapowiedzi. -ów can on occasion be used as the genitive plural ending for all nouns regardless of gender. Many nouns differ in gender from Standard Polish. The genitive as accusative singular is often used for masculine objects regardless of animacy: wypuścił dwóch psów, znaloz grzyba, or masculine personal nouns may be converted to masculine animal nouns: sąsiady; Robotniki boły sie wyńś (robotnicy bali się wejść).

=== Adjectives, adverbs, pronouns, and numerals ===
The adverb comparative and genitive/dative feminine singular ending of pronouns and adjectives -ej shifts to -i/-y. Numerals often have archaic inflections.

=== Verbs ===
The imperative may be formed with either -ej or -oj due to sound changes. Many verb forms do not show ablaut, the result of levelling: wieze (wiozę). Many first person present/future verb forms have hardened consonants via analogy: złape (złapię). -ta and -wa can sometimes be found in imperatives, where -wa has an archaic marking. Many verbs take different government than in Standard Polish. The contemporary adverbial participle is built with the archaic -ący, where in Standard Polish it is -ąc. Prefixed forms of -iść usually have -ń- instead of -j-: dońde (dojdę). Initial s-, ś- is partially retained here: słożyć (złożyć).

== Vocabulary ==
=== Word-Formation ===
Typical Lesser Polish word-formation is common here.

==== Adjectives, adverbs, pronouns, and numerals ====
-iwny instead of -iwy can be found in many words, along with -ny instead of -owy for some relational adjectives, and -ny instead of -asty in some cases. A final -k and -j is added to many pronouns and adverbs: nikogój (nikogo), jeszczek (jeszcze).

==== Verbs ====
-uwać is used for frequentative verbs here, and often -ić/-yć replaces -eć. Many verbal prefixes are preferred over standard verbs: ośmiać się (roześmiać się). The prefix roz- lost initial r- and labaliazed the following o.

== Syntax ==
The plural is sometimes used as a formal way to address someone: mama to jedli. Frequently bez and przez are conflated. An archaic style of prepositional phrases can be seen here: po podłącu.

== See also ==
- Dialects of the Polish language
- Languages of Europe
- Polish language
