= Kraków dialect =

Dialect of Polish spoken in Poland

- Native to: Poland
- Region: Former villages now part of Kraków, Central Lesser Poland
- Language family: Indo-European: Balto-Slavic; Slavic; West Slavic; Lechitic; Polish; Lesser Polish; Kraków dialect

Language codes
- ISO 639-3: –

The Kraków dialect (Polish: gwara krakowska) belongs to the Lesser Poland dialect group and is located in the part of Poland. It borders the Sieradz dialect to the north, the Kielce dialect to the northeast, the Eastern Kraków dialect to the east, the Podegrodzie dialect to the south, and Silesian to the west. Scholars often debate about the northern and western borders of this dialect. This dialect is slowly losing many features and replacing them with those from Standard Polish.

== Phonology ==
Both voicing and devoicing of word-final consonants before vowels and liquids is present here, with devoicing being common in the north from Masovian influence. Also typical of Lesser Polish dialects is the presence of mazuration, but is slowly being lost.

=== Vowels ===
Typical Lesser Polish vowel development is found here.

==== Slanted vowels ====
Slanted á is realized either as á or is raised to o. Slanted é is raised to y, or more rarely, i. This also effects the adverb comparative ending/genitive/dative/locative singular feminine ending for adjectives -ej > -yj/-ij. e can raise to y before r. ó can be realized as ó or raised to u.

==== Nasal vowels ====
ą is typically a nasal ǫ or ǫ́, and ę is typically a nasal ę, y̨, or ę́, and decompose to oN, eN before non-sibilants. In the past, denasalization was more common. ę and ą typically decompoze before l, ł and l, ł are lost: wzion (wziął), or n is lost: wzioł. Word finally -ę denasalizes to -e, and -ą can either denasalize to -o (in the accusative singular of feminine adjectives, numerals, and pronouns and the third person plural present/future tense of verbs) or decompose to -om (in the instrumental singular of feminine nouns, adjectives, and pronouns). The younger generation often uses -om for all positions.

==== Prothesis ====
Initial o often labializes to ô as well as after velars.

=== Consonants ===
The Lesser Polish shift of -ch to -k is seen mainly in inflections, such as the locational plural of nouns, the genitive/locative plural of adjectives and pronouns, the past tense ending -ch (byłek) (now uncommon, and often forms such as byłem are used instead). A few instances of this shift can be found in stems, but this is rare: ruk (ruch). This change is not present in the north-east. In the south, sometimes final -ch is weakened: na śtyrech packa (na czterech paczkach). ch- can shift to k- in certain clusters: kfila (chwila), pkać (pchać). Many consonant clusters are simplified: pos (pasł), przyś (przyjść).

== Inflection ==
Typical Lesser Polish inflectional tendencies are found here.

=== Nouns ===
The archaic feminine genitive ending of soft-stem nouns -e can still be seen here with the older generation in the south: do kopalnie, but is being replaced with standard -y/-i. -a is preferred as the genitive singular of masculine nouns: ze dwora. -mi is often levelled to -ami as the instrumental plural: dzieciami, ludziami (dziećmi, ludźmi).

=== Verbs ===
Often -ył, -ił in the past tense shifts to -uł, but only tautosyllabically. Often ablaut is levelled in conjugations: wywieze (wywiozę). Sometimes personal clitics are omitted in the past tense: jo myślała (myślałam). Alternatively, there is a higher tendency to place the personal clitics somewhere other than the verb. The archaic dual endings -wa, -ma, -ta in the forms of the first and second person plurals of the present, past, simple future and imperative mood. The past tense and subjunctive also have -my. Verbs ending in -nąć often do not have -ną-, -nę- in conjugations: zamkli (zamknęli). The active adjectival participle is formed with the archaic -ęcy.

=== Prepositions and prefixes ===
Common is the extension of the prepositions and prefixes w(-), z(-) with mobile e to we(-), ze(-) when before a word starting with a consonant of the same place of articulation. Sometimes other prepositions are also affected by this: ode drogi. The declension of on (and some other pronouns) is often levelled: ónymu (jemu).

== Vocabulary ==
=== Word-Formation ===
Typical Lesser Polish word-formation features can be seen here.

==== Verbs ====
The prefix roz- has lost initial r-, and the following o is often labialized, but this change is slowly being lost, and roz- is often preferred. The archaic prefix s- is often retained: swolać (zwalać). Frequentatives are formed with -ować where in Standard Polish would be -ywać/-iwać.

== Syntax ==
Sometimes bez replaces przez.

== See also ==
- Dialects of the Polish language
- Languages of Europe
- Polish language
