= Babia Góra dialect =

Dialect of Polish spoken in Poland

- Native to: Poland
- Region: Babia Góra
- Language family: Indo-European: Balto-Slavic; Slavic; West Slavic; Lechitic; Polish; Lesser Polish; Babia Góra dialect

Language codes
- ISO 639-3: –

The Babia Góra dialect belongs to the Lesser Poland dialect group and is located in the southern part of Poland. It is in part one of the dialects that belongs to the Goral ethnolect.

== Phonology ==
Typical of Lesser Polish dialects (as well as Greater Polish dialects), voicing of word-final consonants before vowels and liquids is present here. Also typical of Lesser Polish dialects is the presence of mazuration.

=== Vowels ===
The Lechitic ablaut is often absent before hard dental consonants.

==== Slanted vowels ====
Slanted á is retained as á or raises to o. Slanted é raises to y hard consonants and can be y, i, or é after soft consonants. Slanted ó is raised to u.

==== Nasal vowels ====
The Babia Góra dialect displays features common of dialects with a single nasal vowel. ęC and ąC shift to áC. Word finally they generally shift to -á, except in some inflections. Similarly instances of eN shift to oN.

==== Prothesis ====
Labialization of o to ô is common in all positions. Prothesis of other initial vowels is sporadic.

=== Consonants ===
Final -ch shifts to -k mostly in inflections and certain grammatical particles such as niek < niech.

== Inflection ==
Typical Goral inflectional patters are present here.

=== Nouns ===
The feminine accusative singular is -á, and the feminine instrumental singular is -óm. The archaic -e of feminine genitive singular of soft stems is preserved.

=== Adjectives and adverbs ===
The feminine instrumental singular is -óm.

=== Verbs ===
Verbs whose past tense end in -ął, -ęl- shift to -on(V). The third person plural present tense is almost exclusively realized as -á, rarely -óm. The first person present tense is -á.

=== Prepositions and prefixes ===
The prefix roz- is usually realized as ôz-.

== See also ==
- Dialects of the Polish language
- Languages of Europe
- Polish language
