= Węglówka =

Węglówka may refer to:

- Węglówka, Lesser Poland Voivodeship, Poland
- Węglówka, Subcarpathian Voivodeship, Poland
