= Stara Huta =

Stara Huta may refer to:

== Places in Slovakia ==
- Stará Huta, a village in Slovakia

== Places in Poland ==
- Stara Huta, Garwolin County in Masovian Voivodeship (east-central Poland)
- Stara Huta, Gdańsk County in Pomeranian Voivodeship (north Poland)
- Stara Huta, Gmina Kartuzy in Pomeranian Voivodeship (north Poland)
- Stara Huta, Gmina Sierakowice in Pomeranian Voivodeship (north Poland)
- Stara Huta, Greater Poland Voivodeship (west-central Poland)
- Stara Huta, Kuyavian-Pomeranian Voivodeship (north-central Poland)
- Stara Huta, Lower Silesian Voivodeship (south-west Poland)
- Stara Huta, Łuków County in Lublin Voivodeship (east Poland)
- Stara Huta, Silesian Voivodeship (south Poland)
- Stara Huta, Starovyzhivskyi Raion, in Volyn Oblast, Ukraine
- Stara Huta, Subcarpathian Voivodeship (south-east Poland)
- Stara Huta, Świętokrzyskie Voivodeship (south-central Poland)
- Stara Huta, Zamość County in Lublin Voivodeship (east Poland)
- Stara Huta, Żyrardów County in Masovian Voivodeship (east-central Poland)

== Places in Ukraine ==
- Stara Huta, Bohorodchany Raion, a village in Ivano-Frankivsk Oblast
- Stara Huta, Shostka Raion, a village in Sumy Oblast
