= Kliszczak dialect =

Dialect of Polish spoken in Poland

- Native to: Poland
- Region: Southern Poland
- Language family: Indo-European: Balto-Slavic; Slavic; West Slavic; Lechitic; Polish; Lesser Polish; Kliszczak dialect

Language codes
- ISO 639-3: –

The Kliszczak dialect belongs to the Lesser Poland dialect group and is located in the southern part of Poland. It is in part one of the dialects that belongs to the Goral ethnolect.

== Phonology ==
Typical of Lesser Polish dialects (as well as Greater Polish dialects), voicing of word-final consonants before vowels and liquids is present here. Also typical of Lesser Polish dialects is the presence of mazuration.

=== Vowels ===
-e- may be inserted between some consonant clusters: meter (metr). Notably, a common to the region shift of ił, il > to -eł, -el/-ył, -yl is absent here. i was retained after rz by older speakers, but now merges with y. The Lechitic ablaut is often absent before hard dental consonants. The so-called “Podhalanian archaism” is partially present here; after etymological cz, ż, sz (now c, z, s) as well as after etymological cy, zy, sy, i is retained.

==== Slanted vowels ====
Slanted á is retained as á or raises to o, but is more commonly raised as to o, especially since the middle of the 20th century. Slanted é raises to y after both hard and soft consonants. Slanted ó is retained as ó.

==== Nasal vowels ====
In the south, both nasals are merged into a single nasal vowel. Otherwise, ęC and ąC tend to decompose to yN and oN, especially in modern times, except before sibilants, where nasality can be retained. Final -ę was often retained in the first person singular present of verbs and feminine accusative singular of nouns, at least historically. Final -ą often retained nasality, at least historically, in the third person plural present of verbs and in the accusative feminine singular of adjectives, numerals and pronouns. Final -ą usually decomposes to -om in the instrumental feminine singular of nouns, adjectives, numerals and pronouns.

==== Prothesis ====
Labialization of o to ô is common in all positions, but strongest initially. This often leads to hypercorrections: opata (łopata). Initial a- usually gains a prothetic j- in certain words. Prothetic h- may be inserted before other initial vowels including a-, but is usually restricted to particular words.

=== Consonants ===
Final -ch strengthens to -k in all contexts, i.e. in both stems and in morphological endings. ch can shift to k also in cluster: kcieć (chcieć). trz, strz, drz usually simplify to cz, szcz, dż. źr is present instead of jrz. n does not assimilate to a velar nasal consonant before velar consonants. Final and pre-sibilant ń often shifts to j and nasalizes the previous vowel. ł is often lost after other consonants.

== Inflection ==
Common Goral inflectional patterns are present in this dialect.

=== Nouns ===
-owi is used for the dative for all masculine nouns and also in the masculine locative singular - this replaced the ending -owiu (as a result of contamination of -u and -owi) that was used in the 20th century. -a is preferred for the masculine genitive singular over -u. The nominative plural of collective virile nouns is formed with -á/-o instead of -owie. The archaic -e of feminine genitive singular of soft stems is preserved.

=== Adjectives and adverbs ===
Final -ej shifts to -y (after hard consonants), -i (after soft consonants). However, within the pronoun ten, the feminine genitive singular (te) is distinguished from the feminine dative singular (ty). The superlative may be formed with either no- or noj-.

=== Verbs ===
Verbs whose past tense end in -ął, -ęl- shift to -on and -en(V) respectively. The aorist is retained in the first person singular, with a shift of -ch > -k: byłek (byłem), and can also be seen in the first person conditional: rôbiłbyk (robiłbym). być often takes analytical declensions: jo jest (jestem), sǫmy/my sǫ (jesteśmy), já byó (byłem), my byli (byliśmy). The contemporary adverbial participle is formed with -yncy instead of -ąc. Certain verb declensions are leveled from r||rz to r||r: bieres (bierzesz), but this is restricted to certain words.

=== Prepositions and prefixes ===
The prefix roz- is usually realized as ôz-. z- and z are often archaically retained as s- and s- and allophonically realized as ś- and ś.

== Vocabulary ==
=== Word-Formation ===
Word-formation tendencies typical of southern Poland are present here as well.

==== Nouns ====
-on is often used instead of -anin.

==== Adjectives ====
Possessive adjectives may be formed with -in.

==== Verbs ====
Iteratives are often formed with -ować instead of -ywać/-iwać.

==== Pronouns ====
Indefinite pronouns as well as adverbs of location are often formed with -si or -sik.

== Syntax ==
Atypical of Polish dialects, masculine personal and masculine animal nouns are often not levelled. Plural forms may be used as a form of respect.

== See also ==
- Dialects of the Polish language
- Languages of Europe
- Polish language
