= Jabłonkowanie =

Merger of sibilants in Polish dialects

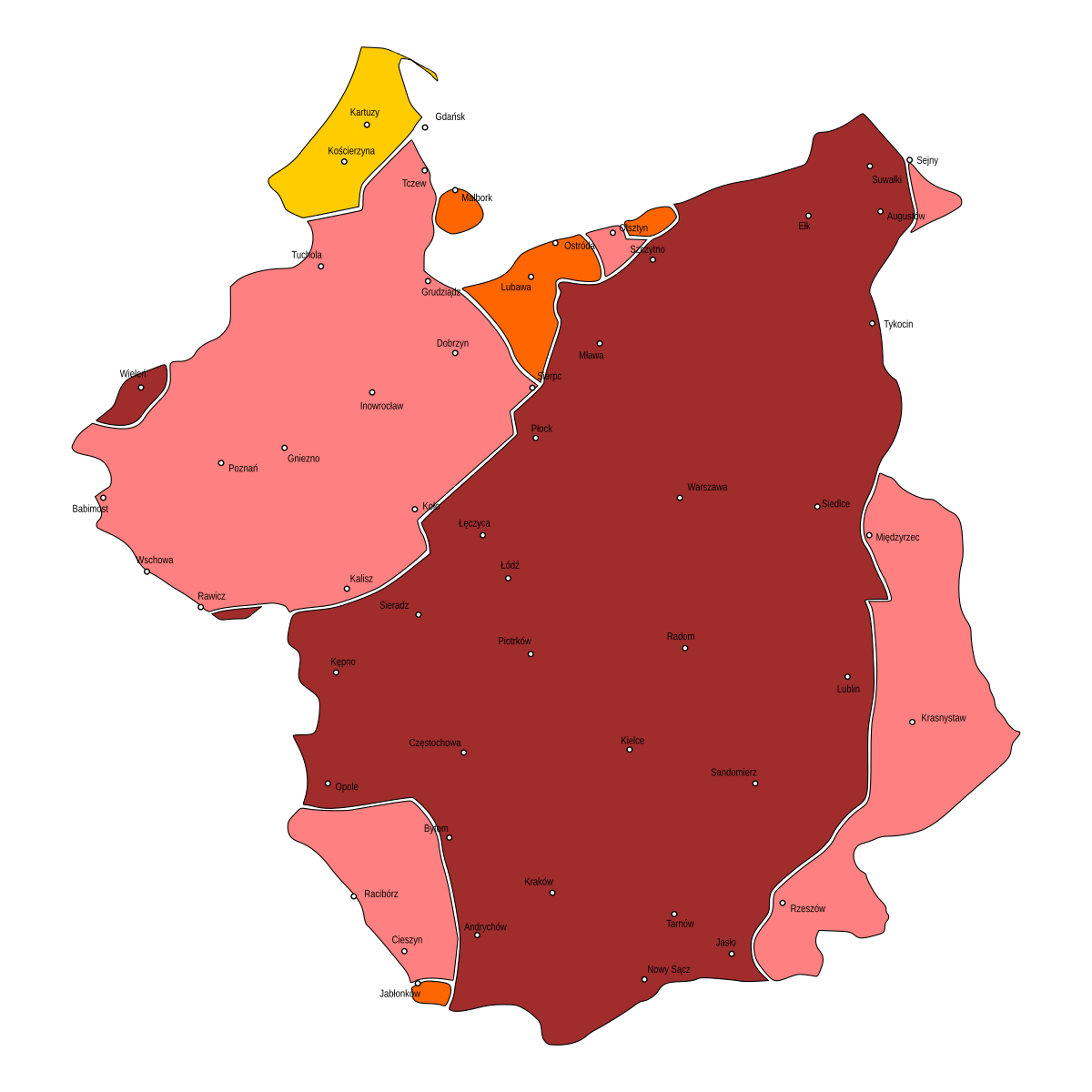
Map of Polish dialects. Dialects with jabłonkowanie are shown in orange.

Jabłonkowanie (Polish: [jabwɔŋkɔˈvaɲɛ]) or siakanie (Polish: [ɕaˈkaɲɛ]) is a regional phonological feature of the Polish language. It consists of the merger of the series of retroflex sibilants /ʂ/, /t͡ʂ/, /ʐ/, /d͡ʐ/ ⟨sz, cz, ż, dż⟩ and palatal sibilants /ɕ/, /t͡ɕ/, /ʑ/, /d͡ʑ/ ⟨ś, ć, ź, dź⟩ into a phonetically-intermediate series [ʃʲ], [t͡ʃʲ], [ʒʲ], [d͡ʒʲ] (sometimes written ⟨śz, ćz, źż, dźż⟩).

It is named after the Jabłonków subdialect of Polish (named after the town of Jabłonków in Cieszyn Silesia). It occurs in a number of other Polish subdialects.

The feature is linked to the process of dispalatalization (reducing of the number of palatalized consonants) similar to the phenomena of mazurzenie and kaszubienie in other dialects.
