= West Slavic languages =

Subdivision of the Slavic language group

West Slavic
- West Slavonic
- Geographic distribution: Central Europe, East Europe
- Ethnicity: West Slavs
- Linguistic classification: Indo-European: Balto-Slavic; Slavic; West Slavic
- Early forms: Proto-Indo-European: Proto-Balto-Slavic; Proto-Slavic; Old West Slavic
- Subdivisions: Czech–Slovak; Lechitic; Sorbian; Lach

Language codes
- ISO 639-5: zlw
- Glottolog: west2792
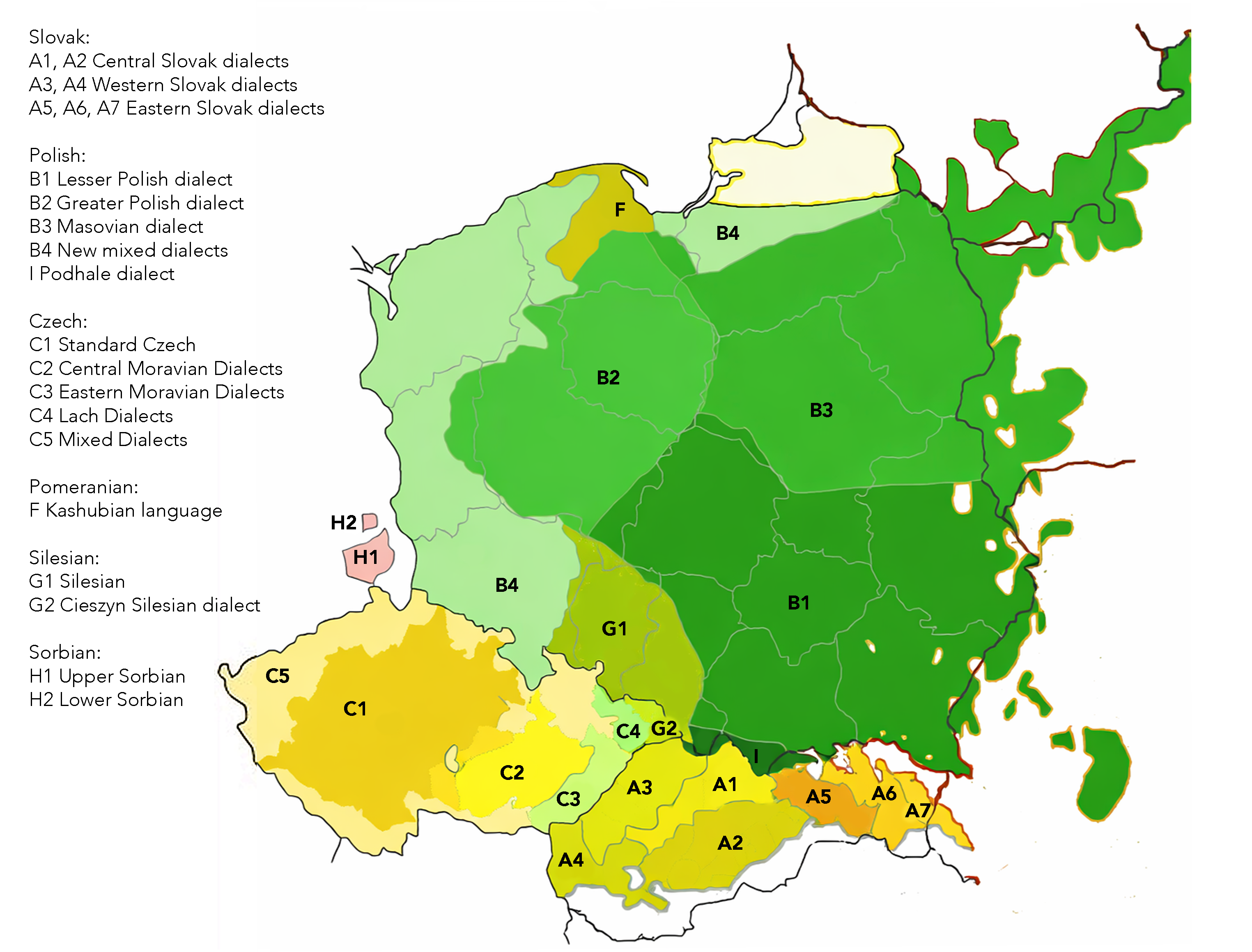
- Distribution of the West Slavic languages and dialects.

The West Slavic languages are a subdivision of the Slavic language group. They include Polish, Czech, Slovak, Kashubian, Silesian, Upper Sorbian and Lower Sorbian. The languages have traditionally been spoken across a mostly continuous region encompassing the Czech Republic, Slovakia, Poland, the westernmost regions of Ukraine and Belarus, and part of eastern Lithuania. In addition, there are several language islands such as the Sorbian areas in Lusatia in Germany, and Slovak areas in Hungary and elsewhere.

== Classification ==
West Slavic is usually divided into three subgroups—Czech–Slovak, Lechitic and Sorbian—based on similarity and degree of mutual intelligibility. The groupings are as follows:

- West Slavic
  - Lechitic
    - Polish
    - Pomeranian
      - Kashubian
      - Slovincian †
    - Polabian †
  - Sorbian
    - Lower Sorbian
    - Upper Sorbian
  - Czech–Slovak
    - Czech
    - Slovak

The Max Planck Institute for Evolutionary Anthropology classifies the West Slavic languages within their Glottolog database as follows:

- West Slavic
  - Czech–Slovak
    - Czech (Note: Knaanic is classified as a dialect of Czech under the name "West Judeo-Slavic".)
    - Slovak
  - Lechitic
    - Polish–Silesian
      - Polish
      - Silesian
    - Kashubian (Note: Slovincian is classified as a dialect of Kashubian.)
    - Polabian †
  - Sorbian
    - Lower Sorbian
    - Upper Sorbian

Some linguists include Upper and Lower Sorbian in the Lechitic branch, but other linguists regard it as a separate branch. The reason for this is that 'the Sorbian dialects are extremely diverse, and there are virtually no linguistic features common to all Sorbian dialects which distinguish them as a group from the other Slavic languages' (Sussex & Cubberley 2006). Czech and Slovak are more closely related to each other than to the other West Slavic languages, and also closer to each other than Polish and Sorbian are. Czecho-Slovak (Slovak in particular) shares certain features with other Slavic languages, such as Slovene and BCMS.

== Distinctive features ==
Some distinctive features of the West Slavic languages, as from when they split from the East Slavic and South Slavic branches around the 3rd to 6th centuries AD (alternatively, between the 6th and 10th centuries), are as follows:

- Development of Proto-Slavic *tj, *dj into palatalized ts, (d)z, as in modern Polish/Czech/Slovak noc ("night"; compare Russian ночь (noch));
- Retention of the groups kv, gv as in Polish kwiat ("flower"); gwiazda ("star") (Compare Russian цвет (cvet); звезда (zvezda));
- Retention of tl, dl, as in Polish/Slovak/Czech radło/radlo/rádlo ("ard"; compare Russian рало);
- Palatized x developed into š, as in Polish musze (locative case of mucha, "fly");
- The groups pj, bj, mj, vj developed into (soft) consonant forms without the epenthesis of l, as in Polish kupię ("I shall buy"; compare Russian куплю);
- A tendency towards fixed stress (on the first syllable in Czech and Slovak and on the penultimate syllable in Polish);
- Use of the endings -ego or -ého for the genitive singular of the adjectival declension;
- Extension of the accusative form *tъnъ to nominative in place of *tъ, leading to Slovak/Polish/Czech ten ("this" (masc.); compare Russian тот; Old Church Slavonic тъ);
- Extension of the genitive form *čьso to nominative and accusative in place of čь(to), leading to Polish/Czech co ("what", compare Russian что; OCS чьто, genitive чьсо).

Although influences from other language families have contributed a large number of loanwords, and to a lesser extent to verb morphology and syntax, the Slavic languages retained a distinctly Slavic character, with clear roots in Indo-European.

The West Slavic languages are all written in the Latin script, while the East Slavic branch uses Cyrillic and the South Slavic branch is mixed.

== History ==
The early Slavic expansion reached Central Europe in c. the 7th century, and the West Slavic dialects diverged from Common Slavic over the following centuries. West Slavic polities of the 9th century include the Principality of Nitra and Great Moravia. The West Slavic tribes settled on the eastern fringes of the Carolingian Empire, along the Limes Saxoniae. The Obotrites were given territories by Charlemagne in exchange for their support in his war against the Saxons.

In the high medieval period, the West Slavic tribes were again pushed to the east by the incipient German Ostsiedlung, decisively so following the Wendish Crusade in the 11th century. The Sorbs and other Polabian Slavs like Obodrites and Veleti came under the domination of the Holy Roman Empire and were strongly Germanized.

The Bohemians established the Duchy of Bohemia in the 9th century, which was incorporated into the Holy Roman Empire in the early 11th century. At the end of the 12th century the duchy was raised to the status of kingdom, which was legally recognized in 1212 in the Golden Bull of Sicily. Lusatia, the homeland of the remaining Sorbs, became a crown land of Bohemia in the 11th century, and Silesia followed suit in 1335. The Slovaks, on the other hand, never became part of the Holy Roman Empire, being incorporated into the Kingdom of Hungary. Hungary fell under Habsburg rule alongside Austria and Bohemia in the 16th century, thus uniting the Bohemians, Moravians, Slovaks, and Silesians under a single ruler. While Lusatia was lost to Saxony in 1635 and most of Silesia was lost to Prussia in 1740, the remaining West Slavic Habsburg dominions remained part of the Austrian Empire and then Austria-Hungary, and after that remained united until 1992 in the form of Czechoslovakia.

Over the past century, there have been efforts by some to standardize and to recognize Silesian, Lachian, and Moravian as separate languages.

== See also ==
- West Slavs – Subgroup of Slavic peoples
- Comparison of Czech and Slovak
- Outline of Slavic history and culture

== Bibliography ==
- Sussex, Roland; Cubberley, Paul (2006). The Slavic Languages. Cambridge University Press. ISBN 9780521223157.
