= Bydgoszcz dialect =

Polish urban dialect of Bydgoszcz

- gwara bydgoska
- Pronunciation: [ɡvara bɨdˈɡɔska]
- Native to: Poland
- Region: Bydgoszcz, northern Kuyavia
- Language family: Indo-European: Balto-Slavic; Slavic; West Slavic; Lechitic; Polish; Greater Polish; Bydgoszcz dialect

Language codes
- ISO 639-3: –

The Bydgoszcz dialect (Polish: gwara bydgoska) is an urban subdialect (gwara miejska) of the Polish language characteristic of the inhabitants of the city of Bydgoszcz (German: Bromberg). It belongs to the northern part of the Greater Poland dialect group and developed in a transitional linguistic zone, bordering dialect areas of Kuyavia to the south, Kociewie and Bory Tucholskie from the north, Chełmno-Dobrzyń from the east, and Krajna as well as Northern Greater Poland (Pałuki) from the west. The dialect is slowly losing many features and replacing them with those from Standard Polish.

== History ==
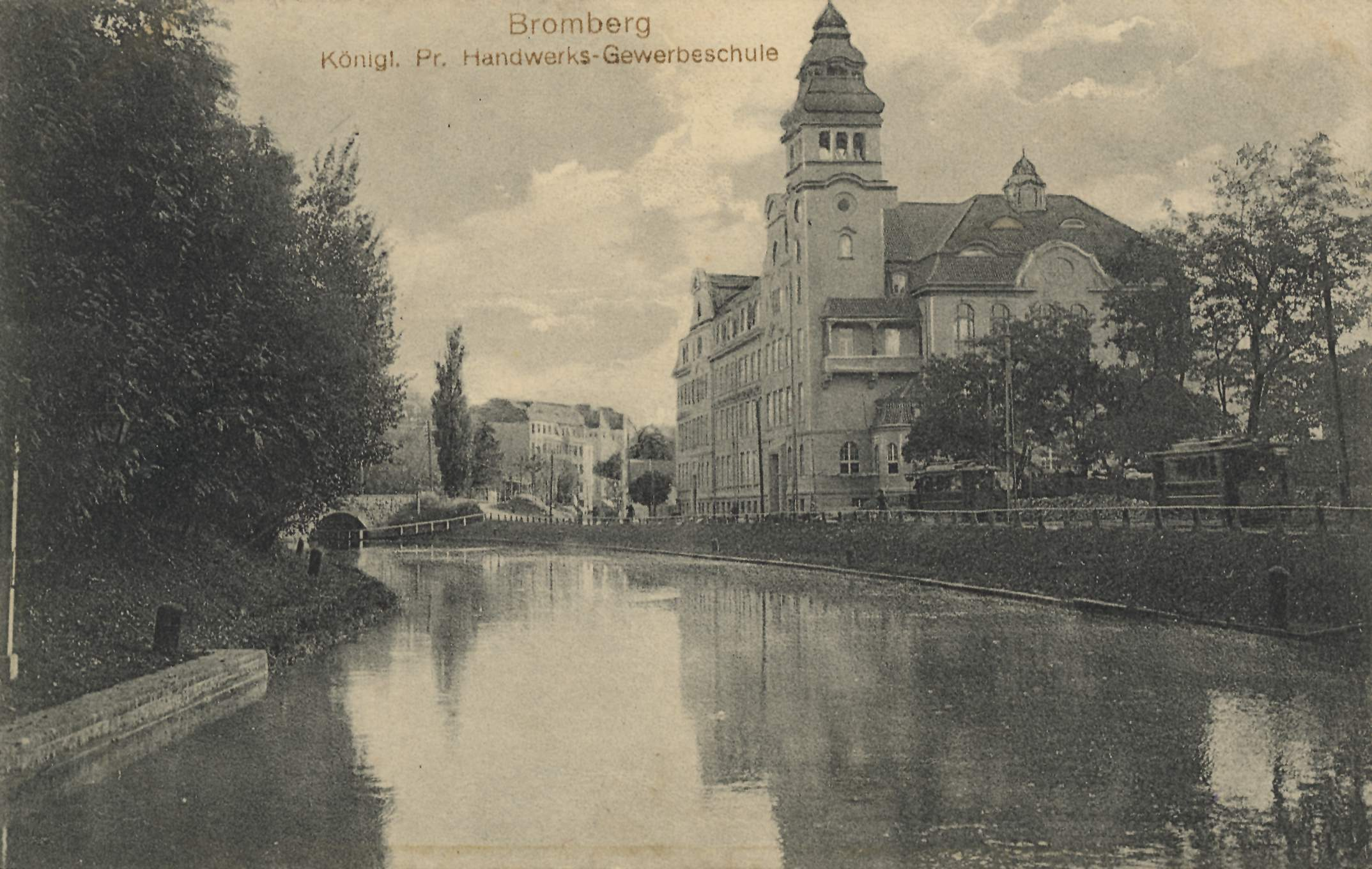
The first wave of German colonisation was connected to the construction of Bydgoszcz Canal in the late 18th century.

The precise linguistic character of Bydgoszcz prior to the Partitions of Poland remains uncertain. Although administratively part of the region of Kuyavia (Inowrocław Voivodeship), there remains no direct evidence confirming that the city's inhabitants spoke a fully developed Kuyavian dialect. Likewise, no documentation demonstrates that Bydgoszcz formed a clearly defined transitional dialect zone between Kuyavia and Pomerelia. Historical political boundaries did not necessarily correspond to linguistic ones, and the early modern period lacks sufficient sources to reconstruct the vernacular speech of the city with certainty.

Importantly, as a river port engaged in commercial exchange with major trade centers such as Gdańsk, Bydgoszcz likely displayed greater linguistic heterogeneity than surrounding agrarian communities.

Before the Prussian annexation in 1772, the city had already experienced significant depopulation due to events such as the Swedish Deluge, the Great Northern War, and recurrent epidemics. This reduction of the indigenous population set the stage for substantial demographic changes under Prussian administration. Following its incorporation into the Kingdom of Prussia, Bromberg underwent rapid economic, industrial, administrative, and infrastructural redevelopment. This growth attracted a large influx of German-speaking settlers, officials, craftsmen, and merchants. As a result, the native Polish-speaking population became a minority within the urban environment, while intensive daily contact with German speakers fostered widespread bilingualism and led to the incorporation of German lexical elements into local Polish speech.

Geography and migration patterns further shaped the city's emerging linguistic profile. Bydgoszcz is surrounded by extensive forest complexes, the Tuchola Forest (Bory Tucholskie) to the north and the Bydgoszcz Forest (Puszcza Bydgoska) to the south and east, and is adjacent to the Vistula floodplain, which saw the settlement of Olenders, people of various ethnic origin. These natural barriers limited interaction with surrounding rural communities, contributing to the city's ethnographic distinctiveness. In addition, the city's position in the northern part of Kuyavia, rather than its center, and its growing economic importance attracting Polish migrants from neighboring regions with diverse linguistic traditions resulted in the speech incorporating various regional Polish elements alongside German loanwords.

In the middle of the 19th century, an ethnographer Oskar Kolberg classified the vernacular of Bydgoszcz as part of the Kuyavian lexicon, while also noting its distinctiveness and pointing out the growing Germanization of the area. (Note: "Bydgoszcz, Fordon, and Koronowo still belong to the Vistulan part of Kuyavia, although those places today are heavily Germanized. [...] Towns are already half-German and all the area adjacent to the Vistula river from Toruń up to Bydgoszcz's surroundings, including this city, have been subject to Germanization".)

After Poland regained independence in 1918 (and all the more in 1945), a substantial portion of the German population left the city. The remaining inhabitants were often bilingual or semi-bilingual, and the urban vernacular continued to function as a Polish-based speech variety enriched with German loanwords and expressions, as well as lexical contributions from internal Polish migration. At the same time, Bydgoszcz experienced an influx of Polish newcomers from various regions of the reborn state, bringing with them diverse regional linguistic features.

The uniformisation of the language spoken throughout Poland under the influence of the mass media (such as television and radio) led to a decline in speakers of all the regional varieties of Polish, the Bydgoszcz dialect included.

Among the notable artists who used the Bydgoszcz dialect in its written form are Jerzy Sulima-Kamiński, Wiesław Rogowski, Tadeusz Nowakowski, Janina Biedowicz, and Zbigniew Raszewski.

== Classification ==
The Bydgoszcz dialect belongs to the Greater Poland dialect group of Polish. Due to its geographic location it shows transitional features influenced by adjacent regions. (Note: "The demonstrated similarities and differences in the lexical layer of the urban dialect of Bydgoszcz and the folk dialect of Kociewie region provide grounds for concluding that inhabitants of Bydgoszcz drew not only from Kuyavian culture, but were also, to a considerable extent, subject to Pomeranian influences. [...] It is difficult to deny that geographically neighboring regions are usually culturally connected, which also applies to similarities in the linguistic layer. Placing Bydgoszcz solely within the sphere of Kuyavian culture, with the additional distinction of the presence of Germanisms resulting from historical circumstances, is therefore more of an understatement. It should be emphasized that the capital of the [Kuyavian] region is simultaneously – if not mainly – culturally, and especially linguistically, connected with Pomerelia as well.") Unlike the Poznań dialect, which developed on a Central Greater Polish base, or the Kraków dialect, which was rooted in the Lesser Polish dialect group, the Bydgoszcz dialect represents a northern Greater Poland urban variety with mixed borderland influences.

== Vocabulary ==
Lexical forms found in Bydgoszcz dialect either are German loanwords, some of which are typical to Polish dialects of various areas under the German administration (Prussian Partition and Upper Silesia), are derived from adjacent dialects, are archaisms, or are unique to the inhabitants of Bydgoszcz.

Most notable words include:

- ja as "yes" (more traditional, direct German influence), likewise jo (more provincial, Pomeranian influence)
- statki / statory as "dishes”
- rojber as "rascal" (from German Räuber, semantic shift)
- bana as "train" (from German Bahn)
- klamoty as "stuff; junk" (from German Klamotten)
- dek(i)el as "lid; head; moron" (from German Deckel, semantic shift)
- na opa / na opka as "in one's arms, on one's lap, piggyback" (infantile)
- na szago / na szagę as "crosswise" (from German schräg)
- chruchlać as "to cough" (northern influence), hence also chruchel, likewise church(l)ać (southern influence)
- zebuć (się) as "to take off, undress"
- dycht as "entirely" (from German dicht)
- gzub as "kid"
- strugać as "to peel" (e.g. potatoes)
- zaś as "later; again" (semantic shift from standard "while"), hence also na zaś
- p(l)apa as "face, mouth" (from German Plappe)
- fest as "a lot, heavily; great, strong; big, stout" (from German, semantic shift)
- wygogolony / rozgogolony as "scantily clad"
- kamlot as "stone; obstacle; liability"
- zaklepka as "soup slurry"
- skiełczeć as "to groan"
- skład as "shop, store"
- nabierka as "ladle"
- bimba as "tram, streetcar" (from German Bimmelbahn)
- winkiel as "(street) corner" (from German Winkel)
- obłożyć as "to spread" (e.g. bread with butter), hence also obkład
- badeje / badejki as "swimming trunks" (from German Badehose)
- ostrzółka as "pencil sharpener"
- durch as "still; fully" (from German, semantic shift)
- antek as "immigrant, foreigner, newbie"
- faflunić as "to slur, mumble; get dirty"
- szlaberek as "a bib", hence also szlabrować (cf. southern ślabrać or ślabrotać)
- bambosze as "slippers" (from German Bamboschen)
- laczki / lacze as "casual shoes" (from German Latschen)
- dukać as "to mash", hence also dukane ziemniaki
- doś(ć) as "(how) much" (semantic shift from standard "enough")
- fyrtel as "neighbourhood" (from German Viertel)
- fu(n)dnąć as "to fund, finance" (from German fundieren)
- żagować as "to saw; snore" (semantic shift from German Säge), hence also żaga
- bratnik as "oven" (from German braten)
- fybra as "cold sore" (from German Fieber, semantic shift)
- jubel as "mess; carouse" (from German, semantic shift)
- dynks as "thingy" (from German Dings)
- sznytka as "slice of bread" (from German Schnitte), likewise skibka
- ancug as "suit" (from German Anzug)
- buksy as "pants" (from German Buxe)
- bombka / bombeczka as "portion of vodka"
- szczun as "boy, rowdy, brat"
- pozbaś(ć) as "to subordinate"
- szwung as "zest, spirit" (from German Schwung)
- kibel as "trash can" (from German Kübel, semantic shift)
- ochlapus as "drinker; slob", likewise chleja (cf. chlejus)
- na posmakę as "taste-test" (northern influence), likewise na spróbę (southern influence)
- cukrować as "to sugar"
- rychtych / rychtyk as "indeed; right; quick; well-done" (from German richtig)
- rukcug as "in no time" (from German ruck zuck)
- heksa as "witch; fury" (from German Hexe)
- listowy as "mailman"
- kunda as "client; smarty-pants, tramp, sly dog" (from German Kunde)
- frechowny as "audacious, sassy" (from German frech)
- bombon(s)y as "candies" (from German Bonbon)
- szprachać as "to beg; lament"
- jeno / ino as "only" (preserved/modified archaism)
- ful as "a lot; full; enough" (from German voll)
- giry as "legs"
- guła as "fool"
- tanta as "aunt" (from German Tante)
- bamber as "farmer; money bug; yahoo"
- fertyś as "done; ready" (from German fertig)
- (mieć) recht as "(be) right" (from German)
- angst as "angst, fear" (from German)
- antrejka as "antechamber, porch" (from German Entree)
- fuzle as "scraps"
- zamanąwszy as "out of the blue; from time to time; supposedly"
- sznufrować as "to search, fumble, trail" (from German schnüffeln)
- na fleku as "strong, youthful, in good shape"
- szneka as "sweet bun" (from German Schnecke, semantic shift)
- kuch as "pie" (from German Kuchen)
- lompy / lumpy as "clothes" (from German Lumpen)
- lump as "hooligan" (from German), likewise luj, hence also lujostwo
- toć as "after all" (preserved archaism)
- (iść) hasiu / haśku as "(to go to) sleep" (infantile), likewise ziuziu / ziuźku (northern) or nyny (southern) (cf. lulu)
- knypel as "knife" (from German Knüppel, semantic shift)
- dyd / dydek as "teat; pacifier"
- klapsztula as "sandwich" (from German Klappstulle)
- luntrus as "hooligan"
- pikle as "pimples, acne" (from German Pickel)
- szmuchel as "scam, intrigue, fraud" (from German Schmuggel, semantic shift)
- ajnfach as "easy; simply" (from German einfach)
- ajntop(f) as "stew, pottage, thick soup" (from German Eintopf)
- pyry / pyrki as "potatoes"
- tytka / tutka as "bag" (from German Tüte)
- chęchy as "scrub, bushes"
- brawędzić as "to brag, bore”
- babok / babol as "wraith; crusty dragon"
- zakluczyć as "to lock"
- nadusić as "to press"
- plachander as "tramp, prattler" (from German), hence also plachandrować
- ginol as "nose"
- akuratny as "proper, exact" (from German akkurat)
- futrować as "to feed" (from German füttern)
- rychtować (się) as "to prepare (oneself)" (from German richten)
- lufrować / lofrować as "to wander" (from German laufen), hence also na lofry
- bryle as "eyeglasses" (from German Brille)

Local toponyms nowadays include Bydzia, a clipped, hypocoristic form of the city name, Kapy as Kapuściska, Młyny or Wyspa referring to Mill Island, Myśl that is used for the park Myślęcinek, and company-related terms like Żan (mispronounced "Géant", which has become a lexicalized local label for the first shopping centre in the city, used for the building even though the original store chain no longer exists) or zachemowski (adjective taken from the disbanded chemical plant that shaped a part of the city's history). In addition, certain words carry cultural significance of the whole region: Gwiazdor and Gwiazdka denote Santa Claus and Christmas, and Przyjęcie refers specifically to First Communion ceremonies.

== Phonology ==
The basic phonology of the Bydgoszcz dialect is based on the standard Polish language with some differences, many typical for the Greater Poland dialect group. These tendencies in colloquial speech, reflecting either various dialectal influences (patterns phonological or lexicalised) or linguistic economy, may include:

- depalatalization of velar consonants before front vowels, for instance kedy, druge, or cuker instead of kiedy, drugie, or cukier, which may lead to hypercorrective rękie or gięsi instead of rękę or gęsi;
- depalatalization of bilabial nasal [mʲ] in endings, for instance nogamy instead of nogami and in pronouns mi and mnie realised as my and me;
- vowel /e/ reduction after /j/ or palatalization, e.g. późnij, wynajm, cimno, kobita, umi, rozumisz;
- vowel raising of /a/ before tautosyllabic /j/ like in tutej, dej, or wczorej, and of /e/ unstressed like in dalej → dalyj/dalij or owszem → owszym;
- vowel rounding after nasalisation, as in nie mo instead of nie ma;
- a context-dependent shift from the front vowel [i] toward a more central/lower vowel, as in chwyla (hard /w/), poszlyśmy (hard /l/), and ydę or dzięky (syllable-edge position & high-frequency) instead of chwila, poszliśmy, idę and dzięki;
- vowel raising in which /o/ is realized as /u/ preserved in coś, doktor, or dopiero pronounced as cóś, doktór, or dopieru;
- consonant cluster reductions and affricate simplifications:
  - among cluster reductions (syllable initial gd-: [g]dzie; medial liquids -l- and -r-: a[l]bo, ty[l]ko, no[r]ma[l]nie; final syllables like -dś, -zn, -szcz, -ść, -st, -zd: doką[d]ś, mężczyz[n], desz[cz], doś[ć], zamias[t], wjaz[d]; groupings like kuja[w]ski, du[r]szlak, mart[w] się, przypuś[ć]my), bilabial regressive assimilation like in o[d]biera or prze[d]płata, unreleased stops or coarticulation like podczas or nikt [t̚], płótno [tⁿ], biegnij [ɡⁿ], róbmy [pᵐ], jedna [dⁿ], siódma [dᵐ], and elision of syllable-initial /w/ in phrases like [w]szyscy, [w]zgórze, [w]sparcie or [w] domu, there is a simplification of /trz/ and /drz/ single-syllable sequences, like in trzeba as czeba ([tʂ] → [t͡ʂ]) and drzewo as dżewo ([dʐ] → [d͡ʐ]), as well as phonetic shifts like drzwi pronounced as dźwi, miękki as mięki, klatce as klacce, elegancki as eleganski, or przecież as przesież ([dʐ] → [d͡ʐ] → [d͡ʑ], [kː] → [k], [tt͡s] → [t̚t͡s] → [t͡sː], [t͡s] → [s], [t͡ɕ] → [ɕ]);
- modifications for palatal and labio-velar semivowels:
  - loss of /j/ before palatal obstruents (in words like pó[j]dziesz, przy[j]dzie, przy[j]ść); for /ł/, if not realised as dark l: vocalization (kupił → kupjuł), loss in final clusters (móg[ł], zamys[ł], wlaz[ł], zmar[ł]), next to /u/ (pó[ł]tora, d[ł]ugi, dó[ł], s[ł]uchaj), in medial clusters (g[ł]owa, kie[ł]basa), and intervocalically (by[ł]em, widzia[ł]a, ko[ł]o, kawa[ł]ek);
- in high-frequency lexical items, as typical for casual Polish:
  - apocope like zara[z], przecie[ż], cho[dź], zoba[cz], pa[trz], dobrz[e], prosz[ę], and intervocalic consonant elision as in cie[b]ie, niko[g]o, to[b]ą, prze[c]ież, trze[b]a, so[b]ie, nie [w]iem, prze[d]e wszystkim;
- morphologically-conditioned voicing in words like ślizgo instead of ślisko;
- variable inter-word phonetics, as the dialect lies in a transitional area between Kraków–Poznań type voicing and Warsaw type devoicing patterns (brat matki vs. brad matki, ktoś idzie vs. ktoź idzie);
- replacement of -ak by -ok preserved in words like kurczok, świniok, dzieciok, or pijok for augmentative style;
- compared to other dialects, absence of prothetic glides (j-, w-, ł-) before vowel-initial words and of mazuration;
- fortition of velar fricative in clusters ([x] → [k]), as in chrzan pronounced as krzan, likewise chrzest, na wierzchu, or chciwy, as well as possible drop in clusters proceeded by affricates like in [ch]cesz or [ch]ciała;
- the occurrence of mobile e, as in wiater, we wannie, or zeżarł instead of wiatr, w wannie, or zżarł, may lead to hypercorrective swetr instead of sweter;
- regressive assimilation of nasals, e.g. weźnie or weznę instead of weźmie or wezmę, alongside nasal cluster reduction, e.g. m[n]iej, ziem[n]iaki;
- decomposition of nasal vowels;
- the levelling of ablaut alternations, for example niesę and wzięłeś instead of niosę and wziąłeś;
- rising intonation influenced by German pitch accent, especially noticeable at the end of questions.

== Grammar and inflection ==
The Bydgoszcz dialect is characterized by the integration of German-inspired particle-verb constructions iść precz (instead of standard iść, meaning "go out" or "go away"), być precz ("be away"), and wziąć precz ("put away" or "set aside"). Particles weg or ab may be used as directly borrowed from German. The dialect also employs reflexive pronouns in contexts where everyday Polish would not require them, for example usiąść się ("sit down", cf. German sich setzen), or creates nuances like different inflection (e.g. schować as schów, schowię instead of schowaj, schowam), or the singular noun perfum (cf. German das Parfüm), which officially appears only in the plural. It features phrases structurally different from standard Polish, such as zrobić łóżko (instead of pościelić, "make a bed"), favours resultative passive forms such as mieć wypite ("be drunk") or mieć ugotowane ("have cooked"), and incorporates idiomatic constructions like siekło kogoś ("went crazy/got sick", lit. "was hit"), co ja za to mogę ("I can't do anything about it", lit. "what can I for it", cf. German was kann ich dafür), or mi to nie robi ("it does not matter to me", lit. "for me it does not", cf. German es macht mir nichts aus). Another trait is extended usage of the preposition za, as in patrzeć za czymś ("look for something"), czekać za lekarzem ("wait for a doctor"), or być jakiś/mieć coś za ojcem ("to be like/inherit from one's father"), likewise the preposition na in place of w in phrases denoting a state of dress, as in na gaciach ("in [only] underwear"), na skarpetkach, or na krótkim rękawku, parallel to the standard Polish phrase na boso ("barefoot"), as well as semantic extension of the adverb wtedy, used as "that being so", paralleling German dann ("then"). Notable is the appearance of phatic or tag-question particles like Przyszedł, nie?, or Umyj mi to, ja?, with the latter functioning also as nodding, disbelief, or acknowledgement, extending function of a similar standard Polish no ("yeah").

Adding the suffix -kaj, borrowed from northern dialects, creates diminutive imperative verbs such as jedzkaj, weźkaj, or śpijkaj, mostly addressed to children, as opposed to formal -że forms zróbże, chodźże, or śpijże. Similarly, an ending -ko is used for diminutive adverbs like zimko, ciemko, mocko instead of standard zimno, ciemno, mocno. In casual speech, other inflectional or morphosyntactic tendencies, usually considered provincial or humorous, include the reduction of the third-person singular of "to be" to je[st], the reduction of the first person plural ending -my to ‑m (as in będziem for będziemy), the reduction of -nę- morpheme in past tense verbs (as in zamkłam), for some nouns the generalization of -li as a past-tense plural ending regardless of gender (as in nogi bolali) or dwa numeral for feminine nouns (as in dwa krowy), agreement irregularities (as in dobre ludzie), the use of -owi instead of -u for the masculine dative (as in dać ojcowi), and the extension of -ów as a genitive plural ending to all genders (as in drzwiów or talerzów). Preservation of verb ending -ta for the second personal plural, stemming from former dual forms, may be encountered in informal settings or signal impoliteness, e.g. zobaczyta.

== Bibliography ==
- Dyszak, Andrzej S. (2025). Nowy słownik gwary miejskiej bydgoszczan (2nd ed.). Uniwersytet Kazimierza Wielkiego. ISBN 978-83-8018-715-3. (online info: https://nowawydawtest.ukw.edu.pl/produkt/nowy-slownik-gwary-miejskiej-bydgoszczan/)
- Dyszak, Andrzej S. Codzienny język mieszkańców Bydgoszczy zapisany w tekstach literackich. Etnolingwistyka. Problemy Języka i Kultury, [S.l.], v. 31, p. 277, oct. 2019. ISSN 0860-8032. Date accessed: 16 feb. 2026 doi:10.17951/et.2019.31.277
- Dyszak, Andrzej S. (2015). Gwara miejska bydgoszczan. Uniwersytet Kazimierza Wielkiego. ISBN 978-83-8018-027-7
- Dyszak, Andrzej S. (2008). Jak mówili bydgoszczanie: mały słownik gwary bydgoskiej. Towarzystwo Miłośników Miasta Bydgoszczy. ISBN 978-83-916178-8-5
- Dyszak, Andrzej S. (2023). Literacko‑językowe obrazy Bydgoszczy. Miasto, wydarzenia, ludzie, język. Uniwersytet Kazimierza Wielkiego. ISBN 978-83-8018-579-1
- Święcicka, Małgorzata. Kilka uwag o gwarze najstarszych bydgoszczan.
- Święcicka, Małgorzata. O bydgoskich studiach językoznawczych z perspektywy redaktora naukowego monografii zbiorowych.
- Święcicka, Małgorzata. „Jak bydgoszczanin z bydgoszczaninem", czyli o języku w Bydgoszczy.
- Święcicka, Małgorzata. (2006) Bydgoszcz – przestrzeń miejska zróżnicowana językowo.
- Dyszak, Andrzej S. (2018). Germanizmy bydgoskie na tle polsko-niemieckich kontaktów językowych.
- Jeleniewski, Marek. Kim są bydgoszczanie? (2018). Kronika Bydgoska, 39, 277–288.
- Polszczyzna bydgoszczan. Historia i współczesność, red. M. Święcicka, Bydgoszcz
- Kołatka, Krzysztof. Flora i fauna w leksyce gwarowej Borów Tucholskich i Krajny – podobieństwa i różnice.
- Szczawiński, Radosław (2023). Wpływ niemieckiego pochodzenia mieszkańców i niemieckiej przeszłości Bydgoszczy na proces przyjmowania kandydatów na Niemiecką Listę Narodową – głos w dyskusji.
- Dyszak, Andrzej. Dialektyzmy wielkopolskie w mowie mieszkańców Bydgoszczy.
- Krawczyk-Tyrpa, Anna. Bydgoska mowa w krakowskich uszach (2001). Rocznik Humanistyczny, 6, 195–203.
- Sawaniewska-Mochowa Z. Bydgoska mowa w kresowych uszach (2005).
- Sulima‑Kamiński, Jerzy (1986–1988). Most Królowej Jadwigi (literary source).
- Raszewski, Zbigniew. Pamiętnik gapia. Bydgoszcz, jaką pamiętam (literary source).
- Nowakowski, Tadeusz. Obóz wszystkich świętych (literary source).
- Rogowski, Wiesław. Kamienny bruk (literary source).
- Biedowicz, Janina. Gimnazjalistki z Kujawskiej (literary source).
