= Bromberg (disambiguation) =

Bromberg, or Bydgoszcz, is a city in Poland.

Bromberg may also refer to:

- Bromberg (region), a former administrative region of Prussia
  - Kreis Bromberg, a former district of the Bromberg administrative region
- Bromberg, Lower Austria, a town in Austria
- Bromberg (Schönbuch), a hill in Baden-Württemberg, Germany
- Bromberg (surname), a list of people with the name
- Bromberg's, a jewelry and gift retailer in Birmingham, Alabama, US
- Treaty of Bromberg, treaty between John II Casimir of Poland and Elector Frederick William of Brandenburg-Prussia

== See also ==
- Nazi concentration camps near Bydgoszcz, Poland
  - Bromberg-Ost
  - Bromberg-Brahnau
- Bromberger (disambiguation)
