= Kuyavian Borowiaks =

Borowiacy Kujawscy (Polish)

Regions with significant populations
- Poland (Greater Poland Voivodeship)

Languages
- Polish (Greater Poland dialect, Kuyavian subdialect)

Religion
- Roman Catholicism

Related ethnic groups
- Poles, Greater Poland people

Kuyavian Borowiaks (Note: Polish: Borowiacy Kujawscy, Borowiaki kujawscy, borowioki kujowskie) is an ethnic subgroup of Kuyavians, who themselves are an ethnographic group of Polish people. They originate from the forest area of southern Kuyavia, located between the towns of Brdów, Przedecz, and Sompolno, within the counties of Koło and Konin, within the Greater Poland Voivodeship, Poland. They speak the Kuyavian subdialect of the Greater Poland dialect of Polish language. The group itself has inflected by nearby groups of Kashubians and Greater Poland people.
