= Bomberger =

Bomberger is a surname

- Dorothy Ellinore Lucas (née Bomberger), George Lucas's mother
- John Henry Augustus Bomberger, German Reformed clergyman
- Kathryne Bomberger, International Commission on Missing Persons director general
- Susan Cox (née Bomberger), Union nurse during the American Civil War

== See also ==
- Bomberg
- Bromberg (surname)
- Bomberger's Distillery, Newmanstown, Pennsylvania, USA
