= Dromberg =

Dromberg is a surname. Notable people with the surname include:

- Donnar Dromberg (1908–1992), Finnish philatelist
- Kaarina Dromberg (born 1942), Finnish politician

== See also ==
- Bromberg (surname)
