= Bomberg =

Bomberg is a surname, borne, among others by

- Daniel Bomberg (Dutch: Daniel van Bomberghen; ?, Antwerp – 1549), printer of the Talmud
- David Garshen Bomberg (1890–1957), English painter of Polish Jewish origin
  - David Bomberg House, a hall of residence for London South Bank University students

== See also ==
- Bomberger
- Bromberg (surname)
