= Western Greater Poland dialect =

Polish dialect of Western Poland

Western Greater Polish dialect
- Native to: Poland
- Region: Western Greater Poland
- Language family: Indo-European: Balto-Slavic; Slavic; West Slavic; Lechitic; Polish; Greater Polish; Western Greater Polish dialect

Language codes
- ISO 639-3: –

The Western Greater Polish dialect (Polish: gwary zachodniowielkopolskie) belongs to the Greater Poland dialect group and is located in the western part of Poland. It borders the new mixed dialects to the west, the Northern Greater Polish dialect to the far northeast, the Central Greater Polish dialect to the east, and the Southern Greater Polish dialect to the far southeast.

== Phonology ==
Typical of Greater Polish dialects, voicing of word-final consonants before vowels and liquids is present in all the region. Also typical of Greater Polish dialects, mazuration is not present, except in Wieleń, where the so-called “Wieleń Masurs” are, who have mazuration. In reality, they are not true Masurians, but are just called this due to their dialect.

=== Vowels ===
Common here, as to many other dialects of Greater Polish, is diphthongization of monophthongs, e.g. /ɔ/ > /wɛ/. There is a strong tendency here to add -j after final -y, as in much of Greater Poland. Often -ył, -ił shift to -uł. Final -ej frequently shift to i (after soft consonants)/y (after hard consonants): liepi (lepiej).

==== Slanted vowels ====
Slanted á raises to o, slanted ó raises to u (as in Standard Polish), and there are a few cases where standard o raises ó. Slanted é raises to y after hard consonants and to i after soft consonants.

==== Nasal vowels ====
Medial ą and ę decompose except before sibilants (as in Standard Polish). ą decomposes to óN ę decomposes to yN after hard consonants and iN after soft. Word final -ą decomposes to -om, -óm and word final -ę denasalizes to -e. Common here is the diphthongization of nasal vowels, especially final -ą to -óᵐ, or the decomposition of nasal vowels, as in Standard Polish. Liquids, especially nasals, frequently cause raising, so oN to óN and eN to yN after hard consonants and to iN after soft.

==== Prothesis ====
Labizalization of o to ô both initially and sometimes medially can be found here.

=== Consonants ===
Often ł is intervocalically, or sometimes ło, resulting in forms such as bya (była), or kowrotek (kołowortek). Reduction of doubled consonants is present: leki (lekki). l is sometimes softer: liekarz (lekarz). The group -stn- reduces to -sn-. kt- shifts to cht-, and chrz shifts to krz-.

== Inflection ==
A few changes to Standard Polish infection can be see.

=== Nouns ===
Gerunds formed with -enie take -u for the genitive instead of -a, z wejrzyniu (z wejrzenia).

=== Adjectives, adverbs, pronouns, and numerals ===
The comparative of adverbs is often -y due to sound changes.

=== Verbs ===
Past tense forms can be -uł as a result of sound changes: bułoᵉ (było).

== Vocabulary ==
Most of the vocabulary is typical for a Greater Polish dialect. Some of the vocabulary has been influenced by the Sorbian languages, as this was an old point of contact between the two lects.

=== Word-Formation ===
Western Greater Polish shows features typical of other Greater Polish dialects.

==== Nouns ====
-yszek is the common diminuative noun forming suffix. Nominalization of adjectives is common here, listowy (instead of listonosz, ‘mailman’) and listowo (wife of a mailman).

==== Adjectives, adverbs, pronouns, and numerals ====
A common way to form diminutive adjectives is with -itki. -yty/-ity are often used where -ysty/-ity might occur in Standard Polish.

==== Verbs ====
Verbs are sometimes prefixed with o- (ô-) where in Standard Polish is often wy-.

== See also ==
- Dialects of the Polish language
- Languages of Europe
- Polish language
