= Bromberger =

Bromberger may refer to:

Related to Bydgoszcz (Bromberg), a city in Poland:

- Bloody Sunday (1939) (Bromberger Blutsonntag), a 1939 massacre in Nazi German-occupied Poland
- Bydgoszcz Canal (Bromberger Kanal), between the cities of Bydgoszcz and Nakło in Poland
- Bydgoszcz dialect, urban dialect (Gwara bydgoska, Bromberger Dialekt)

== People ==
- Christian Bromberger (born 1946), French professor of anthropology
- Dora Bromberger (1881–1942), German artist
- Dominique Bromberger (born 1944), French journalist and 2004 winner of the Prix Vérité
- Josef Bromberger (1903–1951), Hungarian-born American character actor
- Hervé Bromberger (1918–1993), French film director and screenwriter
- Merry Bromberger (1906-1978), French writer and journalist
- Serge Bromberger (1912-1986), French writer, Le Figaro editor, and 1949 winner of the Albert Londres Prize
- Stefan Bromberger (born 1982), German chess grandmaster
- Ute Bromberger (1937–2004), German journalist and screenwriter
- Willi Bromberger (1927–2004), German athlete; see 1954 World Student Games
