= Central Greater Poland dialect =

Dialect of Polish spoken in Poland

- Native to: Poland
- Region: Central Greater Poland
- Language family: Indo-European: Balto-Slavic; Slavic; West Slavic; Lechitic; Polish; Greater Polish; Central Greater Poland dialect

Language codes
- ISO 639-3: –

The Central Greater Poland dialect (Polish: gwary środkowowielkopolskie) belongs to the Greater Poland dialect group and is located in the part of Poland. It borders the Northern Greater Poland dialect to the north, the Western Greater Poland dialect to the west, the Eastern Greater Poland dialect to the east, the Southern Greater Poland dialect to the south, and the Lesser Polish Sieradz dialect to the southeast. The subdialect of these villages is increasingly affected by Standard Polish, as demonstrated by the number of similar features.

== Phonology ==
Typical of Greater Polish dialects, voicing of word-final consonants before vowels and liquids is present here. Also typical of Greater Polish dialects, mazuration is also not present.

=== Vowels ===
Final -ej is sometimes realized as -ij/-yj or -i/-y, and -aj as -ej. Like many Greater Polish dialects, monophthongs were often diphthongized: myjszyj (myszy), however, this is now rare. A few words show a vowel shift of -eł- > -oł-: widołki (widełki), and some words do not see an ablauted e: mietła (miotła).

==== Slanted vowels ====
Slanted é often raises to i (after both hard and soft consonants) and to y (particularly after hard consonants). Slanted ó is retained ó. Slanted á raises to o.

==== Nasal vowels ====
Nasal ę and ą decompose word-medially to -iN-, -yN- and -oN-, -óN-. Word final -ę denasalizes to -e, and word-final -ą is typically realized as -om, -óm.

==== Prothesis ====
Word-initial o- often labializes to ô-.

=== Consonants ===
Many simplifications of clusters are present: tero (teraz), jes (jest), wszysko (wszystko). Often ł is lost when next to u: pótory (półtory) or intervocalically: byoᵉ (było). A common shift of trz, drz>czsz, dżż>cz, dż, strz, zdrz>szczsz, żdżż>szcz, żdż is present. ch in some positions, especially weak positions, can be realized as k: skła (schła). Doubled consonants are simplified into a single one.

=== Contraction ===
Non-contracted forms can be found: stojały (stały).

== Inflection ==
The inflectional tendencies of this dialect are typical of other Greater Polish dialects.

=== Nouns ===
A few nouns differ in gender from Standard Polish. Mobile e is sometimes not lost in declensions in certain declensions: myndele (myndle). -ów is usually used as the genitive plural ending, regardless of gender. The instrumental plural ending -mi is often levelled to -ami: końmi (koniami).

=== Adjectives, adverbs, pronouns, and numerals ===
The feminine genitive/locative singular and comparative of adverbs may be -y/- instead of -ej as a result of sound changes.

=== Verbs ===
The second person singular imperative may be -ej instead of -aj as a result of sound changes. -ił/-ył of past tense endings shift to -uł. The past tense is sometimes formed without the personal clitics: my musieli (musieliśmy).

=== Prepositions and prefixes ===
The prepositions w and z are extended to we and ze if the following word begins with w or z.

== Vocabulary ==
=== Word-Formation ===
The word formation process of this dialect are typical of Greater Polish dialects.

==== Nouns ====
Common noun-forming suffixes include: -acz/-aczka, -ak/-ok, -arka, -arnia, -arz, -aty/-yty, -ec, -ek, -ik/-yk, -ica, -icha, -isko/-ysko, -nik, -ówka, and -ówa.

==== Adjectives, adverbs, pronouns, and numerals ====
Some adjectives are formed with -anny instead of standard -any. In Łowęcin particularly, some numeral prefixes are used without an interfix/in non-declined forms: cztyryskibowy (czteroskibowy), pińćskibowy (pięcioskibowy).

== See also ==
- Dialects of the Polish language
- Languages of Europe
- Polish language
