= Sieradz dialect =

Dialect of Polish spoken in Poland

- Native to: Poland
- Region: Sieradz
- Ethnicity: Sieradzans
- Language family: Indo-European: Balto-Slavic; Slavic; West Slavic; Lechitic; Polish; Lesser Polish; Sieradz dialect

Language codes
- ISO 639-3: –

The Sieradz dialect (Polish: gwara sieradzka) belongs to the Lesser Poland dialect group and is spoken in Sieradz Land, Poland. It borders the Łęczyca dialect to the north, the Krakow dialect to the south, the Łęczyca dialect to the east, the Central Greater Polish dialect to the northeast, and the Eastern Greater Polish dialect to the farn northeast. The classification of the Łęczyca and Sieradz subdialects is often debated; some classify them as Lesser Polish, whereas others classify them as belonging to Greater Polish. Łęczyca and Sieradz have even been considered as one group due to the large number of similarities. This unclear categorization is the result of the land being placed under control of various administrative territories throughout history, resulting in a transitional dialect between Greater Polish, Lesser Polish, and Masovian. Furthermore, many dialectal traits of the region are fading, and Standard Polish is becoming more prevalent.

== Phonology ==
Tautosyllabic -aj often shifts to -ej, and tautosyllabic -ił/-ył can shift to -uł.

=== Vowels ===
Somewhat exceptional here is the reduction of -ę, -ę > -i word-finally: właścicieli||właściciele (właściciele). Word-final -ej shifts to -ij (after soft consonants)/-yj (after hard consonants or rarely after soft consonants). Initial ra- can shift re- in a small number of words.

==== Slanted vowels ====
Slanted é often raises to i (after soft consonants) or y (after hard consonants or on occasion after soft consonants or in Folwarki also to y). Slanted ó is retained ó/u. Slanted á raises to o, especially in some suffixes, or can be pronounced as a as in Standard Polish. This raising is also inconsistent, and pronunciation typically matches Standard Polish.

==== Nasal vowels ====
e raises to i (after soft consonants) or y (after hard consonants or on occasion after soft consonants) before nasals, and o can raise to ó/u before nasals as well. Such raising before other liquids is rare here, except sometimes e before r. Similarly, medial -ę-, -ą- also raise and decompose to iN, yN and óN except before sibilants. Word final -ę denasalizes to -e and -ą decomposes to -óm.

==== Prothesis ====
Initial o- can sometimes labialize to ô-, especially common for older speakers.

=== Consonants ===
Simplification of clusters can occur, such as k, g, t, d, r + l, ł in verb forms: móg (mógł). Doubled consonants can undergo dissimilation: drożcze (droższe). Furthermore, trz > cz, drz > dż, strz > szcz, and -ść, -źć > -ś, -ź. Often intervocalic ł is lost: miaam (miałam). ch in consonant clusters can shift to k, and conversely k in some clusters can shift to ch. A feature tying Sieradz with Lesser Polish is the shift of final -ch > -k. Soft labials can weaken.

=== Contraction ===
Typically contraction occurs here, but rare uncontracted forms can are attested: stojały (stały).

== Inflection ==
=== Nouns ===
There is a preference for -a for masculine nouns in the genitive singular instead of -u for all nouns. Somewhat more common here than in Standard Polish is the use of the partitive genitive: zapolyli papiyrosów (zapalili papierosów). There is a tendency to use -ów as the genitive plural ending for all nouns, regardless of gender.

=== Adjectives, adverbs, pronouns, and numerals ===
The feminine genitive/locative singular of adjectives, pronouns, and numerals and the comparative of adverbs may e -ij/-yj or less commonly -i/-y due to sound changes.

=== Verbs ===
The imperative of verbs may be -ej instead of -aj due to sound changes, and similarly, the masculine singular past tense may be -uł due to sound changes. The feminine past tense may be appear as -aa- due to sound changes. Archaically the past tense in the first person plural can be formed with jeśmy or -m or -my alongside -śmy (sometimes pronounced -źmy). Also it can be formed with a personal pronoun and the l-form of a verb without a personal clitic: my mówili. Also found here is the use of a personal pronoun + że + personal clitic + l-form of the verb. Ablaut in verb forms is often levelled: niesły (niosły). The second person plural imperative can be formed with -ta.

=== Prepositions and prefixes ===
Common is the extension of the prepositions w, z with mobile e to we, ze when before a word starting with a consonant of the same place of articulation.

== Vocabulary ==
=== Word-Formation ===
Both Lesser Polish and Masovian tendencies can be seen in the word-formation.

==== Nouns ====
Nouns denoting young animals and people are formed with -ak, as in Masovian dialects.

==== Verbs ====
Verbs are often formed with -ić, and frequentatives with -ywać.

== Syntax ==
Masculine personal nouns are often levelled with masculine animal nouns, but other words in the sentence take masculine personal agreement: rzeżniki chodzili.

== See also ==
- Dialects of the Polish language
- Languages of Europe
- Polish language
