= Łęczyca dialect =

Dialect of Polish spoken in Poland

- Native to: Poland
- Region: Łęczyca
- Ethnicity: Łęczycans
- Language family: Indo-European: Balto-Slavic; Slavic; West Slavic; Lechitic; Polish; Lesser Polish; Łęczyca dialect

Language codes
- ISO 639-3: –

The Łęczyca dialect (Polish: gwara łęczycka) belongs to the Lesser Poland dialect group and is spoken in Łęczyca Land, Poland. It borders the Sieradz dialect to the southeast, the Kielce dialect to the southwest, the Masovian Borderland dialect to the east, the Eastern Greater Polish dialect to the northeast, and the Kujawy dialect to the far northeast. Łęczyca, along with Sieradz, occupy central Poland, which greatly affects them. The classification of the Łęczyca and Sieradz subdialects is often debated; some have classified them as Lesser Polish, whereas others as belonging to Greater Polish. Łęczyca and Sieradz have even been considered as one group due to the large number of similarities by Eugeniusz Pawłowski and others. This unclear categorization is the result of the land being placed under control of various administrative territories throughout history, resulting in a transitional dialect between Greater Polish, Lesser Polish, and Masovian. Furthermore, many dialectal traits of the region are fading, and Standard Polish is becoming more prevalent.

== Phonology ==
Typical of Lesser Polish dialects (as well as Greater Polish dialects), voicing of word-final consonants before vowels and liquids is present here. Here, the personal verb clitic -śmy are also rarely affected, such that byliśmy may be realized as byliźmy. Also typical of Lesser Polish dialects is the presence of mazurzenie, however, most modern speakers do not have this. Speakers apply masuration asynchronically; that is they also apply it to /ʐ/ resulting from rz, which is unetymological, as rz merged with ż after mazurzenie, leaving any new /ʐ/ unchanged. Siakanie frequently occurs here, especially when sz, ż, cz occur before a soft consonant, however siakanie is not restricted to this position.

=== Vowels ===
The clusters ir, yr have generally lowered to er, as in Standard Polish, but original ir, yr can still be heard. Word-final -ej shifts to -ij (after soft consonants)/-yj (after hard consonants or rarely after soft consonants) and rarely further to -i/-y. Tautosyllabic -aj may shift to -ej. A shift of ra- > re- common of northern Polish dialects is found only in a few fossiliziations in Łęczyca now. More commonly a lack of an ablaut in verb forms can be found, usually as the result of analogy: bierom (biorą), przyniesły (przyniosły). This can be found in noun forms, but rarely. This trait also ties Łęczyca with Greater Poland and Lesser Poland.

==== Slanted vowels ====
Slanted é often raises to i (after soft consonants) or y (after hard consonants or on occasion after soft consonants), or is e, as in Standard Polish. Slanted ó is retained as ó/u. Slanted á raises to o, especially in some suffixes, or is realized as a, as in Standard Polish.

==== Nasal vowels ====
Nasal ę word-medially raises to y̨ after hard consonants and to į after soft consonants, where it is further decomposed to yN and iN before non sibilants, or can be realized as in Standard Polish (ę before sibilants, eN before non-sibilants). Word-finally it denazalizes to -e. Before l, ł, raising may occur and then denasalization, resulting in forms such as wyjyłam (wyjęłam). Nasal ą word-medially can rarely be realized as ų before sibilants, or more commonly as in Standard Polish (oN before non-sibilants or somewhat commonly before sibilants, otherwise ǫ before sibilants). Word-finally it can most commonly decompose to -om, be realized as in standard Polish, or rarely, on the border with Masovia, denazalize to -o. Before l, ł, raising may occur and then denasalization, resulting in forms such as rąbnuł (rąbął) Forms such as rąbnył can be explained via analogy to forms such as rąbnyła. Raising before liquids, especially nasals, and less often before r, l, ł, is present as well, but also becoming uncommon: eN > yN, aN > oN, and sometimes oN > uN, and somewhat more commonly or > ur.

==== Prothesis ====
Labialization of initial o and ó (from prenasal raising) to ô is rare here, but may be more common in certain regions such as Dobrów. Labialization is a feature that connects Dobrów more with Greater Poland and Lesser Poland than with Masovia. Rarer still is word-medial labialization after velar consonants.

=== Consonants ===
Intervocalic voicing also occurs in some words: poledziało (poleciało). Many consonant clusters are simplified here, typically by removing a liquid between two other consonants: garka (garnka), or sometimes a liquid before another consonant in common words: tyko (tylko), or sometimes ł intervocalically: śpiywaam (śpiywałam). The group -ndn- (resulting from a decomposition of nasal vowels) simplifies to -nn-: porzonnie (porządnie). The rare cluster –rwsz- is simplified to -rsz-: piyrszy (pierwszy), and the simplification of wszystko > wszysko. Verbs ending with -ść and -źć simplify to -ś, -ź, and verb forms ending in a consonant + ł lose the final ł: przyszed (przyszedł). Often initial ch plus a consonant changes to k: krzciny (chrzciny), and the group kt changes to cht, and tk to tch: zatchane (zatkane). Sometimes the opposite can occur in verbs ending with -nąć that do not take -ną- -nę- in the past tense: wypkła (wypchnęła). Some Masovian traits may be seen regionally: decomposition of soft labials may occur (found with a single speaker in Tum), simplification of clusters resulting from this decomposition: cojek (człowiek), pojado (powiada) (found in Tum and Dobrów), św’, ćw’, dźw’ may be realized as św, ćw, dźw (found with a single speaker in Tum as well as many speakers in Dobrów), and a hardening of -mi, especially in instrumental plural endings and the dative singular of ja (found ni Tum); hardening of soft ḱ: occasional hardening of li > ly, usually the result of raising pochylone e: mlykim (mlekiem). These features are rare, and generally are realized in accordance with Standard Polish.

=== Contraction ===
Typically contraction occurs here, but rare uncontracted forms can are attested: stojały (stały).

== Inflection ==
=== Nouns ===
Many soft neuter nouns (those ending with -e) have replaced the final vowel with -o: powietrzo (powietrze). Some neuter nouns ending with -ę have some declensions levelled: z imiym (z imieniem). There is a tendency to use -ów as the genitive plural ending for all nouns, regardless of gender.

=== Adjectives, adverbs, pronouns, and numerals ===
The feminine genitive/locative singular of adjectives, pronouns, and numerals and the comparative of adverbs may e -ij/-yj or less commonly -i/-y due to sound changes.

=== Verbs ===
The imperative of verbs may be -ej instead of -aj due to sound changes. In Tum, the first person plural past tense verb ending -m can rarely be found instead of -śmy. -śmy is much more common in Dobrów alongside -źmy. Similarly, and often preferred for dialectal stylization, is the ending -śta, -ta, extracted from the old dual; used for the past tense in Tum and occasionally for the imperative in Dobrów. The Standard Polish ending -cie is generally preferred over this ending. Sometimes an analytical past tense can be formed with że plus a personal clitic (-m, -śmy) and the l-form of the verb. This often occurs alongside standard endings. Due to Masovian influence, verbs that commonly end in -eć may end in -ić.

=== Prepositions and prefixes ===
Common is the extension of the prepositions w, z with mobile e to we, ze when before a word starting with a consonant of the same place of articulation: we wojne, ze synkatym.

== Syntax ==
Sometimes masculine inanimate nouns are declined as masculine animal nouns. Similarly there is a tendency to level masculine personal and masculine animate nouns, where masculine personal nouns are declined as masculine animal nouns but other words in the concordance take masculine personal endings, such as verb endings. As a result, deprecative don't have a negative connotation. Use of deprecative forms neutrally is now rare, however.

== See also ==
- Dialects of the Polish language
- Languages of Europe
- Polish language
