= Łęczycans =

Ethnographic group of Polish people

Łęczycanie (Polish)
- The historical coat of arms of the Łęczyca Voivodeship.

Regions with significant populations
- Poland (Łódź Voivodeship)

Languages
- Łęczycan (Polish)

Religion
- Roman Catholicism

Related ethnic groups
- Other Poles, especially Lesser Poland people

Łęczycans (Note: Polish: Łęczycanie) is an ethnographic group of Polish people that originates from the historical region of Łęczyca Land, located within the borders of the Łódź Voivodeship, Poland. The group currently does not express much cultural separateness from other Poles. Historically, the group has been heavily inflected by the neighboring groups of Masovians, Greater Poland people, and Lesser Poland people.
