= Kuyavians =

Kujawiacy
Kujawiacy (Polish)
- The historical coat of arms of Kuyavia

Regions with significant populations
- Poland (Greater Poland Voivodeship, Kuyavian-Pomeranian Voivodeship)

Languages
- Polish (Greater Poland dialect, Kuyavian dialect)

Religion
- Roman Catholicism

Related ethnic groups
- Greater Poland people, Kocievians, Kashubians

The Kuyavians (Note: Polish: Kujawiacy, Kujawianie; Kuyavian: Kujawiocy, Kujawusy) are an ethnographic group of Polish people, originating from the region of Kuyavia, located within the Kuyavian-Pomeranian Voivodeship and eastern Greater Poland Voivodeship in Poland. They speak the Kuyavian subdialect of the Greater Poland dialect cluster of Polish language. The group itself been influenced by nearby groups of Pomeranians and Greater Poland people.
