= Southern Greater Poland dialect =

Dialect of Polish spoken in Poland

- Native to: Poland
- Region: Southern Greater Poland
- Language family: Indo-European: Balto-Slavic; Slavic; West Slavic; Lechitic; Polish; Greater Polish; Southern Greater Poland dialect

Language codes
- ISO 639-3: –

The Southern Greater Poland dialect (Polish: gwary południowowielkopolskie) belongs to the Greater Poland dialect group and is located in the part of Poland. It borders the Northern Greater Poland dialect to the north, the Eastern Greater Poland dialect to the northeast, and the new mixed dialects to the south.

== Phonology ==
As in other Greater Polish dialects, voicing of word-final consonants before vowels and liquids is present here. Also typical of Greater Polish dialects, mazuration is not present.

=== Vowels ===
-y often diphthongizes to -yj, as in many Greater Polish subdialects, typically word-finally in the south but sometimes also word-medially in the west. A few instances of i after a soft consonant have shifted to y (and softness is retained): we chliywie; kuknyliy; mówiliy. Final -aj shifts to -ej.

==== Slanted vowels ====
Slanted é raises to y. Slanted ó raises to u. Slanted á raises to o.

==== Nasal vowels ====
Regionally, Word-medial -ę- denasalizes and raises: czyść (część). ę word-finally denasalizes to -e, and word-medially as well, except when before a sibilant, where some nasality is retained: bede (będę), but czyⁿś (część). ą word-finally is typically realized as -om, -óm. Nasal consonants can cause raising of e to generally y, but sometimes o or i. The ending -nąć and its inflections can shift to -nóć or sometimes -nóńć.

==== Prothesis ====
o labializes to ô not only word-initially, but also sometimes word-medially or word-finally.

=== Consonants ===
n, d, t can palatalize when near e, i, y (notably after these vowels, when typically they need to be before them): malinia (malina), but palatalization after y is rare: pierzynia||pierzyna.. ł is often lost, especially intervocalically: syszaam (słyszałam). kt shifts to cht. trz is simplified to cz. Some consonants assimilate in softness: dźwi (drzwi); przyjśli (przyszli). Sometimes j is inserted before palatal consonants: zajś (zaś). Final m is sporadically lost: poty (potem).

=== Contraction ===
Many uncontracted forms are retained, usually amongst older speakers: grajesz (grasz).

== Inflection ==
Southern Greater Polish has many features common to other Greater Polish dialects.

=== Nouns ===
Nouns retain -ewi as the masculine dative singular of soft-stem nouns: koniewi (koniowi).

=== Adjectives, adverbs, pronouns, and numerals ===
Soft-stem adjectives are often formed with -ewy: majewy (majowy).

=== Verbs ===
The past tense of verbs can appear without -ł- due to sound changes. -ty is used in place of other passive participle endings: zmołty (zmielony). As a result of sound changes, the imperative is usually formed with -ej instead of -aj. Older speakers also sometimes use żym in past tense constructions. The first person plural verb ending -ma is found, but is rare.

== Vocabulary ==
=== Word-Formation ===
This dialect has word-formation process common to Greater Polish dialects generally.

==== Nouns ====
-cha is a common augmentative suffix.

==== Adjectives, adverbs, pronouns, and numerals ====
-y and -ki are productive adjectival endings: dłużyki (długi). -iśki and -itki are common adjective diminutive endings.

== See also ==
- Dialects of the Polish language
- Languages of Europe
- Polish language
