= Susan Cox (nurse) =

Union nurse during the American Civil War (c. 1827 – 1901)

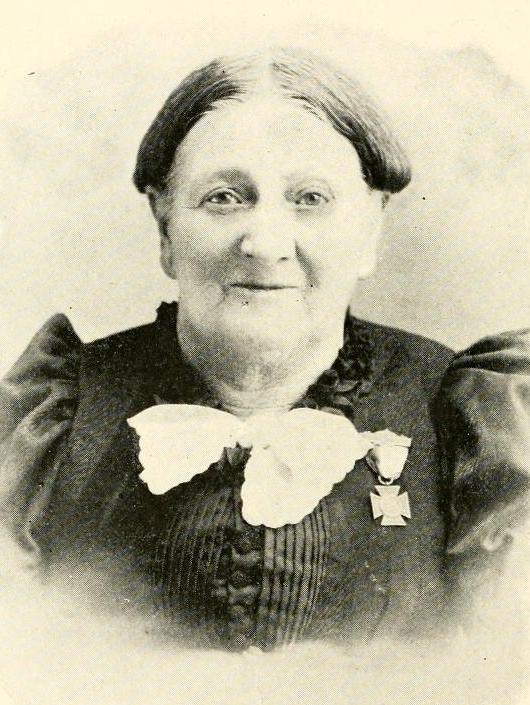
- Susan Cox, from an 1897 publication
- Born: January 1, 1827; Hagerstown, Maryland, U.S.
- Died: October 12, 1901 (aged 74); Tecumseh, Nebraska, U.S.
- Occupation: Civil War Nurse
- Years active: 1862–1864
- Spouse: Isaac Cox
- Children: 15

Susan Cox (née Bomberger; c. 1827 – 1901) served as a Union nurse during the American Civil War.

== Early life ==
Susan Cox was born in Hagerstown, Maryland, in 1807. She was the second wife of Isaac "Ike" Cox, a Canadian-American blacksmith, whom she married in 1847 in West Jefferson, Ohio. Her husband served as a member of the 83rd Illinois Infantry during the Civil War. In 1867, Cox and her husband moved to a farm in Johnson County, Nebraska. She had 12 children with him, and became mother to the three children he had from a previous marriage. Only four of her children survived to adulthood. She and her husband were Baptists.

== Participation in the Civil War effort ==
Cox enlisted in October 1862, in Knox County, Illinois. She served with her husband in the 83rd Illinois Infantry Nurse Corps throughout her career as a Civil War Nurse, serving at Fort Henry, Fort Donelson, and Clarksville. Because Cox remained with the same regiment, and spent much of her time with them at Fort Donelson, her experiences were not as varied as the stories of some Civil War nurses. Civil War nurses did much more than change bandages, tend wounds, and dispense medicine. They also passed out supplies, wrote letters for soldiers and read to them, cooked and served meals, and did laundry.

At Fort Donelson, Cox witnessed daily fight with the enemy. This work exposed Cox to enemy fire and camp life difficulties as she cared for the ailing soldiers. Cox's husband was also part of the infantry; one day, as Cox was following her husband and his company up the Cumberland River, a skirmish broke out. Cox also witnessed a man publicly executed for desertion. After many challenging experiences, Cox's service ended June 1864.

== After the war ==
After the war, Cox stayed at home as a housekeeper, according to an 1880 census. She continued to receive pension for her services in the war. Familiarly known as "Grandma Cox", Susan Cox and her husband lived in Tecumseh, Nebraska, for twenty years until her death in 1901. Her funeral was held in her local Baptist Church and the service was conducted by Rev. T.D. Davis.
