= Donnar Dromberg =

Finnish philatelist (1908–1992)

Donnar A. Dromberg (22 September 1908 – 27 June 1992) was a Finnish philatelist who was added to the Roll of Distinguished Philatelists in 1977. He was an expert in the philately of South America.

Dromberg was the special representative for Finland for the Royal Philatelic Society London.

== Selected publications ==
- Via Gothenberg. Finnish Philatelic Federation.
