= Tuchola Forest dialect =

Dialect of Polish spoken in Poland

- Native to: Poland
- Region: Tuchola
- Language family: Indo-European: Balto-Slavic; Slavic; West Slavic; Lechitic; Polish; Greater Polish; Tuchola Forest dialect

Language codes
- ISO 639-3: –

The Tuchola Forest dialect (Polish: gwara Borów Tucholskich) belongs to the Greater Poland dialect group and is located in the northern part of Poland. It borders the Krajna dialect to the south, the Chełmno-Dobrzyń dialect to the southeast, the Kociewie dialect to the east, and the Kashubian language to the north.

Once called the Tuchola dialect by Nitsch, now Bory is more common, as it is more general and does not refer to just the city. It is a transitional dialect with Kashubian. The line between Bory and Krajna is not clear. Bory does not have any features that are not shared by neighboring dialects, and as such, it has been stated that it's not a dialectal unit the same as others, but rather a transitionary dialect between many others.

== Phonology ==
Atypical of other Greater Polish subdialects, there is a preference for devoicing consonants at the ends of words when before a vowel or liquid. Typical of Greater Polish dialects, there is an absence of mazuration.

=== Vowels ===
The Bory Tucholskie dialect has a vowel system typical of other Greater Polish dialects.

y is often pronounced as a non-softening i, phonetically as [ɪ], phonemically having merged with i.

==== Slanted vowels ====
Slanted á can still be heard but is rare, and has nearly entirely merged with o, or rarely may be pronounced as diphthongs, /ou/ or /au/. Similarly, slanted é can sometimes be retained as é, but is generally merges with y. Slanted ó is generally preserved as ó.

==== Nasal vowels ====
Typically medial ę is lowered, giving aN, but sometimes ę is preserved and pronounced as in the standard, or also raised to yN, and the raised pronunciation is replacing the lowered pronunciation. Word finally, ę typically lowers and denazalizes, giving a. Parallel to this is the development of eN, which often lowers to aN, less commonly as oN, or yN. Medial ą is typically pronounced the same as in Standard Polish, occasionally being raised to uN, and finally denasalizes, giving o, the group oN is typically pronounced the same as in Standard Polish, but may raise to óN.

=== Consonants ===
There is a tendency to decompose soft labials, so ṕ b́ as pj bj, ḿ as mń. k’ and g’ can harden to k and g: kedyś. In the past these often palatalized to ć and dź, but this is no longer preserved. Conversely, chy may often be softened to chi. ł is usually lost word finally in the active past participle or at the end of a syllable word-medially. Word-final ń is sporadically realized as j.

=== Contraction ===
Non-contracted verb forms are preserved: stojeli (stali).

== Inflection ==
Bory shows influences from both Masovian and Greater Polish dialects.

=== Nouns ===
The instrumental plural ending -ami is often hardened to -amy. Like most other dialects, -ów is often used as the gender-plural ending for all nouns regardless of gender.

=== Prepositions and prefixes ===
Certain prepositions are doubled: ze + z > zez.

== Vocabulary ==
=== Word-Formation ===
Bory shows word-formation features typical of a Greater Polish dialect.

==== Nouns ====
There is a preference for the noun-forming suffix -awa over -ówa (which still occurs often), which is more similar to Krajna than to Kociewie. Diminutives are usually formed with -aszek, –uszek, -iszek // -yszek, and many adjectives are formed with -aty.

== Syntax ==
Bory has also lost the distinction between masculine animal and masculine personal genders, often using personal verb endings for non-personal nouns, and changing masculine personal nouns to have masculine animal-like declension.

== See also ==
- Dialects of the Polish language
- Languages of Europe
- Polish language
