= Stefan Bromberger =

German chess grandmaster (born 1982)

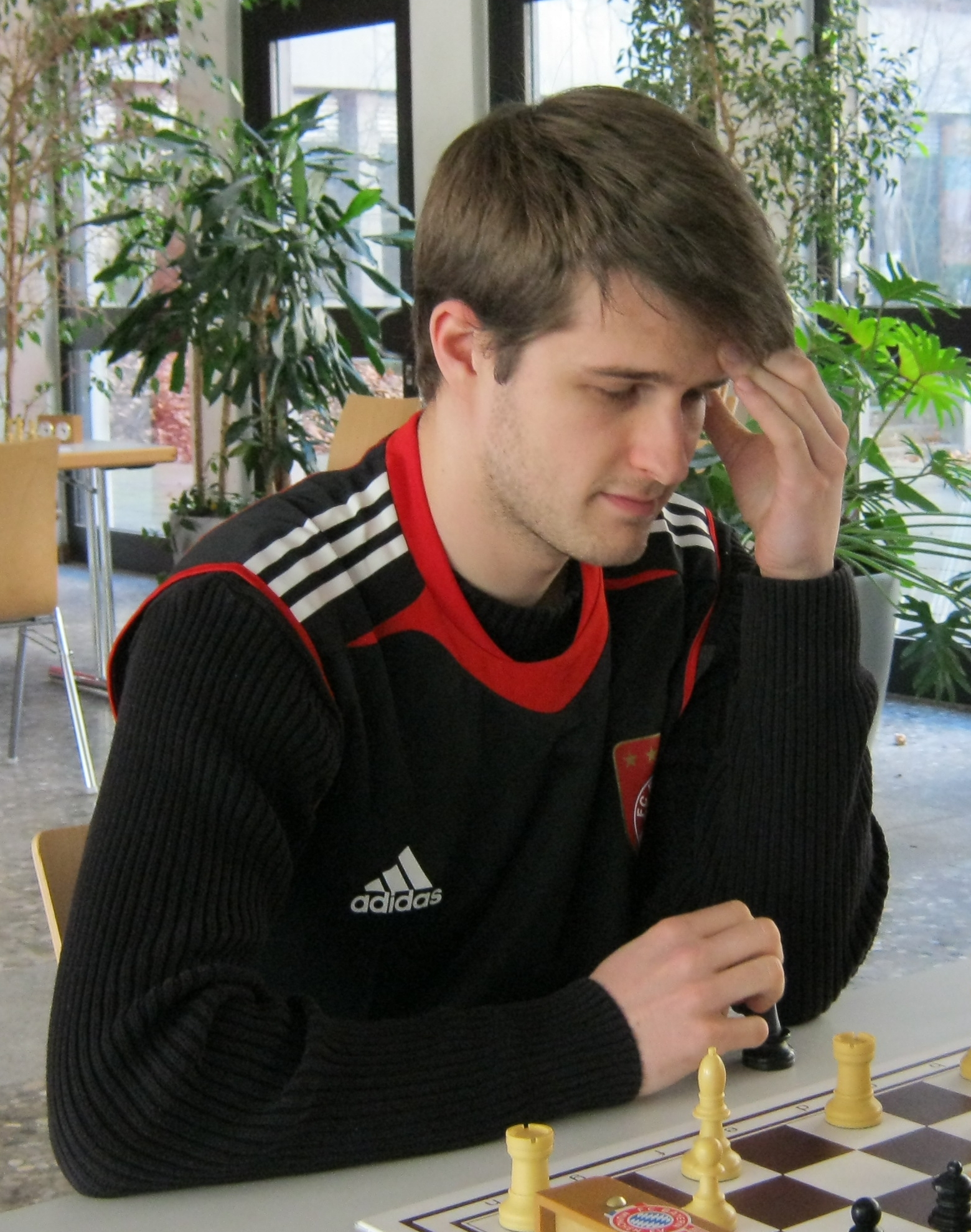

Personal information
- Born: 19 March 1982 (age 44) Neuss, West Germany

Chess career
- Country: Germany
- Title: Grandmaster (2014)
- FIDE rating: 2475 (July 2026)
- Peak rating: 2556 (April 2015)

Stefan Bromberger (born 19 March 1982) is a German chess grandmaster. He received the grandmaster title in 2014.

== Career ==
Bromberger has been active in German team chess for many years. In the German Chess Bundesliga, he played for FC Bayern Munich in the 2010–11 season, and later represented MSA Zugzwang in both the German Chess Bundesliga and the 2nd Bundesliga.

His peak FIDE rating was 2556 in April 2015.
