= Kocievian dialect =

Dialect of Polish spoken in northern Poland

Kociewie dialect
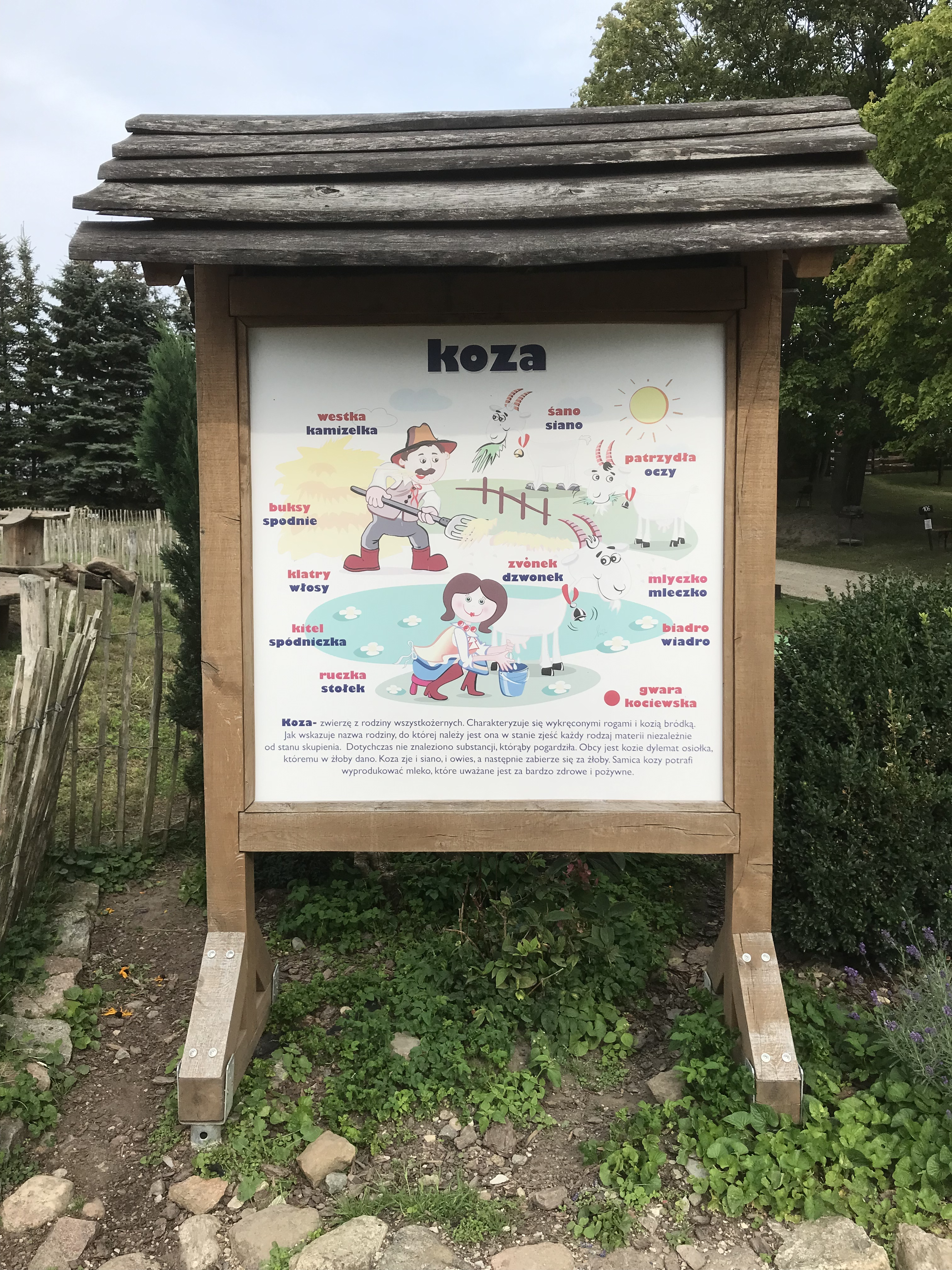
- Information board in Godziszewo displaying words in the Kocievian dialect including zvȯnek (bell), klastry (hair), and kitel (skirt)
- Native to: Poland
- Region: Kociewie
- Ethnicity: Kocievians
- Language family: Indo-European: Balto-Slavic; Slavic; West Slavic; Lechitic; Polish; Greater Polish; Kociewie dialect

Language codes
- ISO 639-3: –
- IETF: pl-kociewie

The Kocievian dialect (Polish: gwara Kociewska) belongs to the Greater Poland dialect group and is located in the northern part of Poland. It borders the Bory Tucholskie dialect to the northwest, the Chełmno-Dobrzyń dialect to the south, the Kashubian language to the north, and the Masovian Lubawa dialect to the northeast. Due to its position, the Kocievian dialect sometimes shares more features with Masovian dialects than with Greater Polish dialects, and is usually considered a transitional dialect, and some Kashubian influence can also be seen.

== Phonology ==
As is typical of Greater Polish dialects, the Kocievian dialect is not subject to mazuration. Atypical of Greater Polish dialects however, is the presence devoicing of word-final consonants before vowels and liquids.

=== Vowels ===
Kociewie displays a vowel system very similar to other Greater Polish dialects, but shows some influence from Masovian dialects. Atypical of other Greater Polish dialects, diphthongisation of monophthongs is not present. i, y, u often lower before liquids: fortki (furtki).

Masovian influence on the vowel system can also be seen. Medial -ar- sometimes shifts to -er-, but this has become less common in recent times.

Features found in many northern lects are also present. y phonemically merges with i but phonetically approaches [ɪ], leaving the softness of the previous consonant as the main phonemic factor.

==== Slanted vowels ====
It is possible that Kociewie originally changed slanted a to o, like many Greater Polish dialects, but resubstituted them with "a" under Masovian influence, which maintains a clear distinction between a and á, and á could be heard as a. Slanted é shifts to y or i normally, and slanted ó is maintained, like in other Greater Poland dialects.

==== Nasal vowels ====
Kociewie can be divided into three regions depending on how it treats nasal vowels.

In the south nasality can be preserved before sibilants with the reflexes being a for ę and u for o; ‘’ganś, ksiunżka’’.

In central Kociewie with ę can go to a and ą to ó, but with the loss of nasality of nasal vowels before sibilants: gasi.

In northern Kociewie nasality is also lost before sibilants, but ę goes to y, or sometimes lowers to a.

Nasal vowels lose their nasality and decompose in front of consonants, so ą becomes ó pochylone + n, ń, or m, and becomes o word finally. ę also denasalizes word finally and becomes e or sometimes a, resulting in the fact that feminine nouns in the accusative and nominative sound the same. Before a consonant or word-internally ę decomposed to y + n, ń, or m.

The cluster oN shows prenasal raising, giving óN.

=== Consonants ===
w is often pronounced voiced even after voiceless consonants, as in other Greater Polish dialects.

There are numerous Masovian influences on the consonant system. The groups św’, ćw’, dźw’ often harden: śwecili (świecili). Often the group li hardens to ly due to Masovian influence. The cluster chy often softens to chi, and kie, gie often harden to ke, ge. Soft labials often decompose, where the palatal element strengthens to j, now less common.

kt shifts cht: chtoś (ktoś).

== Inflection ==
Kociewie has some changes common to northern lects, as well as some innovations in its inflection.

=== Nouns ===
Masovian dialects have also greatly influenced the declension. The instrumental plural ending -ami oftens hardens to -amy. The masculine dative singular may be formed with -owiu, which has been less common in recent times. The genitive plural ending -ów is often used for all nouns regardless of gender.

=== Adjectives, adverbs, pronouns, and numerals ===
Adjectives, numerals, and pronouns frequently take -ę, which may be realized as a, instead of -ą for the feminine accusative singular, as in nominal declensions.

=== Verbs ===
The ending -ma is sometimes used for verbs in the first person plural imperative, common to Greater Polish: róbma (róbmy). However, the first person plural past and sometimes present may also more frequently be formed with -m, common to northern lect generally: wyślim (wyszliśmy), przyjdziem (przyjdziemy).

The second person plural imperative and present tense is formed with -ta: chodźta (chodźcie).

Due to Masovian influence, -ił/-ył shifts to -uł in the past tense of verbs: chodziuł (chodził).

The feminine first person singular past tense is sometimes formed with -óm instead of -am, an innovation unique to the area; this is mostly found in folk songs: skakałóm (skakałam). It was formed as the group eN often lowers to aN, resulting in the masculine and feminine forms merging, and via analogy to present tense forms such as gadóm.

The third person plural past tense often ends in -eli, or sometimes -oli where in Standard Polish it is -ali: śpieweli (śpiewali), loli (lali).

The past tense may also be formed analytically with a personal pronoun, że + a personal clitic, and the verb in the past tense form without a personal clitic: ja żam gadał (gadałem), or more frequently, without the particle: ja gadał (gadałem).

Ablaut and consonant alternation is often levelled in conjugations: ja biere, ja biorze (ja biorę).

== Syntax ==
The form ‘’dwa’’ is sometimes used also for feminine nouns, but is now uncommon. This happens in most of northern lects. Also common to northern lects, the masculine plural is often levlled, wherein masculine plural nouns gain masculine animal endings, but verbs take -li instead of -ł for all genders.

== Vocabulary ==
=== Word-formation ===
Kociewie word-formation is often influenced by neighboring dialects, but also displays some features typical of Greater Polish dialects.

==== Nouns ====
Nouns denoting young animals and people are often formed with -ak due to Masovian influence, rather than -ę.

Other nouns are frequently formed with -or: gapior. Augmentatives may be formed with -ora: babora, or -óń: pijón.

Diminutives are often formed as in other Greater Polish dialects with -uszek/-iszek/-yszek, with -iszek/-yszek being used more frequently by the older generation, with the younger generation using -uszek more.

== See also ==
- Dialects of the Polish language
- Languages of Europe
- Polish language
