= Bromberg (surname) =

People with the Bromberg toponymic surname, and it indicates someone from Bromberg, include:

- Adam Bromberg (1912–1993), Polish publisher
- Andrew Bromberg, Aedas architect
- Andy Bromberg, political news analysis platform Sidewire founder
- Avraham Bromberg, American Rabbi and Talmudic scholar
- Betzy Bromberg, American director, editor, and experimental filmmaker
- Brian Bromberg (born 1960), American bassist and record producer
- Bruce Bromberg (born 1941), American Grammy Award winning producer of blues music
- Conrad Bromberg, Killer Instinct, Silent Witness writer and producer
- David Bromberg (born 1945), American guitarist
- Deacon "Deke" Bromberg, character in 2 Broke Girls
- Ellen Bromberg, American dance scholar
- Faith Bromberg (1919–1990), American painter active within the feminist art movement
- Frederick Bromberg, Bromberg's jewelry founder
- Frederick George Bromberg (1837–1930), American politician
- Gidon Bromberg (born 1963), Israeli director of EcoPeace Middle East
- Howard B. Bromberg, United States Army lieutenant general
- J. Edward Bromberg (1903–1951), Hungarian-American actor
- Konstantin Bromberg (1939–2020), film director
- Manuel Bromberg (born 1917), American artist and Professor of Art
- Moshe Bromberg (1920–1982), Polish-Jewish artist and sculptor
- Mordy Bromberg (born 1959), Australian football player
- Nick Bromberg, sports columnist and author
- Philip Bromberg, American psychologist and psychoanalyst
- Piet Bromberg (1917–2001), Dutch field hockey player
- Samantha Bromberg (born 1995), American diver (also known as Murphy Bromberg)
- Serge Bromberg (born 1961), French film director
- Stacy Bromberg (1956–2017), American darts player
