= Moshe Bromberg =

Polish artist and sculptor

Moshe Bromberg משה ברומברג
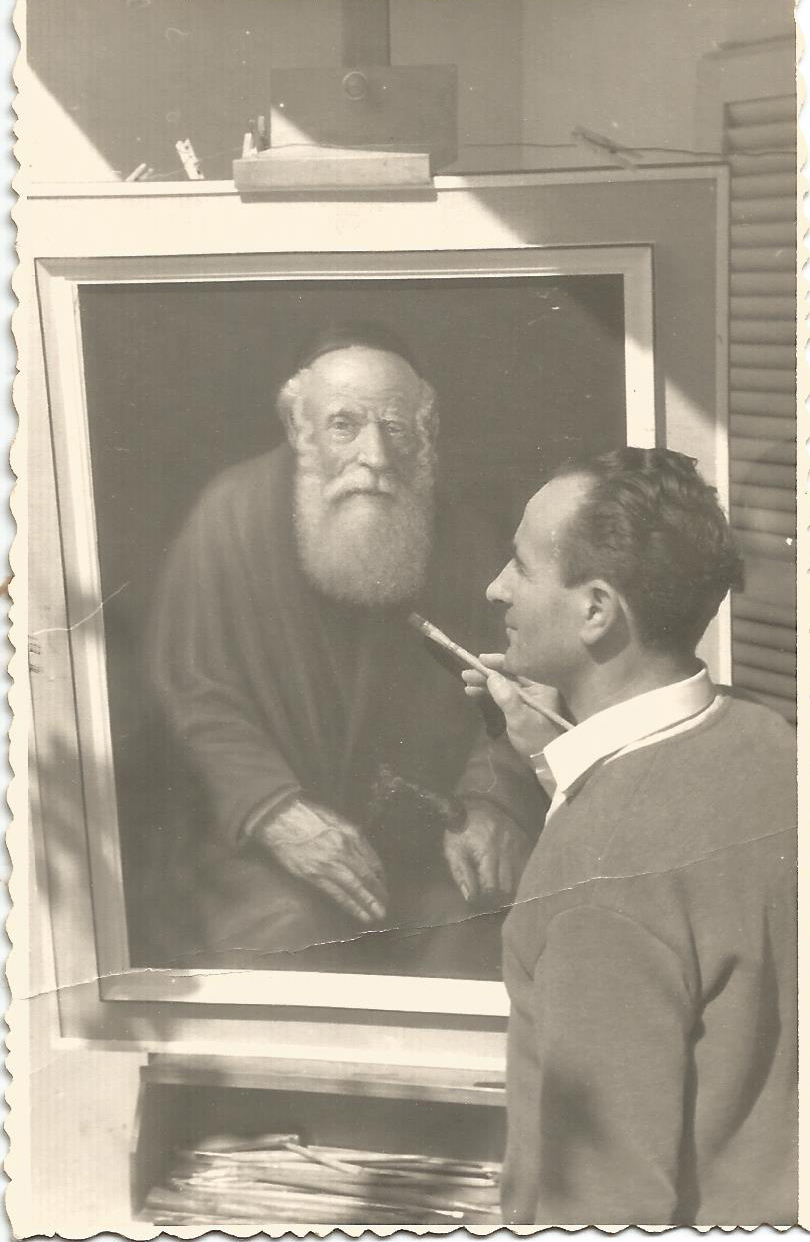
- Moshe Bromberg, 1970
- Born: December 1920; Piotrków Trybunalski, Poland
- Died: July 1982 (aged 61); Toronto, Ontario, Canada
- Known for: painting, sculpture

Moshe Bromberg (Moshe Bar-Am) (Hebrew: משה ברומברג; 1920–1982) was a notable artist and sculptor.

Bromberg was born in Piotrków Trybunalski, near Łódź, Poland in December 1920. He was studying art in Kraków when the Second World War broke out. He and his brother were in a German concentration work camp for a short period but managed to escape, eventually ending in the USSR during the war, where he completed his studies and married Berta. Moshe's parents and sister were murdered in the Holocaust.

He returned to Poland after the war and began his long and fruitful career as an artist, sculptor, and art teacher. His first set of oil paintings and sketches, shown in various exhibitions throughout Poland between the period 1945–1950, depicted the horrors he experienced during the war. Bromberg (who changed his name to Moshe Bar-Am) continued his artwork after immigrating to Israel in the summer of 1950 with his wife, son, and daughter. After getting encouragement from the first President of Israel (Itzhak Ben-Zvi), he started working on a unique set of twenty miniature paintings in gouache, showing various biblical subjects. He exhibited his paintings in numerous solo and group exhibitions in Israel (mostly in Ramat-Gan), often addressed by VIPs such as Abba Eban and Menachem Begin. He was awarded artistic merits and distinction and had his art work displayed in various galleries and museums (besides Poland). Later on, his mostly oil paintings, on subjects ranging from Jewish Rabbis portraits, Partisans fighting, Israeli scenery, and still life were also exhibited in Canada.

Bromberg died after a lengthy illness in July 1982 in Toronto, Ontario.
