= Chełmno–Dobrzyń dialect =

Northern dialect of Polish

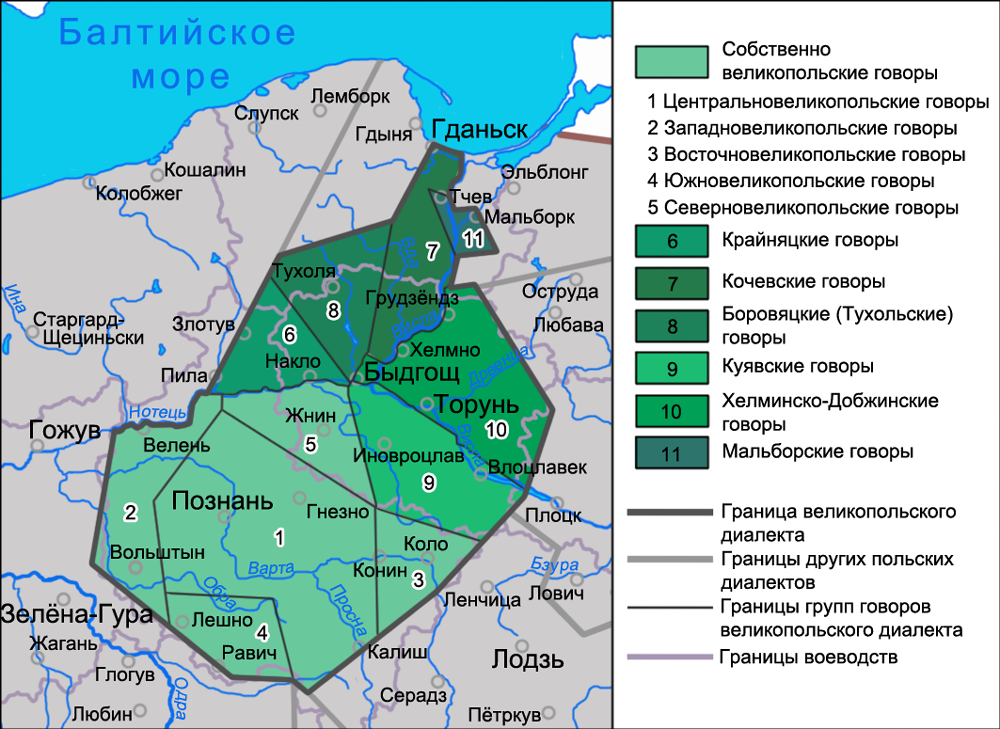
- Native to: Poland
- Region: Chełmno, Dobrzyń
- Language family: Indo-European: Balto-Slavic; Slavic; West Slavic; Lechitic; Polish; Greater Polish; Chełmno–Dobrzyń dialect

Language codes
- ISO 639-3: –

The Chełmno–Dobrzyń dialect (Polish: gwary chełmińsko-dobrzyńskie) belongs to the Greater Poland dialect group and is located in the northern part of Poland. It borders the Bory Tucholskie dialect to the East, the Kociewie dialect to the north, the Kujawy dialect to the south, the Masovian Lubawa dialect to the northeast, and the Near Mazovian dialect to the southeast.

Originally considered by Kazimierz Nitsch to be the oldest subdialect which had significant influence on Pomeranian dialects, Kocevian, Malborsko-lubawski, Warmian, and even Masurian, and even considered a separate supradialect separate from Greater Polish and Masovian, called the Chełmno–Dobrzyń–Kociewie supradialect, the Chełmno–Dobrzyń dialect is now considered to be part of the Greater Polish dialect. This disagreement in classification is likely due to the fact that the Chełmno–Dobrzyń subdialect is a transitionary subdialect, having both Kujavian and Masovian raits. Aside from both Greater Polish and Masovian influence, Chełmno–Dobrzyń has also been affected much by German and somewhat by Russian.

== Phonology ==
As is typical of Greater Polish dialects, mazuration is not present. Presence of voicing or devoicing of word-final consonants before vowels and liquids is mixed; in the past voicing, typical of Greater Polish dialects, was more common, but in recent years devoicing from Masovian influence has been becoming more popular.

=== Vowels ===
The Chełmno–Dobrzyń dialect shows many features in the vowel system typical of other Greater Polish dialects, with some features also found in Masovian dialects or Standard Polish.

There are many influences from Masovian dialects. Medial -ar- can shift to -er-. The group li often hardens to ly. Soft labials often decompose here, especially soft ḿ becomes mń: do mniasta (do miasta).

==== Slanted vowels ====
Slanted á raises to o, or in recent times merges with a. Slanted é raises to i (after soft consonants) or to y (after hard consonants), frequently in the third person singular indicative verb forms and relatively often in -ir-/-yr- clusters. ó raises to u and can be seen in some words it is not in Standard Polish due to Masovian influence: zóstałem, pronounced zustałem (zostałem).

==== Nasal vowels ====
ę behaves similarly to ę in Standard Polish, i.e. decomposes in front of consonants and denasalizes word-finally, but historically sounded more like a nasal a, with the same characteristics just mentioned. (ęC > aNC, -ę > -a); ę also sometimes has a tendency to raise, giving yN or iN, but lowering is more common. Word-final -ą raises and denasalizes, becoming -u, or less frequently, > -o. Initially it raises and decomposes: ą > uN. Similarly, the group oN typically raises to óN (pronounced uN).

==== Prothesis ====
Initial o typically labializes to ô, resulting in occasional hypercorrection: łopata (opata). Initial i can sometimes gain a prothetic j- and sometimes further lower to je-, and this can lead to hypercorrections: eszcze (jeszcze).

=== Consonants ===
Masovian influences can be seen in the consonants. The group św’ hardens: dla śwyni (dla świni). The group chy often softens to chi, and the groups kie, gie often harden to ke, ge.

ł is often lost intervocalically or in consonant clusters. kt changes to cht.

=== Contraction ===
Verbs often appear in uncontracted forms: bojić (bać).

== Inflection ==
Both Greater Polish and Masovian traits can be found in the inflections of this dialect.

=== Nouns ===
Many Masovian influences can be seen in the inflection. The instrumental plural ending -ami often hardens to -amy.

There is a preference for -ów as the genitive plural ending regardless of gender.

=== Adjectives, adverbs, pronouns, and numerals ===
Word final -ej may shift -i/-y or ij/yj, usually in the comparative of adverbs or the genitive/locative feminine singular of adjectives, numerals, and pronouns: późni (później)j, pszennyj (pszennej), wiency (więcej). -em may be used in adjectives, numerals, and pronouns for the masculine/neuter locative singular instead of -ym/-im: pruskiem (pruskim), w takem kraju (w takim kraju). The genitive singular is often -ygo/-igo as a reflex of slanted é.

=== Verbs ===
Ablaut is often levelled in verb forms: bieru (biorą). Word final -ił/-ył may shift to -uł in verb forms: buł (był). -m is sometimes retained in the first person plural past tense instead of -śmy: kupowalim (kupowaliśmy). -ma (due to Masovian influence) and -m may appear for the first person plural present tense and imperative: chodzima (chodzimy), możym (możemy). The second person plural present tense is often formed with -ta: zobaczyta (zobaczycie).

== Vocabulary ==
=== Word-Formation ===
==== Nouns ====
Augmentatives are often formed with -ch and -sko, as in Greater Polish dialects. Nouns denoting young animals and people are formed with -ak, as in Masovian dialects. The noun forming suffix -awa is productive here.

==== Adjectives, adverbs, pronouns, and numerals ====
Formation of nominal numerals from collective numerals: pięcioro > pięciórka (Standard Polish pięć > piątka)

== Syntax ==
The form dwa may be used for feminine nouns instead of dwie: dwa żony (dwie żony). Like many other dialects, there is a tendency to somehow reduce the number of genders - Chełno-Dobrzyń is divided into different groups depending on what it merges. One group uses non-virle forms with otherwise virile nouns; some use virile verb forms with non-virile nouns. Similarly, some speakers use so-called deprecative forms of masculine personal nouns neutrally. Another cross-dialectal feature is the common confusion of the prepositions bez and przez.

== See also ==
- Dialects of the Polish language
- Languages of Europe
- Polish language
