= Nick Bromberg =

American sports columnist

Nick Bromberg is an American sports columnist and author. He currently writes for Yahoo Sports reporting on college football and automobile racing.
