= Eastern Greater Poland dialect =

Dialect of Polish spoken in Poland

- Native to: Poland
- Region: Eastern Greater Poland
- Language family: Indo-European: Balto-Slavic; Slavic; West Slavic; Lechitic; Polish; Greater Polish; Eastern Greater Poland dialect

Language codes
- ISO 639-3: –

The Eastern Greater Poland dialect (Polish: gwary wschodniowielkopolskie) belongs to the Greater Poland dialect group and is located in the part of Poland. It borders the Kujawy dialect to the north, the Central Greater Polish dialect to the east, and the Lesser Poland Łęczyca dialect to the northwest and the Sieradz dialect to the southwest.

== Phonology ==
Typical of Greater Polish dialects, voicing of word-final consonants before vowels and liquids is present here. Also typical of Greater Polish dialects, mazuration is not present. A few words may appear to have mazuration, in reality are the result of morphology.

=== Vowels ===
Diphthongization is rare here, in contrast to many other subdialects of Greater Polish. Tautosyllabic -aj often shifts to -ej.

==== Slanted vowels ====
Slanted é often raises to i or y. Slanted ó is retained ó/u. Slanted á raises to o. e, o, and a may also raise to similar positions before sonorants, particularly nasals.

==== Nasal vowels ====
Nasal ę and ą decompose and raise word-medially to iN, yN and oN, -óN. Word final -ę denasalizes, and word-final -ą is typically realized as -om, -óm.

==== Prothesis ====
o tends to labialize to ô, especially word-initially.

=== Consonants ===
A common shift of trz, drz>czsz, dżż>cz, dż, strz, zdrz>szczsz, żdżż>szcz, żdż is present. Other simplifications include wszysko (wszysko), and some instances of elision: pado (powiada). -ższ- in comparatives is usually reduced to -sz-. The cluster -chrz- is usually realized as -krz-, and -pch- as -pk-. kt shifts to cht. Intervocalic ł is often lost, especially in the past tense: osiwiaa (osiwiała). -mi, -li are hardened regionally (i.e. in Golina-Kolonia) shifted to -my, ly due to Masovian influence: nogamy, polywka (nogami, polywka), but this is falling out of use.

=== Contraction ===
Some verbs do not show contraction: stojali (stali).

== Inflection ==
A few changes from Standard Polish can be seen here.

=== Nouns ===
A few words differ in gender from Standard Polish, but this is irregular. -ów is usually used as the genitive plural ending, regardless of gender.

=== Adjectives, adverbs, pronouns, and numerals ===
The adverb comparative ending and adjective/pronoun/numeral feminine genitive/locative singular ending -ej shifts to -ij/-yj and sometimes further to -i/-y (drugi (drugiej)). The genitive singular ending for adjectives and pronouns are -egu, -egó/-ygy (-ego). In the past tense, often -m is used over -śmy as a result of Kujavian influence.

=== Verbs ===
Verbs may appear without ł in the past tense due to sound changes. The imperative is formed with -ej instead of -aj as a result of sound changes. -ta, from the old dual, is sometimes used as the second person plural present tense verb ending instead of -cie. Whereas Standard Polish is generally speaking a pro-drop language, pronouns might be used here more in the first person singular past tense. Verbs usually have the personal clitics -m, -ś, etc., but are sometimes omitted, this giving rise to a preference for using pronouns.

== Syntax ==
Masculine personal nouns are usually levelled to masculine animal nouns, but the virile forms of verbs are used for all plurals. Very rarely the prepositions bez and przez are mixed up.

== See also ==
- Dialects of the Polish language
- Languages of Europe
- Polish language
