= Krajna dialect =

Dialect of Polish spoken in Poland

- Native to: Poland
- Region: Krajna
- Language family: Indo-European: Balto-Slavic; Slavic; West Slavic; Lechitic; Polish; Greater Polish; Krajna dialect

Language codes
- ISO 639-3: –

The Krajna dialect (Polish: gwara krajeńska) belongs to the Greater Poland dialect group and is located in the north-western part of Poland. It borders the Bory Tucholskie dialect to the northeast, the Northern Greater Polish dialect to the south, and the Kashubian language to the north. Due to its position, it is a transitional dialect and shares many features with neighboring dialects and languages, and is very diverse.

== Phonology ==
Atypical of Greater Polish dialects, Krajna generally devoices consonants at the ends of words before vowels and semivowels as a result of Kashubian influence, except for a small part in the south. Typical of dialects of Greater Polish, Krajna does not have mazuration.

=== Vowels ===
Like other Greater Polish dialects, Krajna historically had a tendency to break monophthongs into diphthongs, or occasionally tripthtongs, but this is irregular, and occurs more in the north-west. Generally the final component of these diphthongs is non-syllabic u̯, or sometimes e̯ and i̯. Breaking vowels include slanted á (>au̯, ou̯), o (> ᵘ̯o, oe̯, ᵘ̯oe̯), slanted ó (> ᵘ̯ó, oy̯), and y (>yi̯ after sz ż rz cz c dz, or in the south after all hard consonants), and not a or u. Nowadays it's more common to use monophthongal pronunciation. y in Krajna has a tendency to be fronted, phonemically merging with i (but phonetically approaching it), and only the hardness of the consonant remains the deciding factor within a word. In the past there the group eł often shifted to oł, kiołbasa, wołna, which now only occurs in a few words and small regions of Krajna. The groups ił and ył had a tendency to lower, giving éł, or to uł in Sępolno. The common northern changes of ra- > re-, ja- > je- and -ar->-er- can only be found in certain words here.

==== Slanted vowels ====
Western Krajna raises old slanted é to y, whereas Eastern Krajna maintains it, but sometimes raises it to y after hard consonants and to i after soft consonants. Slanted á can either raise to o, or merge with a. Slanted ó tends to diphthongize.

==== Nasal vowels ====
Historically, Krajna had a tendency to lower nasal ę and the group eN to ą (nasal a) and aN word-internally, except in the north-west. In modern times keeping nasal ę and eN is preferred, or they are raised to yN/iN (after soft consonants), and ą is often raised to uN. Hypercorrection of aN to eN sporadically occurs: kolano (koleno). Word-finally, -ę denasalizes and -ą becomes -óm, -um in the south, whereas in the north nasality is retained.

==== Prothesis ====
Often initial o- labializes wo- or ô-, and some words starting with wo- etymologically may be pronounced with łô-: ôda (woda).

=== Consonants ===
In the past there was a Kashubian-like tendency to palatalize k’, g’ > ć, dź or even cz, dż which is now uncommon. srz, zrz > chrz- (krz-) in the northwest and śr, źr in the south-east. ł may be weakened or lost word-initially at the end of a consonant cluster. Krajna also typically degeminizes doubled consonants, changes rs, rrz, rrz > rz, strz, zdrz, trz, drz > szcz, żdż, cz, dż, and simplifies other clusters as well. The verb iść when prefixed is generally pronounced with -ń-: dońde.

== Inflection ==
Krajna shows features typical of northern dialects, Greater Polish dialects, as well as some influence from Kashubian in inflection.

=== Nouns ===
The ending -ewi after soft consonants in the dative singular and occasionally in the nominative plural -ewie. There are more nominative plural forms for masculine personal nouns than in Standard Polish, with more fluctuation. -oma, from the old instrumental dual, as the instrumental plural can be seen here. Some feminine nouns ending in -w are extended: brzytwa || brzytew (brzytwa) brwia || brwa || brew (brew). -ów may be used as the masculine plural ending regardless of gender. Use of slanted -é in the nominative singular of neuter nouns (alongside -e): polė, pole (pole). neuter nouns ending in -ę have declension levelled: cielę || ciela instead (cielę || cielęcie).

=== Adjectives, adverbs, pronouns, and numerals ===
The ending -ewy after soft consonants in adjectives can be seen here. Slanted -é- in the masculine/neuter genitive singular of adjectival/pronominal forms is retained here: taniyᵉgo (taniego). The masculine/neuter instrumental singular is formed with -ém instead of -ym/-im, and the genitive/locative plural is formed with -éch. Numeral declensions are levelled and a preference for using a single form for all cases, chiefly in the north, and in other parts certain obsolete forms are retained: piąci (pięciu).

=== Verbs ===
The past tense of verbs can take forms such as biyᵉła, (biła), mówiyᵉli (mówiła), or piuła (piła), zrobiuł (zrobiła), buł (był) in Sępolno due to lowering. -m can be used as a first person plural present tense or first person plural imperative ending of verbs: idziyᵉm (idziemy). The first person plural imperative is made with -ma via contamination of -wa with -my alongside -my and -m, which used to make a request more polite request. -ta is used as a second person plural present tense ending from the old second person dual ending, often used alongside -cie. Eastern and central Krajna typical have -ta and the West has -cie. The past tense can be built in three ways. It can be built analytically with a pronoun or noun and the verb in the past tense without personal clitlcs: jo był (byłem). It can be built with pronoun or noun with the particle że with a personal clitic and the verb in the past tense without the clitic: jo żem szed (szedłem). Rarely, it can be built as in Standard Polish. A fourth, rare way exists for the first person plural past, where -m substitutes -śmy: bylim (byliśmy). Levelling of ablaut and consonant alternation occurs in the northwest: ja bierze (biorę).

== Vocabulary ==
=== Word-Formation ===
Krajna shows typical Greater Polish word formation tendencies with some Masovian influence.

==== Nouns ====
Diminutive are formed with of -yszek/-yszka/-yszko. -ówa is often used as a noun-forming suffix. Pejorative terms are often formed with -as and -al. Terms denoting trees are formed with -arka.

==== Adjectives, adverbs, pronouns, and numerals ====
Relational adjectives may be formed with -ny where in Standard Polish is -owy.

==== Verbs ====
Occasionally verbs end in -eć may also end in -ić infinitives: siedzić (siedzieć). An archaic retention of ot- instead of od- and s- instead of z- can be seen here in some prefixed verbs. -ować is often used to form imperfective verbs rather than Standard Polish -iwać/-ywać. Alternatively, -ać may occur in place of -ować: kupać (kupować), zdejmać (zdejmować), znajdać (znajdować).

== Syntax ==
The masculine personal gender is usually levelled to masculine animal. The form dwa may be used with feminine nouns in parts of eastern, northern, and western Krajna, except in the south dwie for feminine nouns is retained: dwa kôzyʲ (dwie kozy).

== See also ==
- Dialects of the Polish language
- Languages of Europe
- Polish language
