= Kuyavian dialect =

Dialect of Polish spoken in Poland

- Native to: Poland
- Region: Kuyavia
- Ethnicity: Kuyavians
- Language family: Indo-European: Balto-Slavic; Slavic; West Slavic; Lechitic; Polish; Greater Polish; Kuyavian dialect

Language codes
- ISO 639-3: –

The Kuyavian dialect (Polish: gwara kujawska) belongs to the Greater Poland dialect group and is spoken in Kuyavia. It borders the Chełmno-Dobrzyń dialect to the north, the Northern Greater Polish dialect to the west, the Eastern Greater Polish dialect to the south, the Masovian Near Mazovian dialect to the northwest and the Łęczyca dialect to the southeast.

== Phonology ==
Typical of Greater Polish dialects, word-final consonants voice before a vowel or liquid. Also typical of Greater Polish dialects, mazuration is not present.

=== Vowels ===
In the imperative of verbs, a change of -aj raising -ej is common, which can also be seen in a few adverbs: tutej, dzisiej, at one point in the superlative prefix naj- (sometimes realized as nej-): nejsterszy (najstarszy). What was once common, the change of ra-, ja- > re-, je- is now only in the word redło and its derivatives and jirzmo (from earlier jerzmo). A few other cases have been noted. a may velaralize after veral consonants: kłażdy (każdy). Medial o can labialize to ô but rarely, typically after velars, r, the labials p, b, v and the nasals m, n. Mobile e is sometimes levelled or inserted: bes||besu (bez||bzu), wiater (wiatr). As in some other Greater Polish dialects, sometimes -eł > -oł: krzysołko (krzysełko), zupołnie (zupełnie), kubołek (kubełek), but not in the east. Unlike other parts of Greater Poland, o does not typically break into diphthongs. i and y can lower closer to é or sometimes e after dental l or ł, more common in the east than the west. ił/ył can go to uł as a result of general Greater Polish influence, especially of past tense of verbs of the fourth conjugation (-ić/-yć) verbs, but there can be fluctuation even for the same speaker, who can also say the same form with -eł or -ił/-ył.

==== Slanted vowels ====
Pochylone á used to be preserved as á even as late as 1952, but is now realized as o, which can labialization after velar consonants: gôrsta (garstka). a can raise further to ó before nasals. Slanted é raises to i, or sometimes y, after soft consonants and to y after hard consonants. Slanted ó is partially retained, but sometimes merges with u. Final -o in declensions (ego > -ygu, -igu), some pronouns (gó i niegó, tegó), and the adverb dopiero (dopiru // dopieru // dopiyró) often raises.

==== Nasal vowels ====
Medial ę typically raises and decomposes to iN (after soft consonants, less common than yN), or to yN (after hard or soft consonants). Historically a lowered pronunciation could be heard, going to ą or aN. As a result of this, some words have undergone hypercorrection, such as tańcować > teńcowac. Word-final -ę denasalizes to -e. -ęl- can denasalize to -yl-, and future forms of być also can denasalize. The group aN raises eN commonly. Medial ą typically raises to and decomposes to óN, uN. Word finally it typically goes to -um. eN rises to yN after both hard and soft consonants, or sometimes to iN after soft consonants, both medially and word-finally, save sometimes for a few inflectional endings. oN typically raises to óN or sometimes uN. Conversely uN sometimes lowers to oN, óN.

==== Prothesis ====
Initial o- typically labializes to ô. Initial u- can also less commonly labialize to û-, or alternatively have a prothetic j-: jucho (ucho). Initial a-, i-, and e- typically get a prothetic j- as well. Initial h- sporadically can have a prothetic h-.

=== Consonants ===
w can be either voiced or devoiced after voiceless consonants. The groups śv’-, ćv’- sometimes harden: śfat (świat). Western Kujawy pronounces ł as in Standard Polish, whereas eastern Kujawy retains the old dark ł. l before back vowels is hard, and before front vowels is soft. In western Kujawy, hard l before front vowels can be found: glyna (glina). Historically the old pronunciation of rz was kept, but now can only be found in rzniwa and its derivatives, except in the west, where generally rz is now pronounced as in Standard Polish. Also in the past rz was sometimes replaced with r: zrucić, zdrucić. rż is generally pronounced as rż, not as rz, like in other Greater Polish subdialects. A feature characteristic to Kujawy is the depalatalization of m in some declensions and the forms of the pronoun ja: -ami, -imi, -ymi > -amy, -imy, -ymy, mi > my (dej my), mię > me). Notably the word anjoł is still pronounced with a hard n. In a few words as well as prefixed forms of iść, j is sometimes replaced with ń: niedwabny (jedwabny), dońdę (dojdę). sz, cz, and ż sometimes palatalize to ś, ć, and ź typically before soft l and in a few words. Similarly initial s- sometimes becomes sz-. z-, cz- > ż, c- is generally limited in the number of words where it occurs. The south has a tendency for szadzenie (c, s, z, dz > cz, sz, ż, dż) as a result of contact with Masurizing Masovia. Cekanie (cz > c) occurs in this region as well, but affects only a few words. soft k’, g’ are usually the same as in Standard Polish, but in the east may harden due to Chełmno-Dobrzyń influence. Historically hard velars could be seen in verbs formed with the frequentative -ywać: oszukywać (Standard oszukiwać). A typical change of kt- > cht- can be observed here. ch > k is preserved in a few words, which has led to hypercorrection in a few cases: wziąć za rękie. Doubled consonants usually undergo dissimilation: lekko – letko, miękko - miy̜ntko, and the group dl, dł usually goes to gl, gł: mgłe (mdłe). Initial consonant clusters are often simplified: dla > lo, gdzie > dzie, medial -l- and -w- may disappear, ł disappears from l-forms in the masculine: wszed (wszedł), jest is pronounced as jes, -izm is often pronounced as -iz, -ść/-źć is often pronounced as -ś, -ź: doś (standard dość), and epenthetic -d-, -n-, -k- i -ź- may occur.

=== Contraction ===
Uncontracted forms are usually present here: bojać sie (bać się).

== Inflection ==
Both Greater Polish and Masovian influences can be seen in the inflection.

=== Nouns ===
Some noun forms show a levelling of ablaut: wiesna (wiosna). Until recently, the masculine singular dative ending -ewi could still be seen after soft consonants, but is mostly replaced by -owi. The instrumental plural is -amy instead of -ami. Similar to other dialects, nouns in Kujavian can have a different gender than in Standard Polish. A preference for -a over -u for the genitive singular for masculine nouns can be seen, and -owi over -u for masculine nouns in the dative. A few animate nouns can show an accusative forms equal to the nominative, where typically one would see the genitive: na śwynty Józef, przez Duch Śwynty. Masculine nouns often have the nominative singular in place of the vocative singular, but a few personal names have the vocative singular as the nominative singular. Masculine personal nouns in the nominative plural often take -y or non-softening -i (after k, g) and -e, and rarely take -owie or softening -i. -ów as the genitive plural ending may be used after both hard and soft consonants, as well as for all genders, and the genitive plural ending -y/-y is very limited. There are two accusative singular endings for feminine nouns: -ę (which can be realized as -e or -a) for nouns with a historically short final -a, and -ą (which can be realized as -um) for nouns historically ending in a long a (i.e. ija, -yja, -ja).

=== Adjectives, adverbs, pronouns, and numerals ===
The superlative is occasionally formed with nej- instead of naj-. The instrumental plural is -imy, -ymy instead of -imi, -ymi. In adjectives and pronouns, -ech is used over -ych for the genitive/locative plural. Certain third person pronouns, especially when used possessively, can be extended with je-: jeji matka, nie jejich sprawa.

=== Verbs ===
Due to the raising of aj to ej, the imperative often takes a shape such as śpiwej (śpiewaj). Some verb forms show a levelling of ablaut: niese (niosę). The past tense of some verbs is sometimes -uł instead of -ył/-ił: buł (był), kupiuł (kupił). In verb conjugation, -ma is often used alongside -m and -my as a first person plural present/future ending, -ta is preferred as a second person plural present/future ending, with -cie being used for older referents as a formal second person ending. -ma is used commonly as a first person plural imperative ending, and -ta as a second person plural imperative ending, with -cie again being used as a formal ending showing respect. In the past tense, often -m is used over -śmy, or the particle żym may be used with an l-form (i.e. żym prali). -śta is used for the second person plural, and can be attached to words other than the verb.

=== Prepositions and prefixes ===
The prepositions and prefixes w(-) and z(-) often are extended with mobile e: we wozie (w wozie), weszet (wszedł), zeżar (zżarł).

== Vocabulary ==
Both Greater Polish and Masovian influences can be seen in the word-formation.

=== Word-Formation ===
Certain morphemes, which were used more during the Old Polish and Middle Polish era, can still be found here more frequently than in Standard Polish.

==== Nouns ====
Kujawy, having been influenced by Masovia, often uses -ak for young people and animals, along with other nouns. -as -ista are also used here more than in Standard Polish, and gerunds (-anie, -enie, -cie) might be used more than their non-gerund noun counterpart (od głowy bolynia instead of ból głowy). Augmentation is usually in the form of a noun suffixed with -isko, -icha, -ycho, or through back-formation.

==== Adjectives, adverbs, pronouns, and numerals ====
-aty as an adjective-forming suffix can be seen in place of Standard Polish -asty or -ity. Relational adjectives formed with -ny occur where in Standard Polish might be -owy, and adjectives denoting material are formed with -anny (Standard -ny). Standard Polish -awy (denoting a lower intensity, similar to English -ish) is replaced with prze-.

==== Verbs ====
Northern Kujavian often uses -ać instead of -ować: kupać||kupam instead of kupować||kupuję, especially prefixed verbs from -jąć: zajmać (Standard zajmować).

== Syntax ==
The form dwa can be used for feminine nouns: dwa krowy (dwie krowy).

== See also ==
- Dialects of the Polish language
- Languages of Europe
- Polish language
