= Northern Greater Poland dialect =

Dialect of Polish spoken in Poland

Northern Greater Polish dialect
- Native to: Poland
- Region: Northern Greater Poland
- Language family: Indo-European: Balto-Slavic; Slavic; West Slavic; Lechitic; Polish; Greater Polish; Northern Greater Polish dialect

Language codes
- ISO 639-3: –

The Northern Greater Polish dialect (Polish: gwary północnowielkopolskie) belongs to the Greater Poland dialect group and is located in the part of Poland. It borders the Krajna dialect to the northwest, the Kujawy dialect to the northeast, the Western Greater Polish dialect to the far southwest, and the Central Greater Polish dialect to the south. The exact borders of Northern Greater Polish are not clear. The Krzyszczewo and Wola Skorzęcka subdialect occupies part of Northern Greater Polish and part of Central Greater Polish geographically, and also somewhat linguistically. The dialect of these villages is increasingly affected by Standard Polish, as demonstrated by the number of similar features.

== Phonology ==
Typical of Greater Polish dialects, voicing of word-final consonants before vowels and liquids is present here. Also typical of Greater Polish dialects, mazuration is not present, except in Wieleń, where the so-called “Wieleń Masurs” are, who have masuration. In reality, they are not true Masurians, but are just called this due to their dialect.

=== Vowels ===
Northern Greater Polish has features typical of a Greater Polish dialect. ej may shift to y: z ty (z tej). In the past, like many Greater Polish dialects, monophthongs were often diphthongized: myjszyj (myszy). The change of ra-, ja- to re-, je- is found in a few words: redło (radło), jerzmo (jarzmo).

==== Slanted vowels ====
Slanted é often raises to i (after both hard and soft consonants) and to y (particularly after hard consonants). Slanted ó is retained ó. Slanted á raises to o.

==== Nasal vowels ====
Nasal ę and ą decompose word-medially to eN (or sometimes raised to iN, yN) and oN. Word final -ę denasalizes, and word-final -ą is typically realized as -om. Historically nasal vowels often completely denasalized: geś (gęś), ksiożka (książka).

==== Prothesis ====
Word initial o- and sometimes u- labialize to ô- and û-.

=== Consonants ===
kt-changes to cht. Sometimes medial -ch- changes to -k-: na wierzchu – na wierzku. In Wola Skorzęcka, r-z sometimes changes to rz (ż), szli can be realized as śli, and rękach can be realized as rencach. zrz simplifies to rz: rorzutnik, strz and trz simplify to szcz and cz, rdz to rz: barzej (bardziej), ść to ś: przypuśmy (przypuśćmy), and doubled consonants are simplified into a single one: leki (lekki). Intervocalic ł is often lost, especially in the feminine past tense: nie suwaa (nie suwała).

=== Contraction ===
Uncontracted forms can be seen here: stojał (stać).

== Inflection ==
The inflectional features of this dialect are typical for a Greater Polish dialect.

=== Nouns ===
A few nouns differ in gender from Standard Polish: wuja (wuj). Mobile e is sometimes not lost in declensions in certain declensions: myndele (myndle). The instrumental plural -mi is often levelled to -ami: koniami (końmi). -ów is used as a genitive plural ending regardless of gender. There is a preference for -a for the masculine genitive singular over -u.

=== Adjectives, adverbs, pronouns, and numerals ===
The feminine genitive/locative singular and comparative of adverbs may be -y/-i instead of -ej as a result of sound changes.

=== Verbs ===
First person plural past tense verbs typically take -m instead of -śmy: zbieralim (zbieraliśmy). The third person feminine past may be -aa due to loss of intervocalic -ł-. Verbs containing -nąć often lose -ną-, -nę- in the past tense: zamkło (się) (zamknęło (się)). The past tense is occasionally formed analytically: ja żem robił (robiłem).

== Vocabulary ==
=== Word-Formation ===
Word-formation in this dialect is typical of a Greater Polish dialect.

==== Nouns ====
Common noun suffixes are -acz(ka), -ak/-ok, -arka/-orka, -arnia, -arz/-orz, -ec, -ek, -ik/-yk, -ica, -icha, -isko/-ysko, -ówka.

==== Adjectives, adverbs, pronouns, and numerals ====
Adjectives formed with -aty are common here.

== Syntax ==
Masculine personal nouns are often levelled to masculine animal nouns here.

== See also ==
- Dialects of the Polish language
- Languages of Europe
- Polish language
