= Bromberg's =

Specialty retailer in Alabama, United States

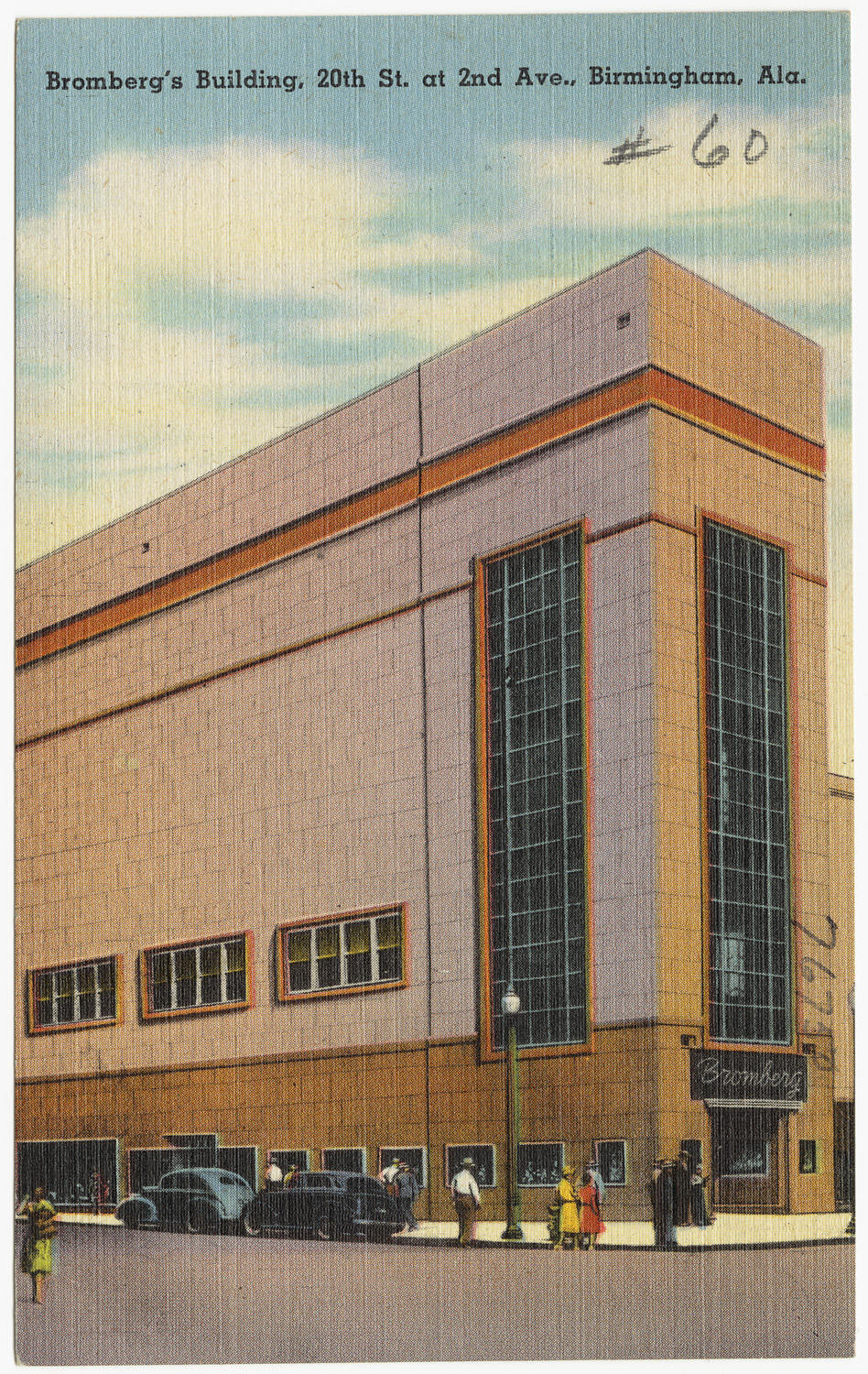
- Bromberg's Building at 20th St. at 2nd Ave., Birmingham, Alabama, circa 1930–1945.
- Type: Private
- Industry: jewelry
- Founded: 1836; 190 years ago Birmingham, Alabama, United States
- Founder: Frederick Bromberg
- Headquarters: Birmingham, Alabama; Mountain Brook, Alabama
- Website: brombergs.com

Bromberg's is a jewelry, crystal, silver and gift retailer with two locations in the Birmingham, Alabama area. The firm was founded by Prussian immigrant Frederick Bromberg in Mobile in 1836, the oldest family owned and operated retail business in the United States and the oldest business firm operating in the state.

== Mobile ==
Bromberg traveled to New York in 1832 after Napoleon's invasion made his village (Bromberg) a part of Poland. He worked as a silversmith and married Lisette Cunigarde Dorothea Beetz, a native of Hamburg. On the recommendation of acquaintances, the couple set off for the port of Mobile to start a new life together. They arrived on the packet boat Lewis Cass, he wasted no time setting up shop at the corner of Walter & St Michael streets. He started by stocking musical instruments, pianos and sheet music, gradually adding jewelry and gifts. He did well at first, but the panic of 1837, accompanied by a fire that destroyed his store two years later, forced Bromberg to start from scratch.

At his second store, at 22 Dauphin Street, Bromberg added furniture, toys and antiques to his inventory. A yellow fever epidemic threatened the business again as most of the city was affected. Mrs Bromberg, weakened by the disease, was sent to Cambridge, Massachusetts for its more healthful climate while Frederick labored alone. She returned in 1840, and the business finally started to grow and prosper.

Bromberg's sons, Frederick G. Bromberg and Charles, and his son-in-law Emil O. Zadek all joined the business, which was interrupted by the Civil War. When the elder Bromberg died in 1884, Charles and Zadek took over the business as partners. Over time, Charles became enamored of living in Bayou la Batre, where he had begun operating a resort, and Zadek took over daily operations of the Bromberg store.

== Birmingham ==
Charles' son, Frederick W. Bromberg, grew up in the family business and in 1900 made the decision, with his wife, Virginia, to open a store in the rapidly growing city of Birmingham. He bought out an existing jeweler, Gluck and Black, and took over their space in Linn's Folly, the first home of the First National Bank of Birmingham. His sign read F. W. Bromberg, Jeweler. He relocated to the new Farley Building two blocks north when it was completed in 1902. In the next years his four children, William, Robert, Charles and Frank, all began working in the store. At their father's direction, they each served apprenticeships outside the company to gain expertise in different areas of the business.

William spent time with the Whitehouse Brothers, a Cincinnati diamond manufacturer, and became a registered jeweler through the American Gem Society. Robert studied business at Harvard. Charles apprenticed in the New England silver industry, and Frank learned the furniture and accessory business in Chicago. Following World War I, F. W. Bromberg travelled to Germany and bought up significant inventories of precious objects from museums.

The expanding business moved into a larger space at 218 20th Street North in 1920. The four young men formed a partnership with their father in 1926. Cemented in its position as Birmingham's premiere jewelry and gift shop, the business was able to survive the Depression. The store branched out into optical and hearing aids and home air conditioning. The Brombergs also opened the first authorized Eastman Kodak dealer in the South. F. W. Bromberg died unexpectedly at his summer residence in Cape Cod in 1939. Charles left to pursue other interests, but the other three brothers stayed with the firm, which prospered during World War II.

After WWII ended construction began on a new retail location at 123 North 20th Street in Downtown Birmingham. This location is currently the corporate office for the company.

The company is currently under the leadership of Frederick W. "Ricky" Bromberg. He is a part of the sixth generation of Brombergs to run the business.

== New building ==
After the Drennon Department Store building at 123 20th Street North, at the intersection of 2nd Avenue burned in 1943, the Bromberg's negotiated to obtain the property for a grand new store. They hired J. Gordon Carr, the architect of Tiffany's 5th Avenue flagship store, to design the modern showcase. As soon as building materials were available following the war, Brice Building Company began work. The grand re-opening was held on July 22, 1946. Along with the new store, the brothers created a corporation, with Robert as president, William as vice-president, and Frank as secretary-treasurer.

== Expansion ==
Robert and William both died in the 1950s, leaving Frank to head the company along with his son, Frank Jr., William's son Gene, and Robert's son-in-law, Paul M. Byrne. In 1959 the company opened a second location in Mountain Brook Village.

In 1974, Bromberg's acquired the Underwood Jewelers Corporation of Jacksonville, Florida, creating a separate retail division for the company. In the decades to come the company opened stores in Montgomery, Huntsville, Tuscaloosa and Hoover which they eventually closed at varying times to concentrate on the Birmingham market.

In 2002 the company opened another location at The Summit.

On March 6, 2009 the company closed its downtown store, but renovated the building to keep it in use as the company's main office with active displays in the windows.
