= Greater Poland dialect group =

Dialect of the Polish language

- dialekt wielkopolski
- Native to: Poland
- Region: Greater Poland Voivodeship; Kuyavian-Pomeranian Voivodeship; Pomeranian Voivodeship
- Language family: Indo-European: Balto-Slavic; Slavic; West Slavic; Lechitic; Polish; Greater Poland dialect group
- Writing system: Latin (Polish alphabet)

Language codes
- ISO 639-3: –
- Glottolog: None
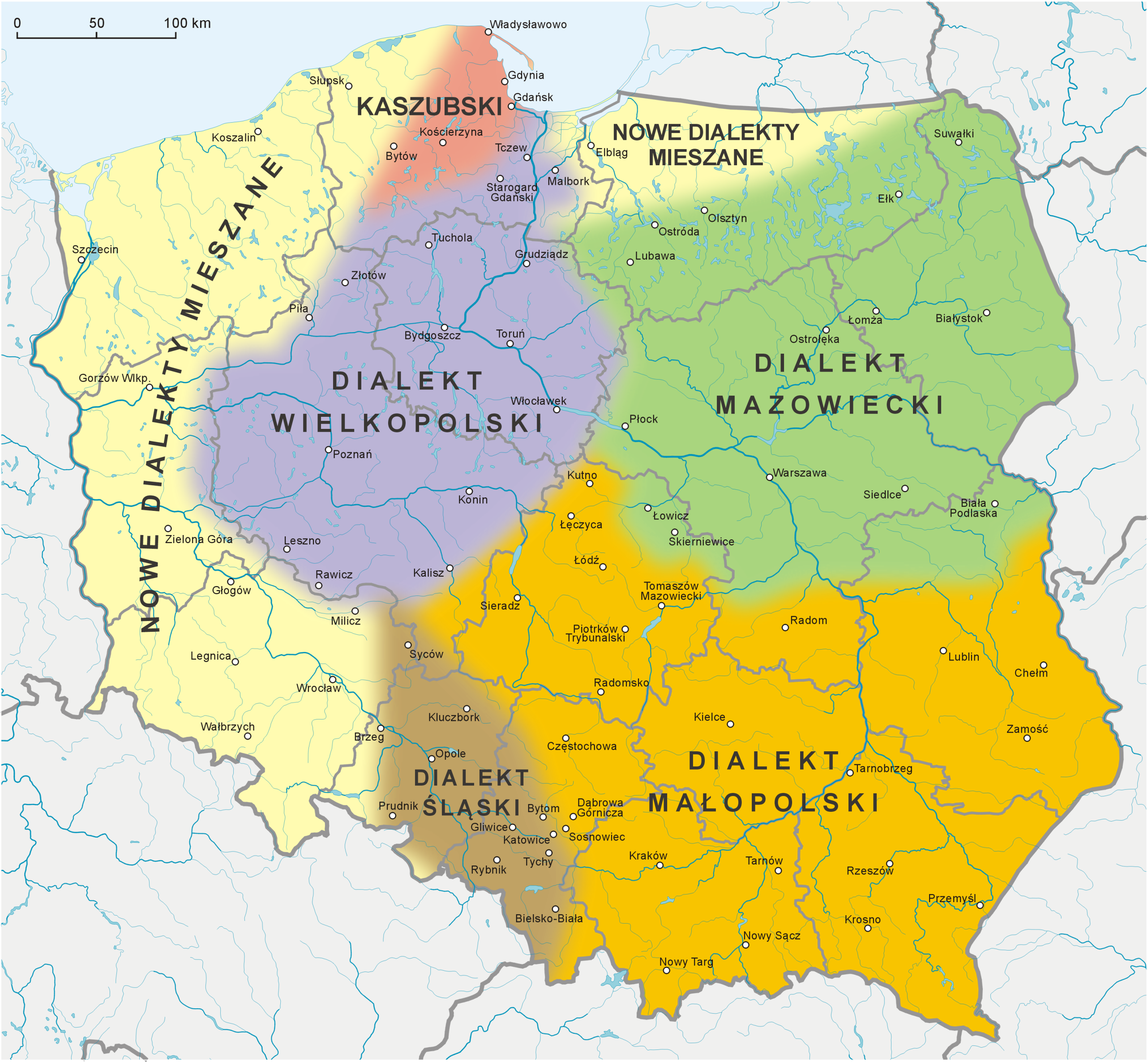
- Map of the dialects of Polish, including the Greater Poland dialect group marked in blue.

Greater Poland dialect group (Polish: dialekt wielkopolski) is a dialect group of the Polish language used in the Greater Poland. It is used in the area, on the south from the cities of Koło, Kalisz, Ostrów Wielkopolski, Rawicz, and Babimost, from the west from Międzychód and Krzyż Wielkopolski, and along the line of the rivers of Noteć and Warta.

== List of dialects ==
Descended from the Western Slavic language spoken by the Polans, the dialects are:

- Kociewie dialect
- Bory Tucholskie dialect
- Krajna dialect
- Chełmno-Dobrzyń dialect
- Kujawy dialect
- Northern Greater Poland dialect
- Western Greater Poland dialect
- Central Greater Poland dialect
- Eastern Greater Poland dialect
- Southern Greater Poland dialect

== Features of the region ==
Features that can be found in various intensities and distributions in the region include:

1. *telt > tlet: pleć, mleć, plewy
2. * tórt’ > trot: krowa
3. *ľ̥ > l̥ except *Pľ̥T́PK (after labials, before palatals/labials, and velars)
4. *Pľ̥T́PK > PilT́PK: wilk, milczeć or > łu after dentals: słup, długi, or oł after cz, ż, sz: mołwa, czółno, żółty, or eł after labials: chełm, chełpić się, wełna, pełny
5. *ŕ̥T > ‘ar: twardy, tarł, ziarno
6. voicing of coda stops and sibilants if the next word begins with a vowel or liquid
7. sporadic retention of bilabial v (v > w) słoje, prało, especially initially: łosk, łojna, łoda, reinforced by the labialization of initial o
8. -j- before palatals: niejsiejcie (niesiecie), ciojcia, na pojle, nojgi, tajkie
9. ḷ > ł > u̯: u̯ep, u̯za, pu̯uk
10. depalatalization of word final palatal labials
11. softening of n, t, d after i, y: drab́ińa, žyᶦ̯t́o, žyᶦ̯d́ek
12. phonemization of ḱ, ǵ from retaining them when they occurred before *y, ъ̥, e as well as denasalization of ę (kę/gę > ke/ge)
13. Tendency for assimilation and simplification:
  1. velarization of n before k (phonemic?)
  2. -ść, -śń > -ś: zleś, gryź, pleś, maś (maść)
  3. weakening loss of -ł- at the end of an inlaut (śródgłos): gᵘ̭ova
  4. strz, zdrz, trz, drz > szcz, żdż, cz, dż
  5. rs, r-z > rz skarzyć się, dzierzawa, marznie, gospodarztwo, stolarzki
  6. kk, szsz > k, sz leḱi, bliszy
14. the prepositions and prefixes w(-), z(-) > we, ze, especially if before a similar a syllable starting with a phoneme of a similar place of articulation
15. śrz, źrz > śr, źr or > śtrz, źdrz
16. traces of *jь > je, jeskra, jegliwie
17. placement of stress on the penultimate syllable
18. Preference for pochylone o, kłůtka
19. ir > er (serce, śmierć, piersi) or ér
20. Raising of y closer to i or diphthongization
21. i > y after sz, ż, cz, dż, c, dz, rz (which later diphthongized like y above)
22. diphthongization of u > uᵘ̭, ůᵘ̭, or ȯᵘ̭, and further > ů, ȯ, or ö
23. Fronting, flattening, and narrowing of á
  1. before tautosyllabic j in the imperative: czekej
  2. in some names? see Old Polish
24. Diphthongization of á> áu̯, ou̯, ȯu̯, áᵘ̭, ȯᵘ̭: tráu̯va, prȯu̯vda
25. é > y after hard and soft consonant: brzyg. Kujawy/Sieradz changed é > y after hard consonants, but > i after soft
26. e > o, á before tautosyllabic u̯ (ł): páu̯ne, ḱáu̯basa, kȯᵘ̭ḱou̯ka
27. diphthongization of o > u̯o (not just initially)
28. as a result of o > u̯o, u̯o > u̯oe̯ > ᵘ̭oe̯, ᵘ̭o̭e
29. diphthongization of ȯ > u̯ȯ or even u̯ȯy̯, ᵘ̯ȯʸ̯, ȯy̯, ᵘ̯ᵒ̇y̯ᵉ (e is above y̯), ᵘ̯ᵒ̯y̯ᵉ, and sometimes u̯y, uy̯ (and ultimately?) > u
30. Old Polish ą̆ (in a short syllable) > y̨ or į after a soft consonant in the east, along with denasalization of the vowel into an assimilated nasal consonant before a consonant, and sometimes total nasal loss before sibilants
31. Old Polish ą̄ (in a long syllable) > ų along with denasalization of the vowel into an assimilated nasal consonant before a consonant, and sometimes total nasal loss before sibilants
32. -iszcze > -isko
33. spread of the suffixes -aty, -ity
34. use of od(-) before vowels and semivowels (as opposed to ot(-))
35. Loss of mobile e in the endings -ek, -ec in some names
36. Spread of -yszek
37. use of z(-) before vowels and semivowels (as opposed to s(-))
38. Replacement of old locative plural -’ex > -ach (which was originally feminine)
39. Replacement of genitive singular ending for feminine nouns ending in a consonant -’e with -’i (z ziemi)
40. Levelling of the nominative and accusative singular neuter endings -ē and -ĕ by spreading -é, polé
41. Replacement of the neuter nominative/accusative numeral dwie with the masculine dwa, dwa okna, and in the north further replacement of the feminine dwie with dwa
42. Prefixed iść type verbs with an inserted -ń-, vyᶦ̯ńde, zańde, přeńde
43. Hardening of the first person singular and plural verb endings such as idemy, złapę by analogy of idę and archaic grzebę
44. Spread of hard labial in l-forms of melę/pelę via contamination of ḿel-, ṕel, and the l-forms mełł-, pełl-
45. spread of the first person plural verb ending -my (over -m) under influence of the pronoun my, or in the north of -ma via contamination of -my with -va
46. Spread of -ma in the first person plural imperative verb form via contamination with -m(y) and -va, nieśma, nieźma
47. constructions such as nosił(a) jeśḿ > nosiłeśḿ > nosiłem (after m), and potential voicing of the stem, zaniůzem, zaniůs
48. the first person plural past ending -im (nieślim, from nieśli (je)smъ) sometimes softened via analogy with -(je)ś, -(je)ście as well as flattening with the pronoun my, resulting in nieśliśmy, in some subdialects replace with -śma, -źma with contamination of nieśli(je)śḿ and niosła(je)sva. In the north forms such as nieślimy were formed as a result of phonetic reduction of the old aorist nieślichmy.
49. Rise of masculine personal nouns.

== Citations ==
=== Bibliography ===
- Stanisław Dubisz, Halina Karaś, Nijola Kolis: Dialekty i gwary polskie. 1st edition. Warsaw: Wiedza Powszechna, 1995. ISBN 83-2140989-X.
