= Kurpie dialect =

Masovian dialect of Polish

- Native to: Poland
- Region: Kurpie
- Ethnicity: Kurpie Białe
- Language family: Indo-European: Balto-Slavic; Slavic; West Slavic; Lechitic; Polish; Masovian; Kurpie dialect

Language codes
- ISO 639-3: –

The Kurpie dialect (Polish: gwara kurpiowska) belongs to the Masovian dialect group and is located in the northeastern part of Poland. It borders the Masurian dialects to the north and the Far Mazovian dialect to the south. The Kurpie dialect is generally well preserved, and a strong cultural connection to the dialect can be felt amongst speakers. Standard Polish is used by most people in the region, often alongside Kurpian, and code-switching between the two frequently happens.

== Phonology ==
Typical of Masovian dialects, devoicing of word-final consonants before vowels and liquids is present here, including before clitics. Also typical of Masovian dialects is the presence of mazuration, however, due to influence from Standard Polish, this is disappearing.

=== Vowels ===
y phonemically merges with i (approaching it phonetically to ɪ), leaving the hardness of the previous consonant as the main phonemic determining factor: potraw·i (potrawy). Often the group er shifts to ir: dopsiro. Ablaut is often levelled: ziedro (wiadro), bzierzo (biorą). The shift of initial ja-, ra- > je-, re- is present: jek, (jak), redził (radzil). This was more common in the past, but often Standard Polish forms can be seen now. The shift of medial -ar- > -er- is also present: terło (tarło). This was more common in the past, but often Standard Polish forms can be seen now.

==== Slanted vowels ====
Slanted á is generally retained as á, or may sometimes raise and merge with o, or uncommonly merge with a. Slanted é is generally retained as é, with much phonetic variation, or may also be merged with e due to influence from Standard Polish. Slanted ó is generally retained as ó, with much phonetic variation, and may also appear in places different than in Standard Polish.

==== Nasal vowels ====
Typically medial ę as well as the group eN are lowered, and ę generally decomposes: bańdzie. However, much variety depends on the village, non-lowered or raised variants (to éN, yN/iN) also exist: bendzie, as well as non-decomposed forms. Lowering of ę is becoming less popular, and can mostly be seen in final position (with denasalization): na ziosna (na wiosnę), and either eN or yN/iN are more dominant. Word finally, -ę denalasaizes to -e. The lowering of eN is still relatively common: przed progam (przed progiem). Hypercorrections also occurs: peniętam (pamiętam). Medial ą tends to decompose to oN, or sometimes raises to uN: ciungnik (ciągnik). Word finally, -ą denasalizes to -o in the east; in the west nasality is retained. The group oN tends to raise to óN and sometimes further to uN: stróny (strony), but the standard realization oN also can be heard. iN, yN, and uN often lowers, particularly iN: jenacej (inaczej). o before a liquid often raises: kórole (korale), and e before a liquid often lowers to a: sztalmach (sztelmach). ył/ił often shifts to uł: pozwoluł (pozwolił). The groups ęł, ęl, ął tend to replace l, ł with n: wzieno (wzięło).

==== Prothesis ====
Initial o- often labializes to ô-, and to a lesser extend u- to û-. However, non-labialized forms are also present. Initial i- and e- can rarely gain a prothetic j-.

=== Consonants ===
Soft labials are decomposed, most often to a labial and a palatal sibilant; rarely the palatalizing element is instead strengthened to j, or sometimes h, ch is the second element: robzio (robią), ustąpsiuł (ustąpił), wzino (wino). Sometimes the resulting cluster simplifies, particularly wź, fś, mń to ź, ś, ń: ziecora (wieczora). This decomposition can vary somewhat village to village. ki, gi, kie, gie are often hardened, but soft pronunciations are more common: kedyś (kiedyś). kt shifts to cht: chto (kto). chrz shifts to krz: krzesny (chrzestny). Geminated kk dissimilates to tk: letko (lekko).

=== Contraction ===
Verbs may appear in both contracted and uncontracted forms here: stojała, stała (stała).

== Inflection ==
Typical Masovian features of inflection are present here.

=== Nouns ===
The instrumental plural ending is generally -ani (from -ami). The typical Masovian ending is -amy, via hardening, which is exceptional here. The masculine dative singular ending for nouns is -oziu (rarely -owju or -oju) (from earlier -owiu) from contamination of -owi and -u: konioziu (koniowi). Masculine and neuter nouns ending in sz, ż, as a result of mazuration, sometimes take -e instead of -u in the locative singular: o kosie (o koszu). The nominative plural of masculine personal nouns is formed with -e more commonly than in Standard Polish: ojce byli (ojcowie byli). Alternatively, masculine personal nouns are often converted to masculine animal nouns: te majstry (ci majstrowie/majstrzy). There is a preference for -ów as the genitive plural ending regardless of gender or the softness of the stem. Feminine nouns ending in -ew are often declined differently: za krokwe (za krokiew), as if from the nominative singular krokwa. A few nouns have a gender different than in Standard Polish. Often neuter nouns ending in -ę do not take -n- in declensions: dwa wynia (dwa wymiona).

=== Adjectives, adverbs, pronouns, and numerals ===
Adjectives, pronouns, and numerals take -em in the masculine instrumental/locative singular instead of standard -ym/-im: po tem wszystkiem (po tym wszystkim). The plural is often -eni (from earlier -emi): całeni dniani (całymi dniami). Similarly, the genitive/locative plural is -ech: tech (tych).

=== Verbs ===
The first person plural present tense of verbs is formed with the archaic -m: idziem (idziemy). In the past tense, -m is also present in place of standard -śmy: robilim (robiliśmy). The second person plural past tense and imperative of verbs is sporadically formed with -ta in place of -cie: daliśta (daliście). The third person plural past tense if often formed with -eli in place of standard -ali: sieli (siali). Forms and derivatives often appear without j: przyde (przyjdę).

== Vocabulary ==
=== Word-Formation ===
Typical Masovian features of word-formation are present here.

==== Nouns ====
Nouns denoting young animals and people are formed with -ak: dziewcoki (dziewczęta).

==== Verbs ====
Frequentatives may be formed with -ać where in Standard Polish is often -ywać/-ować: kupać (kupować).

== Syntax ==
Dwa may be used for feminine nouns instead of dwie: dwa krowy (dwie krowy).

== Standardization ==
From 2009 to 2019, Professor Jerzy Rubach, with the help of Związek Kurpiów, published a series of monographs proposing a literary standard for the dialect. This orthography has been well received by Związek Kurpiów and numerous publications in that time have used it, including a dictionary. Siatkowska opines that this process did not fully take regional variation into consideration. Gadomski in his dictionary provides some information in regional variation.

In the north-west, near Gmina Jednorożec, slanted å does not occur; this variation is recommended to be spelled, but pronounced as if ⟨a⟩; furthermore soft ḿ has only partially decomposed to mń, elsewhere ń. In the south-east, slanted å is realized as o, but it is recommended to also spell this as ⟨a⟩. Near Myszyniec, ⟨ë⟩ approaches or meges with a, but spellings with ⟨ë⟩ are prescribed as with pronunciation variations of ⟨å⟩; also here prothetic ł before a is more common, but is rarer in other places. Gadomski uses central dialects for the basis of his dictionary, but does not proscribe spellings with ⟨mń⟩ instead of ⟨ń⟩, e.g. mńasto instead of ńasto.

=== Orthography and pronunciation ===
Rubach proposes the following rules for writing Kurpian, based on his analysis of pronunciation and grammar of the region:

1. Word-final voiced consonants ⟨b w d z dz rz (as /ʐ/) ź dź g⟩ are pronounced as if voiceless ⟨p f t s c rz (as /ʂ/) ś ć k⟩, but written voiced for morphological reasons.
2. ⟨u⟩ is pronounced as in Standard Polish.
3. ⟨e⟩ is pronounced as in Standard Polish.
4. ⟨ï⟩ is pronounced as /ɪ/.
5. ⟨ï⟩ occurs after ⟨ś ź ć dź ń j⟩.
6. ⟨y⟩ is pronounced as /ɘ/.
7. ⟨y⟩ occurs in the same position as in Standard Polish as well as after ⟨l k g ch h⟩.
8. ⟨a⟩ is pronounced as /æ~ä/.
9. ⟨å⟩ is pronounced as /ɑ~ɒ/.
10. ⟨ó⟩ is pronounced as /o/.
11. ⟨ó⟩ occurs before ⟨m n ń⟩ instead of ⟨o⟩.
12. ⟨é⟩ is pronounced as /e/.
13. ⟨ë⟩ is pronounced as /ə/.
14. ⟨ë⟩ occurs before ⟨m n ń⟩ instead of ⟨e⟩.
15. ⟨ę̈⟩ is pronounced as /ə̃/ and ⟨ą⟩ is pronounced as /o/.
16. ⟨ë⟩ is used instead of ⟨ę⟩ and ⟨ó⟩ is used instead of ⟨ą⟩ word-finally.
17. ⟨ś ź ć dź ń⟩ are used instead of ⟨si zi ci dzi ni⟩ and otherwise occur as in Standard Polish.
18. ⟨pi bi fi wi mi⟩ (from soft bilabials) are written and pronounced as ⟨pś bź ś ź ń⟩.
19. ⟨y⟩ is used instead of ⟨i ï⟩ after ⟨k g ch h⟩.
20. ⟨c dz s z⟩ and less frequently ⟨ć dź ś ź⟩ used instead of ⟨cz dż sz ż⟩.
21. ⟨ćï dźï śï źï⟩ used instead of ⟨czi dżi szi żi⟩.
22. ⟨rz⟩ is pronounced and used as in Standard Polish.
23. Standard Polish ⟨ni⟩ pronounced as /ɲj/ such as Dania are spelled ⟨ńj⟩ (Dańjå) and ⟨VV⟩ such as wyboisty is spelled ⟨VjV⟩ (wybojïsty). Otherwise ⟨j⟩ is as in Standard Polish.
24. Initial ⟨i u o⟩ in Standard Polish are pronounced and spelled as ⟨jï łu ło⟩ respectively; in Myszyniec initial ⟨a⟩ is spelled and pronounced as ⟨ła⟩.
25. The past tense of verbs whose stems end in consonants are spelled and pronounced with voiceless consonants, including those proceeded by personal clitics: mók, mókëm, mókeś.
26. Pre-existing loanwords are pronounced according to their historic realizations.
27. Loanwords containing ⟨pi bi⟩ should be adopted as ⟨pśï bźï⟩.
28. Loanwords containing ⟨fi wi mi⟩ should be adopted as ⟨fy wy my⟩.
29. Loanwords containing ⟨fiV wiV miV⟩ should be adopted as ⟨fjV wjV mjV⟩.
30. ⟨f w m⟩ when proceeded by an affix beginning with ⟨i⟩ in Standard polish should be changed to ⟨ś ź ń⟩.

=== Declension ===
Standardized Kurpian declension shows much levelling and regularization with regard to standard Polish declension.

==== Nouns ====
The genitive plural is formed with -ów in all genders, and replaces many standard masculine genitive plural endings as well with one exception - rok takes the suppletive genetive plural låt, but regular plural forms with the stem rok- can occur, and Rubach proscribes such forms. Similarly, all words taking -mi in the instrumental plural in standard Polish are regularized to -ańï. A few words in standard Polish take softening -ech in the locative plural, namely Niemcy (Niemczech), Węgry (Węgrzech), Włochy (Włoszech); these are regularized to hardening -ach: Ńëmcy||Ńëmcach.

===== Feminine declension =====
Rubach identifies a hard-stem feminine declension, a vocalic soft-stem declension, and a consonantal soft-stem declension as well as some irregular paradigms. The pressence of final -ë and -ó in the accusative and instrumental singular instead of -ę and -ą are the result of phonetic processes, as is the pressence of -óm instead of -om via prenasal raising in the dative plural and -ańï in the instrumental plural; -ów is seen instead of standard -∅ as the ending -ów sees much wider use in Kurpian in general.

- Hard-stem feminine nouns' stems end in the following consonants: p b f w m, s, z, t, d, n, r, ł, ch, k, and g.

Hard-stem feminine declension
Case	Singular	Plural
Nominative	kos-a (standard kosa)	kos-y (standard kosy)
Genitive	kos-y (standard kosy)	kos-ów (standard kos)
Dative	koś-e (standard kosie)	kos-óm (standard kosom)
Accusative	kos-ë (standard kosę)	kos-y (standard kosy)
Instrumental	kos-ó (standard kosą)	kos-ańï (standard kosami)
Locative	koś-e (standard kosie)	kos-ach (standard kosach)
Vocative	kos-o (standard koso)	kos-y (standard kosy)

- If the stem ends in a labial consonant (p, b, f, w, m), then regular phonetic processes, i.e. decomposition, occur in the dative and locative singular:

Hard-stem feminine declension
Case	Singular	Plural
Nominative	sop-a (standard szopa) bab-a (standard baba) saf-a (standard szafa) tråw-a (standard trawa) jam-a (standard jama)	sop-y (standard szopy) bab-y (standard baby) saf-y (standard szafy) tråw-y (standard trawy) jam-y (standard jamy)
Genitive	sop-y (standard szopy) bab-y (standard baby) saf-y (standard szafy) tråw-y (standard trawy) jam-y (standard jamy)	sop-ów (standard szop) bab-ów (standard bab) saf-ów (standard szaf) tråw-ów (standard traw) jam-ów (standard jam)
Dative	sopś-e (standard szopie) babź-e (standard babie) saś-e (standard szafie) tråź-e (standard trawie) jań-e (standard jamie)	sop-óm (standard szopom) bab-óm (standard babom) saf-óm (standard szafom) tråw-óm (standard trawom) jam-óm (standard jamom)
Accusative	sop-ë (standard szopę) bab-ë (standard babę) saf-ë (standard szafę) tråw-ë (standard trawę) jam-ë (standard jamę)	sop-y (standard szopy) bab-y (standard baby) saf-y (standard szafy) tråw-y (standard trawy) jam-y (standard jamy)
Instrumental	sop-ó (standard szopą) bab-ó (standard babą) saf-ó (standard szafą) tråw-ó (standard trawą) jam-ó (standard jamą)	sop-ańï (standard szopami) bab-ańï (standard babami) saf-ańï (standard szafami) tråw-ańï (standard trawami) jam-ańï (standard jamami)
Locative	sopś-e (standard szopie) babź-e (standard babie) saś-e (standard szafie) tråź-e (standard trawie) jań-e (standard jamie)	sop-ach (standard szopach) bab-ach (standard babach) saf-ach (standard szafach) tråw-ach (standard trawach) jam-ach (standard jamach)
Vocative	sop-o (standard szopo) bab-o (standard babo) saf-o (standard szafo) tråw-o (standard trawo) jam-o (standard jamo)	sop-y (standard szopy) bab-y (standard baby) saf-y (standard szafy) tråw-y (standard trawy) jam-y (standard jamy)

- Soft-stem feminine nouns stems' end in a soft consonant and in the nominative in -∅ (consonantal soft-stem), -a or -å (vocalic soft-stem); the main difference is that -y is in the genitive, dative, locative, and vocative singular and -ï in those same positions due to phonetic processes:

Soft-stem consonantal feminine declension
Case	Singular	Plural
Nominative	noc-∅ (standard noc) postać-∅ (standard postać)	noc-e (standard noce) postać-e (standard postacie)
Genitive	noc-y (standard nocy) postać-ï (standard postaci)	noc-ów (standard nocy) postać-ów (standard postaci)
Dative	noc-y (standard nocy) postać-ï (standard postaci)	noc-óm (standard nocom) postać-óm (standard postaciom)
Accusative	noc-∅ (standard noc) postać-∅ (standard postać)	noc-e (standard noce) postać-e (standard postacie)
Instrumental	noc-ó (standard nocą) postać-ó (standard postacią)	noc-ańï (standard nocami) postać-ańï (standard postaciami)
Locative	noc-y (standard nocy) postać-ï (standard postaci)	noc-ach (standard nocach) postać-ach (standard postaciach)
Vocative	noc-y (standard nocy) postać-ï (standard postaci)	noc-e (standard noce) postać-e (standard postacie)

- Some soft-stem feminine nouns stems' show -y and -ï in the nominative plural; most that do this show an alternative and much more common nominative/accusative/vocative plural according to the above paradigm (that is taking -e), but rzec and chę̈ć obligatorily take this ending:

Soft-stem consonantal feminine declension
Case	Singular	Plural
Nominative	rzec-∅ (standard rzecz) chę̈ć-∅ (standard chęć) kość-∅ (standard kość)	rzec-y (standard rzeczy) chę̈ć-ï (standard chęci) kość-ï or kość-e (standard kości)
Genitive	rzec-y (standard rzeczy) chę̈ć-ï (standard chęci) kość-ï (standard kości)	rzec-ów (standard rzeczy) chę̈ć-ów (standard chęci) kość-ów (standard kości)
Dative	rzec-y (standard rzeczy) chę̈ć-ï (standard chęci) kość-ï (standard kości)	rzec-óm (standard rzeczom) chę̈ć-óm (standard chęciom) kość-óm (standard kościom)
Accusative	rzec-∅ (standard rzecz) chę̈ć-∅ (standard chęć) kość-∅ (standard kość)	rzec-y (standard rzeczy) chę̈ć-ï (standard chęci) kość-ï or kość-e (standard kości)
Instrumental	rzec-ó (standard rzeczą) chę̈ć-ó (standard chęcią) kość-ó (standard kością)	rzec-ańï (standard rzeczami) chę̈ć-ańï (standard chęciami) kość-ańï (standard kościami)
Locative	rzec-y (standard rzeczy) chę̈ć-ï (standard chęci) kość-ï (standard kości)	rzec-ach (standard rzeczach) chę̈ć-ach (standard chęciach) kość-ach (standard kościach)
Vocative	rzec-y (standard rzeczy) chę̈ć-ï (standard chęci) kość-ï (standard kości)	rzec-y (standard rzeczy) chę̈ć-ï (standard chęci) kość-ï or kość-e (standard kości)

- The main difference in vocalic declension is the presence of either -a or -å in the nominative singular; -å tends to appear after l, ń, ś, ź, ć, dź, c, dz, s (< sz but not < s), z (<ż but not < z), rz, and j:

Soft-stem vocalic feminine declension
Case	Singular	Plural
Nominative	sukń-å (standard suknia) ńedz-a (standard miedza)	sukń-e (standard suknie) ńedz-e (standard miedze)
Genitive	sukń-ï (standard sukni) ńedz-y (standard miedzy)	sukń-ów (standard sukni or sukien) ńedz-ów (standard miedz)
Dative	sukń-ï (standard sukni) ńedz-y (standard miedzy)	sukń-óm (standard sukniom) ńedz-óm (standard miedzom)
Accusative	sukń-ë (standard suknię) ńedz-ë (standard miedzę)	sukń-e (standard suknie) ńedz-e (standard miedze)
Instrumental	sukń-ó (standard suknią) ńedz-ó (standard miedzą)	sukń-ańï (standard sukniami) ńedz-ańï (standard miedzami)
Locative	sukń-ï (standard sukni) ńedz-y (standard miedzy)	sukń-ach (standard sukniach) ńedz-ach (standard miedzach)
Vocative	sukń-o (standard suknio) ńedz-o (standard miedzo)	sukń-e (standard suknie) ńedz-e (standard miedze)

The term pańï has an irregular declension, but other terms ending in standard -yni/-ini, e.g. gospodyńå (standard gospodyni), are regularized to match the paradigm of sukńå:

pańï
Case	Singular	Plural
Nominative	pań-ï (standard pani)	pań-e (standard panie)
Genitive	pań-ï (standard pani)	pań-ów (standard pań)
Dative	pań-ï (standard pani)	pań-óm (standard paniom)
Accusative	pań-ó (standard panią)	pań-e (standard panie)
Instrumental	pań-ó (standard panią)	pań-ańï (standard paniami)
Locative	pań-ï (standard pani)	pań-ach (standard paniach)
Vocative	pań-ï (standard pani)	pań-e (standard panie)

The term mysz has been morphologically reshaped to mysa in the nominative singular and follows a hard declension (kosa) as opposed to a soft declension in the standard. Many other terms have undergone regularization, including pieśń to pśeśńå following the declension of sukńå and standard maź and wesz takes clear -a in the nominative as opposed to -å, thus måźa and wsa, despite being after a soft consonant, but otherwise declines like sukńå; wsa may otherwise fully regularize and decline according to the hard-stem paradigm. The term sansa (standard szansa) shows -e in the nominative plural despite being a hard-stem noun under standard influence.

The term rę̈ka in the meaning "arm, hand", like standard Polish ręka, (as well as neuter łoko (standard oko and łucho (standard ucho)) is irregular due to fossilizing dual forms in the plural; in other meanings it is regular. In the singular, it declines according to hard-stem declension, but the plural shows many irregularities; the instrumental form rę̈cómańï is the result of combining the old ending -oma with -ami with reglar sound changes applied; furthermore the plural stem rę̈c- appears in all cases due to morphological levelling.

rę̈ka
Case	Singular	Plural
Nominative	rę̈k-ï (standard ręka)	rę̈c-e (standard ręce)
Genitive	rę̈k-y (standard ręki)	rę̈c-ów (standard rąk)
Dative	rę̈c-e (standard ręce)	rę̈c-óm (standard rękom)
Accusative	rę̈k-ë (standard rękę)	rę̈c-e (standard ręce)
Instrumental	rę̈k-ó (standard ręką)	rę̈c-ańï or rę̈c-ómańï (standard rękami or rękoma)
Locative	rę̈c-e (standard ręce)	rę̈c-ach (standard rękach or ręku)
Vocative	ręk-o (standard ręko)	rę̈c-e (standard ręce)

===== Neuter declension =====
There are six neuter paradigms and no exceptions. As with feminine nouns, the hard-stem declension serves as the basic paradigm; hard stems may end in p, b, m, f, w, s, z, t, d, r, ł, and n; the velar consonants k, g, and ch belong to a different paradigm.

Hard-stem neuter declension
Case	Singular	Plural
Nominative	kopyt-o (standard kopyto)	kopyt-a (standard kopyta)
Genitive	kopyt-a (standard kopyta)	kopyt-ów (standard kopyt)
Dative	kopyt-oźu (Note: The ending -oźu is often replaced with standard -u, especially in a religious ocntext or with religious vocabulary, which is performed in standard Polish) (standard kopytu)	kopyt-óm (standard kopytom)
Accusative	kopyt-o (standard kopyto)	kopyt-a (standard kopyta)
Instrumental	kopyt-ëm (standard kopytem)	kopyt-ańï (standard kopytami)
Locative	kopyć-e (standard kopycie)	kopyt-ach (standard kopytach)
Vocative	kopyt-o (standard kopyto)	kopyt-a (standard kopyta)

- The locative singular -e can cause regular alternations of labials via sound laws, e.g. ńebo > ńebźe (standard niebie) or dynamo > dynańe (standard dynamie).
- Due to sound changes, Kurpian can show vowel alternations different than in standard Polish.

Neuter velar stems decline similarly to other hard-stem nouns, with a difference in the locative singular. See below for some -c stems that decline according to this paradigm.

Hard-stem velar (or some c-stem) neuter declension
Case	Singular	Plural
Nominative	łózk-o (standard łóżko)	łózk-a (standard łóżka)
Genitive	łózk-a (standard łóżka)	łózk-ów (standard łóżek)
Dative	łózk-oźu (standard łóżku)	łózk-óm (standard łóżkom)
Accusative	łózk-o (standard łóżko)	łózk-a (standard łóżka)
Instrumental	łózk-ëm (standard łóżkiem)	łózk-ańï (standard łóżkami)
Locative	łózk-u (standard łóżku)	łózk-ach (standard łóżkach)
Vocative	łózk-o (standard łóżko)	łózk-a (standard łóżka)

Soft stems may end in ś, ź, ć, dź, ń, j, c, dz, s (< sz but not < s), z (< ż but not < z), rz, and l; j-stems (e.g. jajo, radjo) take -o in the nominative/accusative/vocative singular instead of -e

Soft-stem neuter declension
Case	Singular	Plural
Nominative	dań-e (standard danie)	dań-a (standard dania)
Genitive	dań-å (standard dania)	dań-ów (standard dań)
Dative	dań-u (standard daniu)	dań-óm (standard daniom)
Accusative	dań-e (standard danie)	dań-a (standard dania)
Instrumental	dań-ëm (standard daniem)	dań-ańï (standard daniami)
Locative	dań-u (standard daniu)	dań-ach (standard daniom)
Vocative	dań-e (standard daniu)	dań-a (standard dania)

Some nouns whose stems end in -c (< -c, not < -cz) may show some differences to the above paradigm: jajo, radjo) take -o in the nominative/accusative/vocative singular instead of -e.

Soft-stem c-stem neuter declension
Case	Singular	Plural
Nominative	sérc-e (standard serce) płóc-o (standard płuco) słóńc-e (standard słońce)	sérc-a (standard serca) płóc-a (standard płuca) słóńc-a (standard słońca)
Genitive	sérc-a (standard serca) płóc-a (standard płuca) słóńc-a (standard słońca)	sérc-ów (standard serc) płóc-ów (standard płuc) słóńc-ów (standard słońc)
Dative	sérc-oźu (standard sercu) płóc-oźu (standard płucu) słóńc-oźu (standard słońcu)	sérc-óm (standard sercom) płóc-óm (standard płucom) słóńc-óm (standard słońcom)
Accusative	sérc-e (standard serce) płóc-o (standard płuco) słóńc-e (standard słońce)	sérc-a (standard serca) płóc-a (standard płuca) słóńc-a (standard słońca)
Instrumental	sérc-ëm (standard sercem) płóc-ëm (standard płucem) słóńc-ëm (standard słońcem)	sérc-ańï (standard sercami) płóc-ańï (standard płucami) słóńc-ańï (standard słońcami)
Locative	sérc-u (standard sercu) płóc-u (standard płucu) słóńc-u (standard słońcu)	sérc-ach (standard sercach) płóc-ach (standard płucach) słóńc-ach (standard słońcach)
Vocative	sérc-e (standard serce) płóc-o (standard płuco) słóńc-e (standard słońce)	sérc-a (standard serca) płóc-a (standard płuca) słóńc-a (standard słońca)

- These terms unexpectedly take -a instead of -å in the genitive singular and -oźu instead of -u in the dative singular, thus declining like velar stems and belonging to that paradigm; such -c stems usually end in -e in the nominative singular. This does not apply to c-stems deriving from -cz-, e.g. poboce (< pobocze).

Nasal stem nouns constitute a closed class and no new terms enter this paradigm. Other standard Polish nasal stems taking -ć- in the singular and -t- in the plural (cielę, genitive singular cielęcia, genitive plural cieląt) do not occur and instead the suffix -åk in the nominative singular is used, see below for more.

Nasal stem neuter declension
Case	Singular	Plural
Nominative	wyńë (standard wymię) rëńë (standard ramię) jïńë (standard imię) strzëńë (standard strzemię)	wyńón-a (standard wymiona) rëńón-a (standard ramimona) jïńón-a (standard imiona) strzëńón-a (standard strzemiona)
Genitive	wyńëń-å (standard wymienia) rëńëń-å (standard ramienia) jïńëń-å (standard imienia) strzëńëń-å (standard strzemienia)	wyńón-ów (standard wymion) rëńón-ów (standard ramion) jïńón-ów (standard imion) strzëńón-ów (standard strzemion)
Dative	wyńëń-u (standard wymieniu) rëńëń-u (standard ramieniu) jïńëń-u (standard imieniu) strzëńëń-u (standard strzemieniu)	wyńón-óm (standard wymionom) rëńón-óm (standard ramoniom) jïńón-óm (standard imionom) strzëńón-óm (standard strzemionom)
Accusative	wyńë (standard wymię) rëńë (standard ramię) jïńë (standard imię) strzëńë (standard strzemię)	wyńón-a (standard wymiona) rëńón-a (standard ramimona) jïńón-a (standard imiona) strzëńón-a (standard strzemiona)
Instrumental	wyńëń-ëm (standard wymieniem) rëńëń-ëm (standard ramieniem) jïńëń-ëm (standard imieniem) strzëńëń-ëm (standard strzemieniem)	wyńón-ańï (standard wymionami) rëńón-ańï (standard ramionami) jïńón-ańï (standard imionami) strzëńón-ańï (standard strzemionami)
Locative	wyńëń-u (standard wymieniu) rëńëń-u (standard ramieniu) jïńëń-u (standard imieniu) strzëńëń-u (standard strzemieniu)	wyńón-ach (standard wymionach) rëńón-ach (standard ramionach) jïńón-ach (standard imionach) strzëńón-ach (standard strzemionach)
Vocative	wyńë (standard wymię) rëńë (standard ramię) jïńë (standard imię) strzëńë (standard strzemię)	wyńón-a (standard wymiona) rëńón-a (standard ramimona) jïńón-a (standard imiona) strzëńón-a (standard strzemiona)

Latinate words ending in -um in the nominative singular behave very similar to standard Polish:

Latinate neuter declension
Case	Singular	Plural
Nominative	gymnazj-um (standard gimnazjum)	gymnazj-a (standard gimnazja)
Genitive	gymnazj-um (standard gimnazjum)	gymnazj-ów (standard gimnazjów)
Dative	gymnazj-um (standard gimnazjum)	gymnazj-óm (standard gimnazjom)
Accusative	gymnazj-um (standard gimnazjum)	gymnazj-a (standard gimnazja)
Instrumental	gymnazj-um (standard gimnazjum)	gymnazj-ańï (standard gimnazjami)
Locative	gymnazj-um (standard gimnazjum)	gymnazj-ach (standard gimnazjach)
Vocative	gymnazj-um (standard gimnazjum)	gymnazj-a (standard gimnazja)

The words łoko (standard oko) and łucho (standard ucho), much like rę̈ka (see above), show irregular plural forms fossilized from old dual forms when in the meanings "eye" and "ear" respectively; in other contexts they are regular:

Latinate neuter declension
Case	Singular	Plural
Nominative	łok-o (standard oko) łuch-o (standard ucho)	łoc-y (standard oczy) łus-y (standard uszy)
Genitive	łok-a (standard oka) łuch-a (standard ucha)	łoc-ów (standard oczu or ócz or oczów) łus-ów (standard uszu or uszów)
Dative	łok-u (standard oku) łuch-u (standard uchu)	łoc-óm (standard oczom) łus-óm (standard uszom)
Accusative	łok-o (standard oko) łuch-o (standard ucho)	łoc-y (standard oczy) łus-y (standard uszy)
Instrumental	łok-ëm (standard okiem) łuch-ëm (standard uchem)	łoc-ańï (standard oczami or oczyma) łus-ańï (standard uszami or uszyma)
Locative	łok-u (standard oku) łuch-u (standard uchu)	łoc-ach (standard oczach) łus-ach (standard uszach)
Vocative	łok-o (standard oko) łuch-o (standard ucho)	łoc-y (standard oczy) łus-y (standard uszy)

===== Masculine declension =====
Standard Kurpian may retain the three-way animacy distinction found in standard Polish, whereby the accusative singular and/or plural shows syncretism with the genitive, but differs from standard Polish in the nominative plural, as only non-softening -y occurs, never standard -owie or softening -i-/y, e.g. standard szeryf || szeryfowie but Kurpian seryf || seryfy, and non-softening -y can even occur after the velar consonants k/g due to historic sound laws; softening -i/-y can sporadically be heard, but Rubach proscribes these forms. In the nominative plural of masculine nouns ending in -c, inanimate nouns take -e and animate nouns take -y; in Kurpian only -e occurs; -e also replaces standard Polish -owie or for nouns ending in -ć (e.g. śmieć). In standard Polish, the dative singular may be formed with -owi or less frequently -u; in standard Kurpian these two forms are combined into -oźu which is the only ending for the dative singular, except Bóg, which like standard Polish takes the dative singular form Bogu due to its religious semantics. Bóg also constitutes an exception in the vocative singular for similar reasons and is formed as Boże; all other velar stem nouns take -u due to levelling and regularization.

- Hard-stem masculine nouns show -a in the genitive singular more often than in standard Polish, but the usage of -a or -u in Kurpian remains somewhat unpredictable. Like standard Polish, masculine animal and masculine personal nouns take -a.

Hard-stem masculine declension (inanimate)
Case	Singular	Plural
Nominative	płot-∅ (standard płot)	płot-y (standard płoty)
Genitive	płot-a (standard płota or płotu)	płot-ów (standard płotów)
Dative	płot-oźu (standard płotowi)	płot-óm (standard płotom)
Accusative	płot-∅ (standard płot)	płot-y (standard płoty)
Instrumental	płot-ëm (standard płotem)	płot-ańï (standard płotami)
Locative	płoć-e (standard płocie)	płot-ach (standard płotach)
Vocative	płoć-e (standard płocie)	płot-y (standard płoty)

- Velar stems take -u in the locative and vocative singular.

Hard-stem velar masculine declension (inanimate)
Case	Singular	Plural
Nominative	krzåk-∅ (standard krzak) dług-∅ (standard dług) mech-∅ (standard mech)	krzåk-y (standard krzaki) dług-y (standard długi) mech-y (standard mchy)
Genitive	krzåk-a (standard krzaka or krzaku) dług-u (standard długu) mech-u (standard mchu)	krzåk-ów (standard krzaków) dług-ów (standard długów) mech-ów (standard mchów)
Dative	krzåk-oźu (standard krzakowi) dług-oźu (standard długowi) mech-oźu (standard mchowi)	krzåk-óm (standard krzakom) dług-óm (standard długom) mech-óm (standard mchom)
Accusative	krzåk-∅ (standard krzak) dług-∅ (standard dług) mech-∅ (standard mech)	krzåk-y (standard krzaki) dług-y (standard długi) mech-y (standard mchy)
Instrumental	krzåk-ëm (standard krzakiem) dług-ëm (standard długiem) mech-ëm (standard mchem)	krzåk-ańï (standard krzakami) dług-ańï (standard długami) mech-ańï (standard mchami)
Locative	krzåk-u (standard krzaku) dług-u (standard długu) mech-u (standard mchu)	krzåk-ach (standard krzakach) dług-ach (standard długach) mech-ach (standard mchach)
Vocative	krzåk-u (standard krzak) dług-u (standard długu) mech-u (standard mchu)	krzåk-y (standard krzaki) dług-y (standard długi) mech-y (standard mchy)

- Soft-stem masculine declension takes -e in the nominative plural as opposed to -y in hard declension and -u in the locative sinuglar as opposed to hard-stem -e.

Soft-stem masculine declension (inanimate)
Case	Singular	Plural
Nominative	korzëń-∅ (standard korzeń) kyj-∅ (standard kij) korål-∅ (standard koral) påćérz-∅ (standard pacierz) ńeśądz-∅ (standard miesiąc)	korzëń-e (standard korzenie) kyj-e (standard kije) korål-e (standard korale) påćérz-e (standard pacierze) ńeśądz-e (standard miesiące)
Genitive	korzëń-a (standard korzenia) kyj-a (standard kija) korål-a (standard korala or koralu) påćérz-a (standard pacierza) ńeśądz-a (standard miesiąca)	korzëń-ów (standard korzeni) kyj-ów (standard kijów) korål-ów (standard korali) påćérz-ów (standard pacierzy) ńeśądz-ów (standard miesięcy)
Dative	korzëń-oźu (standard korzeniowi) kyj-oźu (standard kijowi) korål-oźu (standard koralowi) påćérz-oźu (standard pacierzowi) ńeśądz-oźu (standard miesiącowi)	korzëń-óm (standard korzeniom) kyj-óm (standard kijom) korål-óm (standard koralom) påćérz-óm (standard pacierzom) ńeśądz-óm (standard miesiącom)
Accusative	korzëń-∅ (standard korzeń) kyj-∅ (standard kij) korål-∅ (standard koral) påćérz-∅ (standard pacierz) ńeśądz-∅ (standard miesiąc)	korzëń-e (standard korzenie) kyj-e (standard kije) korål-e (standard korale) påćérz-e (standard pacierze) ńeśądz-e (standard miesiące)
Instrumental	korzëń-ëm (standard korzeniem) kyj-ëm (standard kijem) korål-ëm (standard koralem) påćérz-ëm (standard pacierzem) ńeśądz-ëm (standard miesiącem)	korzëń-ańï (standard korzeniami) kyj-ańï (standard kijami) korål-ańï (standard koralami) påćérz-ańï (standard pacierzami) ńeśądz-ańï (standard miesiącami)
Locative	korzëń-u (standard korzeniu) kyj-u (standard kiju) korål-u (standard koralu) påćérz-u (standard pacierzu) ńeśądz-u (standard miesiącu)	korzëń-ach (standard korzeniach) kyj-ach (standard kijach) korål-ach (standard koralu) påćérz-ach (standard pacierzach) ńeśądz-ach (standard miesiącach)
Vocative	korzëń-u (standard korzeniu) kyj-u (standard kiju) korål-u (standard koralu) påćérz-u (standard pacierzu) ńeśądz-u (standard miesiącu)	korzëń-e (standard korzenie) kyj-e (standard kije) korål-e (standard korale) påćérz-e (standard pacierze) ńeśądz-e (standard miesiące)

- Standard Polish nouns ending in -anin, e.g. poganin are morphologically levelled to -an and take hard-stem declension in Kurpian.
- Nouns ending in -ans in standard Polish may take either non-softening -e or -y or both in the nominative plural; in Kurpian these are regularized to hard-stem declensions.
- In standard Polish, the word brat shows suppletion in its plural forms; in Kurpian it declines according to hard-stem personal declension. Similarly, kśądz (standard ksiądz) is regularized to a soft-stem declension with an oblique stem kśę̈dz-. Standard książę (oblique singular stem księci- andp plural książ-) are levelled in Kurpian to soft-stem declension with the stem kśę̈ć and no oblique stem.
- The term bóg, however, undergoes regular hard-stem declension.
- The terms pan and syn are regularized to personal hard-stem declension; their nominative plural may be formed with -oźe under influence of standard Polish, but -y also occurs.
- Nouns ending in -s, -z, -c, and -dz take hard-stem declension if they are not the result of masuration, e.g. sołtys; if they are the result of masuration, e.g. lystonos < listonosz, they take soft-stem declension; however such nouns are sometimes reanalyzed to be hard-stem, e.g. wę̈zu||wę̈źe (standard wężu; these forms are usually alternative to soft-stem declension, except kos (kosz) and kamas (standard kamasz), which regularly take hard-stem declension. An example of a word undergoing this transition from soft-stem to hard-stem declension is źérs (standard wiersz), which is inflected by some with soft declension and by others with hard. Rubach proscribes mixed declension for nouns ending in -s, -z, -c, and -dz, particularly the mixing of the nominative plural endings and locative singular, e.g. gros||grose||grośe}} (instead of prescribed grosu).
- Animate masculine nouns ending in -a in the nominative singular, e.g. starosta, wojewoda take their corresponding hard-stem or soft-stem feminine declension, except in the accusative plural, which shows syncretism with the genitive plural and takes -ów, whereas feminine nouns in the accusative plural show syncretism with the nominative plural and take -y (hard-stem) or -e (soft-stem); this includes the nouns sę̈dźå (standard sędzia and hrabźå (standard hrabia).

====== Morphophonological alternations ======
The nasal vowel ą alternates with ę̈ in most of the same positions and words as it ą alternates with ę in standard Polish.

In terms of oral vowels, Kurpian has three slanted vowels, ó, é, å which may or may not alternate with their clear (non-slanted) varaiants o, e, a, depending on the etymological origins of these vowels, see History of the Polish language#Vowel length and clear vs slanted vowels. In general, clear vowels become slanted tautosyllabically before non-voiceless consonants (b, d, g, w, z, ź, dz, dź, rz, m, n, ń, l, r, ł, j), and o becomes ó, e becomes ë, and å (but not a) becomes ó via o (thus giving alternations of ó||a) always before nasal consonants; the distribution of morphophonologically slanted vowels also differs from standard Polish., 124} This alternation occurs primarily in masculine declension, which is the only declension to take -∅ (in the nominative singular); historically in Polish this could also occur in the feminine and neuter which take -∅ in the genitive plural, but these positions take -ów in Kurpian; however soft-stem feminine declension may show these alternations as the nominative singular may end in -∅. These alternations are akin to standard Polish vocalic alternations of ó and o, but affecting also é||e and å||a. Slanted é does not appear before a syllable-final voiced consonant if it originates from mobile e arising from the loss of yers. These morphophonological process may also occur in loanwords.

==== Adjectives ====
Kurpian does not have a special adjectival form for masculine personal nouns: dobre Francuzy (standard dobrzy Francuzi, however, the three animacy distinction is kept as synchronism between the accusative and genitive still occurs in different ways depending on the animacy of the referent. As a result, all genders share a plural paradigm, save differences in animacy. Kurpian has hard and soft declension like standard Polish; Rubach does not consider soft declension a separate paradigm as he considers the appearance of -ï predictable based on sound laws (i.e. appearing after certain soft consonants). Hard declension occurs more often in Kurpian, as do short forms. Notably, considering that velar consonants did not soften, velar declension is absent and velar-stem adjectives decline according to the hard-stem paradigm. Short forms are formed with -∅ and occur in the masculine nominative singular, in other genders the typical endings are used; -∅ may cause slanting as in nominal declension and may also cause the appearance of mobile -e- (written ⟨ë⟩ before nasal consonants). Short adjectives occur quite often in the form of possessive adjectives formed with -ów and -ïn/-yn (båbcyn wnuk, "grandmother's grandson"), wujów kapelus, "uncle's hat"). Long masculine forms for these possessive adjectives do not occur. As in standard Polish, some adjectives are nominalized, but these take adjectival declension.

Hard-stem adjectives end in p, b, m, f, w, s (< s), z (< z), t, d, n, r, ł, k, g, and ch. Soft declension occurs after stems ending in ś, ź, ć, dź, ń, and j.

Hard-stem adjectival declension
Case	Singular				Plural	
Case	Masculine animate	Masculine inanimate	Neuter	Feminine	Masculine animate	Non-masculine animate
Nominative/Vocative	dobry		dobre	dobrå	dobre	
Genitive	dobrégo			dobréj	dobréch	
Dative	dobrëmu			dobréj	dobrëm	
Accusative	dobrégo	dobry	dobre	dobró	dobréch	dobre
Instrumental	dobrëm			dobró	dobrëńï	
Locative	dobrëm			dobréj	dobréch	

Soft-stem adjectival declension
Case	Singular				Plural	
Case	Masculine animate	Masculine inanimate	Neuter	Feminine	Masculine animate	Non-masculine animate
Nominative/Vocative	głupśï		głupśe	głupśå	głupśe	
Genitive	głupśégo			głupśéj	głupśéch	
Dative	głupśëmu			głupśéj	głupśëm	
Accusative	głupśégo	głupśï	głupśe	głupśó	głupśéch	głupśe
Instrumental	głupśëm			głupśó	głupśëńï	
Locative	głupśëm			głupśéj	głupśéch	

- Kurpian retains more instances of slanted é.
- The dative-instrumental masculine-neuter ending -ëm derives from Old Polish -em, as opposed to standard Polish -ym < Old Polish -ym.
- The instrumental plural ending -ëńï derives from Old Polish -emi, as opposed to standard Polish -ymi < Old Polish < -ymi.

==== Pronouns ====
Many Kurpian pronouns and pronoun forms are the result of regular historic sound changes with few innovations. The usage of reduced forms (i.e. dative mu instead of jëmu) is similar to the usage of standard Polish, i.e. in unaccented positions; forms beginning with ń occur after a preposition, as in standard Polish. One innovation among personal pronouns is the introduction of łóny as a personal feminine plural pronoun; standard Polish differentiates between virile (i.e. personal) oni and non-virile (non-personal) one; in Kurpian łóńï is the masculine personal plural pronoun (for a group containing at least one masculine human referent), łóny is the feminine plural pronoun (for a group of human feminine referents) and łóne is for a group of non-human referents; animal referents that are grammatically feminine do not use łóny. Rubach states that the distribution of dative nóm/nóma and wóm/wóma versus naju and waju is unclear.

Declension of personal pronouns
Case	First person		Second Person		Third Person					
Case	Singular	Plural	Singular	Plural	Singular			Plural		
Case	Singular	Plural	Singular	Plural	Masculine	Feminine	Neuter	Masculine personal	Feminine personal	Non-personal
Nominative	jå	my	ty	wy	łón	łóna	łóno	łóńï	łóny	łóne
Genitive	mńe	nas	ćebźe	was	ńégo, ńégo, go	jéj, ńéj	ńégo, ńégo, go	jéch, ńéch		
Dative	mńe, ńï	nóm, nóma, naju	tobźe, ćï	wóm, wóma, waju	jëmu, ńëmu, mu	jéj, ńéj	jëmu, ńëmu, mu	jëm, ńëm		
Accusative	mńe, më	nas	ćebźe, ćë	was	ńégo, ńégo, go	jó, ńó	ńégo, ńégo, go	jéch, ńéch		
Instrumental	mnó	nańï	tobó	wańï	ńëm	ńó	ńëm	ńëńï		
Locative	mńe	nas	tobźe	was	ńëm	ńéj	ńëm	ńéch		

The possessive pronouns mój, twój, swój, nas (standard nasz), was (standard wasz), and cyj (standard czyj) in Kurpian are similar standard Polish, but with appropriate sound laws and also take adjectival declension with the exception that the feminine nomative-vocative singular is formed with -a as opposed to -å. Other determinative pronouns, e.g. łów (standard ów) take adjectival declension; the indeterminate endings -ś and -kolźek (standard -kolwiek), as in standard Polish, are not declined, and instead the root they are attached to declines.

The determinative pronouns tën (standard ten) and sóm (standard sam) take adjectival declension, except that the nominative-vocative feminine singular is formed with -a, the nominative-vocative neuter singular is levelled to -e (standard -o), and the accusative feminine singular is levelled to -ó (<-ą) (standard -ę, colloquially -ą); the masculine nominative plural is te and same regardless of animacy and ci and sami does not occur, and due to adjectival levelling, -i occurs nowhere.

Declension of chto, ńïcht, cóś, ńïc (singulare tantum)
Nominative	chto	ńïcht	cóś	ńïc
Genitive	kogo	ńïkogo, ńïkogój	cegóś	ńïcégo
Dative	kómu	ńïkómu	cëmu	ńïcëmu
Accusative	kogo	ńïkogo	cóś	ńïcégo
Instrumental	këm	ńïkëm	cëm	ńïcëm
Locative	këm	ńïkëm	cëm	ńïcëm

==== Numerals ====
Ordinal numerals take adjectival declension with no differences. The numeral jedën (standard jeden declines like a possessive pronoun.

The numeral dwa does not show masculine personal forms in the nominative, i.e. standard dwaj; the genitive form dwu is retained from Old Polish, and the form dwóch does not occur; Rubach prescribes the dative form dwu over dwóm; the locative form dwóch does not occur; separate feminine forms, e.g. dwie, dwiema do not occur. The numerals łobydwa (standard obydwa) and łoba (standard oba) decline according to this paradigm.

Declension of dwa
Nominative/Vocative	dwa (chłopy, krowy, pola)
Genitive	dwu (chłopów, krowów, polów)
Dative	dwu/dwóm (chłopóm, krowóm, polóm)
Accusative	= nom (non-masculine personal) or = gen (masculine personal)
Instrumental	dwóma (chłopańï, krowańï, polańï)
Locative	dwu (chłopach, krowach, polach)

The numerals trzy and śtéry (standard cztery) also do not show different forms for gender; masculine personal nouns may facultatively use genitive trzech, śtéréch and the genitive plural form of the noun in the nominative (e.g. trzech pśékårzów sło drogó, standard trzech piekarzy/piekarzów szło drogą), similar to standard Polish, however, unlike standard Polish, the personal forms trzech and czterej do not occur.

Declension of trzy and śtéry
Nominative/Vocative	trzy, śtéry
Genitive	trzech, śtéréch
Dative	trzóm, śtéróm
Accusative	= nom (non-masculine personal) or = gen (masculine personal)
Instrumental	trzóma, śtéróma
Locative	trzech, śtéréch

The numerals pśę̈ć (standard pięć), ̈seść (standard sześć), ̈śedëm (standard siedem), ̈łośëm (standard osiem), ̈dźeźę̈ć (standard dziewięć), and ̈dześę̈ć (standard dziesięć) decline like dwa with the only difference being that the dative is formed with -u, and the ending -óm does not occur; furthermore, the instrumental is formed with -u, not -oma.{{lag.

Declension of pśęć
Nominative/Vocative	pśęć
Genitive	pśęću
Dative	pśęću
Accusative	= nom (non-masculine personal) or = gen (masculine personal)
Instrumental	pśęću
Locative	pśęću

=== Conjugation ===
Forms not mentioned are the same as in standard Polish. The anterior adverbial participle is generally formed from perfective verbs. Like standard Polish, Kurpian does not require the usage of pronouns for corresponding verb forms.

The second person plural ending -eće as an ending of formality and may be used to a singular listener, despite being grammatically plural; -eta is the neutral second person plural ending. The pressence of å in past tense masculine singular forms is the result of slanting a before a tautosyllabic liquid; its lack in personal forms is the result of the fact -m and -ś are clitics and attach to other words more often in standard Polish and is even more natural than attaching the clitics to the verb; in some regions -ëm and -eś can appear as separate words: ëm robźół, eś robźół (standard robiłem, robiłeś).

The ending -źwa in the first person plural past tense is used for a repeating or distant past. The second person plural past tense endings -śta and -śće show a similar distribution to -eće and -eta in the present tense, that is -śće is used for forms of respect.

Passive adjectival participles take adjectival declension; the active adjectival participle may also be formed, e.g. losujący and also takes adjectival declension.

The verbs brać and prać are levelled, first person singular present tense bźerzë, pźerzë (standard biorę, piorę.

The verbs mléć and mléć show the past forms nół(-) and pśół(-) (standard mełł(-), pełł(-) in the masculine singular and ńołł(-), pśołł(-) elsewhere. However, they may also be levelled to class II conjugation and take the infinitive forms neléć and pśeléć (standard mielić, pielić.

The imperfectivizing suffix -ać, which takes class class VI conjugation, causes slanting of e, a, and o to é, å, and å respectively, e.g. strzeléć > strzélać, kłaść > przekłådać, and wyprośéc > wypråsać, and this slanted vowel remains throughout the paradigm.

==== Class I ====
The distribution of the stems -owa and -uj is similar to that in standard Polish. The anterior adverbial participle always shows slanted å before -wsy.

Class I verbs (-owa stems)
Present tense	Person	Singular			Plural		
Present tense	I person	(jå) losuj-ë			(my) losuj-ëm		
Present tense	II person	(ty) losuj-es			(wy) losuj-eta or (wy) losuj-eće		
Present tense	III person	(łón, łóna, łóno) losuj-e			(łóńï, łóny, łóne) losuj-ó		
Past tense	Person	Singular			Plural		
Past tense	Person	Masculine	Feminine	Neuter	Masculine	Feminine	Neuter
Past tense	I person	(jå) losowå-ł-ëm	(jå) losowa-ł-a-m	N/A	(my) losowa-l-y-m or (my) losowa-l-y-źwa	(my) losowa-ł-y-m or (my) losowa-ł-y-źwa	N/A
Past tense	II person	(ty) losowå-ł-eś	(ty) losowa-ł-a-ś	N/A	(wy) losowa-l-y-śta or (wy) losowa-l-y-śće	(wy) losowa-ł-y-śta or (wy) losowa-ł-y-śće	N/A
Past tense	III person	(łón) losowå-ł-∅	(łóna) losowa-ł-a	(łóno) losowa-ł-o	(łóńï) losowa-l-y	(łóny) losowa-ł-y	(łóne) losowa-ł-y
Participles	Passive adjectival participle	Singular			Plural		
Participles	Passive adjectival participle	Masculine	Feminine	Neuter	Plural		
Participles	Passive adjectival participle	(wy)losowa-n-y	(wy)losowa-n-å	(wy)losowa-n-e	(wy)losowa-n-e		
Participles	Contemporary adverbial participle	losuj-ąc					
Participles	Anterior adverbial participle	wylosowå-wsy					

==== Class II ====
Rubach sets -ï stems (standard -i stems) as class II, and distinguishes four subclasses:

1. IIa - roots ending in the alveolar and dental consonants s (including st), z (including zd), t, and d; these consonants may alternate with consonants other than the alternations found in standard Polish due to historic sound changes;
2. IIb - roots ending in the labial and labiodental consonants p, b, m, f, and w, alternating respectively with pś, bź, ń, ś, and ź due to historic sound changes;
3. IIc - roots ending in the sonorants n, ł, l, r, and j; alternations include n||ń, ł||l, and r||rz;
4. IId - roots ending in the velar consonants k (including sk), g (including zg), and ch; alternations include (s)k||(s)c, (z)g||(z)dz, and ch||s, each being the result of historic sound changes.

-ï stem verbs form the infinitive with -éć due to historic sound changes, e.g. głos - głoś-é-ć; despite this, they are not -é stems, which take a different paradigm, e.g. głoś-é-ć (standard głosić)||głoś-ó-ł (standard głosił, but źïś-é-ć (standard wisieć||źïś-å-ł (standard wisiał). This lowering of ï to é near ć only when -ï- is not part of the stem; e.g. pśïć (standard pić has the stemp pśï-, thus *pśéć does not occur, whereas głośéć has the stem głoś-. Furthermore, the anterior adverbial participle is formed with -ï-.

The past tense shows either -ó- or -é- in a distribution similar to the distribution of -å- and -a- in class I; regionally, i.e. not in central Kurpie, -ï- may occur instead of -é-, e.g. głośïly instead of central głośély. This -ó- may be further raised to -u- in non-central Kurpian.

Subclasses IIc forms some present tense forms and the anterior adverbial participle with -y- instead of -ï- due to orthographical rules, thus wyśkolywsy.

Subclass IId shows some differences from IIa, e.g. IId straséć, strasë, strasys, strasół, straséła (standard straszyć straszysz, straszysz, straszył, straszyła) as opposed to głośéć, głosë, głośïs, głośoł, glośéła (standard głosić, głoszę, głosisz, głosił, głosiła) in the use of endings and alternations due to historic sound changes such as masuration.

Class II (IIa) verbs (-ï stems)
Present tense	Person	Singular			Plural		
Present tense	I person	(jå) głos-ë			(my) głoś-ëm		
Present tense	II person	(ty) głoś-ïs			(wy) głoś-ïta or (wy) głoś-ïće		
Present tense	III person	(łón, łóna, łóno) głoś-ï			(łóńï, łóny, łóne) głos-ó		
Past tense	Person	Singular			Plural		
Past tense	Person	Masculine	Feminine	Neuter	Masculine	Feminine	Neuter
Past tense	I person	(jå) głoś-ó-ł-ëm	(jå) głoś-é-ł-a-m	N/A	(my) głoś-é-l-y-m or (my) głoś-é-l-y-źwa	(my) głoś-é-ł-y-m or (my) głoś-é-ł-y-źwa	N/A
Past tense	II person	(ty) głoś-ó-ł-eś	(ty) głoś-é-ł-a-ś	N/A	(wy) głoś-é-l-y-śta or (wy) głoś-é-l-y-śće	(wy) głoś-é-ł-y-śta or (wy) głoś-é-ł-y-śće	N/A
Past tense	III person	(łón) głoś-ó-ł-∅	(łóna) głoś-é-ł-a	(łóno) głoś-é-ł-o	(łóńï) głoś-é-l-y	(łóny) głoś-é-ł-y	(łóne) głoś-é-ł-y
Participles	Passive adjectival participle	Singular			Plural		
Participles	Passive adjectival participle	Masculine	Feminine	Neuter	Plural		
Participles	Passive adjectival participle	(wy)głos-ón-y	(wy)głos-ón-å	(wy)głos-ón-e	(wy)głos-ón-e		
Participles	Contemporary adverbial participle	głos-ąc					
Participles	Anterior adverbial participle	wygłoś-ï-wsy					

==== Class III ====
Class III comprises -e stem verbs and conjugates the same as class II in the present tense; however, past tense forms differ: muśåł, muśała, muśely (standard musiał, musiała, musieli). This class contains verbs whose roots are extended with -e, e.g. myśl-é-ć as opposed to verbs containing -e- in the root, e .g. pléś-ć; this class does not contain -ej stem verbs, which take a different present tense conjugation. Similar to class II, the infinitive is formed with -éć. The distribution of å||a in past tense forms is identical to that found in class I verbs, and the passive adjectival participle and anterior adverbial participle are formed identically to class I verbs.

Class III verbs (-e stems)
Present tense	Person	Singular			Plural		
Present tense	I person	(jå) źïdz-ë			(my) źïdź-ëm		
Present tense	II person	(ty) źïdź-ïs			(wy) źïdź-ïta or (wy) źïdź-ïće		
Present tense	III person	(łón, łóna, łóno) źïdź-ï			(łóńï, łóny, łóne) źïdz-ó		
Past tense	Person	Singular			Plural		
Past tense	Person	Masculine	Feminine	Neuter	Masculine	Feminine	Neuter
Past tense	I person	(jå) źïdź-å-ł-ëm	(jå) źïdź-a-ł-a-m	N/A	(my) źïdź-e-l-y-m or (my) źïdź-e-l-y-źwa	(my) źïdź-a-ł-y-m or (my) źïdź-a-ł-y-źwa	N/A
Past tense	II person	(ty) źïdź-å-ł-eś	(ty) źïdź-a-ł-a-ś	N/A	(wy) źïdź-e-l-y-śta or (wy) źïdź-e-l-y-śće	(wy) źïdź-a-ł-y-śta or (wy) źïdź-a-ł-y-śće	N/A
Past tense	III person	(łón) źïdź-å-ł-∅	(łóna) źïdź-a-ł-a	(łóno) źïdź-a-ł-o	(łóńï) źïdź-e-l-y	(łóny) źïdź-a-ł-y	(łóne) źïdź-a-ł-y
Participles	Passive adjectival participle	Singular			Plural		
Participles	Passive adjectival participle	Masculine	Feminine	Neuter	Plural		
Participles	Passive adjectival participle	źïdź-an-y	źïdź-an-å	źïdź-an-e	źïdź-an-e		
Participles	Contemporary adverbial participle	źïdz-ąc					
Participles	Anterior adverbial participle	źïdź-å-wsy					

==== Class IV ====
Class IV verbs differ from previous classes in the present stem, taking -ej-, and personal endings are formed with -e as opposed to -ï; these are also called -ej- stem verbs. This class of verbs is intransitive and never forms passive adjectival participles, however, forms with -ły may occur as adjectives, e.g. wyłyśały. Forms where -ej- does not appear are analogous to class III conjugation.

Class IV verbs (-ej stems)
Present tense	Person	Singular			Plural		
Present tense	I person	(jå) łyśej-ë			(my) łyśej-ëm		
Present tense	II person	(ty) łyśej-es			(wy) łyśej-eta or (wy) łyśej-eće		
Present tense	III person	(łón, łóna, łóno) łyśej-e			(łóńï, łóny, łóne) łyśej-ó		
Past tense	Person	Singular			Plural		
Past tense	Person	Masculine	Feminine	Neuter	Masculine	Feminine	Neuter
Past tense	I person	(jå) łyś-å-ł-ëm	(jå) łyś-a-ł-a-m	N/A	(my) łyś-e-l-y-m or (my) łyś-e-l-y-źwa	(my) łyś-a-ł-y-m or (my) łyś-a-ł-y-źwa	N/A
Past tense	II person	(ty) łyś-å-ł-eś	(ty) łyś-a-ł-a-ś	N/A	(wy) łyś-e-l-y-śta or (wy) łyś-e-l-y-śće	(wy) łyś-a-ł-y-śta or (wy) łyś-a-ł-y-śće	N/A
Past tense	III person	(łón) łyś-å-ł-∅	(łóna) łyś-a-ł-a	(łóno) łyś-a-ł-o	(łóńï) łyś-e-l-y	(łóny) łyś-a-ł-y	(łóne) łyś-a-ł-y
Participles
Participles	Contemporary adverbial participle	łyśej-ąc					
Participles	Anterior adverbial participle	wyłyś-å-wsy					

==== Class V ====
Class V comprises -a stem verbs - their infinitive is formed with -ać. This class shares much with class I. Alternations are akin to that of standard Polish, but undergoing sound laws.

Class V verbs (-a stems)
Present tense	Person	Singular			Plural		
Present tense	I person	(jå) pśïs-ë			(my) pśïs-ëm		
Present tense	II person	(ty) pśïs-es			(wy) pśïs-eta or (wy) pśïs-eće		
Present tense	III person	(łón, łóna, łóno) pśïs-e			(łóńï, łóny, łóne) pśïs-ó		
Past tense	Person	Singular			Plural		
Past tense	Person	Masculine	Feminine	Neuter	Masculine	Feminine	Neuter
Past tense	I person	(jå) pśïs-å-ł-ëm	(jå) pśïs-a-ł-a-m	N/A	(my) pśïs-a-l-y-m or (my) pśïs-a-l-y-źwa	(my) pśïs-a-ł-y-m or (my) pśïs-a-ł-y-źwa	N/A
Past tense	II person	(ty) pśïs-å-ł-eś	(ty) pśïs-a-ł-a-ś	N/A	(wy) pśïs-a-l-y-śta or (wy) pśïs-a-l-y-śće	(wy) pśïs-a-ł-y-śta or (wy) pśïs-a-ł-y-śće	N/A
Past tense	III person	(łón) pśïs-å-ł-∅	(łóna) pśïs-a-ł-a	(łóno) pśïs-a-ł-o	(łóńï) pśïs-a-l-y	(łóny) pśïs-a-ł-y	(łóne) pśïs-a-ł-y
Participles	Passive adjectival participle	Singular			Plural		
Participles	Passive adjectival participle	Masculine	Feminine	Neuter	Plural		
Participles	Passive adjectival participle	napśïs-an-y	napśïs-an-å	napśïs-an-e	napśïs-an-e		
Participles	Contemporary adverbial participle	pśïs-ąc					
Participles	Anterior adverbial participle	napśïs-å-wsy					

==== Class VI ====
Class VI comprises -aj stem verbs. The present tense differs drastically; the first person singular is formed with -m as opposed to -ë; the first person plural is formed with -my as opposed to -m;, and the second person singular and plural and third person singular are lacking thematic vowels; the third person plural is formed with -ó as with other classes, but in this class is preceded by thematic -aj-. The presence of -my, as opposed to -m in the first person plural is to distinguish it from the first person singular. The distribution of å||a in past tense forms is identical to that found in class I verbs, and the passive adjectival participle and anterior adverbial participle are formed identically to class I verbs.

Class VI verbs (-aj stems)
Present tense	Person	Singular			Plural		
Present tense	I person	(jå) cyt-ó-m			(my) cyt-ó-my		
Present tense	II person	(ty) cyt-å-s			(wy) cyt-å-ta or (wy) cyt-å-će		
Present tense	III person	(łón, łóna, łóno) cyt-å			(łóńï, łóny, łóne) cyt-aj-ó		
Past tense	Person	Singular			Plural		
Past tense	Person	Masculine	Feminine	Neuter	Masculine	Feminine	Neuter
Past tense	I person	(jå) cyt-å-ł-ëm	(jå) cyt-a-ł-a-m	N/A	(my) cyt-a-l-y-m or (my) cyt-a-l-y-źwa	(my) cyt-a-ł-y-m or (my) cyt-a-ł-y-źwa	N/A
Past tense	II person	(ty) cyt-å-ł-eś	(ty) cyt-a-ł-a-ś	N/A	(wy) cyt-a-l-y-śta or (wy) cyt-a-l-y-śće	(wy) cyt-a-ł-y-śta or (wy) cyt-a-ł-y-śće	N/A
Past tense	III person	(łón) cyt-å-ł-∅	(łóna) cyt-a-ł-a	(łóno) cyt-a-ł-o	(łóńï) cyt-a-l-y	(łóny) cyt-a-ł-y	(łóne) cyt-a-ł-y
Participles	Passive adjectival participle	Singular			Plural		
Participles	Passive adjectival participle	Masculine	Feminine	Neuter	Plural		
Participles	Passive adjectival participle	przecyt-an-y	przecyt-an-å	przecyt-an-e	przecyt-an-e		
Participles	Contemporary adverbial participle	cyt-aj-ąc					
Participles	Anterior adverbial participle	przecyt-å-wsy					

==== Root verbs ====
Root verbs (Polish: czasowniki rdzenne) are divided into three classes, -j stems, consonantal stems, and nasal vowel stems.

-j stem verbs differ from other classes in the passive adjectival participle, which is formed with -t- as opposed to -n-. If the root contains -ï- or -y-, this vowel alternates ó is masculine singular forms or é in other forms as in class II due to sound changes, e.g. pśółëm, pśélym (standard piłem, piliśmy) or sółëm, sélym (standard szyłem, szyliśmy); regionally this alternation is with u in the masculine past tense and the original vowel elsewhere, e.g. pśuł, pśïła (standard pił, piła) or suł, syła (standard szył, szyła).

-j stem root verbs
Present tense	Person	Singular			Plural		
Present tense	I person	(jå) truj-ë			(my) truj-ëm		
Present tense	II person	(ty) truj-es			(wy) truj-eta or (wy) truj-eće		
Present tense	III person	(łón, łóna, łóno) truj-e			(łóńï, łóny, łóne) truj-ó		
Past tense	Person	Singular			Plural		
Past tense	Person	Masculine	Feminine	Neuter	Masculine	Feminine	Neuter
Past tense	I person	(jå) tru-ł-ëm	(jå) truł-a-m	N/A	(my) trul-y-m or (my) tru-l-y-źwa	(my) tru-ł-y-m or (my) tru-ł-y-źwa	N/A
Past tense	II person	(ty) truł-eś	(ty) truł-a-ś	N/A	(wy) tru-l-y-śta or (wy) tru-l-y-śće	(wy) tru-ł-y-śta or (wy) tru-ł-y-śće	N/A
Past tense	III person	(łón) tru-ł-∅	(łóna) tru-ł-a	(łóno) tru-ł-o	(łóńï) tru-l-y	(łóny) tru-ł-y	(łóne) tru-ł-y
Participles	Passive adjectival participle	Singular			Plural		
Participles	Passive adjectival participle	Masculine	Feminine	Neuter	Plural		
Participles	Passive adjectival participle	łotru-t-y	łotru-t-å	łotru-t-e	łotru-t-e		
Participles	Contemporary adverbial participle	truj-ąc					
Participles	Anterior adverbial participle	łotru-wsy					

Consonantal stems end in a consonant, e.g. pléś(-), gryź(-), tłuk(-). The passive participle is formed differently from -j stem verbs and takes -ón- as opposed to -t- (except consonantal verbs whose stems end in the sonorants j, r, l, m, n, and ń), and the anterior adverbial participle is formed with -sy as opposed to -wsy, similar standard Polish. In the masculine singular past tense, -ł- is absent due to sound changes; in standard Polish, the form tłukł may similarly be pronounced as tłuk in a colloquial context. If the verb's stem ends in -z-, -g-, or -d- they devoice to -s-, -k-, and -t- respectively in the masculine singular past, even before clitics, e.g. (jå) gryzë but (jå) grysëm, (łón) grys-∅ (standard gryzę, gryzłem, gryzł, but gryzł may sometimes colloquially be pronounced as grys). The past anterior adverbial participle is written with voiced -zsy, -gsy, and -dsy. The ablaut of e||o in such verbs, e.g. standard gniotę||gnieciesz (infinitive gnieść is similar with a few differences; the infinitive has é, e.g. gńéść, ó appears in all masculine singular forms, thus gnóteś (standard gniotłeś). A few -d- stem verbs show -dz- in the passive adjectival participle instead of -dź-, namely (za)źedzóny (infinitive zaźéść, standard (za)wiedziony, infinitive zawieść), (po)kładzóny (infinitive (po)kłaść), and łukradzóny (infinitive łukraść). The verb paść (stem pas-) does not show -å- in the masculine singular past. Nasal alternation of ą||ę̈ occurs in a similar distrution to that of ą||ę in standard Polish.

Consonantal stem root verbs
Present tense	Person	Singular			Plural		
Present tense	I person	(jå) tłuk-ë			(my) tłuc-ëm		
Present tense	II person	(ty) tłuc-es			(wy) tłuc-eta or (wy) tłuc-eće		
Present tense	III person	(łón, łóna, łóno) tłuc-e			(łóńï, łóny, łóne) tłuk-ó		
Past tense	Person	Singular			Plural		
Past tense	Person	Masculine	Feminine	Neuter	Masculine	Feminine	Neuter
Past tense	I person	(jå) tłuk-ëm	(jå) tłuk-ł-a-m	N/A	(my) tłuk-l-y-m or (my) tłuk-l-y-źwa	(my) tłuk-ł-y-m or (my) tłuk-ł-y-źwa	N/A
Past tense	II person	(ty) tłuk-eś	(ty) tłuk-ł-a-ś	N/A	(wy) tłuk-l-y-śta or (wy) tłuk-l-y-śće	(wy) tłuk-ł-y-śta or (wy) tłuk-ł-y-śće	N/A
Past tense	III person	(łón) tłuk-∅	(łóna) tłuk-ł-a	(łóno) tłuk-ł-o	(łóńï) tłuk-l-y	(łóny) tłuk-ł-y	(łóne) tłuk-ł-y
Participles	Passive adjectival participle	Singular			Plural		
Participles	Passive adjectival participle	Masculine	Feminine	Neuter	Plural		
Participles	Passive adjectival participle	tłuc-ón-y	tłuc-ón-å	tluc-ón-e	tłuc-ón-e		
Participles	Contemporary adverbial participle	tłuk-ąc					
Participles	Anterior adverbial participle	potłuk-sy					

Nasal vowel root verbs may contain a nasal in the root itself, e.g. klą-ć, ćą-ć, or be formed with the suffix -ną-, e.g. śtuk-ną-ć, zamk-ną-ć.

The largest difference lies in the past tense, which is formed with -n- (-ń-) instead of -ł- (-l-), and -ó-, -ë- instead of -ą-, -ę- respectively; masculine personal plural forms take -ńï- whereas non-personal forms take -ny.

Nasal stems ending in -m- in standard Polish (wziąć, (-)jąć, (-)żąć, (-)dąć are levelled to take -n-: wźąźć, weznë, weźnies.

Verbs formed with -nąć, as in standard Polish, may form the past tense with or without the morpheme -n-; some verbs always show it, e.g. zamknąć, zamknón (standard zamknąć, zamknął), some use either -n- (-ń) orbut -ł- (-l), e.g. moknąć, moknón or mokła (standard moknąć, moknął or mokła, or others use either -n- (-ń) in the present tense but -ł- (-l) in the past, e.g. zbladnąć, zbladnë, but zbladła (standard zbladnę, zbladnë, but zbladła).

Nasal vowel root verbs
Present tense	Person	Singular			Plural		
Present tense	I person	(jå) kln-ë			(my) klń-ëm		
Present tense	II person	(ty) klń-es			(wy) klń-eta or (wy) klń-eće		
Present tense	III person	(łón, łóna, łóno) klń-e			(łóńï, łóny, łóne) kln-ó		
Past tense	Person	Singular			Plural		
Past tense	Person	Masculine	Feminine	Neuter	Masculine	Feminine	Neuter
Past tense	I person	(jå) klón-ëm	(jå) klën-a-m	N/A	(my) klëń-ï-m or (my) klëń-ï-źwa	(my) klën-y-m or (my) klën-y-źwa	N/A
Past tense	II person	(ty) klón-eś	(ty) klën-a-ś	N/A	(wy) klëń-ï-śta or (wy) klëń-ï-śće	(wy) klën-y-śta or (wy) klën-y-śće	N/A
Past tense	III person	(łón) klón-∅	(łóna) klën-a	(łóno) klën-o	(łóńï) klëń-ï	(łóny) klën-y	(łóne) klën-y
Participles	Passive adjectival participle	Singular			Plural		
Participles	Passive adjectival participle	Masculine	Feminine	Neuter	Plural		
Participles	Passive adjectival participle	przeklę̈-t-y	przeklę̈-t-å	przeklę̈-t-e	przeklę̈-t-e		
Participles	Contemporary adverbial participle	kln-ąc					
Participles	Anterior adverbial participle	przeklå-wsy					

==== r-stem verbs ====
r-stem verbs behave similarly to consonantal stem verbs.

r-stem verbs
Present tense	Person	Singular			Plural		
Present tense	I person	(jå) tr-ë			(my) trz-ëm		
Present tense	II person	(ty) trz-es			(wy) trz-eta or (wy) trz-eće		
Present tense	III person	(łón, łóna, łóno) trz-e			(łóńï, łóny, łóne) tr-ó		
Past tense	Person	Singular			Plural		
Past tense	Person	Masculine	Feminine	Neuter	Masculine	Feminine	Neuter
Past tense	I person	(jå) ter-ëm	(jå) ter-ł-a-m	N/A	(my) ter-l-y-m or (my) ter-l-y-źwa	(my) ter-ł-y-m or (my) ter-ł-y-źwa	N/A
Past tense	II person	(ty) ter-eś	(ty) ter-ł-a-ś	N/A	(wy) ter-l-y-śta or (wy) ter-l-y-śće	(wy) ter-ł-y-śta or (wy) ter-ł-y-śće	N/A
Past tense	III person	(łón) ter-∅	(łóna) ter-ł-a	(łóno) ter-ł-o	(łóńï) losowa-l-y	(łóny) ter-ł-y	(łóne) ter-ł-y

=== Examples ===
Lord's prayer (Łojce nas)
Kurpian

Łojce nas, chtórnyś je w ńebźe
Śwę̈ć śë jïńë Twoje,
Przyjdź Królewstwo Twoje,
Bądź wolå Twoja,
Jeko w ńebźe, tak jï na źëńï.
Chleba naségo powsednégo
Dåj nóm dźïśåj
Jï łodpuść nóm nase źïny
Jeko jï my łodpuscómy
Nasëm źïnowajcóm.
Jï ńe wódź nås na pokusëńe
Łale nas zbåw łode złégo
Łamën.

Polish

Ojcze nasz, któryś jest w niebie,
święć się imię Twoje,
przyjdź królestwo Twoje,
bądź wola Twoja
jako w niebie tak i na ziemi.
Chleba naszego powszedniego daj nam dzisiaj.
I odpuść nam nasze winy,
jako i my odpuszczamy naszym winowajcom.
I nie wódź nas na pokuszenie,
ale nas zbaw od złego.
Amen.

English

Our Father who art in heaven,
hallowed be thy name.
Thy kingdom come,
thy will be done,
on earth, as it is in heaven.
Give us this day our daily bread,
and forgive us our trespasses,
as we forgive those who trespass against us.
And lead us not into temptation,
but deliver us from evil.
Amen.

== See also ==
- Dialects of the Polish language
- Languages of Europe
- Polish language

== Bibliography ==
- Karaś, Halina (2010). "Kurpie". dialektologia.uw.edu.pl.
- Karaś, Halina (2010). "Gwara kurpiowska – historia i współczesność". dialektologia.uw.edu.pl.
- Rubach, Jerzy (2009). Zasady pisowni literackiego dialektu kurpiowskiego (PDF) (in Polish). Ostrołęka: Związek Kurpiów.
- Rubach, Jerzy (2016). Kurpiowska koniugacja (in Polish). Ostrołęka: Związek Kurpiów. ISBN 978-83-940655-6-0.
- Rubach, Jerzy (2017). Kurpiowska deklinacja (in Polish). Ostrołęka: Związek Kurpiów. ISBN 978-83-946450-2-1.
- Rubach, Jerzy (2019). Kurpiowska ortografia (in Polish). Ostrołęka: Związek Kurpiów. ISBN 978-83-953060-1-3.
- Gadomski, Henryk (2022). Słownik dialektu kurpiowskiego (in Polish). Ostrołęka: Związek Kurpiów. ISBN 978-83-963465-4-4.
- Siatkowska, Ewa (2017). "Standaryzacja po kurpiowsku". Polonica (in Polish). XXXVII.
