= Rubach =

Rubach is a surname. Notable people with the surname include:

- Dieter Rubach (born 1955), German musician
- Jerzy Rubach (born 1948), Polish linguist
