= Jerzy Rubach =

Polish linguist (born 1948)

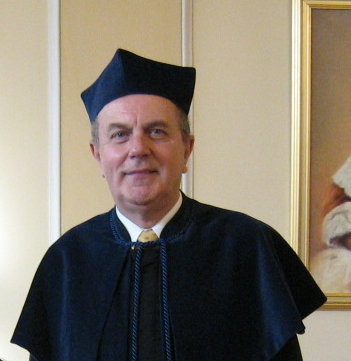
Jerzy Jan Rubach in 2008

Jerzy Jan Rubach ([ˈjɛʐɨ ˈrubax]; born February 16, 1948, in Gdynia) is a Polish linguist who specializes in phonology. He is a professor of linguistics at the University of Iowa and the University of Warsaw (Poland).

In 1966-1971 Rubach studied at the Institute of English, University of Warsaw, where he got his master's degree in linguistics in 1971. He earned his Ph.D. in 1974 and Ph.D.Litt in 1981 (for his work Cyclic Phonology and Palatalization in Polish and English). In 1988, he was promoted to the rank of professor. In the years 1984-1990, Rubach was chair of the Institute of English, University of Warsaw, and since 1984 he has been chair of the department of English language and linguistics (the equivalent of a department of linguistics in US universities) there.

Rubach held visiting appointments at a number of universities in Europe and the U.S., including Vrije Universiteit (The Netherlands), University of Potsdam (Germany), University of Illinois at Urbana-Champaign, University of Washington, the Ohio State University, University of California, San Diego. In 1990, he joined the faculty of the department of linguistics at the University of Iowa, where he is professor of linguistics until present.

He has written five books, notably Cyclic and Lexical Phonology: The Structure of Polish (1984, Foris) and The Lexical Phonology of Slovak (1993, Oxford University Press).

In recent years, Rubach has advocated derivational optimality theory, a version of Optimality Theory in phonology which recognizes the need for derivational levels. Optimality Theory suggests that all constraints apply simultaneously rather than sequentially, however, through his research on Slavic languages and the historical change of English, Rubach has argued in favor of derivational levels. Under derivational optimality theory, a language's ranking of constraints can change - constraints can be re-ranked between derivational levels.

Since 2003, Rubach has been doing fieldwork on the phonological system of Kurpian, a dialect of Polish spoken in northern Poland (Kurpia). He devised a uniform system of Kurpian orthography, which was presented in his book Zasady pisowni kurpiowskiego dialektu literackiego [Orthographic Principles of the Kurpian Literary Dialect], published in 2009. The system was adopted by speakers of Kurpian, earning Rubach the reputation of the founding father of Kurpian orthography.

== Selected publications ==
- "Soft Labial Conspiracy in Kurpian", Journal of Linguistics 50 (2014), 185-230.
- "Exceptional Segments in Polish", Natural Language and Linguistic Theory 31 (2013), DOI 10.1007/s11049-013-9204.
- "Syllabic repairs in Macedonian," Lingua 121 (2011), 237-268.
- "The vocalic system of Kurpian," Studies in Polish Linguistics 6 (2011), 81-98.
- "Slavic palatalization," in M. van Oostendorp, C. Ewen, B. Hume, and K. Rice (eds.),Companion to Phonology (2011), Oxford/Boston: Blackwell-Wiley, 2908-2935.
- Zasady pisowni kurpiowskiego dialektu literackiego [Orthographic Principles of the Kurpian Literary Dialect], wyd. Związek Kurpiów i Muzeum Kultury Kurpiowskiej, Ostrołęka 2009.
- "Prevocalic Faithfulness", Phonology 25 (2008),1-36.
- "Mid Vowel Fronting in Ukrainian", Phonology, 22 (2005), 1-36.
- "Derivation in Optimality Theory: A Reply to Burzio", Linguistic Inquiry, 35 (2004), 656-670.
- "Duke-of-York derivations in Polish", Linguistic Inquiry, 34 (2003), 601-629.
- "Polish Palatalization in Derivational Optimality Theory", Lingua, 113 (2003), 197-237.
- "Against Subsegmental Glides", Linguistic Inquiry, 33 (2002), 672-687.
- "Allomorphy in Optimality Theory: Polish Iotation", Language, 77 (2001), 26-60; co-authored with Geert E. Booij.
- "Backness Switch in Russian", Phonology, 17 (2000); 39-64.
- "Glide and Glottal Stop Insertion in Slavic Languages: A DOT Analysis", Linguistic Inquiry, 31 (2000), 271-317.
- "A Slovak Argument for the Onset - Rhyme Distinction", Linguistic Inquiry, 29 (1998), 168-179.
- "Shortening and Ambisyllabicity in English", Phonology, 13 (1996), 197-238.
- "Nonsyllabic Analysis of Voice Assimilation in Polish", Linguistic Inquiry, 27 (1996), 69-110.
- "Affricates as Strident Stops in Polish", Linguistic Inquiry, 25 (1994), 119-143.
- "Skeletal versus Moraic Representations in Slovak", Natural Language and Linguistic Theory, 11 (1993), 625-653.
- The Lexical Phonology of Slovak, (1993), Oxford: Oxford University Press.
- Cyclic and Lexical Phonology. The Structure of Polish, (1984), Dordrecht: Foris Publications.
