= Sandomierzans =

Polish subethnic group

Sandomierzacy
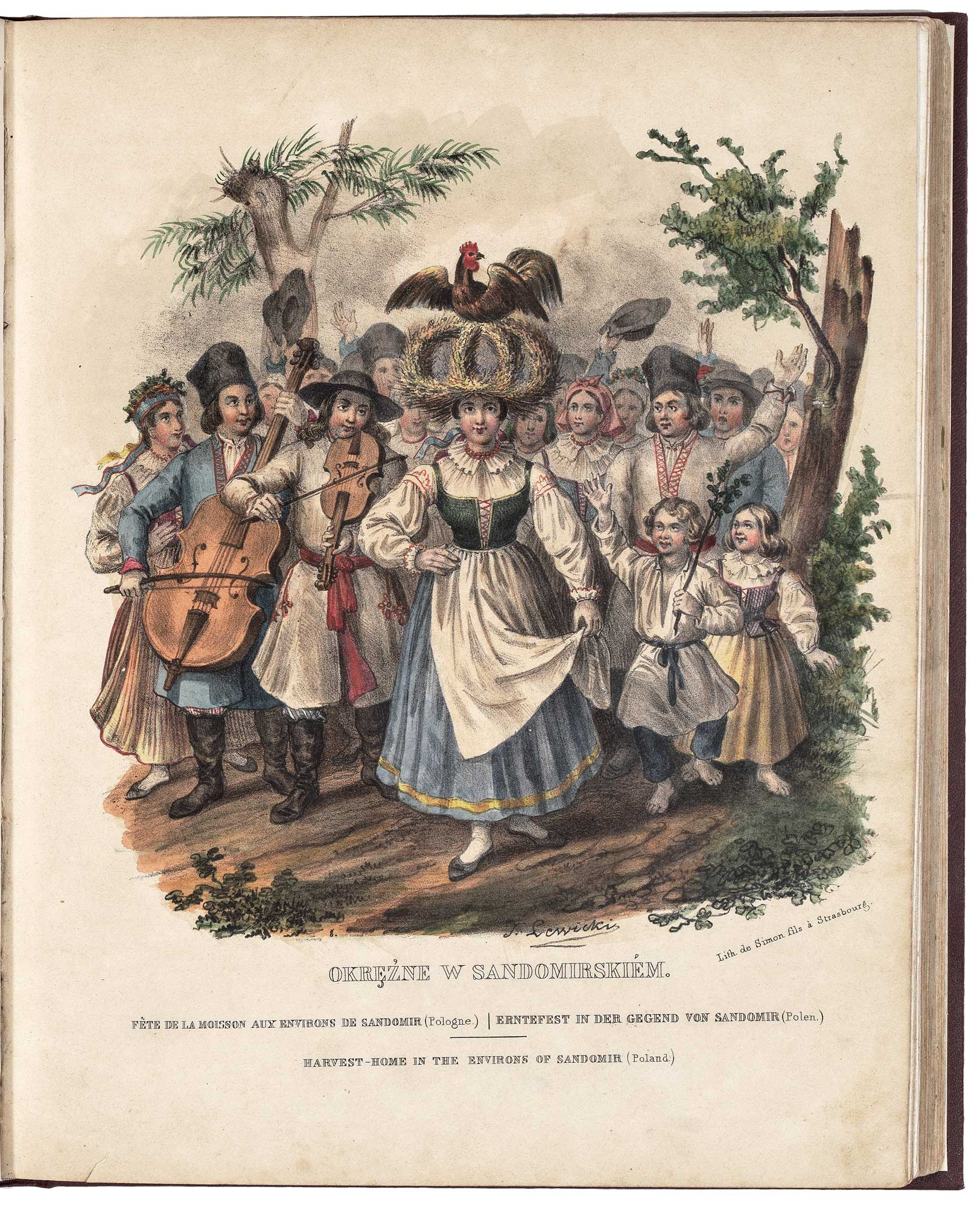
- A 19th century lithograph of Sandomierzans celebrating dożynki

Regions with significant populations
- Sandomierz Basin

Languages
- Lesser Polish

Religion
- Roman Catholicism

Related ethnic groups
- Lasovians; Posaniacy; Sandomierz Borowians

The Sandomierzans (Polish: Sandomierzacy) are an ethnographic group of the Polish people, who reside in the historic province of Lesser Poland, around the town of Sandomierz. They use their own dialect, which belongs to Lesser Polish dialect of the Polish language. Like most Poles, the Sandomierzacy are Roman Catholics.

The Sandomierzacy proper reside along the left bank of the Vistula river, reaching Ilza and Skaryszew in the north, and Checiny in the west. They also live southeast of Sandomierz, in the former Austrian Galicia. Together with the Cracovians, the Sandomierzacy are the oldest ethnic group of Lesser Poland. In the 19th century, when Lesser Poland was for over 100 years divided between the Habsburg Empire and the Russian Empire, the Sandomierzacy were under the influence of Mazovia, which resulted in several changes, mostly in their traditional clothing.

== Subroups ==
The Sandomiersz Borowians (Polish: Borowiacy sandomierscy) is a small subethnic group of the Sandomierzans, who reside along the right bank of the San river, in forested areas of Janow Lubelski.

The Posaniacy is another subethnic group of the Sandomierzans. They inhabited the Sandomierz Forest, and in the 19th century, most of them settled in forests around Radom.

== Sources ==
- Encyklopedia Polski. wyd. Wydawnictwo Ryszard Kluszczynski, Kraków 1996.

== See also ==
- Świętokrzyskie cuisine
- Lesser Poland
