= Cracovians (ethnic group) =

Krakowiacy
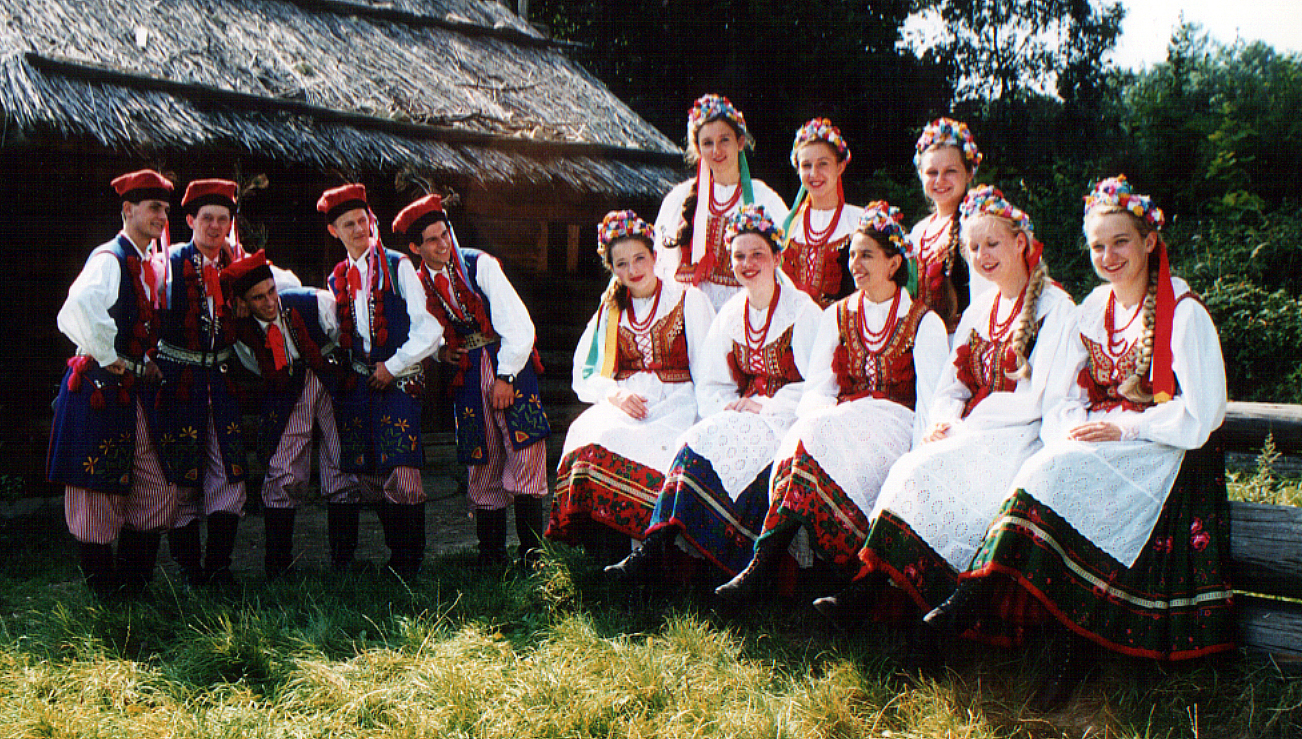
- A group of Cracovians posing whilst in folk costumes (stroj krakowski)

Regions with significant populations
- Lesser Poland

Languages
- Eastern and Kraków dialects

Religion
- Roman Catholicism

Related ethnic groups
- Sandomierzans

Cracovians (Polish: Krakowiacy) are an ethnographic subgroup of the Polish people, who resides in the historic region of Lesser Poland around the city of Kraków. They use their own dialect, which belongs to the Lesser Polish dialect cluster of the Polish language, and are mostly Roman Catholic.

The Cracovians are divided into two geographic subgroups, the Eastern Cracovians who inhabit the areas east of Kraków from Jędrzejów and Miechów to Tarnów, and the Western Cracovians who reside west of Kraków. Their traditional dress is considered to be the quintessential Kraków folk costume (stroj krakowski).

In the south (north of the Gorals), the extent of the Cracovians reaches the line marked by the towns of Bielsko-Biała, Wadowice, Kalwaria Zebrzydowska, Myślenice, Lipnica Murowana and Tarnów. In the east, the boundary between the Cracovians and the Sandomierzans is not well established, reaching as far as Tarnów and Połaniec. In the west, the Cracovians reaches the Przemsza river, which has for centuries marked the border between Lesser Poland and Silesia. In the north, they reach the line marked by Częstochowa and Kielce.

The folklore of the Cracovians inspired several Polish artists, especially during the Young Poland period. Furthermore, Wojciech Bogusławski's Krakowiacy i Gorale, regarded as the first Polish national opera, premiered in Warsaw on 1 March 1794.

== Sources ==
- Encyklopedia Polski (in Polish). Cracow: Wydawnictwo Ryszard Kluszczyński. 1996. ISBN 83-86328-60-6.
