= Lasovia dialect =

Dialect of Polish spoken in Poland

- Native to: Poland
- Region: Lasovia
- Ethnicity: Lasovians
- Language family: Indo-European: Balto-Slavic; Slavic; West Slavic; Lechitic; Polish; Lesser Polish; Lasovia dialect

Language codes
- ISO 639-3: –

The Lasovia dialect is a dialect of Polish that belongs to the Lesser Poland dialect group and is spoken by the Lasovians in Subcarpathia, Poland. It borders the Kielce dialect to the northwest, the Western Lublin dialect to the northeast, the Eastern Lublin dialect to the east, the Przemyśl dialect to the southeast, the Biecz dialect to the southwest, the Eastern Krakow dialect to the southwest. The Lasovian dialect can be divided into four regions: eastern, central, northern, and western. Villages by the San and Łęg rivers are more similar the central subdialects, villages between the Vistula and Łęg are more like subdialects in Sandomierz, and villages near Grębów have traits of both.

== Phonology ==
Both voicing and devoicing of word-final consonants before vowels and liquids is present here, with devoicing being common in the north from Masovian influence. Also typical of Lesser Polish dialects is the presence of mazuration, but is quickly being lost, particularly in the east. In the east, mazuration is not present (except the western-most part of this area).

=== Vowels ===
Often e > ‘o is levelled: wiezło (wiozło).

==== Slanted vowels ====
Slanted á raises to o, but was until recently retained as á. Slanted é raises to i after soft consonants and to y after hard consonants. Slanted ó typically raises to u, or sometimes lowers to o, but was until recently retained as ó. In the east, slanted ó is retained as ó.

==== Nasal vowels ====
In the east and north (around Jamnica), nasal vowels lose all nasality and are realized as e, o. In Dąbrowica, nasality is only partially lost. Final -ą can be either -o or -om, and final -ę loses nasality. Medially, decomposition and raising of ą > óN and ę > iN, yN) is more common, except before sonorants and ch, where they are raised and denasalized. In other places, nasal vowels are decomposed and lowered before sonorants (with many exceptions where nasality is lost): ę changes to æN and ą to aN, and similarly eN to æN. In the north, eN tends to raise to yN, áN, and oN to óN. Often aN fronts to eN, æN. Often uN is lowered to óN, oN, and iN, yN often lower to eN. In central Lasovia, ę changes to ą, eN to aN, there is lack of decomposition of nasals, and there is a retention of uN (without lowering). In the north, nasals are denasalized. In the west, nasal vowels denasalize in the north of this region and ę denasalizes in the south.

==== Prothesis ====
Initial o- and u- often undergo labialization to ô-, û-. A few other cases of prothesis before other word-initial vowels can be found, but are rare and limited to a few words.

=== Consonants ===
In the east, dark ł is retained, which is also retained in the north, l softens to l', one can see a retention of źr in -źrzeć verbs (uźryć), except in the north, where there is metathesis of rź in -źrzeć verbs, in the east, the groups ńc, ńcz harden to nc, ncz, and the form drzeń (pronounced dżżyń) (rdzeń) is still present. In central Lasovia k hardens before inflections (rogam) and there is a retention of r in clusters, specifically the words: marszczyć, zmarszczki. li is not softened in the north. In the west there is a shift of kr- > chr- (chrosta). ń has many realizations, often inconsistent, depending on the village. In Puszcza Sandomierska, ń > jⁿ (nasal j̨). In villages by the Wisłoka and Vistula rivers, Dąbrowica, Jamnica, Wola Żarczycka and Wola Raniżowska, ń > j. In Wola Żarczycka, ńc, ńcz > nc, ncz. In the east, ń is retained. A change of źr > rź in -źrzeć verbs can be found: ujrzeć (uźrzeć) > urzić, now rare. Sometimes final -ch > -k, very limited in range. Often h can be realized as [ɦ, ɣ] due to contact with the Southern Borderlands dialects.

== Inflection ==
Some features typical of Lesser Polish inflection are present here, as well as Masovian.

=== Nouns ===
The instrumental singular of feminine nouns is realized as -om. The instrumental plural of nouns is -amy. The locative singular of neuter nouns shows an archaic declension: na tem jeziorce (na tym jeziorku). -ów is used for the genitive plural of nouns regardless of gender.

=== Adjectives, adverbs, pronouns, and numerals ===
In central Lasovia there is a retention of slanted e in -ego (-igo, -ygo). The numerals 5-10 show archaic declensions as well.

=== Verbs ===
In central Lasovia dáj is used instead of dej. -wa can be seen alongside -my in the first person plural present and past of verbs, as well as -śwa in the past. In the past tense, often masculine animal forms are used instead of masculine personal: chłopoki dokucały (chłopcy dokuczali). Often the plural is used as a respectful form.

=== Prepositions and prefixes ===
In the west there is a retention of s- (z-) as a prefix.

== Vocabulary ==
=== Word-Formation ===
Typical Lesser Polish dialect features in the word-formation can be here.

==== Adjectives, adverbs, pronouns, and numerals ====
Adverbs and pronouns are often made with -ik, -ok. Diminutives of adverbs are often formed with -eńko where in Standard Polish there would be -utko as a result of contact with the Borderlands dialects.

==== Verbs ====
Frequentatives are formed with -ować where in Standard Polish there would be -iwać, -ywać.

== Syntax ==
Often numerals above five do not govern the genitive plural when the numeral is in the nominative or accusative: siedym kilometry. This occurs mostly in the east due to contact with the Borderlands dialects.

== See also ==
- Dialects of the Polish language
- Languages of Europe
- Polish language
