= Biecz dialect =

Dialect of Polish spoken in Poland

- Native to: Poland
- Region: Biecz
- Language family: Indo-European: Balto-Slavic; Slavic; West Slavic; Lechitic; Polish; Lesser Polish; Biecz dialect

Language codes
- ISO 639-3: –

The Biecz dialect (Polish: gwara biecka), also known as the Pogorzan dialect (Polish: gwara pogórzańska; "Uplander dialect") is a dialect of the Polish language belonging to the Lesser Poland dialect group. It borders the Podegrodzie dialect to the west, the Eastern Krakow dialect to the north, the Lasovia dialect to the northeast, and the Przemyśl dialect to the east. Its eastern boundary with the Przemyśl dialect is unclear, with some sources placing it as far as beyond the San River.

It is spoken by the Pogorzans, who include the West and East Pogorzans, as well as some surrounding ethnographic groups. Historically, it was also spoken by assimilated German settlers in the area known as Forest Germans (German: Walddeutsche) or Deaf Germans (German: Taubdeutsche, Polish: Głuchoniemcy).

Due to its position, Biecz is a very diverse dialect, with unclear northern and western borders, as in recent times the border of areas with mazuration and without has become less distinct.

== Phonology ==
Typical of Lesser Polish dialects (as well as Greater Polish dialects), voicing of word-final consonants before vowels and liquids is present here. Also typical of Lesser Polish dialects is the presence of mazuration, however, mazuration here is inconsistent and fading as result of a negative association with dialectal features, now being restricted to specific words. Often ablaut is levelled: uniesła (uniosła). In parts of this region, o can sometimes front, and then sometimes unround, sounding like e, phonetically near [œ]. A few cases of metathesis are recorded: druślok (durszlak). Somewords have lost a medial syllable as a result of initial stress that was common in Old Polish: płockej (poczekaj).

=== Vowels ===
A few instances of eł switch to oł, or less commonly ół: połne (pełne), pudołko (pudełko), kukiołka (kukiełka), Pawół (Paweł). -ił, -ył shift to -uł, generally in verb forms, particularly the third person singular past: robiuł (robił). -ej shifts to -i (after soft consonants) and to -y (after hard consonants) typically in the comparative of adverbs as well as medially in a few words: zdymowały (zdejmowały), zdymcie (zdejmijcie). Regionally e may be inserted in certain consonant clusters: wiater (wiatr), especially in the prepositions/prefixes w(-), z(-).

==== Slanted vowels ====
Slanted vowels are typically raised, so á > o, é > y (after both hard and soft consonants), but ó is often still ó. Vowels also tend to raise before liquids, and the group uN tends to lower óN.

==== Nasal vowels ====
Word-medially nasal vowels tend to raise and decompose, except before sibilants, where they only raise; ę > yN, ą > oN, uN. Word finally, ę goes to em and ą decomposes to -om, -um, except in Olszyny, where -ą can denasalize to -o in certain inflections under influence of dialects in Bugaj, Sitnica i Łużna.

==== Prothesis ====
Word initial o and rarely u labialize to ô and û, and medial o can labialize after labials and velars. Labialization may be avoided by speakers in formal contexts as there is often a negative association with dialectal features. Initial i, and rarely e and a can have a prothetic j inserted before them; however this is uncommon.

=== Consonants ===
-ch shifts to -k in inflections and the particle niek (niech). Inflections may also be realized with -ch, especially on more recent times, where -k is fading. ch may change to k also in certain consonant clusters, particularly chc, chw, and especially chrz. The cluster tch rarely shifts to tf: tfórz (tchórz). ł often disappears in clusters, particularly after g: zogówek (zagłówek), and also intervocalically: bya (była). k, t, p, f in a few words are voiced, particularly when next to l: sweder (sweter), glizda (glista), blomba (plomba). t in consonant clusters can rarely shift to k: krzyźwy (trzeźwy). Many reductions of consonant clusters occurs, such as final -ść, -źć > -ś, -ź, -rdł- > -rł-, medial -łn- > -łń-, -stn- > -sn-, -rnk- > -rk-, -śln- > -śń-, -kk- > -k-, -strz- > -szcz-, -zdrz- > -żdż-, -trz- > -cz-, -strz- > -szcz-, and more rarely initial dl- > l-, gdź- > dź-. The group r-z (not the digraph rz) is typically realized as ż, sz: marznie (as if mażnie), gorztka (af if gosztka). Often s, ś in many words is doubled, and then the doubled s becomes c and śś becomes jś: błosco (boso), w lejsie (w lesie). Epenthetic -d- is also inserted in a few words. n before velars tends to be assimilated and pronounced velarly as well, even across morpheme boundaries. Syllable final -ń can sometimes be realized as -j: pajstwo (państwo), ciyj (cień). The group -jrz- in some verbs is rarely realized as -źr-: uźre (ujrzy). The group sł- shifts to sw- in a few verbs and their derivatives:: swyseć (słyszeć), wyswać (wysłać)/wysywać (wysyłać). -ższ- in certain comparative forms may shift to -ksz-: dłuksy (dłuższy), leksy (lżejszy).

== Inflection ==
Many inflectional patterns common to Lesser Polish dialects are found here.

=== Nouns ===
A few nouns have a gender different than in Standard Polish, and a few feminine nouns that typically end in a soft consonant or -i end in -a here: wsza (wesz). There is a preference for -a as the masculine singular genitive over -u. An archaic genitive singular -e is regionally kept in feminine soft-stem nouns: ze studnie (ze studni). -owi as the dative masculine singular can appear in place of -u as a result of hypercorrection: kotowi (kotu). A masculine locative singular ending -e can be seen in place of standard -u in soft-stem nouns as a result of mazuration : w kapelusie = w kapeluszu. A masculine nominative plural ending -o (from -á modelled on bracia, księża (historically braciá, księżá, here bracio, ksiy̨zo)) can be seen: wójcio (wójtowie), policjancio (policjanci), muzykancio (muzykanci). -ów can be used for the genitive plural regardless of gender. -ami can replace -mi as the instrumental plural via levelling: liściami (liśćmi).

=== Adjectives, adverbs, pronouns, and numerals ===
The comparative of adverbs may be -i/-y due to sound changes. Many numerals display particularly different forms: z dwióma chłopokami (z dwoma chłopakami), dwójko, pięciórko ludzi (dwoje, pięcioro ludzi).

=== Verbs ===
The past tense may be formed with -uł instead of -ył/-ił due to sound changes. -aj shifts to -ej in the imperative of verbs. Verbs ending in -nąć in the infinitive often do not have -ną-, -nę- in the past tense: ciągła (ciągnęła). A few verbs take a different declension paradigm than in Standard Polish: gwizdom (gwiżdżę), lubiałam (lubiłam); and stem-final labials often harden in declensions: złame (złamię). The first person singular and third person plural present/future tense are often levelled: mogymy, muszymy (możemy, musimy). -my may appear instead of -śmy in the first person past plural: jechalimy (jechaliśmy).

=== Prepositions and prefixes ===
The prepositions/prefixes w(-), z(-) are often extended to we(-), ze(-) before certain consonant clusters.

== Vocabulary ==
=== Word-Formation ===
Many typical Lesser Polish word-formation tendencies are found here.

==== Nouns ====
The suffixes -owo (from earlier -owá), -ino (from earlier -iná), and less commonly -ka denoting “wife of” attaching to surnames is common here: Karasiowo (wife of Karaś), Lijanino (wife of Lijana), Karaśka (wife of Karaś). The suffix -anka denoting “daughter of” attaching to surnames is also common: Lijanionka (daughter of Lijana). -ok (from earlier -ák) denoting “son of” attaching to surnames is also common: Majfelok (son of Majfela). -ok may also be appended to place names meaning “resident of”: bugajok (resident of Bugaj). The feminine equivalent of this is -ónka (from earlier -ánka: bugajónka (female resident of Bugaj).

==== Adjectives, adverbs, pronouns, and numerals ====
Adjectives formed with -aty may be seen here where in Standard Polish might be a different ending: cyrwieniaty (czerwonawy), paniaty (pański), and -ni may be seen instead of -ny: tylni (tylny). Adjectives and adverbs are more frequently diminutized. Many pronouns and adverbs are formed with -ik, -ok: tutok (tu), dziesik (gdzieś). Indefinite pronouns may be formed with choć- which often assimilates: choćco/chojco: (coś). -k may also be used to create emphatic pronouns and adverbs: tutok (tuż).

==== Verbs ====
Frequentative verbs are formed with -ować where in Standard Polish is typically -ywać.

== Syntax ==
In the east masculine and non-masculine syntax and declension is often levelled: chłopy siekli.

== See also ==
- Dialects of the Polish language
- Languages of Europe
- Polish language
