= Lasovians =

Polish subbethnic group

Lesioki
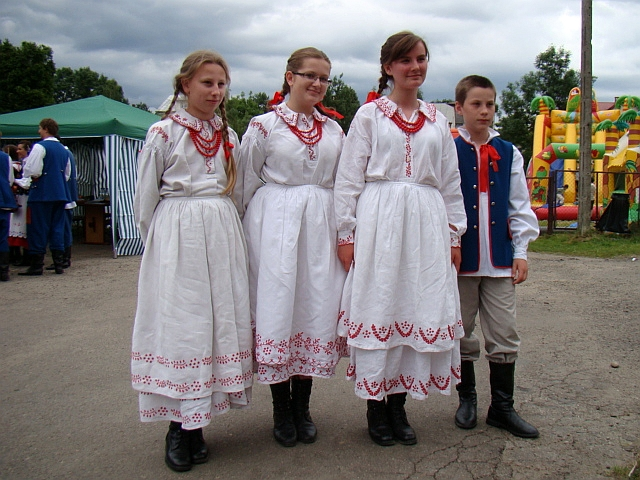
- A group of Lasovian youths in traditional dress in Bukowsko, 2010

Regions with significant populations
- Subcarpathia

Languages
- Lasovian

Religion
- Roman Catholicism

Related ethnic groups
- Sandomierzans

Lasovians (Polish language: Lasowiacy; Lesser Poland dialect: Lesioki) are a subethnic group of the Polish nation, who reside in Lesser Poland, at the confluence of the Vistula and the San rivers, Subcarpathian Voivodeship, southeastern Poland. They are descended from various ethnic groups, which settled in the dense Sandomierz Forest (hence the name, literally meaning "forest people") across centuries, with a dominant Polish element. The Lasowiacy were formed as a separate subethnic group in the late 19th and early 20th century. They use their own dialect, which belongs to Lesser Polish dialect cluster of the Polish language. Like most Poles, the Lasowiacy are Roman Catholics.

== Area ==
The area inhabited by the Lasowiacy ranges from Sandomierz and Nisko in the north, to Głogów Małopolski, Leżajsk, and Ropczyce. According to Polish ethnographer Franciszek Kotula, their territory is much wider, reaching to Tarnogród, Janów Lubelski and Biłgoraj.

== Language ==
The Lasowiacy dialect (Polish gwara lasowiacka or gwara lasowska) belongs to the Lesser Poland dialect of the Polish language. Since the forest was settled by the Mazovians, the Lasowiacy dialect has several features of the Masovian dialect, such as mazurzenie. Melchior Wańkowicz in his 1939 book Sztafeta gives an interesting example of the Lasowiacy dialect. In 1938, he went to the Lasowiacy village of Pławo, where a brand new industrial town of Stalowa Wola was being built. Wańkowicz talked to local residents, writing in the book: "The people in this village call themselves Lasowiacy, speaking a funny accent, which sounds like a mix of Goral dialect, and the language of Kurpie".

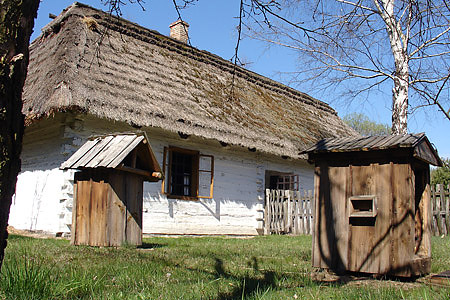
A Lasowiacy cabin from the village of Huta Przedborska, now at the open-air museum in Kolbuszowa
