= Western Lublin dialect =

Dialect of Polish spoken in Poland

- Native to: Poland
- Region: Southeastern Lesser Poland
- Language family: Indo-European: Balto-Slavic; Slavic; West Slavic; Lechitic; Polish; Lesser Polish; Western Lublin dialect

Language codes
- ISO 639-3: –

The Western Lublin dialect (Polish: gwary lubelszczyzny zachodniej) belongs to the Lesser Poland dialect group and is located in the eastern part of Poland. It borders the Eastern Lublin dialect to the east, the Lasovia dialect to the south, the Kielce dialect to the west, and the Masovia Near Mazovian dialect to the north. Due to position of this dialect, many transitional features can be seen, generally as the result of Masovian influence, particularly in the east. This region can be divided into three subregions: a northern region which is more transitional between Lesser Poland and Masovia, a central region with older Lesser Polish traits, and a southern region with newer Lesser Polish traits.

== Phonology ==
Atypical of Lesser Polish dialects, devoicing of word-final consonants before vowels and liquids is present here as the result of Masovian influence. Consonants may voice before clitics in the south, otherwise devoicing occurs also before clitics. mazuration is present in the east, but is quickly fading due to negative connotations, but c resulting from cz has the most cases of remaining, with s < sz, z < ż being the most undone.

=== Vowels ===
In the east, unstressed e rarely raises to y (after hard consonants)/i (after soft consonants): w pudyłeczku (w pudełeczku), na pichote (na piechotę), however typically unstressed e is kept as e; more commonly, unstressed o raises to u, or sometimes ó: kutuniu kuchany (kotuniu kochany), gódzina (godzina with /o/). These phenomena may also occur in other regions, but very rarely. In the eastern edges of this region, y may lower to o, particularly when stressed: popłonecek (podpłomyczek). As in many other Lesser Polish dialects, levelling of ablaut often occurs: przyniesłam (przyniosłam). A few words in the north show a lack of ablaut due to Masovian influence: wietrak (wiatrak), powiedać (powiadać), and sometimes in the south: zamietać (zamiatać). This feature is generally limited to particular words. Atypical of Lesser Polish dialects, the change of -aj > -ej is not present here: nie daj Boże, tutaj. However, a shift of -ej > -yj (after hard consonants)/-ij (after soft consonants) can be seen: wincyj (więcej) późnij (później). This resulting -yj/-ij may often weaken the final -j, or even lose it: najwięcy (najwięcej). Many consonant clusters are broken up by the insertion of -e-: meter (metr), odeszedł (odszedł).

==== Slanted vowels ====
Slanted á generally merged with normal a in the north: ublałam (oblałam), and elsewhere á generally merged with o: byłam młodo (byłam młoda). The reflexes of á in both regions have exceptions, in the north á is rarely o, and in the south á is rarely a. á before a nasal consonant and rarely before other liquids may raise further to u: kijunki (kijanki), miuł (miał). Slanted é is raised to y after hard consonants and to i after soft consonants, rarely it is kept as é; the groups ir/yr developed similarly: chlib (chleb), téż (też). Slanted ó is raised to u, and sometimes normal o was also raised to ó.

==== Nasal vowels ====
Nasal vowels have many realizations depending on region and position in a word. ę word-medially lowers in parts of the central region: gąs (pronounced gãs) (gęs), in the eastern edges it remains ę: gęs. In the west it may raise to i/y or é: z mę́żem (z mężem), rynki (ręki), or normally: czszęśli (trzęśli). ą generally rises: wiųnzać (wiązać). Until recently, nasality was kept before all consonants, but recently in the east and west nasals may decompose before non-sibilants and lose nasality before l and ł. Future forms of to be are exceptionally denasalized: bedzie (będzie). Word final -ą raises and denasalizes in the western edge: pójdu (pójdą), in the east something similar may occur, but the raising may be the result of raising unaccented o: byłam panienku (byłam panienką). In the north final -ą only denasalizes to -o without raising: z to kanko (z tą kanką). Final -ę at the edges of this region denasalizes to -e: na szkołe (na szkołę). Secondary nasalization may occur in some words, particularly after nasal consonants. Unstressed ą may raise to ų: wydrųżyli (wydrążyli), ciungnęło się (ciągnęło się). The cluster eN often lowers to aN: ciamno (ciemno), except in the eastern and western edges, where it rises to yN after hard consonants and iN after soft consonants including eN resulting from the decomposition of ęC: pińć (pięć), rzymień (rzemień). o can sometimes raise to u before nasals as well, including o resulting from raising á: do dumu (do domu), ni mum (nie mam). i and y, conversely, may lower before a nasal, especially in the east: zrobiemy (zrobimy).

==== Prothesis ====
o often labializes to ô, particularly word-initially. This can also occur to o resulting from á: pôcirz (pacierz). Medial labialization is limited to a few words in the north. A prothetic j may also occur before initial i in a few words.

=== Consonants ===
As a result of Masovian influence, partial decomposition of soft labials occurs: pjechotu (piechotą), nie wjedzioł (nie wiedział), mnieli (mieli), wjanki (wianki), and similarly św’ (śf’), partially depaltalizes in the west: śfynia (świnia). In the east, w may pronounced voiced after voiceless consonants: cwaniak (with /v/). In the east, dark ł is still present as the result of Eastern Slavic influence, and similarly, soft l’ is also present, particularly in the east: liokal’ (lokal). Elsewhere l may harden, lipa (as opposed to Standard Polish l’ipa), or even lypa, as a result of Masovian influence. k’ and g’ may inconsistently harden as a result of Masovian influence: w keszeniach (w kieszeniach).The group kt typically changes to cht: chto (kto), kk changes to tk: mintki (miękki). Some instances of changes in individual words are also noted: krzan (chrzan). A Lesser Polish shift of initial chf > kf is present: kfila (chwila). Many other consonant clusters typical of Lesser Polish dialects are also present. In the south, realizations of rś-, rź- instead of śr-, źr- can be found, as in other Lesser Polish dialects: przer-ziadło (przeźradło (lustro)), rziódło (źródło), rsioda (środa).

== Inflection ==
Both Lesser Polish and Masovian tendencies can be seen in the inflection of this dialect.

=== Nouns ===
In the north-west the instrumental plural ending -ami hardens to -amy also as a result of Masovian influence: pienindzmy (pieniędzmi). Some nouns have grammatical gender different than in Standard Polish. There is a preference for -a as the masculine genitive singular ending over -u. An archaic genitive singular -e is kept in feminine soft-stem nouns: do studnie (do studni). -ów is often used as a genitive plural ending regardless of gender alongside -∅ in the feminine and neuter.

=== Adjectives, adverbs, pronouns, and numerals ===
The comparative of adverbs may be -y/-i due to sound changes. The dative forms naju, waju of my, wy can still be seen here. The pronoun ten may take the masculine/neuter genitive singular form tégo in Janów Lubelski i Biłgoraj, resulting from Masovian influence. Adjectives, pronouns, and numerals may sometimes take -e (from *-ę) in the feminine accusative singular in the eastern edge, as in nouns: szyło sie damskie bielizne (szyło się damską bieliznę). They may also take -ech/-éch in the genitive plural, as in Masovia and other Western Lubelszczyzna: téch dobréch (tych dobrych).

=== Verbs ===
i and y may lower before l, ł in past tense forms: beli (byli), beło (było). In the south, they may go to u in the same circumstances: buł (był), piuł (pił). Many verbs ending in -ać with -eję declension sometimes see levelling in the past tense in the north east: zaleli (zalali). This does not occur elsewhere. The past tense of żąć was levelled by analogy to the present tense, also with possible contamination with the verb rżnąć: żnęłam (żęłam). Many verbs across the whole region that normally end in -eć may end in -ić, which may also be seen in Masovian dialects: powedzić (powiedzieć). In the first person plural present, past, and imperative forms of verbs, -(ź)wa may be seen: byliźwa (byliśmy), chodźwa (chodźmy). In Bychawa and Kraśnik, it can even retain its original function as a dual marker, and -(ś)my is used for the plural. In the edges of this region -wa and -ma (resulting from contamination between -my and -wa) can be seen: wozima (wozimy). At the eastern edge -m for the first person present/past/future plural, from Masovian influence, can be seen: wozim (wozimy). In the west, the first person plural present, past, and imperative forms of verbs ending -(ś)ta is common alongside standard -cie: mota (macie). -(ś)ta may also serve as a formal ending, where most dialects use -cie for formality: dajta, mamo. The third person plural may also be used as a form of respect: dziadek przynosili słómy snop (dziadek przynosił snop słomy). In the east, analytic past tenses are often formed: my trzęśli (trzęśliśmy). In the northeast, synthetic forms occur, and synthetic forms are less common in the east. The third person singular present tense of być is je, as opposed to Standard Polish jest. In the east, iść and its prefixed derivatives can take a masculine third person singular past tense form influenced by Eastern Slavic languages: poszeł (poszedł). Verbs ending in -ąć typically take -n- in the past tense: wypłynena (wypłynęła), but in the far north-east standard forms occur. Passive participles may also differ: łobgnite (obgniłe).

== Vocabulary ==
=== Word-Formation ===
Both Lesser Polish and Masovian word-formation tendencies can be seen here.

==== Nouns ====
Nouns formed with both -ę and -ak for young people and animals are common here. -yna is a common, expressive suffix here to imply a given object is old and not in good condition: łóżcyna (old and tired bed), from łóżko. Diminutives are sometimes used for this purpose as well, along with the standard, positive connotations.

==== Adjectives, adverbs, pronouns, and numerals ====
Adverbs are sometimes formed differently than in Standard Polish: normalno (normalnie). Numerals under 5 often govern the genitive plural: dwa pópłónycków (dwa podpłomyczki), dwie wiunchów (dwie wiąchy(wiązki)); conversely numerals above five may not govern the genitive plural: pińć kilumetry (pięć kilometrów).

==== Verbs ====
Frequentatives are typically formed with -ywać/-iwać from Masovian influence; in most of Lesser Poland -ować dominates. In parts of the eastern region -uwać is common. Verbs formed from -jąć form the frequentative with -ać, and not -ować: wyjmało sie (wyjmowało się).

== Syntax ==
Masculine personal nouns generally take the so-called “deprecative” forms neutrally: dziadki (dziadkowie). Similarly, the plural past tense is usually formed with -ły, regardless of gender: łojcowie zaprosiły (ojcowie zaprosili). However, in Giełczew and Stare Komaszyce, -li can still be found in the first person plural past tense regularly: my tak sie śmioli (tak się śmialiśmy), sadziliśmy (sadzaliśmy), or rarely in the third person plural. In the north, however, -li is preferred for all genders: byli takie ruzmaite kwiatki (były takie rozmaite kwiatki).

== See also ==
- Dialects of the Polish language
- Languages of Europe
- Polish language
