= Przemyśl dialect =

Dialect of Polish spoken in Poland

- Native to: Poland
- Region: Przemyśl
- Language family: Indo-European: Balto-Slavic; Slavic; West Slavic; Lechitic; Polish; Lesser Polish; Przemyśl dialect

Language codes
- ISO 639-3: –

The Przemyśl dialect (Polish: gwary przemyskie) belongs to the Lesser Poland dialect group and is located in the southeastern part of Poland. It borders the Biecz dialect to the west, the Lasovia dialect to the northwest, the Eastern Lublin dialect to the northeast, and the Southern Borderlands dialect to the east.

The Przemyśl dialect is close physically and linguistically to the Eastern Lublin dialect as well as the Southern Borderlands dialect, sharing less with the nearby Goral dialects. Eastern Slavic, namely Ukrainian, has had a strong influence on this dialect, and is often considered a dialect of the Southern Borderlands dialect group. After World War 2, the population of this region has changed much, with fewer Ukrainians, Lemkos, and Bojkos. Dialectal traits here are generally inconsistent, often with many exceptions.

== Phonology ==
Typical of Lesser Polish dialects, voicing of word-final consonants before vowels and liquids is present here. However, atypical of Lesser Polish dialects, mazuration is not present here.

=== Vowels ===
As in the Lubelszczyzna dialects, unaccented e and o, including those from ę/ą often raise either to é/ó or merge with y (after hard consonants), i (after soft consonants)/u: cepém (cepem), tówary (towary); przyd wybuchym (przed wybuchem), wszyski (wszystkie), ściliłu sie (ścieliło się); mę́czyli (męczyli), sųsiadki (sąsiadki). This feature is inconsistent, and even within one word multiple instances of unaccented e/o may partially raise, fully raise, or not raise. e and o may also sometimes raise before nasal consonants to y/i and u: Bużegu Naródzynia (Bożego Narodzenia), du świncynia (do święcenia), zrubiune (zrobiony). y can rarely front to [ɪ] due to Ukrainian influence. Ablaut is typically retained here: niosę (niosę). -ił, -ył can raise to -uł in Ostrów, przychodziuł (przychodził), djabuł (diabeł). This does not happen in Kalników. Unlike other Lesser Polish dialects, -aj remains -aj here: dzisiaj (dzisiaj). However, -ej often raises to -yj/-ij, usually as the result of being unstressed, and can sometimes further reduce to -y/-i: pracy taki zaróbkowy (pracy takiej zarobkowej). This is also inconsistent, and unreduced forms are more common.

==== Slanted vowels ====
Slanted á is usually merged with a; in the south-west, however, it is sometimes realized as o or retained as á, with Sanok being the furthest extent of this. Slanted é can be raised closer to [e ɪ] or merge with y/i (after soft consonants), and the old clusters ir/yr are retained through analogy, or more commonly é merges with e as in Standard Polish. Slanted ó is raised to u.

==== Nasal vowels ====
ę can often either partially or fully raise to y̨ (after hard consonants) or to į (after soft consonants). ą less commonly raises to ų. Nasal vowels also often decompose, including before sibilants as well as word-finally: wolisz fajken czy kawen (wolisz fajkę czy kawę), proszem paniom (proszę panią), którom (którą). Final -ą may additionally denasalize: chodzo (chodzą). This denasalized -o may further raise to -u: pud kuchniu (pod kuchnią). Finally, nasal vowels may change to eł, oł: soł (są). Final -ę denasalizes to -e. True nasal pronunciation of nasal vowels is rare here.

==== Prothesis ====
o and u, both initial and medial, sometimes labialize to ô and û here, but inconsistently. Other forms of initial prothesis before vowels are limited to specific words.

=== Consonants ===
As a result of Ukrainian influence, f and w may rarely be pronounced bilabially as [ɸ β], and sometimes w is voiced after a voiceless consonant, but may also be devoiced. Partial decomposition of soft labials is present here, but more commonly soft labials are pronounced as in the standard. Because of Ukrainian influence, dark ł can be heard here, but also Standard Polish /w/. Similarly, soft l’ can also be heard alongside l: nalieżał (należał), sklep (sklep). In the east, the cluster chy- is often chi-: chiba (chyba). Also as a result of Ukrainian influence, h represents a different phone than ch, that being [ɦ] and [x] respectively. This is a marginal phone, appearing only in a few words. ń can harden before c and cz alongside standard pronunciation as a result of Ukrainian influence: łancuch (łańcuch), konczyć (kończyć). n before k assimilates and becomes [ŋ] across morpheme boundaries. trz, drz sometimes simplify to cz, dż, but more commonly are retained. Many other consonant clusters can be reduced: zmar (zmarł), barsz (barszcz), including kk > k or > tk: mięki, leki; miętki, letki (miękki, lekki). The group kt is often changed to cht: chtoś (ktoś).

== Inflection ==
Eastern Slavic influence can be seen in the inflection of this dialect.

=== Nouns ===
Masculine personal as a gender is often changed to masculine animal: muzykanty (muzykanci), ludzie niprzytomne (ludzie nieprzytomni), but the plural past tense -li is used for non-virile plurals as well: czołgi jechali (czołgi jechały), or non-virile agreement: chłopy tańcowały (chłopi tańcowali). This change is rare, and generally standard agreement is used. A few nouns differ in gender than in Standard Polish. Many feminine nouns that normally end in -i in the nominative singular are extended with -a here: gospodynia (gospodyni). Some masculine personal nominative plural forms are modelled on the form bracia, a historically collective form: kumyndiańcia (komedianci). -am is used as the dative plural ending instead of Standard Polish -om: dziwczynkam (dziewczynkom) as a result of Ukrainian influence. Standard -om occurs more frequently, however.

=== Adjectives, adverbs, pronouns, and numerals ===
The comparative of adverbs as well as the feminine genitive/locative singular of adjectives, pronouns, and numerals may rarely be -yj/-ij or -y/-i due to sound changes. Adjectives (including adjectival pronouns and numerals) in the masculine singular nominative may end in -yj/-ij from Ukrainian influence. Adjectives in the genitive/dative/locative feminine singular can end in ‑i/‑y: pracy taki zaróbkowy (pracy takiej zarobkowej); however, standard -(i)ej is more common. Adjectives, pronouns, and numerals may sometimes take -e (from *-ę) in the feminine accusative singular in the eastern edge alongside standard -ą, as in nouns: miał te rączke dłuższe (miał tę rączkę dłuższą). On occasion, adjectives in the locative/instrumental masculine/neuter singular may end in -em alongside standard -im: z takim ukrągłem (z takim okrągłym), w jednem kóliorze (w jedym kolorze). Adjectives in the dative plural sometimes take -em alongside standard -ym: przypominać młodem (przypominać młodym). Numerals in the genitive sometimes take -och: ud cztérnastoch lat (od czternastu lat).

=== Verbs ===
The past tense may be formed with -uł instead of -ył/-ił due to sound changes. The third person singular present tense of być is je alongside Standard Polish jest. Verbs in the past tense and the conditional mood may be formed without personal clitics, but with personal pronouns instead: jak my tu byli (jak tu byliśmy). Forms with personal clitics may also occur: młóciłam (młóciłam). On occasion personal clitics may be attached to że to form a past tense: żem dziecióm upisała pisanke (dzieciom opisałam pisankę). Verbs ending in -ąć typically take -n- in the past tense: zaczeno sie (zaczęło się). Standard forms also occur: wzięła (wzięła). Verbs ending in -nąć in the infinitive often do not have -ną-, -nę- in the past tense: sie wyciągłu (się wyciągnęło).

== Vocabulary ==
=== Word-Formation ===
Eastern Slavic influence can be seen in the word-formation of this dialect.

==== Nouns ====
Personal names ar diminutized with Ukrainian -ko: Jóźko, which can sometimes sound as Jóźku due to reduction. Many diminutatives are formed with -cia, and -icha/-ycha in feminine surnames.

==== Adjectives, adverbs, pronouns, and numerals ====
Adjectives are sometimes formed differently than in the standard: tylni (tylny). -owaty occurs in places it might not otherwise in Standard Polish: durnowaty (durny).

==== Verbs ====
Frequentatives are typically formed with -ować or -uwać as in Lesser Poland -ować dominates where in Standard Polish -ywać/-iwać is used: pusypuwana/pusypuwać (posypywana/posypywać). Verbs often take two prefixes: dzieci sie puruzliciały (> porozlecieć) (dzieci się rozbiegły).

== Syntax ==
Numerals under 5 often govern the genitive plural: dwa synów (dwóch synów), dwie córek (dwie córki); conversely numerals above five may not govern the genitive plural: pięć hektary (pięć hektarów). However, Standard Polish agreement also occurs. Adjectives used predicatively are often in the instrumental: ludzie są wrażliwymi (ludzie są wrażliwi).

== See also ==
- Dialects of the Polish language
- Languages of Europe
- Polish language
