= Eastern Lublin dialect =

Dialect of Polish spoken in Poland

- Native to: Poland
- Region: Southeastern Lesser Poland
- Language family: Indo-European: Balto-Slavic; Slavic; West Slavic; Lechitic; Polish; Lesser Polish; Eastern Lublin dialect

Language codes
- ISO 639-3: –

The Eastern Lublin dialect (Polish: gwary lubelszczyzny wschodniej) belongs to the Lesser Poland dialect group and is located in the part of Poland. It borders the Western Lublin dialect to the west, the Lasovia dialect to the southwest, the Przemyśl dialect to the south, the Southern Borderlands dialect to the east, the Northern Borderlands dialect to the northeast, the Masovian Podlachia dialect to the north, and the Near Mazovian dialect to the northwest.

Both Western Lubelszczyzna and Przemyskie are relatively young dialects with Eastern Slavic influence, as many people from Lesser Poland and Masovia colonized this Ruthenian region between the 15th and 18th centuries. Given the position of the dialect, the Southern Borderlands dialect acted as a foundation for this dialect, which means that many typical Lesser Polish traits here have been levelled. Due to this, this dialect has often been consider more close to the Southern Borderlands dialect. These eastern influences are what separate Eastern Lubelszczyzna from Western. Eastern Lubelszczyzna and Przemyska have much in common. As a result of this admixture of dialects, this region can be dividing into multiple areas depending on the intensity of influences. There is a northern area, a central area, a south western area, and a south eastern area, where areas to the west share some features with Western Lubelszczyzna.

== Phonology ==
Atypical of Lesser Polish dialects, devoicing of word-final consonants before vowels and liquids is present here. Voicing can sporadically be seen. Devoicing also occurs more often before clitics, but voicing can sporadically occur here as well. Consonants may voice before clitics in the south, otherwise devoicing occurs also before clitics. Also atypical of Lesser Polish dialects, mazuration is not present here, except in a few villages, which were colonized late by speakers with mazuration.

=== Vowels ===
Sometimes ablaut is levelled: ruzniesła (rozniosła), but more commonly it is not. Unaccented e often raises to é or y (after hard consonants) or i (after soft consonants) and unaccented o often raises to ó/u: zybrało (zebrało), masłu (masło). This raising is inconsistent, and occurs more in unaccented syllables before a stress, and less after. Unaccented nasal vowels can undergo a similar raising. i before ł ([w]) can back: łudcedziuło sie (odcedziło się). A few instances of Masovian -ar- > -er- can be found. A few instances of word-final -aj > -ej are also found: dzisiej (dzisiaj), tutej (tutaj). Similarly, word-final -ej can raise to y (after hard consonants)/i (after soft consonants): dłuży (dłużej), dali (dalej). -e- is sometimes inserted between consonant clusters: wiater (wiatr), usechła (uschła), as in other Lesser Polish dialects. y can sometimes front to [ɪ], especially when stressed, due to Ukrainian influence.

==== Slanted vowels ====
Slanted á is merged with a, as in Standard Polish, but in the west and part of the central area slanted á is sometimes raised to o, or in a few villages, kept as á. Slanted é is raised to y (after hard consonants) or i (after soft consonants); the groups yr or yrz, ir or irz are not lowered. Slanted é is also often lowered to e due to influence from Standard Polish. Slanted ó is raised to u.

==== Nasal vowels ====
Nasal ą is sometimes raised to ų, and ę can be raised to ę́. Medial nasal vowels may decompose before both sibilants and non-sibilants, even sometimes in careful speech. Sometimes nasal vowels may also change to oł, eł: mołke (mąkę), as the result of Ukrainian influence. Future forms of to be can exceptionally be denasalized: bedzie (będzie). Final -ą most often denasalizes to -o: z Wigilio (z Wigilią), przychodzo (przychodzą), but a Standard Polish pronunciation can be heard as well. Final -ę denasalizes to -e, and when unstressed can also raise. A few words have secondary nasalization. The groups eN and oN (also resulting from decomposition of nasal vowels) can be raised to é/y (after hard consonants), i (after soft consonants) and ó/u: Bóżego Naródzénia (Bożego Narodzenia), piniundz (pieniądz).

==== Prothesis ====
Initial o- and u- often labialize to ô- and û-, as in other Lesser Polish dialects. This feature exists as a gradient, being stronger in the west and weaker in the east.

=== Consonants ===
As a result of Ukrainian influence, f and w may be pronounced bilabially as [ɸ β], and sometimes w is voiced after a voiceless consonant, particularly in the east. In the west, w is strictly devoiced after voiceless consonants. The west also sometimes partially decomposes soft bilabial consonants. Sometimes ś, ź, ć, and dź are pronounced as soft s’, z’, c’, and dz’ ([sʲ zʲ t͡sʲ d͡zʲ]), often alongside the standard pronunciation. This is rare or even non-existent in some western regions. Dark ł is retained here as a result of Ukrainian influence, and also soft l’. However, standard pronunciations of both consonants can also be heard. Also as a result of Ukrainian influence, h represents a different phoneme than ch, that being /ɦ/ and /x/ respectively, but only in surnames. In the east, it is common for chy to shift to chi: suchi (suchy). In the center, k’ and g’ are sometimes pronounced as k, g due to Masovian influence: druge (drugie), take (takie). ń can harden before c and cz: łancuch (łańcuch), konczyć (kończyć). kt usually shifts to cht: chtoś (ktoś). szl often softens to szl’: posz’li (poszli). Many consonant clusters are reduced: initial gdź > dź: dzieś (gdzieś); medial -rnk- > -rk-: ziarko (ziarnko); final -tł, -zł, -kł, -gł, -sł, -zł, -rł in the past tense of verbs > -t, -d, -k, -g, -s, -z, -r: szed (szedł). Some instances of changes in individual words are also noted: chrz > krz: krzan (chrzan); k > g: wielgi (wielki).

== Inflection ==
Traits typical of Lesser Polish, Masovian, as well as Eastern Slavic languages can be seen in the inflection.

=== Nouns ===
In the east, feminine nouns ending in -cha, -ha sometimes take -se, -ze in the dative and locative singular: muse (musze, from mucha) as a result of Ukrainian influence. Some feminine nouns are extended with -a in the nominative: guspudynia (gospodyni), mysza (mysz), brukwa (brukiew). -ów is often used as the genitive plural ending regardless of gender, and may be extended to soft-stem masculine nouns as well: talerzów (talerzy). -∅ may also occur in feminine and neuter nouns. -am is used as the dative plural ending instead of Standard Polish -om: dziwczynkam (dziewczynkom) as a result of Ukrainian influence. This feature is one that distinguishes Eastern Lubelszczyzna from Western. -om/-óm may also occur.

=== Adjectives, adverbs, pronouns, and numerals ===
The comparative of adverbs may be formed with -y/-i due to sound changes. On occasion, pronouns taking adjectival declension and adjectives can take noun-like declensions: któro (które). Adjectives in the masculine singular nominative may end in -yj/-ij from Ukrainian influence, but this is uncommon. Adjectives, pronouns, and numerals may sometimes take -e (from *-ę) in the feminine accusative singular in the eastern edge, as in nouns: śmitane gęste take (śmietanę gęstą taką). The instrumental/locative masculine/neuter singular of adjectives, pronouns, and numerals may be -em alongside standard -ym: całem tym sznurkiem (całym tym sznurkiem). The genitive plural of adjectives, pronouns, and numerals may be realized as -éch, as in Masovia and Western Lubelszczyzna, but -ych is more common. The instrumental plural of adjectives, pronouns, and numerals may be -emi: temi kiczkami (tymi kiczkami), probably as the result of prenasal lowering of y only in this inflectional ending. The numeral trzy may take trzoch alongside standard trzech as a genitive plural form: z trzoch gatunki zboże było (z trzech gatunków zboże było). It may also tak trzoma as the instrumental plural alongside standard trzema: z trzoma królami (z trzema królami).

=== Verbs ===
The past tense may be formed with -uł instead of -ył/-ił due to sound changes. Many infinitives formed with -eć are formed with -ić here: siedzić (siedzieć). This is likely the result of analogy with verbs such as robić, or less likely could be the result of raising unaccented e. The first person plural present/future of verbs is often formed with -m: dostajem (dostajemy), bedziem (będziemy). The past tense of verbs is often formed analytically without clitics: my szyli (szyliśmy), or synthetically with clitics. Clitics here are more mobile than in Standard Polish: wyszłam (wyszłam), wzajemnieśmy sie bili (biliśmy się wzajemnie). Many verbs ending in -ać with -eję declension sometimes see levelling in the past tense: lieli (lali). The third person singular present tense of być is je, as opposed to Standard Polish jest. Verbs ending in -nąć in the infinitive often do not have -ną-, -nę- in the past tense: pachła sie (pachniała). Verbs ending in -ąć typically take -n- in the past tense: wzion (wziął) in the east.

== Vocabulary ==
=== Word-Formation ===
Traits typical of Lesser Polish, Masovian, as well as Eastern Slavic languages can be seen in the word-formation.

==== Nouns ====
Nouns formed with both -ę and -ak for young people and animals are common here. Double diminutives are common here. Historically, -uk could attach to a surname to mean “son of” as a result of Ukrainian influence: Semeniuk. This is quickly fading. Also historically, -icha/-ycha meaning “wife of” was more common, but is also fading: Czubicha (Czuba's wife), kowalicha (wife of a smith). -ka also serves a similar purpose: Salaczka (Salak's wife). In the east, the suffixes -(ow)inie/-ynie may be attached to vegetables to mean “leaves/shoots of”: marchwinie (leaves of a carrot).

==== Adjectives, adverbs, pronouns, and numerals ====
-uni, an expressive adjectival suffix of Ukrainian origin, may be attached to adjectives to add intensity and expressiveness: mały > maluni. -eńki serves a similar purpose here.

==== Verbs ====
Frequentatives are typically formed with -ywać/-iwać from Masovian influence; in most of Lesser Poland -ować dominates. In parts of the central region -ować can be seen. Verbs formed from -jąć form the frequentative with -ać, and not -ować: sie zdejma (się zdejmuje).

== Syntax ==
Masculine personal as a gender is often changed to masculine animal: kawaliery (kawalerowie), ludzie niprzytomne (ludzie nieprzytomni), but the plural past tense -li is used for non-virile plurals as well: panienki brali (panienki brały). Similarly, numerals may use non-virile agreement: siedem chłopców (siedmiu chłopców). Numerals under 5 often govern the genitive plural: trzy córek (trzy córki); conversely numerals above five may not govern the genitive plural: siedem hektary (siedem hektarów). However, Standard Polish agreement also occurs.

== See also ==
- Dialects of the Polish language
- Languages of Europe
- Polish language
