= Podegrodzie dialect =

Dialect of Polish spoken in Poland

- Native to: Poland
- Region: Podegrodzie
- Language family: Indo-European: Balto-Slavic; Slavic; West Slavic; Lechitic; Polish; Lesser Polish; Podegrodzie dialect

Language codes
- ISO 639-3: –

The Podegrodzie dialect (Polish: gwara podegródzka) belongs to the Lesser Poland dialect group and is located in the part of Poland. It borders the Krakow dialect to the northwest, the Eastern Krakow dialect to the northeast, the Biecz dialect to the east, the Piwniczna dialect to the southeast, and the Łącko dialect to the southwest. The region is generally split into east and west, and is characterized by having one reflex of the nasal vowels in three regions. Some residents here often do not consider themselves Gorals, but Lachs (Sącz Lachs), particularly in the Podegrodzie region. Others consider themselves Gorals. Historically, Lemkos were also found here. Sądecka is considered a transitional dialect between Goral dialects and sub-Krakovian (Krakowskie) dialects, and features from this region have spread to many nearby regions, namely the feature that ę and ą have merged into nasal ǫ, which is then denasalized.

== Phonology ==
Typical of Lesser Polish dialects (as well as Greater Polish dialects), voicing of word-final consonants before vowels and liquids is present here. Also typical of Lesser Polish dialects is the presence of masuration, but this is often inconsisent, and in recent times this process has been slowly undone. Initial accent can be heard in some Goral regions of the area, but is rare.

=== Vowels ===
Final -ył/-ił often shifts to -uł (with many realization), not only tautosyllabically. A shift of -eł- > -oł- is also present in a few words: wołna (instead of wełna). This feature is inconsistent, happening the most frequently in Pisarzowa.

==== Slanted vowels ====
Before World War II, slanted á, é, and ó were still present and had not yet merged, with a tendency to merge á > o. However, by the 21st century, they had merged, so á > o, and é > y (after both hard and soft consonants). Slanted ó, on the other hand, is retained, often realized as [o] or [ʊ].

==== Nasal vowels ====
Before World War II, nasal ę was often lowered (less commonly raised) to nasal æ̨, and ą was that of Standard Polish (ǫ). sometimes raised. At this time, nasality was usually retained, and nasal vowels were not decomposed before non-sibilants, or sometimes complete denasalization, especially ǫ, or ǫ word-finally decomposed to -om. Similarly to ę, the group eN also lowered to aN, often nasalizing a, whereas a (jasne)N was realized as ąN with nasalization of the vowel, which sometimes raised further to e or ąᵒ, and finally > oN, but á (slanted)N > ąᵒN, ǫN, ǫᵘN > oN. Other reflexes are found, with oN being the most common, or a pronunciation as in Standard Polish. A few years later (1966, 1975), the tendency to merge the two nasals and then denasalize them had already begun in three islands: a region bordering Silesia, a region to the northeast of Żywiec, and a region to the south of Myślenice reaching Limanowa. -ę (and its reflexes) can sometimes still be heard. Denasalization can occur regardless of the following consonant. The reflexes of denasalization are varied, with o being the most common. -ą can become -om only in the instrumental singular of feminine nouns, in other inflections -o is most common. Pronunciation as in Standard Polish (with decomposition, but also raising) can also be found. In short, the nasal vowels and groups eN, aN merged with o(N) by the 21st century, but pronunciations as in Standard Polish can still be found.

==== Prothesis ====
Initial o and rarely u as well as o and (rarely) u after labials and velars typically labialize to ô and û. Other forms of initial prothesis are present, but limited to particular words.

=== Consonants ===
-ch- can be lost: jeać (jechać), and -ch and change to -k, mainly in inflections, and not as much in stems. It is common to geminate s and ś here: z lassu, w leśsie. Often word-final final (or syllable-final) -ń shifts to -j: dziej (dzień). Final -ść, -źć simplify to -ś, -ź and strz, zdrz, trz, drz simplify to szcz, żdż, cz, dż. ślń is simplified to śśń, rnc to rz, gdź to dź, ndn to nn, and stn (stń) to sn (śń): maśnicce (maselniczce), gorcek (garnczek), dzie (gdzie), porzonnie (porządnie), chrzesny (chrzestny).

== Inflection ==
As a result of sound changes, many inflections are different, which means that many of these are recent innovations since the 20th century.

=== Nouns ===
-o is now used also for the accusative and instrumental singular of feminine nouns. -o, -om, and -em are used for the instrumental singular of masculine nouns. -ami is typically -omi. -e as the genitive singular of soft feminine nouns is quite common: do studnie.

=== Adjectives, adverbs, pronouns, and numerals ===
Word-final -ej of the comparative of adverbs and genitive/dative/locative feminine singular of adjectives shifts to -i (after soft consonants)/-y (after hard consonants).

=== Verbs ===
The past tense can be formed with -uł instead of -ił/-ył due to sound changes. Often ablaut in conjugations is levelled: niesły (niosły). Final -ł is lost in masculine past tense forms with -k, g, d, t, s, z-: mók (mógł). -o is used as the third person plural present and future tense of verbs: majo (mają). The past tense may be formed with a personal pronoun and an l-form without a personal clitic: jo myśloł, or less commonly with personal clitics: płojechołem (pojechałem), often with the personal pronoun alongside the clitic. The personal clitic has a stronger tendency to attach to words other than the verb than in Standard Polish. -my can be seen alongside -śmy (przyjezdzałymy) in the first person plural past tense.

=== Prepositions and prefixes ===
Common is the extension of the prepositions w, z with mobile e to we, ze when before a word starting with a consonant of the same place of articulation.

== Vocabulary ==
=== Word-Formation ===
Many typical Lower Polish word-formation tendencies are common here.

==== Adjectives, adverbs, pronouns, and numerals ====
Indefinite pronouns are often formed with -si or -sik: ktosi, cosik as well as -ok: tutok (tutaj).

==== Verbs ====
Frequentative verbs are often formed with -uwać where in Standard Polish would be -ywać/-iwać.

== Syntax ==
Often masculine-animal forms are used in place of masculine-personal forms: chłopy musiały skubać.

== See also ==
- Dialects of the Polish language
- Languages of Europe
- Polish language
