= Eastern Kraków dialect =

Dialect of Polish spoken in Poland

- Native to: Poland
- Region: Central Lesser Poland
- Language family: Indo-European: Balto-Slavic; Slavic; West Slavic; Lechitic; Polish; Lesser Polish; Eastern Kraków dialect

Language codes
- ISO 639-3: –

The dialect belongs to the Lesser Poland dialect group and is located in the southern part of Poland. It borders the Kielce dialect to the north, the Lasovia dialect to the east, the Biecz dialect to the southeast, the Podegrodzie dialect to the south, and the Kraków dialect to the west.

== Phonology ==
Typical of Lesser Polish dialects (as well as Greater Polish dialects), voicing of word-final consonants before vowels and liquids is present here. Also typical of Lesser Polish dialects is the presence of mazuration, but this is often inconsistent, and in recent times this process has been slowly undone, but is still relatively well maintained.

=== Vowels ===
-ył(-), -ił(-) often shifts to -uł. Proto-Slavic *ьr developed as ir here: sirpem. Often ablaut is levelled: ramienach (ramionach). In Śmigno, sometimes o shifts to e: chłep, debre.

==== Slanted vowels ====
Slanted é was retained as é, but now has since raised to y after any consonant in the 21st century. Slanted á was retained as á, but has since raised to o in the 21st century. Slanted ó was retained as ó, but has since risen to u in the 21st century. Sometimes a preference for jasne vowels can be seen via analogy: noszka (per noga).

==== Nasal vowels ====
Final nasals can either be kept nasal: dzieją: siedzę; or denasalize: dadzo. -ą can also decompose: matkom. ę medially can denasalize, especially before sibilants: meża, wos, or most commonly nasals can decompose medially except before sibilants: porzondek, ksiendza, and denasalization of final -ę and decomposition of final -ą > -om is most common as well.

==== Prothesis ====
Initial o labializes to ô, as well as after labials and velars, and initial i often has prothetic j- added.

=== Consonants ===
Final -ch often shifts to -k. and medial -ch- in some clusters as well. Initial chr- shifts to kr-. The clusters trz, drz shift to cz, dż. The group sł- can shift to sw-. Intervocalic ł is sometimes lost. Palatal consonants are often preceded or replaced by -j-. Near Tarnów, a shift of chw- > f- can sometimes be found. Often kt metathesizes to tk: tko, tkóry, or ft: fto. Verbs ending in -ść, -źć lose final -ć and become -ś, -ź. Often s is geminated: do lassu, w leśsie or then dissimilated: w leście. This is not consistent, nor across the whole area. Typically Old Polish śrz-, źrz develops as śr, źr.

=== Contraction ===
Contracted forms of verbs is common here, as in Standard Polish.

== Inflection ==
Typical Lesser Polish inflectional tendencies can be found here alongside some Masovian influences.

=== Nouns ===
Often -ą is used instead of -ę for the accusative singular of feminine nouns. In Śmigno, -(a)my can be used instead of -(a)mi in the instrumental plural as the result of Masovian influence. -ów is usually used as the genitive plural ending, regardless of gender.

=== Adjectives, adverbs, pronouns, and numerals ===
Word-final -ej of the comparative of adverbs and genitive/dative/locative feminine singular of adjectives shifts to -i (after soft consonants)/-y (after hard consonants). -em is often used in the instrumental singular of masculine and neuter adjectives: całem (całym). Adjectives sometimes have the old instrumental dual ending -yma.

=== Verbs ===
The imperative -aj shifts to -ej. The past tense may be formed with -uł(-) or without ł due to sound changes. -yć/-ić is sometimes used instead of -eć. -śwa, -źwa, and -wa can be found in the past tense second person dual of verbs. lubić often takes -eć like conjugation in the past: lubieli. Often the plural is used as a respectful form.

=== Prepositions and prefixes ===
Common is the extension of the prepositions w, z with mobile e to we, ze when before a word starting with a consonant cluster.

== Syntax ==
Often masculine nouns take masculine animal declension, but masculine personal agreement: konie siekli, chodzili kolendniki.

== See also ==
- Dialects of the Polish language
- Languages of Europe
- Polish language
