= Sandomierz Forest =

Forest in Poland

Sandomierz Forest Polish: Puszcza Sandomierska
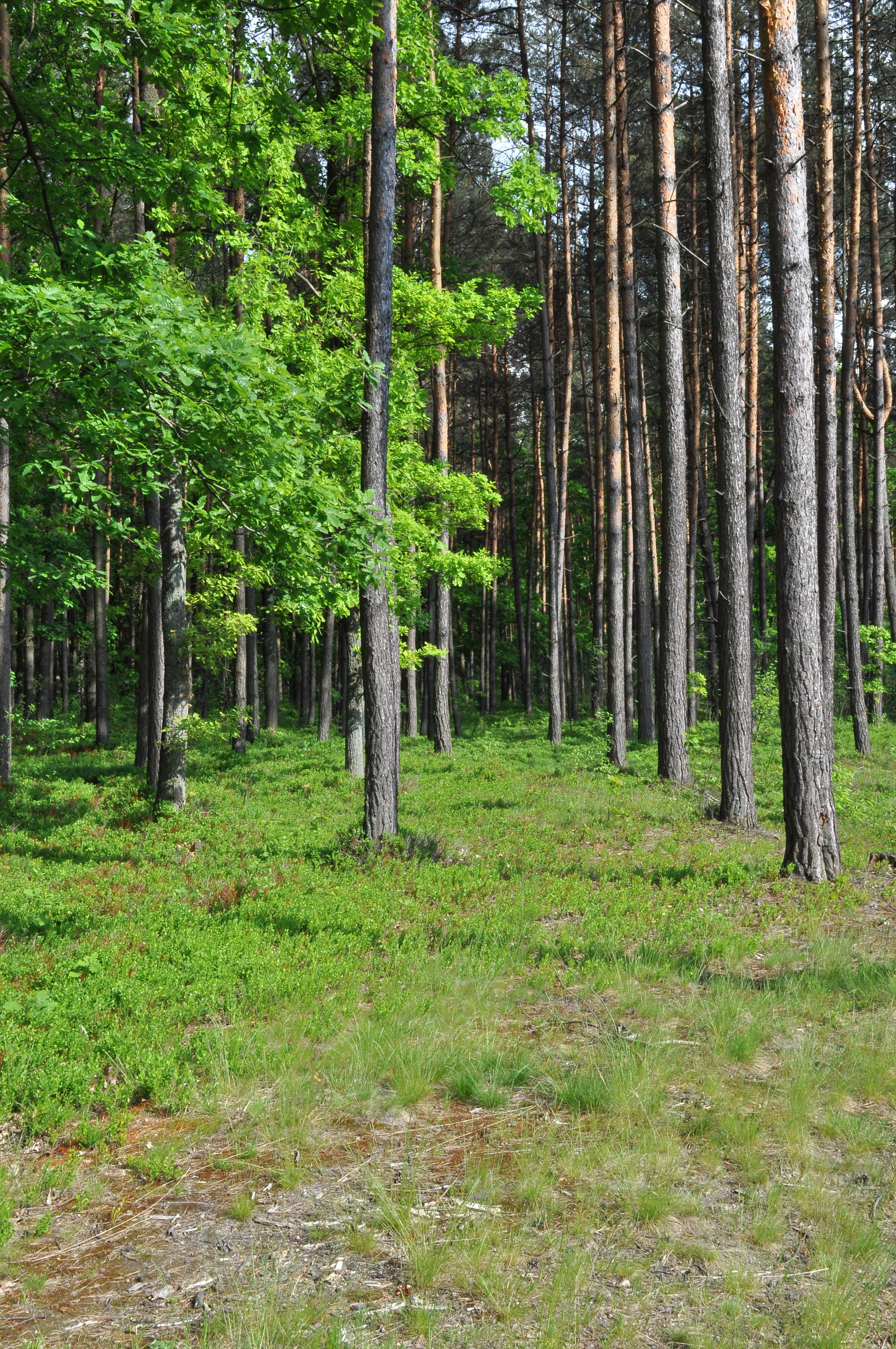
- Sandomierz Forest near Mielec
- Interactive map of Sandomierz Forest

Geography
- Location: Poland

Ecology
- Dominant tree species: pine, common oak

Sandomierz Forest (Polish: Puszcza Sandomierska) is one of the biggest forests in southern Poland; covering large parts of the Sandomierz Basin. Its name comes from the historical city of Sandomierz, and in the Middle Ages its eastern edge created a natural border between Lesser Poland and Red Ruthenia.

Currently, the once mighty wilderness, which once stretched from Kraków to Lviv, now extends from Tarnobrzeg in the north, to the suburbs of Rzeszów in the south. It is regarded as one of the wildest forested areas of Poland. Among animals living here, one can find various birds, deer, wild pigs, moles, foxes, wolves, snakes, various spiders and insects. The area of the forest is 129,115.6 hectares, and it is made mostly of pines. Currently, large parts of the forest are covered by the Natura 2000 network (Natura 2000 Puszcza Sandomierska PLB180005). Sandomierz Forest has several small rivers, with the largest one being the Łęg, a right tributary of the Vistula. The soil is mostly poor quality podzols. The boundary of the forest is marked by four rivers - the Vistula, the San, the Wisłoka, and the Wisłok. The forest lies within Subcarpathian Voivodeship; its northern part is located in Tarnobrzeg Plain, while in the south it lies in Kolbuszowa Plateau.

== History ==
The first modern settlements were established here between the 10th and 12th centuries. During the Mongol invasion of Poland and other Mongol/Tatar raids of the early Kingdom of Poland, residents of Lesser Poland escaped to the dense forest to save themselves from Asiatic hordes. Sandomierz Forest remained sparsely populated until the mid-14th century, when King Casimir III the Great initiated a program of mass settlement, founding several towns. In the 15th and 16th centuries, northern and central areas of the forest were settled by peasants from overpopulated province of Mazovia. In the 17th century, during the Swedish invasion of Poland, local residents again escaped to the forest from Swedish, Cossack, Tatar and Transilvanian invaders.

After the Partitions of Poland, the forest became part of newly formed Austrian Galicia. In the late 18th and early 19th centuries, Austrian government invited German-speaking settlers (the so-called Josephine colonization, after Joseph II, Holy Roman Emperor). The area turned into a melting pot, where ethnic Poles from Mazovia and Lesser Poland mixed with Germans, Ukrainians, Tatars, Jews, Wallachians and other nationalities. Several local villages were named after different ethnic groups: Rusiny, Moskale, Mazury, Wolochy, Szwedy, Turki, Tatary. In the late 19th century, inhabitants of the wilderness began to call themselves Lasowiacy (or Lesioki).
