= List of Indo-European languages =

An Indo-European language is the majority native language An Indo-European language is a co-official and majority native language An Indo-European language is an official but minority native language An Indo-European language is a cultural or secondary language An Indo-European language is not widely spoken

The approximate present-day distribution of the Indo-European branches within their homelands of Europe and Asia: Albanian Armenian Balto-Slavic (Baltic) Balto-Slavic (Slavic) Celtic Germanic Hellenic (Greek) Indo-Iranian (Indo-Aryan, Iranian, and Nuristani) Italic (Romance) Non-Indo-European languages Dotted/striped areas indicate where multilingualism is common.

Germanic languages in the world

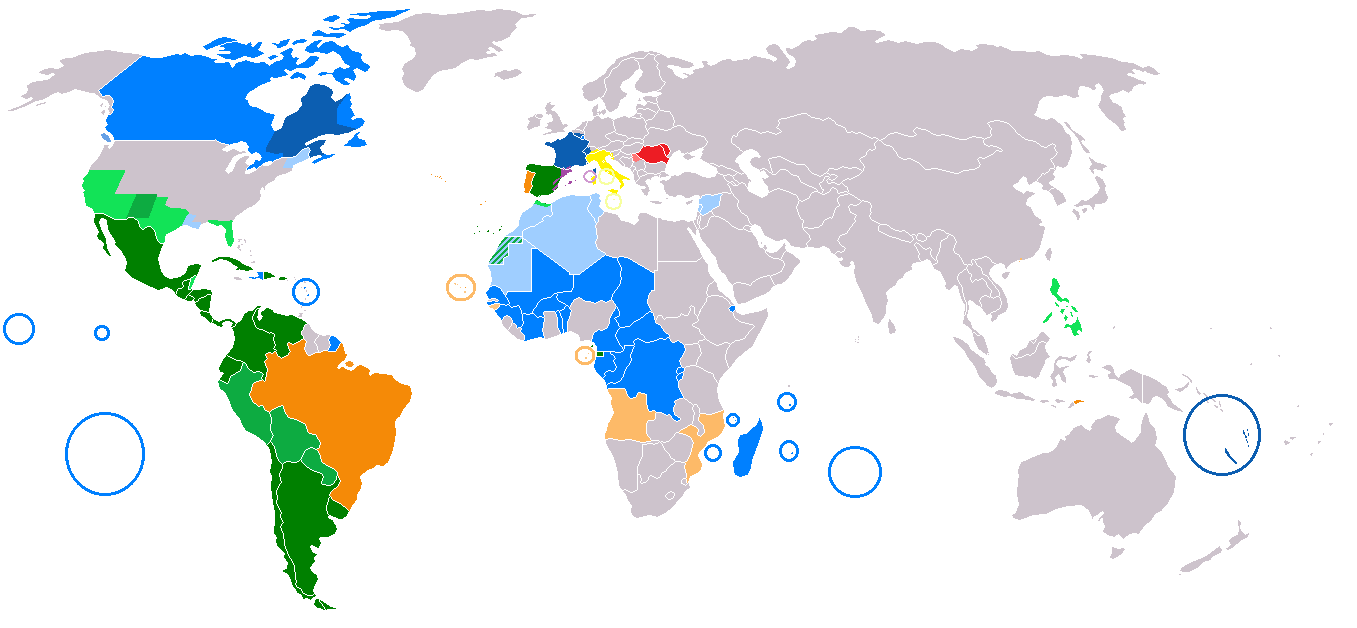
Romance languages in the world

This is a list of languages in the Indo-European language family. It contains a large number of individual languages, together spoken by roughly half the world's population.

== Numbers of languages and language groups ==
The Indo-European languages include some 449 (SIL estimate, 2018 edition) languages spoken by about 3.5 billion people or more (roughly half of the world population). Most of the major languages belonging to language branches and groups in Europe and western and southern Asia belong to the Indo-European language family. This is thus the biggest language family in the world by number of mother tongue speakers (but not by number of languages: by this measure it is only the 3rd or 5th biggest). Eight of the top ten biggest languages, by number of native speakers, are Indo-European. One of these languages, English, is the de facto world lingua franca, with an estimate of over one billion second language speakers. The Indo-European language family has 10 known branches or subfamilies, of which eight are living and two are extinct. Most of the subfamilies or linguistic branches in this list contain many subgroups and individual languages. The relationships between these branches (how they are related to one another and branched from the ancestral proto-language) are a matter of further research and not yet fully known. There are some individual Indo-European languages that are unclassified within the language family; they are not yet classified in a branch and could constitute a separate branch. The 449 Indo-European languages identified in the SIL estimate, 2018 edition, are mostly living languages. If all the known extinct Indo-European languages are added, they number more than 800 or close to one thousand. This list includes all known Indo-European languages, living and extinct.

== Definition of language ==
The distinction between a language and a dialect is not clear-cut and simple: in many areas there is a dialect continuum, with transitional dialects and languages. Further, there is no agreed standard criterion for what amount of differences in vocabulary, grammar, pronunciation and prosody are required to constitute a separate language, as opposed to a mere dialect. Mutual intelligibility can be considered, but there are closely related languages that are also mutual intelligible to some degree, even if it is an asymmetric intelligibility. Or there may be cases where between three dialects, A, B, and C, A and B are mutually intelligible, B and C are mutually intelligible, but A and C are not. In such circumstances grouping the three dielects becomes impossible. Because of this, in this list, several dialect groups and some individual dialects of languages are shown (in italics), especially if a language is or was spoken by a large number of people and over a large land area, but also if it has or had divergent dialects.

== Summary of historical development ==
The ancestral population and language, Proto-Indo-Europeans that spoke Proto-Indo-European, are estimated to have lived about 4500 BCE (6500 BP). At some point in time, starting about 4000 BCE (6000 BP), this population expanded through migration and cultural influence. This started a complex process of population blend or population replacement, acculturation and language change of peoples in many regions of western and southern Eurasia. This process gave origin to many languages and branches of this language family. By around 1000 BCE, there were many millions of Indo-European speakers, and they lived in a vast geographical area which covered most of western and southern Eurasia (including western Central Asia). In the following two millennia the number of speakers of Indo-European languages increased even further. Indo-European languages continued to be spoken in large land areas, although most of western Central Asia and Asia Minor were lost to other language families (mainly Turkic) due to Turkic expansion, conquests and settlement (after the middle of the first millennium AD and the beginning and middle of the second millennium AD respectively) and also to Mongol invasions and conquests (which changed Central Asia ethnolinguistic composition). Another land area lost to non-Indo-European languages was today's Hungary, due to Magyar/Hungarian (Uralic language speakers) conquest and settlement. However, from about AD 1500 onwards, Indo-European languages expanded their territories to North Asia (Siberia), through Russian expansion, and North America, South America, Australia and New Zealand as the result of the age of European discoveries and European conquests through the expansions of the Portuguese, Spanish, French, English and the Dutch. (These peoples had the biggest continental or maritime empires in the world and their countries were major powers.) The contact between different peoples and languages, especially as a result of European colonization, also gave origin to the many pidgins, creoles and mixed languages that are mainly based in Indo-European languages (many of which are spoken in island groups and coastal regions).

== Dating the split-offs of the main branches ==
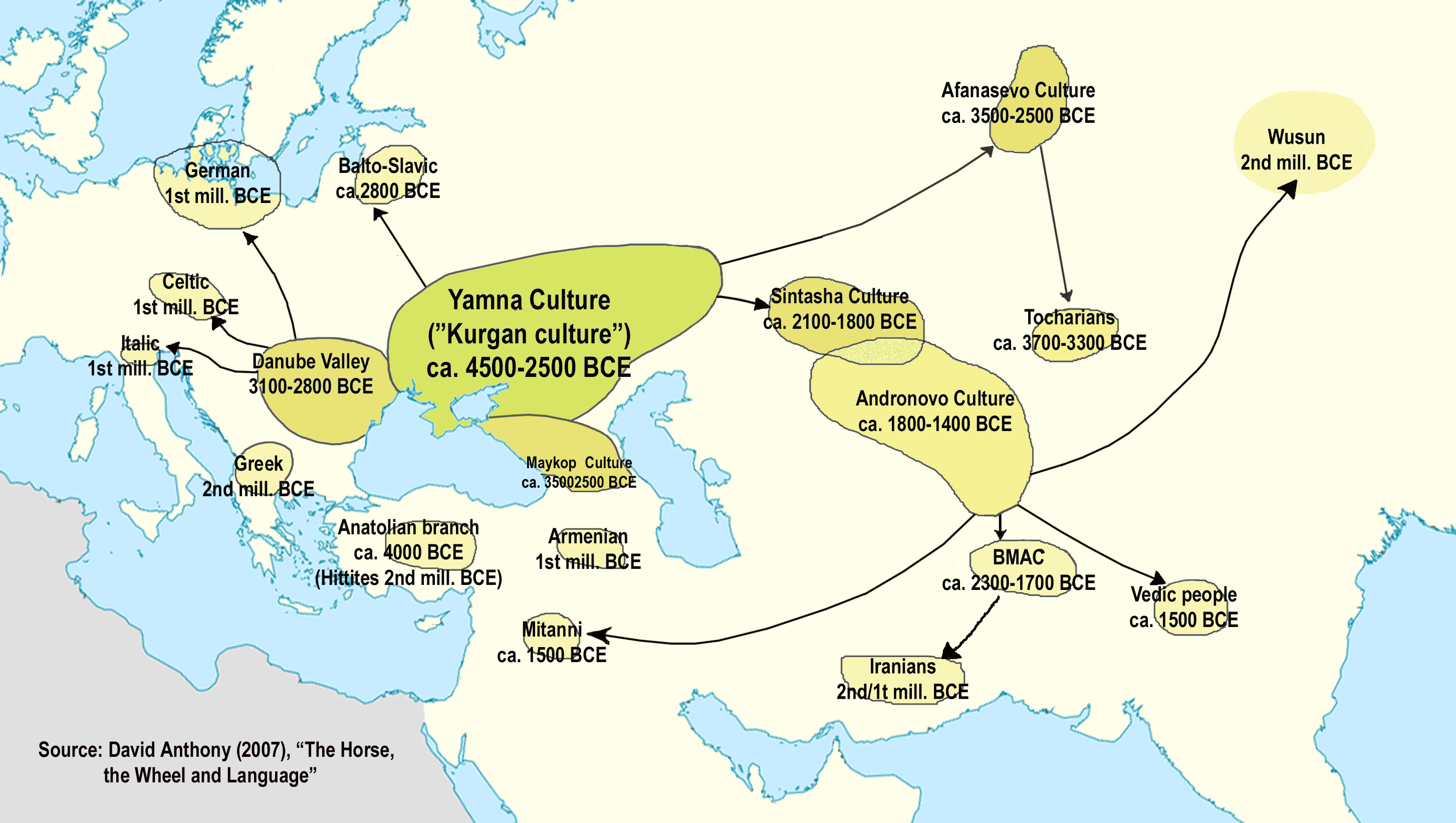
Indo-European migrations as described in The Horse, the Wheel, and Language by David W. Anthony

Although all Indo-European languages descend from a common ancestor called Proto-Indo-European, the kinship between the subfamilies or branches (large groups of more closely related languages within the language family), that descend from other more recent proto-languages, is not the same because there are subfamilies that are closer or further, and they did not split-off at the same time, the affinity or kinship of Indo-European subfamilies or branches between themselves is still an unresolved and controversial issue and being investigated. However, there is some consensus that Anatolian was the first group of Indo-European (branch) to split-off from all the others and Tocharian was the second in which that happened. Using a mathematical analysis borrowed from evolutionary biology, Donald Ringe and Tandy Warnow propose the following tree of Indo-European branches:

- Proto-Indo-European (PIE)
  - Pre-Anatolian (before 3500 BC)
  - Pre-Tocharian
  - Pre-Italic and Pre-Celtic (before 2500 BC)
  - Pre-Armenian and Pre-Greek (after 2500 BC)
  - Proto-Indo-Iranian (2000 BC)
  - Pre-Germanic and Pre-Balto-Slavic; proto-Germanic (500 BC)

David W. Anthony, following the methodology of Donald Ringe and Tandy Warnow, proposes the following sequence:

- Proto-Indo-European (PIE)
  - Pre-Anatolian (4200 BC)
  - Pre-Tocharian (3700 BC)
  - Pre-Germanic (3300 BC)
  - Pre-Italic and Pre-Celtic (3000 BC)
  - Pre-Armenian (2800 BC)
  - Pre-Balto-Slavic (2800 BC)
  - Pre-Greek (2500 BC)
  - Proto-Indo-Iranic (2200 BC); split between Old Iranic and Old Indic 1800 BC

The list below follows Donald Ringe, Tandy Warnow and Ann Taylor classification tree for Indo-European branches. quoted in Anthony, David W. (2007), The Horse, the Wheel and Language: How Bronze-Age Riders from the Eurasian Steppes Shaped the Modern World, Princeton University Press. The Indo-European phylogenetic tree of subfamilies or branches is also based in Chang, Chundra & Hall 2015, pp. 199–200 and Hyllested & Joseph 2022, p. 241.

== Anatolian languages (all extinct) ==
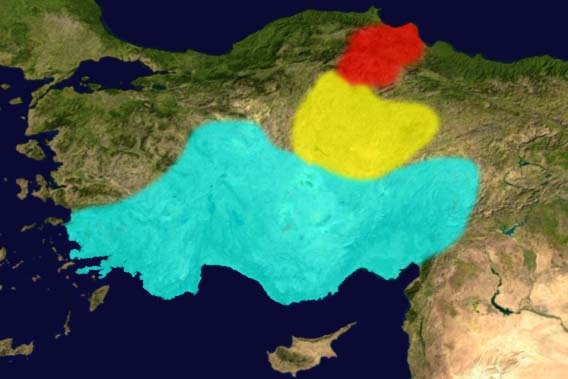
Anatolian languages in 2nd millennium BC; Blue: Luwian, Yellow: Hittite, Red: Palaic.

- Proto-Anatolian
  - Proto-Luwo-Lydian
    - Proto-Luwo-Palaic
      - Proto-Luwic
        - Proto-Luwian
          - Luwian
            - Cuneiform Luwian
            - Hieroglyphic Luwian
        - Proto-Lyco-Carian
          - Proto-Carian–Milyan
            - Carian
            - Milyan ("Lycian B")
          - Proto-Lycian–Sidetic
            - Lycian
            - Sidetic
        - Pisidian
      - Proto-Palaic
        - Palaic
    - Proto-Lydian
      - Lydian
  - Proto-Hittite
    - Hittite / Nesite
      - Kanišite Hittite
      - Ḫattuša Hittite

Unclassified (within Anatolian)

- Kalasmian / Kalašma / Kalasmaic

Possibly Anatolian

- Hitite or Luwian
  - Cappadocian?
- Luwic-Palaic
  - Luwic
    - Isaurian?
    - Lycaonian?
    - Cilician?
    - Commagenian?
  - Palaic
    - Paphlagonian?

== Tocharian languages (Agnean-Kuchean) (all extinct) ==
Tocharian languages: A (blue), B (red) and C (green) in the Tarim Basin. Tarim oasis towns are given as listed in the Book of Han (c. 2nd century BC). The areas of the squares are proportional to population.

- Proto-Agnean-Kuchean ("Proto-Tocharian")
  - North-Tocharian
    - Tocharian A (Agnean) (Turfanian / East Tocharian) (Agni / Ārśi)
    - Tocharian B (Kuchean) (West Tocharian) (Kuśiññe / Kučiññe)
  - South Tocharian
    - Tocharian C (Kroränian) (possible) (Krorainic / Lolanisch / South Tocharian)

== Armenian language ==
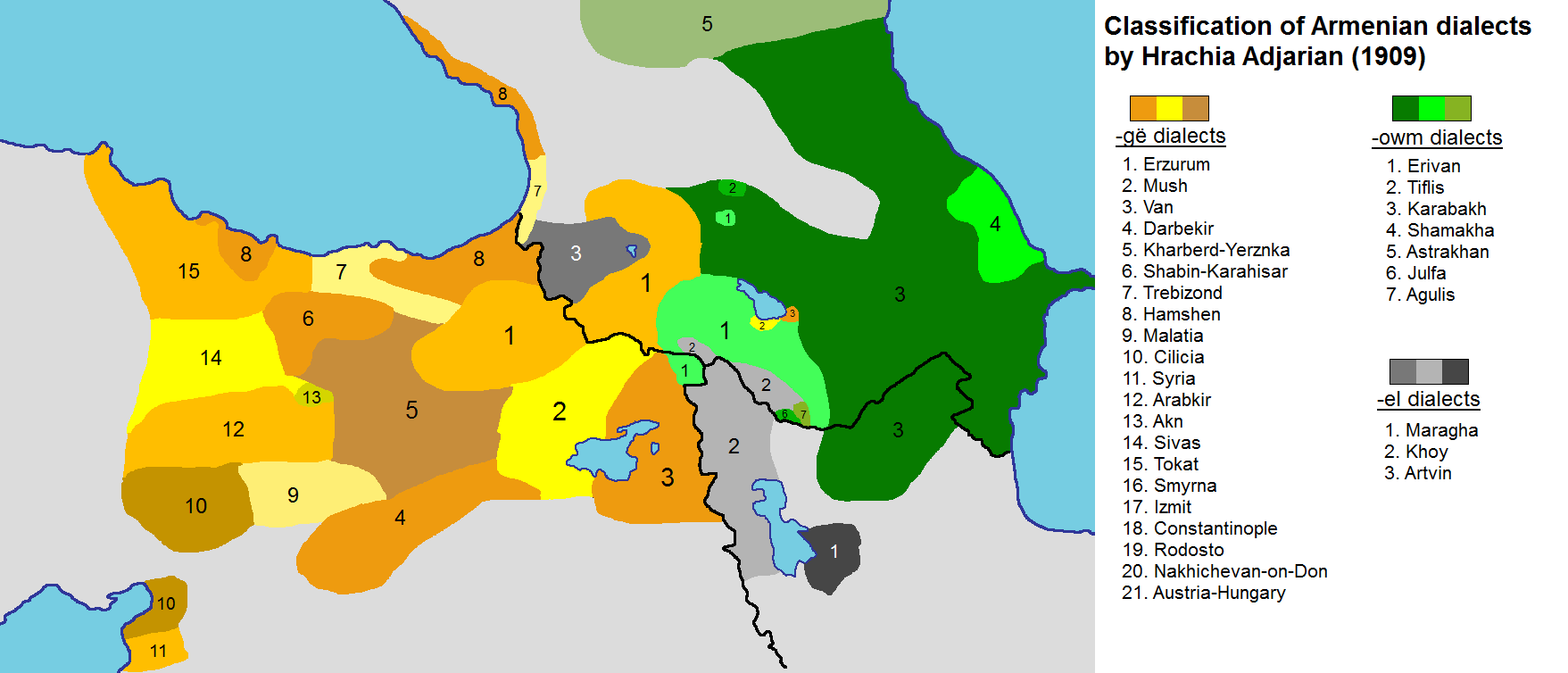
Armenian dialects, according to Adjarian (1909) (before 1st World War and Armenian Genocide). In many regions of the contiguous area shown in the map, Armenian speakers were the majority or a significant minority.

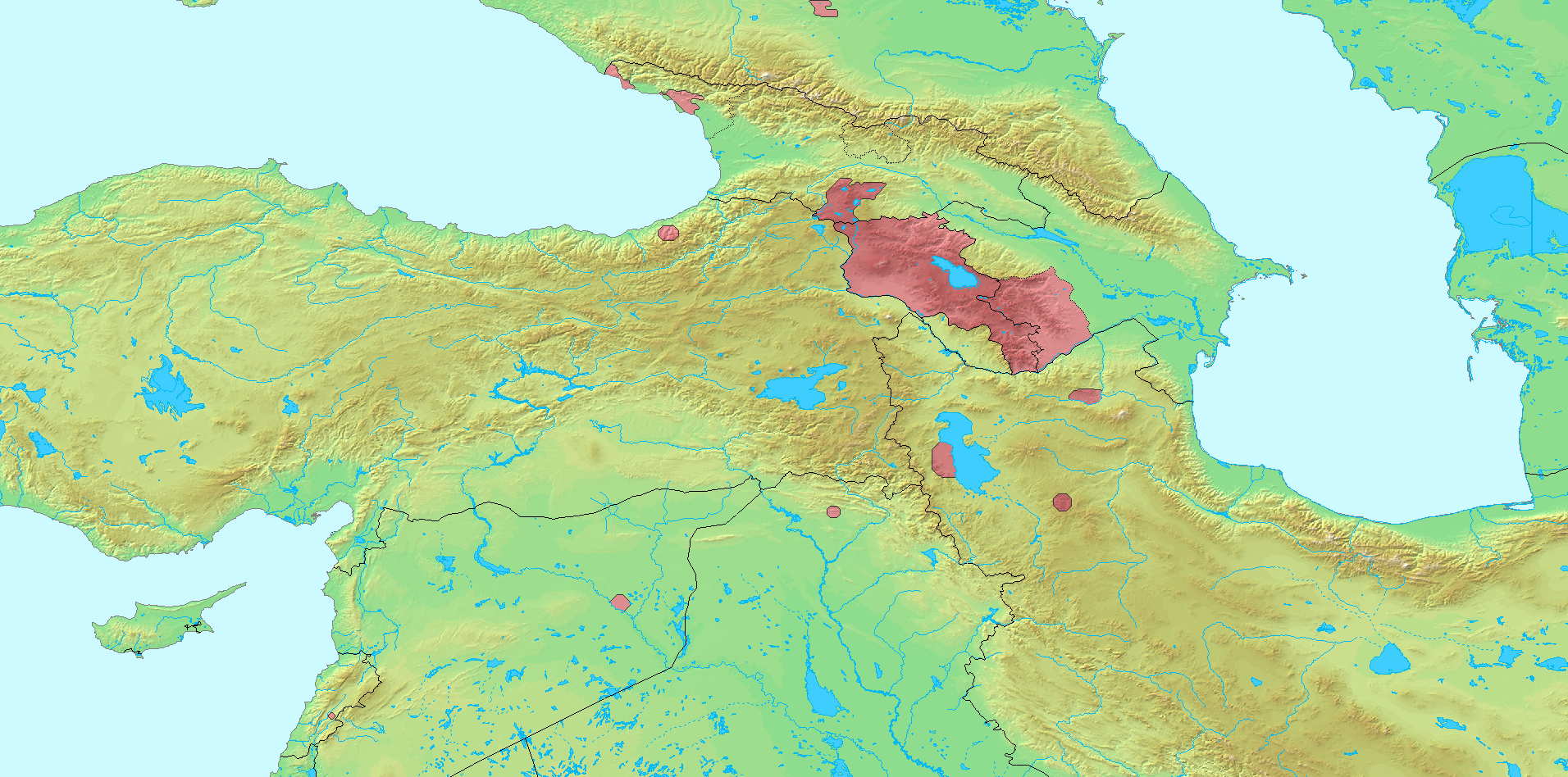
Modern geographical distribution of the Armenian language.

- Proto-Armenian (extinct)
  - Classical Armenian / Old Armenian
    - Liturgical Armenian
    - Middle Armenian / Cilician Armenian
      - Modern Armenian
        - Armenian (Broad Armenian dialect continuum)
          - Armenian Standards
            - Eastern Armenian
            - Western Armenian
          - Armenian dialects
            - Eastern Armenian (dialect continuum)
              - -owm dialects
                - Araratian
                  - Yerevan
                    - Modern Eastern Armenian Standard
                - Jugha / Julfa
                - Zok (could be a distinct armenian language)
                  - Agulis
                  - Meghri
                - Artsakh / Karabagh Armenian
                - Eastern Armenian dialects in the diaspora
                  - Tiflis / Tbilisi Armenian
                  - Shamakha (nearly extinct)
                  - Astrakhan Armenian (extinct)
                  - Iranian Armenian / Persian Armenian
                    - Northwest Iran Armenian
                      - Tabriz Armenian (Tavrezh)
                    - North Iran Armenian
                      - Tehran Armenian
                    - Central Iran Armenian
                      - New Jugha / New Julfa / Isfahan Armenian
              - -el dialects
                - Ardvin / Tayk
                - Nor Shirakan
                  - Khoy
                  - Maragha
            - Western Armenian (dialect continuum)
              - -gë dialects
                - Karin / Erzurum
                - Turuberan
                  - Mush / Taron
                    - Gavar
                - Van / Vaspurakan
                  - Torfavan
                - Tigranakert / Aghdznik (Arzanene) (nearly extinct)
                - Kharpert–Yerznka (nearly extinct)
                - Shabin–Karahisar
                - Trapizon / Trabzon Armenian (nearly extinct)
                - Malatia (extinct)
                  - Adiyaman
                - Cilician Armenian (nearly extinct)
                - Sueidia / Syrian Armenian
                  - Vakıflı
                  - Kessab
                  - Latakia
                  - Jisr al-Shughur
                  - Anjar
                - Arabkir (nearly extinct)
                - Akn (nearly extinct)
                - Sebastia / Sivas Armenian (nearly extinct)
                - Tokat (nearly extinct)
                - Western Armenian dialects in the diaspora
                  - West Anatolia diaspora
                    - Nicomedia / Izmit Armenian
                    - Constantinople / Istanbul Armenian (nearly extinct)
                    - Rodosto / Tekirdağ Armenian (extinct)
                    - Smyrna / Izmir Armenian
                  - Black Sea diaspora
                    - Crimean Armenian
                      - Nor Nakhichevan / Nakhichevan-on-Don / New Nakhichevan / Don Armenian
                  - Levant diaspora
                    - Kaghakatsi / Jerusalem Armenian (Armenian Quarter)
                  - European diaspora
                    - Austria-Hungary (extinct)
                  - North American diaspora
                  - South American diaspora
                  - Australian diaspora
                - Homshetsi (could be a distinct archaic armenian language)

== Hellenic languages ==
Distribution of Greek dialects in Greece in the classical period.
Western group:
- Doric proper
- Northwest Doric
- Achaean Doric (probably Northwest Doric)
Central group:
- Aeolic
- Arcado-Cypriot
Eastern group:
- Attic
- Ionic

Distribution of Greek dialects in Magna Graecia (Southern Italy and Sicily) in the classical period.
Western group:
- Doric proper
- Northwest Doric
- Achaean Doric (probably Northwest Doric)
Eastern group:
- Attic-Ionic

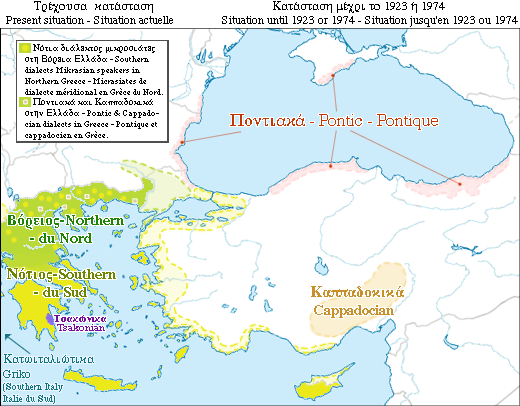
Modern Greek dialects until 1923

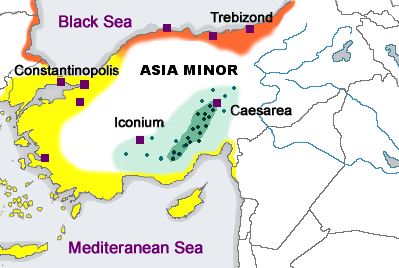
Anatolian Greek until 1923. Demotic in yellow. Pontic in orange. Cappadocian in green. Green dots indicate Cappadocian-Greek-speaking villages in 1910.

The distribution of major modern Greek dialect areas.

- Proto-Greek (extinct)
  - Mycenaean Greek (extinct)
    - Ancient Greek / Classical Greek (dialect continuum, extinct)
      - Ancient Greek dialects
        - East Greek
          - Central Group (extinct)
            - Aeolic Greek (extinct)
              - Thessalian
              - Boeotian
              - Lesbian
              - Asia Minor Aeolian
            - Arcadocypriot (extinct)
              - Arcadian
              - Cypriot
              - Pamphylian
          - Eastern Group
            - Ionic (extinct)
              - Ionic Literary Dialect
                - Homeric Greek / Epic Greek
              - Attic (extinct)
                - Koine Greek
                  - Biblical Greek
                    - Septuagint Greek
                      - Jewish Koine Greek
                    - New Testament Greek
                  - Medieval Greek / Byzantine Greek / Middle Greek (dialect continuum)
                    - Modern Greek
                      - Greek (Broad Greek dialect continuum)
                        - Greek Standards
                          - Katharevousa / Old Standard Greek
                          - Demotic / Modern Standard Greek
                        - Modern Greek dialects
                          - Southern dialects
                            - Archaic dialects
                              - Old Athenian
                              - Aeginian
                              - Kymian
                              - Megaran
                              - Maniot
                                - Paomia-Cargèse Greek (Corsican Greek) (extinct)
                            - Ionian-Peloponnesian
                              - Peloponnesian
                              - Ionian Islands
                              - South Euboean
                            - Cretan-Cycladian
                              - Cretan
                              - Cycladian
                            - Southeastern
                              - Chiote-Ikarian
                              - Dodecanesian
                              - Lycian Greek
                              - Cypriot
                            - North Epirote
                              - Himariote
                          - Northern dialects
                            - Central dialects ("Semi-Northern")
                              - North Euboean-Sporadic
                              - Skyriot
                              - Mykonian
                              - Desfinan
                              - Lefkadan
                            - Northern Proper
                              - Thessalian
                              - South Epirote
                              - Vourbianian
                              - Kastorian
                              - Naousan
                              - Macedonian Greek
                              - Sarakatsanian (Sarakatsanika)
                              - Thracian Greek
                              - Rumelian Greek
                              - Constantinopolitan Greek / Istanbul Greek
                              - Bithynian Greek
                              - Artakian
                              - Western Anatolian
                                - North Aegean
                                  - Lesbic (Lesbos Island Greek)
                                  - Lemnic (Lemnos Island Greek)
                                - Smyrniote (Smyrna Greek)
                                - Samian (Samos Island Greek)
                          - Greco-Australian
                    - Asia Minor Greek / Anatolian Greek
                      - Silliot
                      - Proto-Cappadocian
                        - Pharasiot
                        - Pontic-Cappadocian
                          - Pontic Greek (ποντιακά – Pontiaká)
                            - Western Pontic
                            - Trepezuntine
                            - Chaldiot
                            - Mariupolitan Greek (Rumeíka)
                          - Cappadocian Greek (Καππαδοκικά - Kappadokiká)
                    - Italiot Greek
                      - Salentinian Greek / Griko (Γκρίκο – Gríko)
                      - Calabrian Greek / Grecanico (Γκραίκο – Graíko)
                    - Yevanic (Judæo-Greek / Romaniote) (probably extinct)
              - West Ionic / Euboean
                - Chalcidician
              - Central Ionic / Cycladian Ionic / Northern Cycladian
              - East Ionic / Asia Minor Ionic
        - West Greek / Doric / Dorian (extinct)
          - Northwest Greek / Northwest Doric (extinct)
            - Locrian Greek (extinct)
            - Phocian-Delphian
            - Elean
            - Northwest Greek koine
          - Achaean Doric (extinct)
            - Achaean Doric
            - Achaean Doric Koine
          - Doric proper
            - Megarian
            - Corinthian
            - Argolic
            - Laconian
              - Tsakonian (Tσακώνικα – Tsakṓnika / A Tσακώνικα γρούσσα – A Tsakṓnika gloússa)
                - Peloponnesian
                  - Northern
                  - Southern
                  - Western? (extinct)
                - Propontis (extinct)
            - Messenian
            - Cretan
            - Cycladian Doric / Southern Cycladian
              - Thera-Cyrenaean
                - Thera (Santorini) Island
                - Cyrenaean Greek
            - Asia Minor Doric
              - Rhodian / Rhodes Island
              - Coan / Cos Island
  - Ancient Macedonian (extinct)

== Albanian language ==
Distribution of modern Albanian dialects.

- Proto-Albanian (extinct)
  - Albanian (Modern Albanian) (shqip / gjuha shqipe) (dialect continuum)
    - Albanian dialects
      - Gheg Albanian (gegnisht) (Northern Albanian dialect)
        - Northern Gheg
          - Northwestern Gheg
            - Malësia
            - Kraja
            - Shkodër and Lezhë
          - Northeastern Gheg
            - East Drin basin
            - Nikaj and Mertur
            - Tropoja
            - Kosovë and Metohi / Kosovo Albanian
        - Central / Middle Gheg
          - Mati
          - Upper Reka
        - Southern Gheg
          - Elbasan Gheg
          - Old Tirana
          - Peqin Province
          - Southern Gheg diaspora
            - Arbanasi
            - Istrian Albanian (extinct)
            - Syrmia / Srem Albanian (extinct)
      - Tosk Albanian (toskërisht) (Southern Albanian dialect) (basis of Standard Albanian)
        - Northern Tosk
          - Northwest Tosk
            - Berat
            - Skrapar
            - Vlora
          - Northeast Tosk
            - Opar
            - Devoll
            - Korçë
          - Southeast
          - Middle Vjosa
          - Northern Tosk diaspora
            - Western Thracian Tosk (Western Thrace Albanians dialect)
        - Southern Tosk
          - Lab (Labërishtja)
            - East Drinos Valley
            - Bregdeti i Poshtëm
            - Vurg of Delvina
          - Cham (Çamërishte)
            - Souliot Cham (extinct)
        - Transitional Northern-Southern Tosk / Tosk diaspora
          - Mandritsa (Mandricë) Albanian / Bulgarian Albanian
          - Ukraine Albanian (Albanians in Ukraine dialect)
          - Arbërishte (Southern Italy Tosk Albanian)
            - Apulia Arbërishte
            - Molise Arbërishte / Campo Marino Albanian
            - Campania Arbërishte
            - Basilicata Arbërishte
            - Calabria Arbërishte / Calabro-Arbërishte
            - Sicilia Arbërishte
          - Arvanitika (Greece Tosk Albanian)
            - Viotia Arvanitika / Boeotia Arvanitika
            - Evia Arvanitika / Euboea Arvanitika
            - Attiki Arvanitika / Attica Arvanitika
            - Salamina Arvanitika
            - Peloponnese Arvanitika

== Italic languages ==
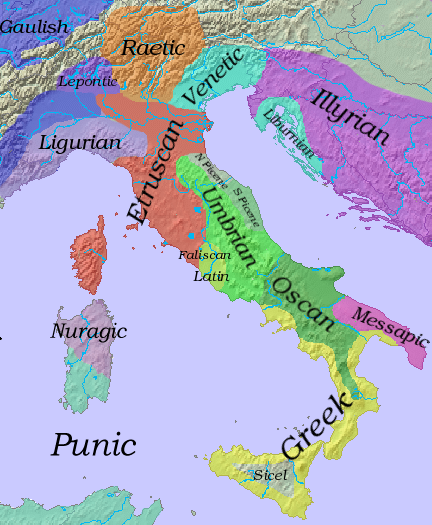
Iron Age Italy (c.500 BC). Italic languages in green colours.

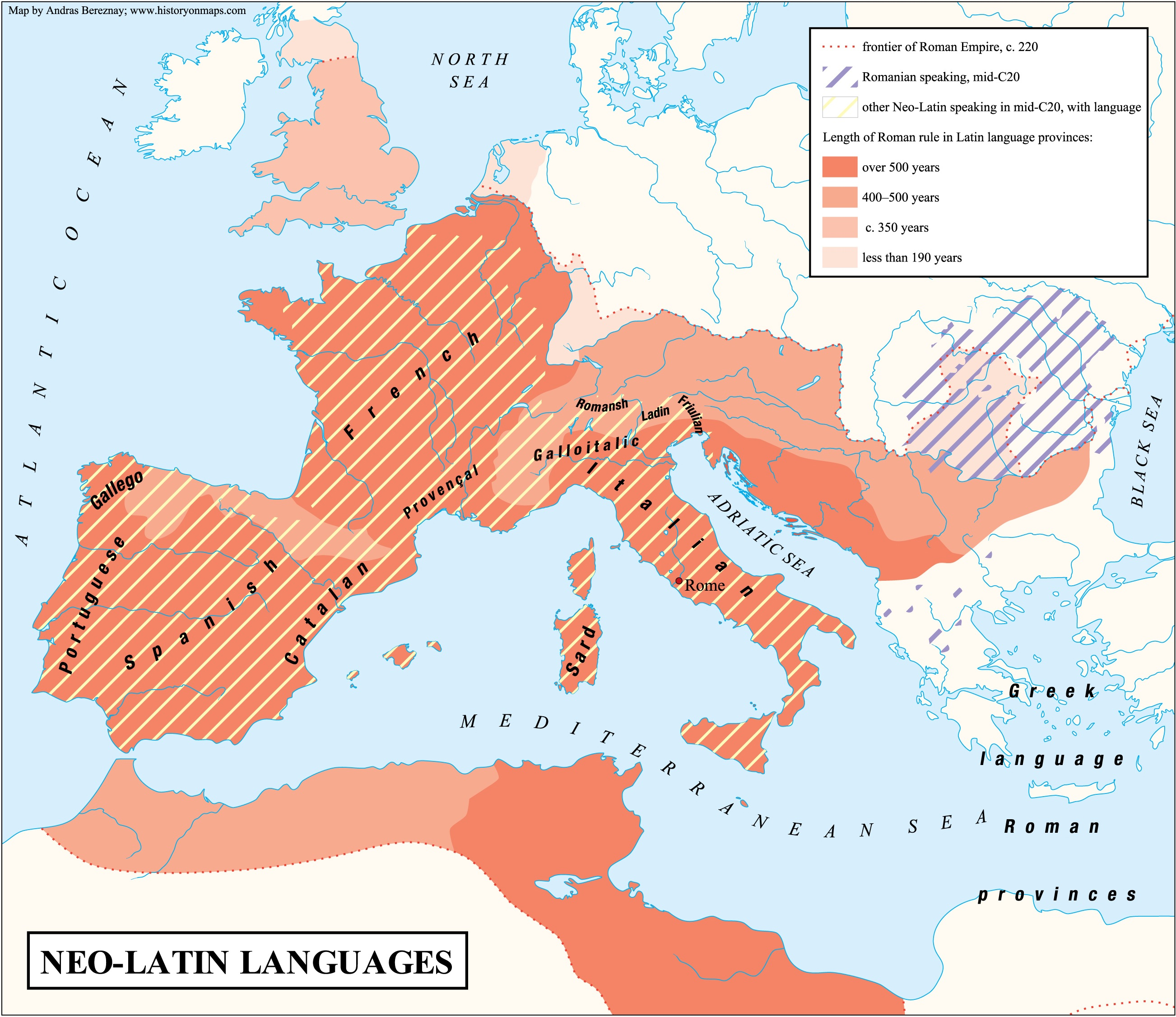
Length of the Roman rule and the Romance Languages

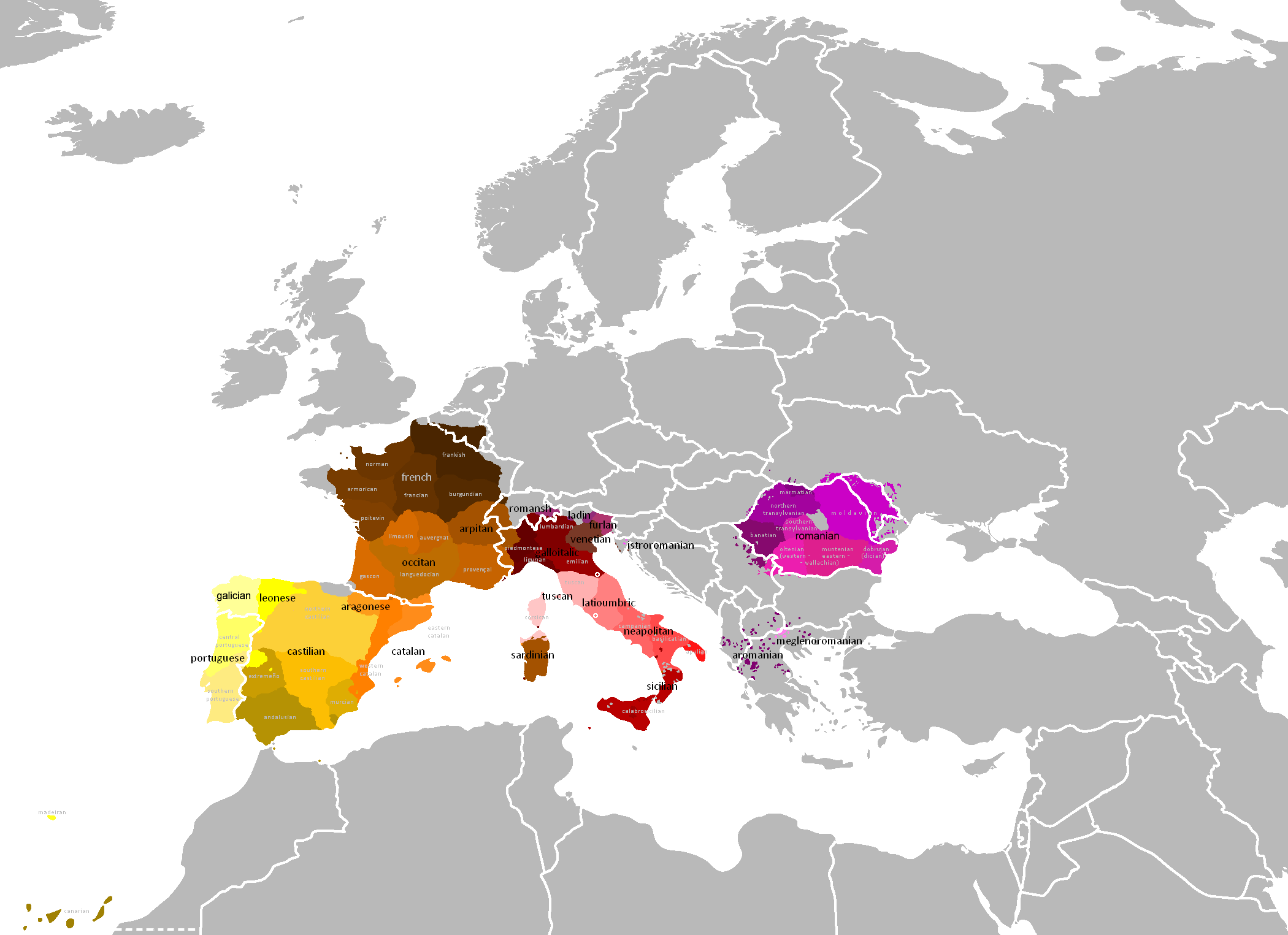
Romance languages in Europe (major dialect groups are also shown).

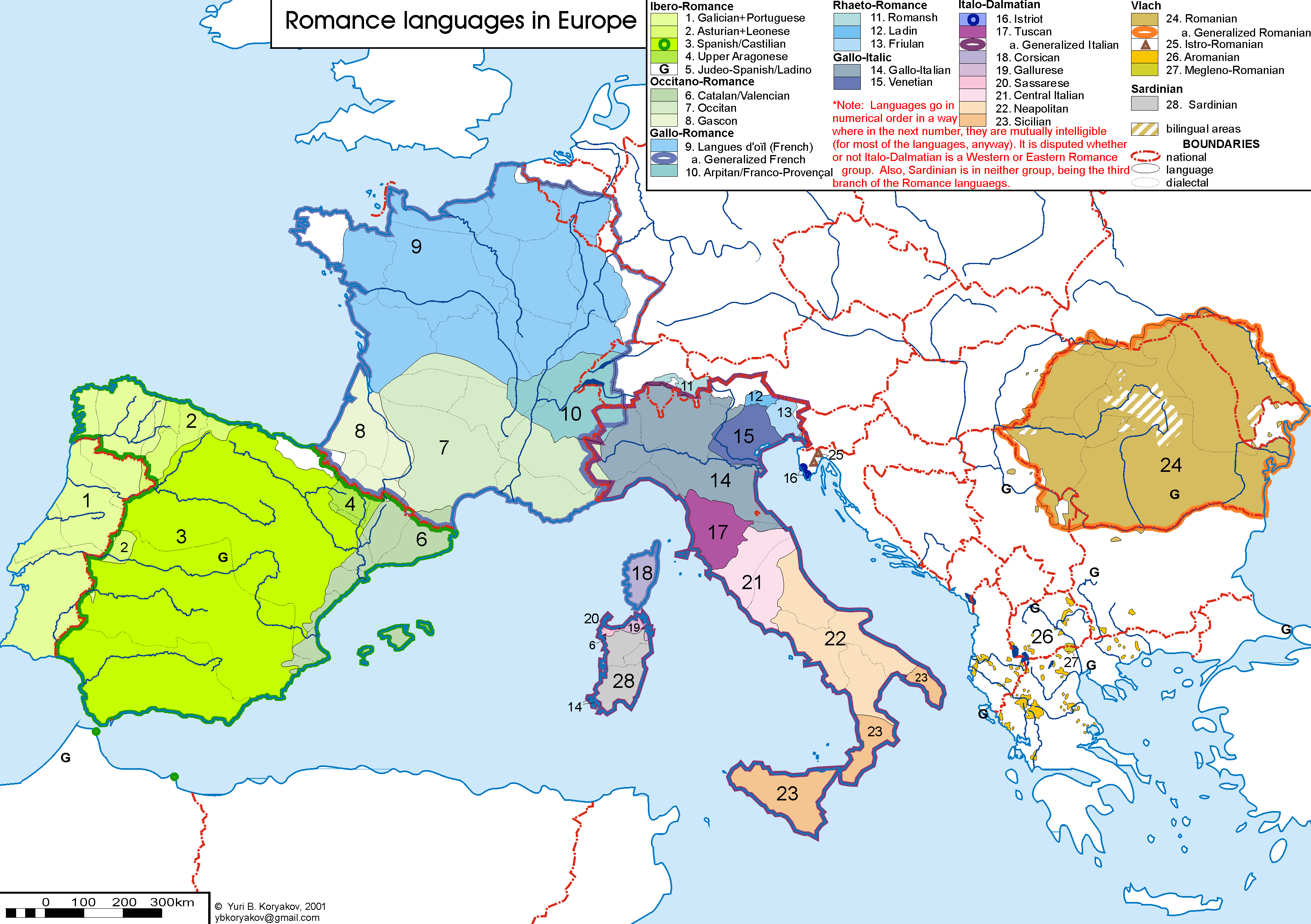
European extent of Romance languages in the 20th century

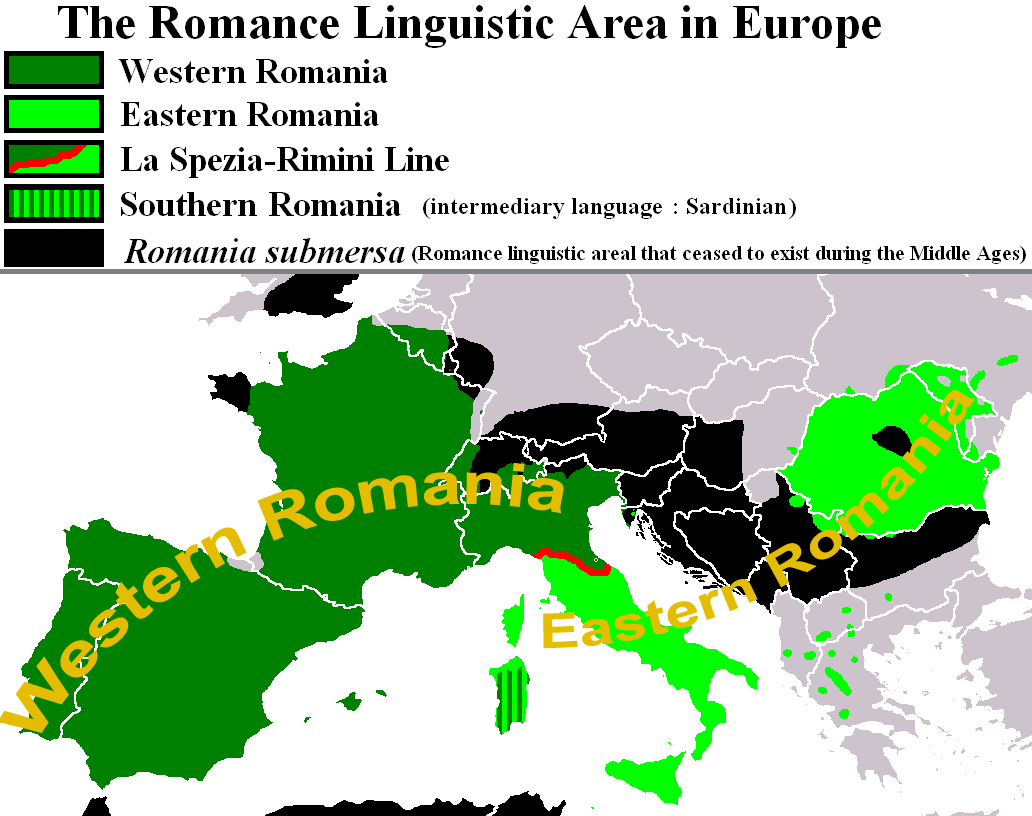
Eastern and Western Romance areas split by the La Spezia–Rimini Line; Southern Romance is represented by Sardinian as an outlier.

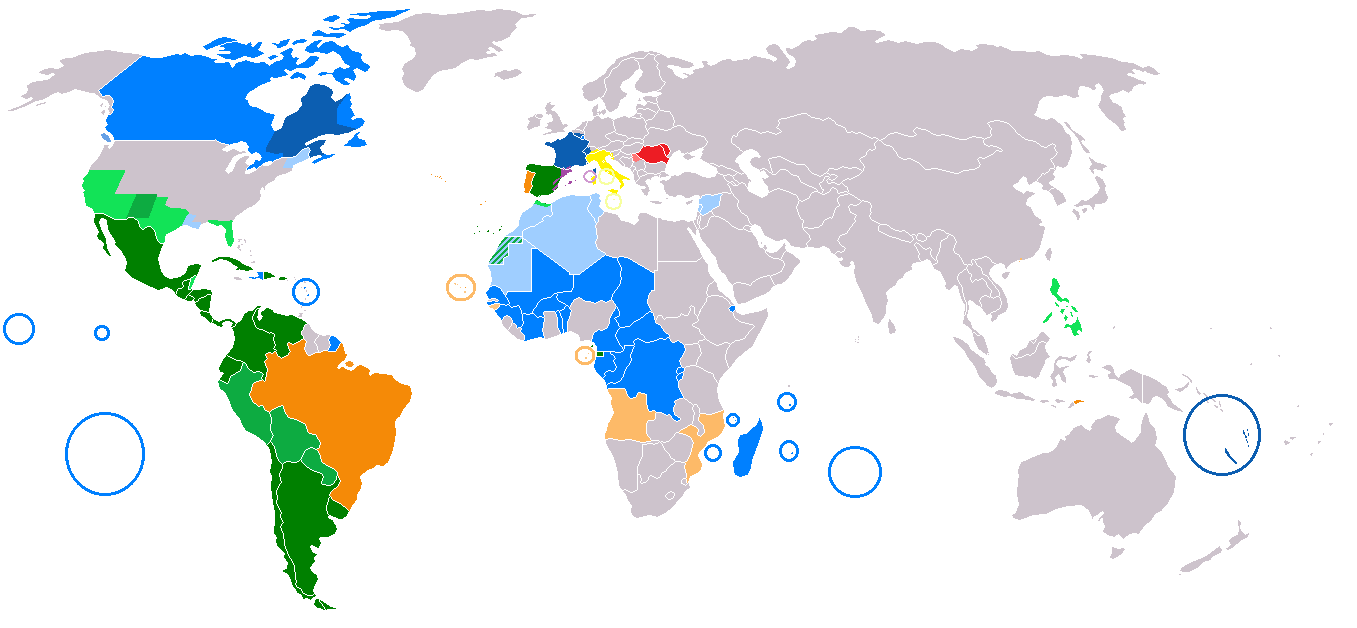
Romance languages in the World. Countries and sub-national entities where one or more Romance languages are spoken. Dark colours: First language, Light colours: Official or Co-Official language; Very Light colours: Spoken by a significant minority as first or second language. Blue: French; Green: Spanish; Orange: Portuguese; Yellow: Italian; Red: Romanian.

- Proto-Italic (extinct)
  - Osco-Umbrian (Sabellic) (all extinct)
    - Umbrian
      - Umbrian proper
      - Sabine
      - Marsian
      - Volscian
      - Sabine
    - Oscan
      - Oscan proper
        - Samnite
        - Lucanian
      - Marrucinian
      - Paelignian
      - Sidicini
      - Hernican
    - Unclassified (within Italic) (extinct)
      - Aequian
      - Vestinian
      - South Picene (Old Sabellic)
      - Pre-Samnite
      - Oenotrian
  - Latino-Faliscan languages
    - Faliscan (extinct)
    - Lanuvian (extinct)
    - Praenestinian (extinct)
    - Latin (Lingua Latina)
      - Old Latin (Early Latin / Archaic Latin) (Prisca Latina / Prisca Latinitas) (extinct)
        - Classical Latin (LINGVA LATINA – Lingua Latina) (extinct)
          - Standard Latin (extinct)
          - Vulgar Latin / Colloquial Latin (sermō vulgāris) (extinct)
          - Pannonian Latin (extinct)
          - British Latin / Britannic Latin (extinct)
          - Judeo-Latin (Judæo-Latin) (extinct)
          - Late Latin (extinct)
            - Ecclesiastical Latin (Church Latin, Liturgical Latin) (Lingua Latina Ecclesiastica)
            - Medieval Latin (extinct)
              - Hiberno-Latin / Hisperic Latin (extinct)
              - Renaissance Latin
                - Neo-Latin or New Latin; (Neolatina or Lingua Latina Nova)
                  - Contemporary Latin (Latinitas viva)
            - Late Vulgar Latin (sermo vulgaris) (Proto-Romance) (extinct)
              - Romance (dialect continuum)
                - Continental Romance
                  - Italo-Western languages (dialect continuum)
                    - Disputed Italo-Western
                      - Franco-Italian (extinct)
                    - Italo-Dalmatian languages (dialect continuum)
                      - Central Italian (Italiano mediano)
                        - Latian (Laziale)
                          - Romanesco (Romanesco / Romano)
                          - Central-Southern
                          - Central-Northern Latian / Ciociaro
                            - Judeo-Roman dialect (Giudeo-Romanesco)
                        - Sabino
                          - Carseolano / Sublacense
                          - Tagliacozzano
                          - Aquilano
                        - Umbrian (Umbro)
                          - Southeastern
                          - Northern
                          - Northwestern and Viterbese
                        - Central Marchigiano (Marchigiano Proper)
                          - Maceratese
                          - Anconitan
                      - Southern Italian
                        - Neapolitan (Napulitano – O Nnapulitano)
                          - Campanian (Campano)
                            - Naples Neapolitan (Napoletano) (Naples city dialect)
                            - Beneventano
                            - Southern Latian
                            - Irpino
                              - Arianese
                            - Cilentano (Cilentan / Northern Cilentan)
                          - Molisan
                          - Marchigiano Meridionale - Abruzzese
                            - Abruzzese
                              - Vastese (Lu Uâʃtaréule)
                            - Teramano
                            - Marchigiano Meridionale
                          - Apulian (Pugliese)
                            - Barese
                            - Tarantino (Tarandíne)
                          - Lucanian
                            - Castelmezzano (part of Lausberg area)
                            - Northern Calabrian
                        - Extreme Southern Italian / Far Southern Italian (Siculo-Calabrian)
                          - Southern Calabrian
                          - Sicilian / Sicilian Proper (Sicilianu / Lu Sicilianu)
                            - Pantesco
                          - Cilentano Meridionale (Far Southern Cilentan)
                          - Salentino (Salentinu)
                            - Manduriano
                      - Old Tuscan
                        - Tuscan (Toscano)
                          - Eastern
                            - Florentine (Fiorentino)
                              - Italian (Italiano / Lingua italiana) / Standard Italian
                                - Regional Italian
                                  - Tuscany Regional Italian
                                  - Central Italy, Southern Italy and Sicily Regional Italian
                                  - Northern Italy Regional Italian
                                  - Sardinia Regional Italian
                                - Maltese Italian
                                - Swiss Italian
                                - Italo-Australian
                              - Judeo-Florentine
                            - Pratese
                            - Pistoiese
                            - Senese
                            - Aretino
                            - Casentino
                            - Chianino
                          - Western
                            - Lucchese
                            - Pisano
                            - Livornese
                              - Judeo-Livornese (Bagitto) (extinct)
                            - Grossetano
                            - Elbano (Elba Island)
                        - Corsican (Corsu / Lingua Corsa)
                          - Northern Corsican
                          - Central Corsican
                          - Southern Corsican
                          - Capraiese (extinct)
                          - Castellanese
                          - Gallurese (Gadduresu)
                          - Sassarese (Sassaresu / Turritanu)
                      - Venetian (Romance Venetian) (Vèneto / Łéngoa vèneta)
                        - Lagoon Venetian
                        - Central Venetian
                          - Paduan (extinct)
                        - Western Venetian
                        - Trentine Venetian
                        - Alpine Venetian
                        - Eastern Venetian
                          - Trevigiano
                            - Chipilo Venetian (Cipilegno) (Puebla Venetian)
                          - Feltrino
                          - Colonial Venetian (Eastern Adriatic Venetian)
                            - Bisiaco-Gradese-Maranese Venetian (Coastal Friuli)
                            - Triestine
                            - Fiuman
                            - Istro-Dalmatian Venetian
                              - Istrian Venetian
                              - Dalmatian Venetian
                            - Corfiot Venetian
                        - Venetian diaspora
                          - Pontine Marshes Venetian (in Southeastern Lazio)
                          - Talian (Brazilian Venetian)
                        - Judeo-Venetian Italkian (Giudeo-Veneziano) (extinct)
                      - Judeo-Italian / Italkian (ג'יודו-איטאליאנו – Giudeo-Italiano / איטלקית – Italqit) (La'az - לעז)
                      - Illyro-Roman / Dalmatian (Transitional Western-Eastern Romance)
                        - Istriot
                        - Dalmatian (Romance Dalmatian) (dalmato, langa dalmata) (extinct)
                          - Vegliote
                          - Ragusan
                    - Western Romance languages (dialect continuum)
                      - Gallo-Romance languages (dialect continuum)
                        - Gallo-Italic (Cisalpine Romance)
                          - Emilian-Romagnol (Emiliân-Rumagnôl) (dialect continuum)
                            - Gallo-Picene (disputed) (third component of Emilian–Romagnol continuum ?)
                              - Marecchiese
                              - Pesarese
                              - Urbinate-Fanese-Senigalliese
                                - Urbinate
                                - Fanese
                                - Senigalliese
                            - Romagnol (Rumagnôl)
                              - Ravennate
                              - Forlivese
                              - Faentino
                              - Cesenate
                              - Riminese
                              - Sammarinese (San Marino Romagnol)
                            - Emilian (Emigliân)
                              - Bolognese (Bulgnaix)
                              - Modenese (Mudnaix)
                              - Ferrarese (Fraraix)
                              - Reggiano (Arzan)
                              - Mantuan (Mantovano/Mantvan)
                                - Judeo-Mantuan (extinct)
                              - Parmesan (Parmigiano) (Pramzan)
                              - Piacentino (Piaxintein)
                              - Vogherese (Vugaraix)
                              - Lunigiana Emilian (Lunizan)
                              - Carrara Emilian (Cararein)
                              - Massa Emilian (Masaix)
                              - Garfagnana Emilian (Garfagnein)
                          - Lombard (Romance Lombard) (Lombard / Lumbaart)
                            - Eastern Lombard (Lombard)
                              - Bressano / Bresciano
                              - Bergamasco (Bergamàsch)
                              - Cremish (Cremàsch)
                            - Western Lombard (Lombard / Lumbaart)
                              - Milanese (Milanés) / Meneghin (Macromilanese)
                              - Pre-Alpine Western Lombard (Lombardo-Prealpino Occidentale)
                                - Brianzöö / Brianzolo
                                  - Canzés (in Canzo)
                                - Bustocco-Legnanese
                                - Comasco-Lecchese
                                  - Comasco
                                  - Laghée
                                  - Vallassinese
                                  - Lecchese
                                - Varesino / Bosin
                              - Alpine Western Lombard (Lombardo Alpino)
                                - Ticinese
                                  - Ossolano
                                - Valtellinese-Chiavennasco
                              - Southwestern Lombard (Basso-Lombardo Occidentale)
                                - Pavese
                                - Lodigiano
                                - Novarese (Nuares)
                                - Cremunés
                              - Spasell (extinct)
                          - Piedmontese (Piemontèis)
                            - Eastern Piemontese
                              - South-Eastern
                              - North-Eastern
                            - Western Piemontese
                            - Canavese
                            - Judaeo-Piedmontese (Giudeo-Piemontese) (extinct)
                          - Ligurian / Genoese (Romance Ligurian) (Ligure / Lengua Ligure / Zenéize)
                            - Genoese Ligurian (Central Ligurian) (Zenéize)
                            - Eastern Ligurian / Spezzino (Lìgure do levànte)
                            - Central-Western Ligurian (Lìgure centro-òcidentâle e òcidentâle / Lìgure de çéntro-ponénte)
                              - Western Ligurian / Intemelio
                                - Monégasque (Munegascu)
                            - Alpine Ligurian (Lìgure alpìn)
                              - Brigasc
                              - Royasc (Roiasc)
                            - Oltregiogo Ligurian (Lìgure de l'Oltrezôvo) / Northern Ligurian
                            - Colonial Ligurian (Lìgure coloniâle)
                              - Figun Ligurian / Figoun / Figon / Provence (extinct)
                              - Capraia Ligurian (Cravaiéize) (extinct)
                              - Corsican Ligurian
                                - Calvesino (Calvéize)
                                - Ajaccino (Ajasìn)
                                - Bonifacino (Bonifassin)
                              - Sardinian Ligurian
                                - Tabarchino (Tabarchin)
                                - New Tabarchino (Lìgure de Nêuva Tabàrca) (extinct)
                              - Gibraltar Ligurian (Lìgure de Gibiltæra) (extinct)
                              - Chios Ligurian (Chiòtico) (extinct)
                          - Gallo-Italic of Basilicata
                          - Gallo-Italic of Sicily
                        - Gallo-Rhaetian
                          - Rhaeto-Romance
                            - Friulian / Friulan (Furlan / Lenghe Furlane / Marilenghe)
                              - Standard Friulian (Furlan normalizât)
                              - North Friulian
                              - Central Friulian
                              - Southeast Friulian
                              - West Friulian
                                - Ertano
                              - Muglisano (extinct)
                              - Tergestino (extinct)
                            - Ladin (Ladin / Lingaz Ladin)
                              - Ladin Dolomitan (Standard Ladin)
                              - Fornes (?)
                              - Sella
                                - Athesian
                                - Trentinian
                                - Agordino
                              - Ampezzan
                              - Cadorino
                              - Nones
                            - Romansh (Rumantsch / Rumàntsch / Romauntsch / Romontsch)
                              - Rumantsch Grischun (Standard Romansh)
                              - Sursilvan
                              - Surmiran
                              - Putèr
                              - Vallader
                              - Jauer
                              - Tuatschin
                          - Oïl (Northern Gallo-Romance) (Langues d'Oïl) (dialect continuum)
                            - Southeastern Oïl
                              - Arpitan (Arpetan / Francoprovençâl / Patouès)
                                - Valsoanin
                                - Valdôtain
                                - Savoyard
                                - Genevois
                                - Vaudois
                                - Fribourgeois
                                - Neuchâtelois
                                - Valaisan
                                - Dauphinois
                                - Lyonnais
                                - Bressan
                                - Forézien
                                - Jurassien
                                - Burgondan
                                - Charolais
                                - Mâconnais
                                - Diaspora Arpitan
                                  - Faetar-Cellese (Apulia Arpitan) (Faetar-Cigliàje)
                            - Old French (Franceis / François / Romanz) (extinct)
                              - Central Oïl
                                - Middle French (François/Franceis)
                                  - Francien / Francian
                                    - Francilien (Île de France Langue d'Oïl)
                                      - French (Français / Langue française)
                                        - European French
                                          - French of France / France French
                                            - Parisian
                                              - Standard French
                                            - Northern French
                                            - Meridional French / Francitan
                                          - Belgian French
                                          - Swiss French
                                          - Aostan French
                                          - Jersey Legal French
                                        - American French
                                          - Canadian French
                                            - Acadian French (Français acadien)
                                              - Chiac
                                              - Louisiana French (Cajun French) (Français louisianais)
                                            - Brayon French
                                            - Québec French (Français québécois)
                                              - Joual
                                              - Ontario French
                                                - Muskrat French / Detroit River French Canadian
                                              - New England French (Français de Nouvelle-Angleterre)
                                              - Missouri French / Illinois Country French ("Paw-Paw French")
                                          - Newfoundland French (Français terre-neuvien)
                                          - Frenchville French (Français de Frenchville)
                                        - Caribbean French
                                          - Saint-Barthélemy French (Patois Saint-Barth)
                                          - Haitian French (Français haïtien)
                                        - Guianese French
                                        - New Caledonian French (Caldoche)
                                        - African French / Sub-Saharan African French (Français africain)
                                        - Maghreb French / North African French
                                        - Indian French (Français indien)
                                        - South East Asian French
                                    - Orleanais
                                    - Blésois
                                    - Tourangeau
                                    - Percheron
                                    - Berrichon (Berrichonne)
                                    - Oïl Bourbonnais (Bourbonnais d'Oïl)
                              - Eastern Oïl
                                - Burgundian-Morvandeau (Bregognon)
                                  - Burgundian proper
                                  - Morvandiau
                                - Frainc-Comtois / Jurassian (Frainc-Comtou/Jurassien)
                                  - Saône
                                  - Doubs-Ognon
                                  - Lomont-Doubs
                                  - Ajoulot
                                  - Vâdais
                                  - Taignon
                                - Champenois (Champaignat)
                                  - Langrois
                                  - Sennonais
                                  - Troyen
                                  - Briard
                                  - Rémois
                                  - Ardennais
                                - Lorrain (Lorrain)
                                  - Nancéien
                                  - Messin
                                  - Spinalian
                                  - Deodatian
                                  - Longovician
                                  - Argonnais
                                  - Gaumais
                                  - Welche
                              - Western Oïl
                                - Angevin
                                - Mainiot
                                  - Mayennais (Low Mainiot)
                                  - Manceau / Sarthois (High Mainiot)
                                - Gallo (Galo)
                              - Northern Oïl
                                - Old Norman (Old Romance Norman)
                                  - Norman (Romance Norman) (Normaund)
                                    - Northern Norman
                                      - High Norman
                                        - Cauchois (spoken in the Pays de Caux)
                                      - Low Norman
                                        - Augeron (spoken in the Pays d'Auge)
                                        - Cotentinais (spoken in Cotentin)
                                      - Channel Islands Norman
                                        - Auregnais / Aoeur'gnaeux (extinct)
                                        - Guernésiais / Dgèrnésiais
                                        - Jèrriais
                                        - Sercquiais
                                    - South Norman
                                      - High Norman
                                        - Évreux
                                      - Low Norman
                                        - Argentanois
                                        - Alençonnois
                                        - Avranchinois
                                  - Anglo-Norman / Anglo-Norman French (Norman) (extinct)
                                    - Law French
                                - Picard (Picard)
                                  - Amiénois
                                  - Beauvaisin
                                  - Vimeu
                                  - Ponthieu
                                  - Vermandois
                                  - Thiéranchien
                                  - Artésien Rural
                                  - Cambrésien
                                  - Douaisien
                                  - Chti / Chtimi
                                  - Audomarois
                                  - Circum-Lilloises
                                  - Boulonnais
                                  - Calaisien
                                  - Dunkerquois
                                  - "Rouchi" – Tournaisin / Tournaisien (Valenciennois)
                                  - Borain / Hainaut Picard
                                - Walloon (Walon)
                                  - Western (Walon do Coûtchant / Walon Coûtchantrece) (Walo-Picård)
                                  - Central (Walon do Mitan)
                                  - Eastern (Walon do Levant)
                                  - Southern (Walon Nonnrece / Walon do Midi u Nonne)
                                  - Diaspora Wallon
                                    - Wisconsin Walloon
                              - Southwestern Oïl
                                - Poitevin-Saintongeais (Poetevin-Séntunjhaes)
                                  - Poitevin (Poetevin)
                                  - Saintongeais (Saintonjhais)
                              - Judaeo-French (Zarphatic) (צרפתית – Tzarfatit) (extinct)
                          - Moselle Romance (extinct)
                      - Southern Gallo-Romance (Occitano-Romance)
                        - Old Occitan / Old Provençal (Proensals / Proençal / Romans / Lenga d'Òc / Lemosin) (extinct)
                          - Occitan (Occitan / Lenga d'Òc / Lemosin / Provençal)
                            - Arverno-Mediterranean
                              - Provençal (Provençau [classical norm] / Prouvençau [mistralian norm])
                                - Niçard / Nissart
                                - Mentonasc
                                - Judaeo-Provençal (Shuadit / Chouadit) (שואדית – Shuadit) (extinct)
                              - Vivaro-Alpine (Alpine Provençal, Gavòt) (Vivaroalpenc / Vivaroaupenc)
                                - Gardiol (Calabria Provençal)
                              - Auvergnat (Auvernhat)
                              - Limousin (Lemosin)
                            - Croissant
                              - South Bourbonnais
                              - Marchois
                            - Central Occitan
                              - Lengadocian (Northern Lengadocian) / Lenga d' Oc)
                          - Aquitanian-Pyrenean
                            - Southern Lengadocian
                            - Gascon (Romance Gascon) (Gasco)
                              - East Gascon
                              - West Gascon
                                - Landese
                              - Pyrenean Gascon
                                - Aranese (Aranés)
                                - Béarnese
                                  - Whistled language of Aas (Béarnese dialect-based whistled language)
                              - Judeo-Gascon
                            - Old Catalan (Catalanesch) (extinct)
                              - Catalan (Modern Catalan) (Catalan–Valencian–Balearic) (Català / Llengua catalana)
                                - Eastern Catalan
                                  - Northern Catalan / Rossellonese
                                    - Capcinès
                                  - Central Catalan
                                    - Barcelona
                                      - Xava
                                    - Empordanese
                                    - Isla Cristina (extinct)
                                    - Salat
                                    - Tarragona
                                    - Transitional Northern
                                      - Cerdà
                                      - Garrotxa
                                    - Vilanova
                                  - Insular Catalan
                                    - Balearic
                                      - Ibizan
                                        - Eastern Ibizan
                                        - Western Ibizan
                                        - Villager
                                      - Mallorcan
                                        - Argentina
                                        - Botifarra (extinct)
                                        - Felanitx
                                        - Palma
                                        - Pollencí
                                        - Sineu
                                        - Sóller
                                      - Menorcan
                                        - Eastern
                                        - Floridan (extinct)
                                        - Western
                                    - Algherese Catalan (Alguerés)
                                - Western Catalan
                                  - Northwestern Catalan
                                    - Aragonese
                                    - Fragatí
                                    - Pallarès
                                    - Ribagorca
                                  - Valencian
                                    - Central
                                    - Murcian (extinct)
                                    - Northern
                                      - Castello
                                    - Southern
                                      - Alicante/Lower Southern Valencian
                                        - Carche
                                      - Upper Southern Valencian
                                  - Transitional Western
                                    - Tortosa
                                      - Matarraña
                                - Transitional Catalan
                                  - Xipella
                                    - Solsoní
                                - Argentina
                                - Malta (extinct)
                                - Catalan Roma
                                - Patuet (extinct)
                              - Judaeo-Catalan (Catalanic) (קטלאנית יהודית – Judeocatalà / קאטאלנית – Catalànic) (extinct)
                      - Iberian Romance languages / Hispano-Romance (dialect continuum)
                        - Andalusi Romance (extinct) (dialect continuum)
                        - Navarro-Aragonese / Old Aragonese (extinct)
                          - Old Riojan (extinct)
                          - Navarrese Romance (extinct)
                          - East Old Aragonese
                            - Ebro Valley Aragonese (extinct)
                            - Community of Villages Aragonese (extinct)
                            - Valencian Aragonese (extinct)
                            - Medieval High Aragonese / Pyrenean Aragonese
                              - Aragonese (Aragonés / Luenga aragonesa / Fabla aragonesa)
                                - Western Aragonese
                                  - Aisinian
                                  - Ansotano
                                  - Aragüés
                                  - Hecho
                                - Central Aragonese
                                  - Bergotés
                                  - Belsetano
                                - Eastern Aragonese
                                  - Ribagorçan
                                    - Benasquese
                                - Southern Aragonese
                                  - Navalese
                              - Judaeo-Aragonese (Chodigo-Aragonés) (Aragonit Yehudit / אראגונית יהודית) (extinct)
                        - Western Iberian Romance / Western Hispano-Romance (dialect continuum)
                          - Castilian languages (dialect continuum)
                            - Old Castilian / Old Spanish / Medieval Spanish (Romance Castellano) (extinct)
                              - Early Modern Spanish / Middle Spanish / Classical Spanish (Golden Age Spanish)
                                - Spanish / Castilian (Español / Castellano / Lengua española / Lengua castellana)
                                  - Standard Spanish
                                  - Peninsular Spanish / Spanish of Spain (European Spanish, Spanish of Europe)
                                    - Northern Spanish
                                      - Castilian proper
                                        - Old Castille Castilian
                                          - Burgalese Castilian / Burgos Castilian
                                          - Vallisoletano / Valladolid Castilian
                                        - Northeastern New Castille Castilian
                                      - Cantabrian Castilian / La Montaña Castilian
                                      - Leonese Spanish
                                      - Asturian Spanish
                                      - Galician Spanish (Castrapo)
                                      - Riojan Spanish
                                      - Navarrese Spanish
                                      - Aragonese Spanish
                                      - Churro Spanish
                                      - Basque Spanish
                                      - Catalan Spanish
                                        - Catalan Spanish Proper
                                        - Balearic Spanish
                                        - Valencian Spanish
                                    - Southern Spanish
                                      - Southern New Castille Castilian
                                        - Madridian (Madrileño)
                                        - Manchego
                                          - Toledan (Toledano)
                                      - Murcian Spanish
                                        - Central Murcian (Panocho)
                                      - Andalusian Spanish (Eastern)
                                      - Andalusian Spanish (Western)
                                        - Seseo
                                        - Ceceo
                                      - Insular
                                        - Canarian Spanish
                                          - Lanzarotan (Lanzaroteño / Conejero)
                                          - Fuerteventuran (Fuerteventureño / Majorero)
                                          - Gran Canarian (Grancanario)
                                          - Tenerifan (Tinerfeño)
                                          - Gomeran (Gomero)
                                          - Palmeran (Palmero)
                                          - Hierran (Herreño)
                                          - Canarian Diaspora
                                            - Isleño Spanish (North American Canarian Spanish)
                                  - Hispanic American Spanish / American Spanish (Spanish of the Americas)
                                    - Caribbean Spanish
                                      - Cuban Spanish
                                      - Dominican Spanish
                                      - Puerto Rican Spanish
                                      - Panamanian Spanish
                                      - Caribbean Coastal Colombian Spanish
                                      - Coastal Venezuelan Spanish
                                        - Maracucho Spanish / Zulian Venezuelan Spanish/ Marabino Spanish/ Maracaibero
                                    - Mexican Spanish
                                      - Coastal (Costeño)
                                      - Central
                                      - Northern (Norteño)
                                      - Traditional U.S. Spanish
                                        - Californio Spanish
                                          - San Juan Capistrano Spanish
                                        - Sabine River Spanish
                                        - New Mexican Spanish
                                      - Yucatan Spanish (Yucateco / Peninsular Oriental)
                                    - Central American Spanish
                                      - Chiapas Spanish (Chiapaneco)
                                      - Guatemalan Spanish
                                      - Belizean Spanish
                                      - Salvadoran Spanish
                                      - Honduran Spanish
                                      - Nicaraguan Spanish
                                      - Costa Rican Spanish
                                    - Andean Spanish / Highland Spanish (Español andino / Español de las tierras altas)
                                      - Colombian Spanish
                                      - Ecuadorian Spanish
                                      - Peruvian Spanish
                                        - Peruvian Ribereño Spanish
                                      - Bolivian Spanish
                                        - Andean Bolivian
                                        - Lower Mountain Range Bolivian (Boliviano de la sierra)
                                          - Valluno
                                          - Vallegrandino
                                        - Bolivian Lowlands (Camba)
                                        - Bolivian Gran Chaco (Chapaco)
                                      - Andean Argentinian Spanish / Northwestern Argentinian Spanish
                                      - Amazonic Spanish (Charapa Spanish / Loreto-Ucayali Spanish / Jungle Spanish)
                                        - Llanero Spanish
                                    - Southern Cone Spanish
                                      - Chilean Spanish
                                        - Northern
                                        - Southern
                                        - Chilote Spanish (Chiloé Archipelago Spanish)
                                        - Chilean Patagonian
                                      - Argentinian Spanish-Uruguayan Spanish
                                        - Central Argentinian Spanish
                                          - Cordobés Spanish
                                          - Puntano
                                        - Western Argentinian Spanish
                                          - Cuyo Spanish
                                        - River Plate Spanish (Español Rioplatense)
                                          - River Plate proper
                                            - Litoraleño (Fluvial) / River Banks (Entre Ríos + Santa Fe Provinces)
                                            - Bonaerense / Porteño (Buenos Aires City and Province + La Pampa Province)
                                            - Uruguayan Spanish
                                          - Argentinian Patagonian
                                      - Paraguayan Spanish / Guaranitic Spanish (Español guaranítico)
                                  - Philippine Spanish
                                  - Saharan Spanish
                                  - Equatoguinean Spanish / Equatorial Guinea Spanish
                                - Spanish Extremaduran (Southern-Central Extremaduran / Low Extremaduran) / Castúo
                                - Judaeo-Spanish / Ladino (לאדינו – Ladino /'גﬞודﬞיאו־איספאנייול – Djudeo-Espanyol / Judeoespañol)
                                  - Haketia
                          - Old Leonese (extinct)
                            - Astur-Leonese (Asturllionés / Astur-Llionés / Llengua astur-llionesa)
                              - Eastern Astur-Leonese (Cantabrian-Extremaduran)
                                - Cantabrian (Romance Cantabrian) (Cántabru / Montañés)
                                  - Western Cantabrian
                                  - Central Cantabrian
                                    - Pasiego (Pasiegu)
                                    - Montañés
                                  - Eastern Cantabrian
                                - Old Extremaduran / Old Extremaduran Leonese (extinct)
                                  - High Old Extremaduran (extinct)
                                    - Extremaduran (Northern Extremaduran) (Estremeñu / Artu Estremeñu)
                                      - Chinato (extinct)
                                      - Serrano / Habla de la Sierra de Francia
                                      - Bejarano (Béjar dialect)
                                      - Palra d'El Rebollal
                                  - Low Old Extremaduran (Bahu Estremeñu) (extinct)
                                    - Central Old Extremaduran (extinct)
                                    - Southern Old Extremaduran (extinct)
                              - Western Astur-Leonese (Astur-Leonese Proper)
                                - Asturian (Asturianu) and Leonese (Llionés) / Asturleonese (Asturllionés) (the division between Asturian and Leonese is extra-linguistic, dialectal varieties mainly form an east to west division pattern with north to south strips, tilted towards southwest in eastern and central varieties, and not between Asturias and Leon, only after that there is a distinction between asturian and leonese varieties)
                                  - Eastern Asturian / Eastern Asturian-Leonese Proper
                                    - Asturian
                                      - Llanes dialect
                                    - Leonese
                                      - Riberan / Riveran / Arribenian / Riberenian
                                  - Central Asturian / Central Asturian-Leonese Proper
                                    - Asturian
                                      - Gijon dialect (Xixón)
                                      - Oviedo dialect (Uviéu)
                                    - Leonese
                                      - Leonese (Leon city dialect) (extinct)
                                      - Sayaguese
                                  - Western Asturian / Western Asturian-Leonese Proper
                                    - Eastern Western Asturian-Leonese
                                      - Asturian
                                        - Pixueto (Cudillero / Cuideiru) dialect
                                      - Leonese
                                        - Omañese / Oumañese
                                        - Cepedanu
                                        - Maragato
                                        - Alistanu
                                    - Western Western Asturian-Leonese
                                      - Asturian
                                        - Luarca dialect
                                      - Leonese
                                        - Paḷḷuezu / Patsuezo / Pachuezo
                                        - Berzian-Cabreirese
                                        - Sanabrian / Senabrian (Senabrès) (Seabra)
                                          - Riudeonore-Guadramil-Deilon-Quintanilha Leonese
                                        - Mirandese (Mirandés / Lhengua Mirandesa)
                                          - Central Mirandese
                                          - Raiano Mirandese
                                          - Sendinese Mirandese
                          - Galician–Portuguese (Old Galician–Old Portuguese) (extinct)
                            - Galician (Galego / Lingua Galega)
                              - Eastern Galician
                                - Eonavian (Galician–Asturian)
                                - Central Western
                                - Portelas (Northwest Zamora Galician)
                              - Central Galician
                                - Mindoniensis
                                - Central Transitional
                                - Lucu-Auriensis (Lugo-Ourense)
                                - Eastern Transitional
                              - Western Galician
                                - Bergantiños
                                - Finisterra
                                - Pontevedra
                            - Fala
                            - Portuguese (Português / Língua portuguesa)
                              - European Portuguese / Portugal's Portuguese
                                - Northern dialects
                                  - Lower-Minhoto-Durian - High-Beiran (Baixo-Minhoto-Duriense - Alto-Beirão)
                                    - Lower Minhoto-Durian (Baixo-Minhoto-Duriense) (Nortenho) (Coastal Northern)
                                    - High Beiran - Transmontan Beiran (Alto-Beirão - Beirão Transmontano) (Northern - Northeastern Beiran)
                                      - High-Beiran (Alto-Beirão)
                                      - Transmontan Beiran (Beirão Transmontano)
                                  - High-Minhoto-Transmontan (Alto Minhoto-Transmontano) (Inland Northern)
                                    - High-Minhoto (Alto-Minhoto)
                                    - Transmontan (Transmontano)
                                - Central - Southern dialects
                                  - Coastal Central (Estremenho)
                                    - Standard European Portuguese / Standard Portugal's Portuguese
                                    - Northern Estremenho
                                    - Southern Estremenho
                                  - Inland Central - Southern
                                    - Inland Central / Interior Central
                                      - Lower-Beiran - Northern Alto-Alentejan
                                        - Northern Lower-Beiran (Baixo-Beirão do Norte)
                                        - Southern Lower-Beiran - Northern Alto-Alentejan (Baixo-Beirão do Sul - Alto-Alentejano do Norte)
                                    - Southern dialects
                                      - Ribatejan (Ribatejano)
                                      - Southern Coastal Estremenho (Estremenho Costeiro do Sul)
                                      - Setúbal Peninsula (Setubalense)
                                      - Alentejan (Alentejano)
                                        - Oliventine (Oliventino)
                                      - Algarvian (Algarvio)
                                        - Leeward Algarvian (Algarvio do Sotavento) (Eastern Algarvian)
                                        - Windward Algarvian (Algarvio do Barlavento) (Western Algarvian)
                                - Insular Portuguese
                                  - Madeiran (Madeirense)
                                    - Portosantese (Portosantense)
                                    - Madeiran (Madeirense)
                                  - Azorean (Açoriano)
                                    - Mariense
                                    - Micaelense
                                    - Terceirense
                                    - Graciosense
                                    - Jorgense
                                    - Picoense
                                    - Faialense
                                    - Florentino
                                    - Corvino
                              - Latin American Portuguese
                                - Brazilian Portuguese
                                  - Northern dialects
                                    - Amazofonia / Nortista
                                      - Metropolitan (Belém do Pará, Manáus, Porto Velho)
                                      - Bragantinense
                                      - Camataense
                                      - Amapaense
                                      - Roraimese
                                      - Acreanese
                                    - Broad Northeastern
                                      - Narrow Northeasern
                                        - Eastern Northeastern
                                        - Recifense
                                        - Central Northeastern
                                        - Western Northeastern
                                      - North Coast Northeastern
                                        - Cearense
                                          - Fortaleza
                                        - North Piauí
                                        - North Maranhense
                                    - Bahian (Baiano)
                                      - Soteropolitano (Salvador)
                                      - Coastal (Costeiro)
                                      - Inland (Interior)
                                        - Catingueiro
                                        - Geraizeiro / Fala dos Gerais (Fala das Minas dos Matos Gerais)
                                  - Southern dialects
                                    - Broad Fluminense
                                      - Fluminense
                                        - Rio de Janeiro (Carioca)
                                      - Espiritosantense (Capixaba)
                                    - Mineiro / Uplander (Montanhês)
                                    - Broad Sulista
                                      - Broad Paulista (Caipira)
                                        - Paulistano
                                          - Standard Brazilian Portuguese
                                        - Vale do Paraíba
                                        - Southern Paulista
                                        - Médio Tietê
                                        - Inland Paulista
                                        - Mineiro Triangle
                                        - Sertanejo
                                          - Goiás
                                          - Baixada Cuiabana
                                          - Campo Grande
                                          - Pantanal
                                        - Brasiliense
                                        - Serra Amazônica
                                      - Florianopolitan (Manezês)
                                      - Narrow Sulista
                                      - Gaúcho
                                        - Portoalegrense
                                - Uruguayan Portuguese / Fronteiriço
                              - African Portuguese
                                - Cape Verdean
                                - Guinean / Guinea-Bissau Portuguese
                                - Equatoguinean
                                - Sao Tomean / São Tomé and Principe Portuguese
                                - Angolan
                                - Mozambican
                              - Asian Portuguese
                                - Goan
                                - Macanese
                                - East Timorese
                              - Judaeo-Portuguese (Judeu-Português) (extinct)
                              - Mixed Portuguese-Spanish-Asturo-Leonese
                                - Barranquenho
                              - Portuguese-based Cant (Portuguese-based Cryptolect)
                                - Minderico
                  - Eastern Romance languages
                    - Proto-Romanian / Common Romanian (dialect continuum) (extinct)
                      - South
                        - Aromanian (Rrãmãneshti / Armãneashti / Armãneshce / Limba Rrãmãniascã / Limba Armãneascã / Limba Armãneshce)
                          - Northern Aromanian
                            - Farsherot
                            - Grabovean (Moscopolean)
                            - Muzachiar
                            - Gopeš–Malovište
                            - Gorna Belica–Dolna Belica
                          - Southern Aromanian
                            - Pindean Olympian
                            - Gramostean
                        - Megleno-Romanian (Vlăhește)
                          - Northern
                          - Southern
                      - North
                        - Romanian (Limba Română / Românește)
                          - Old Romanian (Daco-Romanian)
                            - Modern Romanian
                              - Romanian dialects (Graiuri)
                                - Northern Romanian
                                  - Banatian (Bănățean)
                                  - Moldavian (Moldovenesc)
                                    - Moldovan
                                    - Bukovinian Romanian dialect
                                  - Transylvanian (Ardelenesc)
                                    - Crișanian
                                    - Maramureșian (Maramureșean)
                                - Southern Romanian
                                  - Dician (Dobrujan) (extinct)
                                  - Oltenian (Oltenesc)
                                  - Wallachian (Muntenian) (Muntenesc)
                        - Istro-Romanian (Rumârește, Vlășește)
                          - Northern
                          - Southern
                          - Krko-Romanian (extinct)
                - Southern Romance
                  - Insular Romance (dialect continuum)
                    - Sardinian (Sardu or Lingua Sarda / Limba Sarda)
                      - Logudorese-Nuorese
                        - Logudurese
                        - Nuorese
                      - Campidanese
                        - Cagliaritano (Casteddaiu)
                  - African Romance (extinct)

== Celtic languages ==
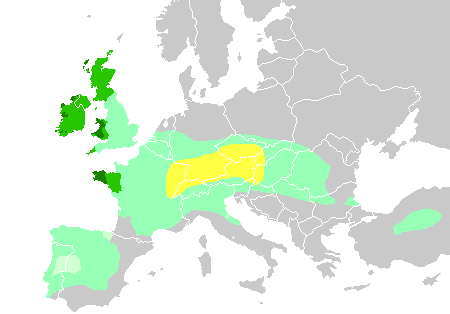
Diachronic distribution of Celtic language speakers: core Hallstatt territory, by the 6th century BCE maximal Celtic expansion, by 275 BCE Lusitanian and Vettonian area of Iberian Peninsula where Celtic presence is uncertain, Para-Celtic? the six Celtic nations which retained significant numbers of Celtic speakers into the Early Modern period areas where Celtic languages remain widely spoken today

A map of the modern distribution of the Celtic languages. Red: Welsh; Purple: Cornish; Black: Breton; Green: Irish; Blue: Scottish Gaelic: Yellow: Manx. Areas where languages overlap are shown in stripes.

- Proto-Celtic (extinct)
  - Continental Celtic (all extinct)
    - Eastern Celtic
      - Noric (?)
      - Galatian
    - Lepontic
    - Gaulish
      - Cisalpine Gaulish
    - Hispano-Celtic
      - Celtiberian
      - Gallaecian
  - Insular Celtic
    - Brittonic / British (P Celtic)
      - Common Brittonic / Old Brittonic (extinct)
        - Southwestern Brittonic (dialect continuum)
          - Old Cornish (extinct)
            - Middle Cornish (extinct)
              - Cornish (Modern Cornish) (Kernowek)
          - Old Breton (extinct)
            - Middle Breton (extinct)
              - Breton (Modern Breton) (Brezhoneg)
                - Trégorrois (Tregerieg)
                - Léonard (Leoneg)
                - Cornouaillais (Kerneveg)
                - Vannetais (Gwenedeg)
                  - Batz-sur-Mer (extinct)
        - Western Brittonic (dialect continuum)
          - Old Welsh (extinct)
            - Middle Welsh (extinct)
              - Welsh (Modern Welsh) (Cymraeg / y Gymraeg)
                - Southeastern (Gwenhwyseg)
                - Southwestern (Dyfedeg)
                - Central-Northeastern (Powyseg)
                - Northwestern (Gwyndodeg)
                  - Cofi
                - Patagonian Welsh (Cymraeg y Wladfa)
          - Cumbric (extinct)
          - Ivernic? (hypothetical) (extinct)
      - Pictish (extinct)
    - Goidelic (Q Celtic) (dialect continuum)
      - Primitive Irish (extinct)
        - Old Irish (Goídelc) (extinct)
          - Middle Irish (Gaoidhealg) (extinct)
            - Irish / Irish Gaelic (Modern Irish) (Gaeilge)
              - Standard Irish (An Caighdeán Oifigiúil)
              - Leinster Irish (extinct)
              - Connacht Irish (Gaeilge Chonnacht)
              - Munster Irish (Gaelainn na Mumhan)
                - Newfoundland Irish (in Newfoundland) (extinct)
              - Ulster Irish (Gaeilg Uladh / Canúint Uladh) (in Ulster) (Tuaisceartach – Northern)
                - Antrim Irish (extinct)
            - Scottish Gaelic (Gàidhlig) (not to be confused with Scots or Scottish English)
              - Mid-Minch Gaelic (Gàidhlig Meadhan na Mara) (Standard Scottish Gaelic)
              - Hebridean / Hebridean Gaelic
              - East Sutherland Gaelic (Gàidhlig Chataibh) (extinct)
              - Canadian Gaelic / Cape Breton Gaelic
              - Galwegian Gaelic (extinct)
              - Arran Gaelic (extinct)
              - Deeside Gaelic (extinct)
              - Beurla Reagaird (Scottish Gaelic-based cant)
            - Manx Gaelic (Gaelg / Gailck)
              - Northern Manx (Gaelg y Twoaie)
              - Douglas Manx (?) (Gaelg Ghoolish)
              - Southern Manx (Gaelg y Jiass)

== Germanic languages ==
Germanic languages in the World. Countries and sub-national entities where one or more Germanic languages are spoken. Dark Red: First language; Red: Official or Co-Official language, Pink: Spoken by a significant minority as second language.

- Proto-Germanic (extinct)
  - East Germanic / Oder-Vistula Germanic (extinct)
    - Gothic
      - Crimean Gothic
      - Ostrogoth
      - Visigoth
      - Gepid (?)
    - Vandalic
    - Burgundian (?)
    - Herulian (?)
    - Skirian (?)
  - Northwest Germanic
    - West Germanic
      - Elbe Germanic / Irminonic / Herminonic
        - Langobardic / Lombardic (extinct)
        - Suebian (extinct)
          - High German languages
            - Old High German
              - Middle High German
                - Early New High German
                  - New High German
                    - Central German / Middle German
                      - East Central German
                        - Old Thuringian (extinct)
                          - Thuringian-Upper Saxon
                            - Thuringian
                              - Central Thuringian
                                - West Thuringian
                                - East Thuringian
                              - North Thuringian
                            - Upper Saxon
                              - Easterlandic
                              - Meißen dialect
                              - Erzgebirgisch
                              - Northwestern Bohemian
                              - North Upper Saxon-South Marchian
                          - Lusatian
                            - Low Lusatian German
                          - Silesian–Vilamovian
                            - Silesian German (Schlesisch)
                              - West Silesian
                              - Lowland Silesian
                              - Middle / Central Silesian
                              - Mountain Silesian
                                - Löwenbergisch
                                - Schweidnitzisch
                                - Glatzisch
                              - South-East Silesian
                                - Oelsisch
                                - Briegisch
                                - Strehlisch
                            - Vilamovian-Haltsnovian (Bielsko-Biała language island)
                              - Wymysorys / Vilamovian (Wilmesaurisch)
                              - Haltsnovian / Altsnerisch
                          - High Prussian
                            - Oberländisch
                              - Rosenbergisch
                            - Breslau(i)sch / Ermländisch
                    - Standard German / Standard High German
                      - German Standard German
                      - Austrian Standard German
                        - Prague German (extinct)
                      - Swiss Standard German
                        - Liechtenstein variety
                      - Brazilian German
                        - Plattdüütsch/Vestfaliano
                    - Upper German
                      - High Franconian German
                        - German
                          - American German
                            - Texas German
                            - Wisconsin German
                          - Berlin
                          - Hannover
                          - Mansfeld
                          - Namibian German
                            - Namibian Black German
                        - East Franconian
                          - Lower East Franconian
                            - Itzgründisch
                          - Upper East Franconian
                            - Vogtlandian
                          - South East Franconian
                        - South Franconian / South Rhine Franconian (Südfränkisch)
                          - Low Neckar
                          - Enzian
                      - Swabian-Alemannic
                        - Swabian
                          - East Swabian
                          - West Swabian
                            - Low Swabian
                            - Upper Swabian
                        - Alemannic
                          - Low Alemannic German / Upper Rhine Alemannic
                            - Alsatian
                              - Alsatian diaspora
                                - Colonia Tovar German
                            - North Breisgau
                            - Basel German
                          - Lake Constance Alemannic (Bodenseealemannisch)
                          - High Alemannic German
                            - Vorarlbergisch
                            - Liechtensteinisch
                            - Eastern
                              - Zürich German
                            - Western
                              - Bernese German
                          - Highest Alemannic
                            - Walliser German
                            - Walser
                      - Bavarian / Austro-Bavarian
                        - Northern Bavarian (Upper Palatine / Bavarian Nordgau)
                        - Central Bavarian
                          - Mostviertel
                            - Amstetten
                          - Viennese German
                        - Southern Bavarian
                          - Tirolese
                            - Old Hutterite German (extinct)
                              - Hutterite German
                          - Carinthian / German Carinthian
                          - Gottscheerish
                          - Tyrol
                        - Mòcheno (Bersntoler sproch)
                        - Cimbrian (Tzimbar)
                          - Lusernese
                          - Sette Comuni
                          - Tredici Communi
      - Weser–Rhine Germanic / Istvaeonic
        - West Central German
          - Rhine Franconian / Rhenish Franconian
            - Hessian
              - Amana
              - North Hessian
              - Central Hessian
              - East Hessian
              - South Hessian
            - Pfälzisch–Lothringisch
              - Palatine German (Lower Palatine)
                - Palatine diaspora
                  - Bukovina (extinct)
                  - Pennsylvania Dutch / Pennsylvania German
              - Lorraine Franconian
            - Hessian-Palatine Koiné (Hessian-Palatine diaspora)
              - Volga German
          - Central Franconian / Middle Franconian
            - Moselle Franconian
              - East Moselle Franconian
                - Siegerländisch
                - Untermosellanisch
                - Trierisch
                - Hunsrückisch
              - West Moselle Franconian
                - West-Westerwäldisch
                - Southern Eifel
                - Luxembourgish
              - Moselle Franconian diaspora
                - Zipser-Gründlerisch
                  - Gründlerisch (Lower Zipser)
                  - Upper Zipser
                - Transylvanian Saxon
            - Ripuarian / Ripuarian Franconian
              - Bönnsch
              - Old Colognian (extinct)
                - Colognian
              - Kerkrade
              - Öcher Platt
              - Northern Eifel
          - Yiddish / Jewish German / Judeo-German
            - Western Yiddish
              - Midwestern
              - Southwestern
                - Judeo-Alsatian
              - Northwestern
            - Transitional Yiddish dialects
              - Western (Bohemia, Moravia, west Slovakia, and west Hungary Yiddish)
              - Eastern (Hungarian lowlands, Transylvania, and Carpathian Rus Yiddish)
            - Eastern Yiddish
              - Middle / Central Yiddish (Poylish or Polish Yiddish)
              - Southeastern Yiddish (Ukrainish or Ukrainian Yiddish)
              - Northern / Northeastern Yiddish (Litvish or Lithuanian Yiddish)
              - Udmurtish
                - Southern
                - Central
              - Klezmer-loshn (extinct)
        - Low Franconian languages
          - Old Low Franconian
            - South Low Franconian / East Low Franconian
              - Meuse-Rhenish
                - Bergish
                - Limburgish
                  - Southeast Limburgish - Ripuarian transitional area
                    - Eupen
                  - East Limburgish
                    - Sittard
                  - Central Limburgish
                    - Maastrichtian
                    - Weert
                  - West Limburgish
            - West Low Franconian / North Low Franconian
              - Middle Dutch
                - Dutch
                  - Kleverlandish
                  - Central Dutch
                    - Hollandic
                      - Utrechts-Alblasserwaards
                      - South Hollandic
                        - The Hague
                          - Scheveningen
                        - Afrikaans
                          - Kaaps
                          - Eastern Cape
                            - Orange River
                          - Namibian Afrikaans
                          - Patagonian Afrikaans
                      - Amsterdams
                      - Zaans
                      - West Frisian Dutch
                    - Surinamese Dutch
                    - Indonesian Dutch
                  - Brabantian
                    - East Brabantian
                    - South Brabantian
                      - Brusselian
                      - Getelands
                    - West Brabantian
                      - Antwerpian
                    - Brabantian diaspora
                      - Pella Dutch / Iowa Dutch
                  - Flemish
                    - East Flemish
                    - West Flemish-Zeelandic
                      - West Flemish
                        - Bruges
                        - French Flemish
                      - Zeelandic
                        - Jersey Dutch
      - North Sea Germanic / Ingvaeonic
        - Old Low German
          - Middle Low German
            - Low German / Low Saxon
              - Northern Low German
                - Northern Low Saxon
                  - Schleswigsch
                  - Holsteinisch
                  - Dithmarsisch
                  - Hamburgisch
                    - Traditional Hamburgisch
                      - Finkwarder Platt
                      - Olwarder Platt
                      - Veerlanner Platt
                      - Barmbeker Platt
                  - Elb-Weserländisch
                  - North Hannoverian
                  - Emslandish
                  - Oldenburgisch
                    - Bremian
                  - Friso-Saxon / Frisian Low Saxon
                    - East Frisian Low Saxon
                    - Gronings
                      - Noord-Drents
                      - Hogelandsters
                      - Oldambtsters
                      - Stadsgronings
                      - Veenkoloniaals
                      - Westkwartiers
                        - Kollumerpompsters
                        - Kollumerlands
                        - Middaglands
                        - Midden-Westerkwartiers
                        - Zuid-Westerkwartiers
                      - Westerwolds
                - East Low German
                  - Marchian (Märkisch) / 'Brandenburgian (Brandenburgisch)
                    - North Marchian
                    - Middle Marchian
                    - Middle Pomeranian Marchian
                    - Old South Marchian (extinct)
                  - Mecklenburgian-West Pomeranian
                    - Mecklenburgian
                    - Wendlandian
                    - Strelitzisch
                    - West Pomeranian / Fore Pomerania
                  - East Pomeranian / Farther Pomeranian (not to be confused with Slavic Pommeranian)
                    - Coastal
                      - West Coastal
                      - East Costal
                      - Bublitzer
                    - Inland
                      - South
                      - Pomerelian
                    - Koschneiderisch
                  - Low Prussian
                    - West Low Prussian
                      - Vistulan / Weichseler
                        - Dantzigian
                      - Werdersch
                      - Nehrungisch
                      - West Low Prussian diaspora
                        - Plautdietsch / Mennonite Low German (Low Saxon, Frisian and Flemish substrates)
                    - East Low Prussian
                      - Elbingian
                      - Mundart des Kürzungsgebiets
                      - Westkäslausch
                      - Ostkäslausch
                      - Natangian
                      - Samlandic
                      - Niederungish
                      - Eastern Low Prussian / Easternmost Low Prussian
              - Southern Low German
                - Eastphalian
                  - Heide-Ostfälisch
                  - Central Eastphalian
                  - Bördeplatt
                  - Bode-Ostfälisch
                  - Göttingisch-Grubenhagensch
                - Westphalian
                  - East Westphalian
                  - South Westphalian
                  - Stellingwarfs
                  - Münsterländisch
                  - Westmünsterländisch
                  - Gelders-Overijssels
                    - Achterhooks
                    - Sallands
                    - Urkers
                  - Veluws
                    - Oost-Veluws
                    - West-Veluws
                  - Drents
                    - Midden-Drents
                    - Zuid-Drents
                  - Tweants
                - Grafschafter Platt
                - Emsländer Platt / Nordemsländisch
                - Westerwolds
        - Anglo-Frisian languages
          - Anglic languages
            - Old English (extinct)
              - Angles dialects
                - Mercian / Southumbrian
                - Old Northumbrian
              - Jutes dialect
                - Old Kentish
              - Saxons dialect (Insular Saxon, West Saxon)
                - West Saxon
              - Middle English (extinct)
                - Midland
                  - East Midland
                  - West Midland
                - Northern
                  - Early Scots (extinct)
                    - Middle Scots (extinct)
                      - Scots
                        - Southern Scots
                        - Ulster Scots
                          - Glenoe
                        - Central Scots
                          - Ayrshire
                          - Berwick
                          - Glasgow
                        - Northern Scots
                          - South Northern Scots
                          - Mid Northern Scots
                          - North Northern Scots
                            - Cromarty (extinct)
                        - Insular Scots
                          - Orcadian
                          - Shetland
                  - Fingallian (extinct)
                  - Yola (extinct)
                - Kentish (Middle English)
                - Southern (Middle English)
                - Early Modern English
                  - Modern English
                    - English
                      - Standard English
                      - European English
                        - British English
                          - English English
                            - Received Pronunciation
                            - East Anglian English
                              - Norfolk dialect
                                - Suffolk dialect
                                - Essex dialect
                            - East Midlands English
                            - West Midlands English
                              - Birmingham dialect
                              - Black Country dialect
                              - Potteries dialect
                            - North English
                              - Yorkshire dialect
                              - Northumbrian
                                - Geordie / Tyneside
                                - Pitmatic
                                - Mackem
                                - Smoggie
                              - Manchester dialect
                              - Liverpool dialect / Scouse
                              - Cheshire dialect
                              - Lancashire dialect
                              - Cumbrian dialect
                                - Barrovian dialect
                            - South English
                              - Kentish dialect
                              - Estuary English / London Regional General British
                                - Cockney
                                - Multicultural London English
                              - Sussex dialect
                              - Surrey dialect
                              - West Country English
                                - Dorset dialect
                                - Wiltshire dialect
                                - Bristolian dialect
                          - Cornish English
                          - Welsh English
                            - Abercraf English
                            - Cardiff English
                            - Gower English
                            - Port Talbot English
                          - Scottish English
                            - Bungi English
                            - Glasgow English
                            - Highland English
                          - Manx English
                        - Hiberno-English
                          - Dublin English
                            - South-West Irish English
                            - Mid-Ulster English
                        - Channel Islands English
                          - Alderney English
                          - Guernsey English
                          - Jersey English
                        - Gibraltarian English
                        - Maltese English
                        - Euro English
                      - North American English
                        - Canadian English
                          - Standard Canadian English
                          - Ottawa Valley English
                          - Pacific Northwest Canadian English
                          - Atlantic Canadian English
                            - Newfoundland English
                            - Canadian Maritime English
                            - Lunenburg English
                            - Quebec Canadian English
                          - First Nations English / Aboriginal English in Canada
                        - American English
                          - General American English
                            - Eastern New England English
                              - Western New England English
                            - Northern American English
                              - Inland Northern American English
                            - North Central American English
                            - New York City English
                            - Midland American English
                              - Mid-Atlantic American English
                                - Philadelphia English
                                - Western Pennsylvania English
                            - Western American English
                              - Pacific Northwest American English
                              - California English
                          - Southern American English
                            - Older Southern American English
                              - Appalachian English
                              - African American English / Black American English
                                - African-American Vernacular English
                            - Cajun English
                          - Chicano English
                      - Caribbean English
                        - Bermudian English
                        - Bahamian English
                        - Turks and Caicos Creole
                        - Belizean English
                        - Cayman Islands English
                          - Bay Islands English
                        - Jamaican English
                        - Samaná English
                        - Puerto Rican English
                        - Barbadian English
                        - Trinidadian and Tobagonian English
                        - Guyanese English
                      - South Atlantic English
                      - Falkland Islands English
                      - Oceanian English
                        - Australian English
                          - Broad Country Australian English
                          - Cultivated Australian English
                          - General Australian English
                            - Queensland Kanaka English
                          - South Australian English
                          - Western Australian English
                          - Australian Aboriginal English
                          - Torres Strait English
                        - New Zealand English
                          - Māori English
                        - Fiji English
                        - Palauan English
                        - Papuan English
                        - Solomon Islands English
                      - Jewish English
                        - Yeshivish
                      - Asian English
                        - East Asian English
                          - Hong Kong English
                            - Chinglish
                        - South Asian English
                          - Bangladeshi English
                          - General Indian English
                            - Butler English
                          - Maldivian English
                          - Nepalese English
                          - Sri Lankan English
                          - Pakistani English
                            - Urdish/Urglish
                        - Southeast Asian English
                          - Brunei English
                          - Burmese / Myanmar English
                          - Cambodian English
                          - Malaysian English
                          - Manglish
                          - Philippine English
                            - Bislish
                            - Taglish
                              - Coño English
                              - Swardspeak
                          - Singapore English
                          - Singlish
                          - Thai English
                      - African English
                        - Cameroonian English
                        - Gambian English
                        - Ghanaian English
                        - Kenyan English
                        - Liberian English
                        - Malawian English
                        - Namibian English
                        - Nigerian English
                        - Sierra Leonean English
                        - South African English
                          - Cape Flats English
                          - Black South African English
                          - Indian South African English
                          - White South African English
                          - South Atlantic English
                        - Tanzanian English
                        - Ugandan English
                        - Zimbabwean English
                        - Zulu English
                      - Antarctic English
            - Frisian languages
              - Old Frisian
                - Middle Frisian
                  - North Frisian
                    - Mainland dialects
                      - Wiedingharde Frisian
                      - Bökingharde Frisian
                      - Goesharde Frisian
                        - Northern Goesharde Frisian
                        - Central Goesharde Frisian
                        - Southern Goesharde Frisian (extinct)
                      - Strand Frisian
                        - Halligen Frisian
                      - Karrharde Frisian
                      - Eiderstedt Frisian (extinct)
                        - Halligen Frisian
                    - Island dialects
                      - Heligoland Frisian
                      - Fohr-Amrum
                        - Föhr Frisian
                        - Amrum Frisian
                      - Sylt Frisian
                  - East Frisian
                    - Ems Frisian
                      - Saterland Frisian
                      - Upgant Frisian (extinct)
                      - Emsingoa Frisian (extinct)
                      - Brokmerland Frisian (extinct)
                      - Ommelanden Frisian (extinct)
                    - Weser Frisian
                      - Harlingerland Frisian (extinct)
                      - Wangerooge Frisian (extinct)
                      - Wursten Frisian (extinct)
                  - West Frisian
                    - Hindeloopen Frisian
                    - Schiermonnikoog Frisian
                    - Terschelling Frisian
                    - Mainland West Frisian
                      - Clay Frisian
                      - Wood Frisian
                        - Westereendersk
  - North Germanic
    - Proto-Norse/Proto-Scandinavian (extinct)
      - Old Norse (extinct)
        - East Scandinavian
          - Old East Norse (extinct)
            - Old Gutnish (extinct)
              - Gutnish
                - Mainland Gutnish
                - Fårömål
            - Old Swedish (extinct)
              - Early Modern Swedish
                - Late Modern Swedish
                  - Modern Swedish
                    - Swedish
                      - Standard Swedish
                      - Swedish dialects
                        - Svealandic
                          - Stockholm dialects
                          - Uppländska
                        - North Swedish
                          - Luleå
                          - Kalix
                          - Kiruna dialect
                        - East Swedish
                          - Åland Swedish
                          - Estonian Swedish
                          - Ostrobothnian
                        - Götalandic
                          - Northern Smålandic
                        - Rinkeby Swedish
                  - Swedish Dalarna
                  - Swedish Scanian
            - Old Danish (extinct)
              - Middle Danish (extinct)
                - Danish
                  - Standard Danish
                  - Danish dialects
                    - East Danish
                      - Old Scanian / Danish Scanian
                      - Bornholmsk
                    - Insular Danish
                      - Zealandic Danish
                      - Southern Islands Danish
                      - Funen
                    - Jutlandic
                      - East
                      - West
                      - South
                        - Angel Danish (extinct)
                  - Danish-based standards
                    - Dano-Norwegian
                      - Norwegian Riksmål
                        - Norwegian Bokmål
                          - Urban East Norwegian
                    - Gøtudanskt
                    - Perkerdansk
          - Dalecarlian
            - Elfdalian
        - West Scandinavian
          - Old West Norse (extinct)
            - Old Norwegian (extinct)
              - Middle Norwegian (extinct)
                - Norwegian
                  - Norwegian Standards
                    - Norwegian Høgnorsk
                      - Landsmål
                        - Norwegian Nynorsk
                    - Samnorsk (Nynorsk-Bokmål Koiné)
                    - Dano-Norwegian
                      - Riksmål
                        - Norwegian Bokmål
                  - Norwegian dialects
                    - Østnorsk
                      - Vikværsk
                      - Urban East Norwegian
                        - Oslo dialect
                      - Dølamål
                      - Hallingmål-Valdris
                      - Gudbrandsdalsmål
                    - Vestnorsk
                      - Arendal dialect
                      - Sandnes dialect
                      - Stavanger dialect
                      - Bergensk
                      - Sognamål
                    - Trøndersk
                      - Trondheimsk
                      - Medalsk
                      - Jamtlandic
                    - Nordnorsk
                      - Brønnøy dialect
                    - Kebabnorsk
                    - Norwegian diaspora
                      - American Norwegian
                - Early Faroese
                  - Old Faroese
                    - Faroese
                - Norn (extinct)
                - Old Icelandic
                  - Icelandic
                    - High Icelandic
                  - Greenlandic Norse (extinct)

== Balto-Slavic languages ==
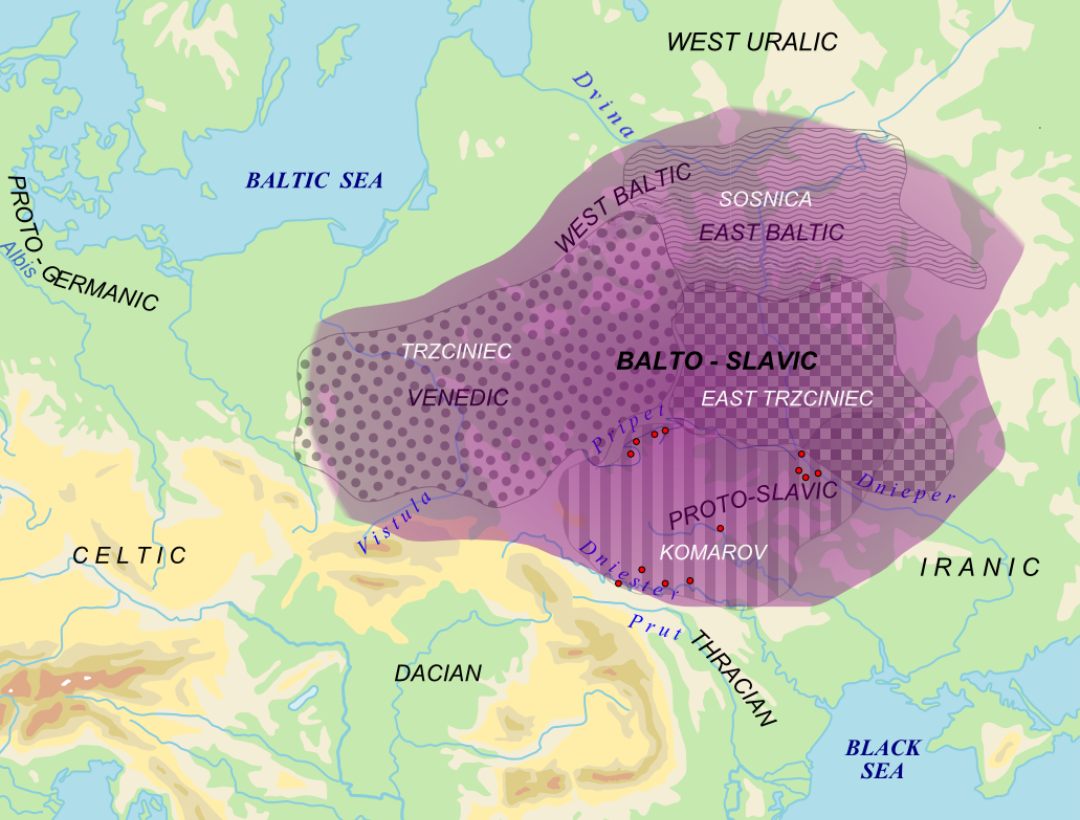
Area of Balto-Slavic dialect continuum with proposed material cultures correlating to speakers Balto-Slavic in Bronze Age . Red dots=archaic Slavic hydronyms.

Political map of Europe with countries where a Slavic language is a national language marked in shades of green and where a Baltic language is a national language marked in light orange. Wood green represents East Slavic languages, pale green represents West Slavic languages, and sea green represents South Slavic languages. Contemporary Baltic languages are all from the same group: Eastern Baltic

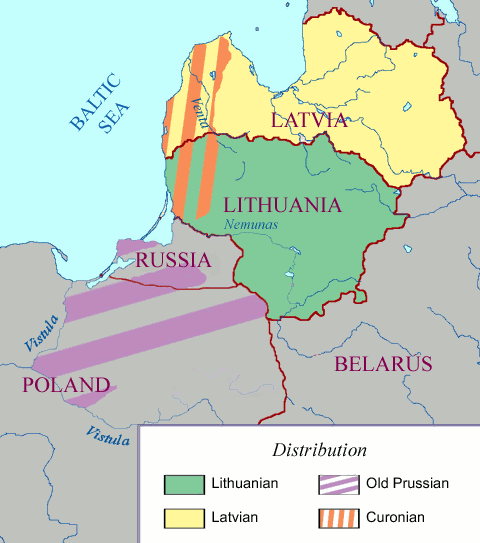
Baltic languages (extinct languages shown in stripes).

Slavic languages in Europe . Areas where languages overlap are shown in stripes.

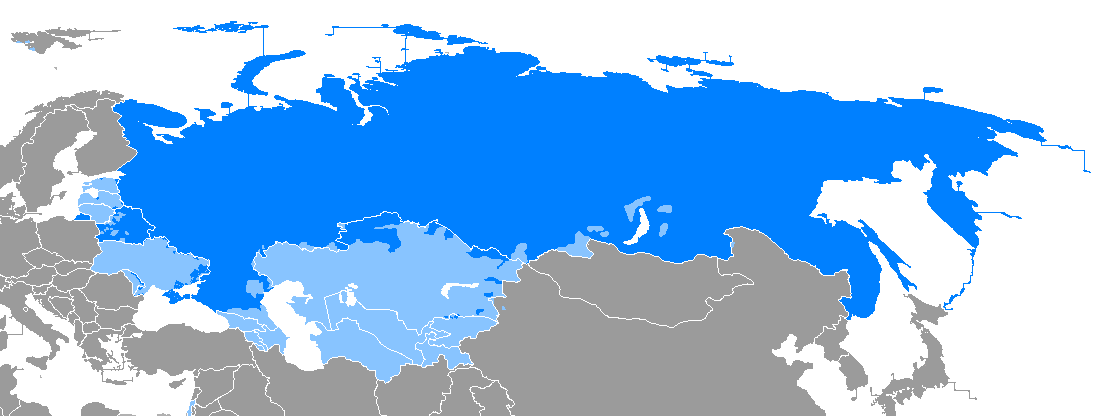
Russian Language – Map of all the areas where the Russian language is the language spoken by the majority of the population. Russian is the biggest Slavic language both in number of first language speakers and in geographical area where the language is spoken .

- Proto-Balto-Slavic (extinct)
  - Baltic languages
  - Slavic languages

=== Baltic languages ===
- Proto-Baltic (extinct)
  - Dnieper-Oka (extinct)
    - Golyad / East Galindian (extinct)
  - Eastern Baltic
    - Old Latvian (Old Latgalian) (extinct)
      - Latvian / Broad Latvian
        - Latvian dialects
          - Latgalian / High Latgalian / High Latvian (Highland Latvian)
            - Standard Latgalian
            - Latgalian dialects
              - Latgalian Proper / Non-Selonic
              - Selonic
          - Latvian (Lowland Latvian)
            - Middle / Central
              - Standard Latvian
              - Middle / Central Proper / Vidzeme / Low Latgalian
              - Semigallic
              - Curonic / Latvian Curonian
                - Kursenieki / Curonian Isthmus Latvian / New Curonian
            - Livonic Latvian / Tamian
              - Vidzeme Livonic / Central Region Livonic
              - Courland / North Courland Livonic / Tāmnieku
    - Selonian (extinct)
    - Semigallian (extinct)
    - Old Lithuanian (extinct)
      - Lithuanian / Broad Lithuanian
        - Lithuanian dialects
          - Aukštaitian (Highland Lithuanian)
            - Standard Lithuanian
            - Highland Lithuanian dialects
              - Eastern
              - Western
                - Suvalkian / Sudovic Aukštaitian
              - Southern / Dzūkian
          - Samogitian (Lowland Lithuanian)
            - Southern
            - Northern / Curonic Samogitian
            - Western
  - Western Baltic
    - Old Prussian / Baltic Prussian (extinct)
      - New Prussian (Revived Prussian)
    - Skalvian (extinct)
    - West Galindian / West Galindian (extinct)
    - Sudovian / Yatvingian (extinct)
    - Curonian / Old Curonian? (extinct)
    - Pomeranian Baltic (extinct)

=== Slavic languages ===
- Proto-Slavic (extinct)
  - East Slavic languages
    - Old East Slavic / Common East Slavic / Old Russian (broad sense of East Slavic) (extinct)
      - Southern Old East Slavic (all East Slavic except Old Novgorodian)
        - Ruthenian / Southwestern-Southern-Central Old East Slavic (extinct)
          - Southwestern Old East Slavic
            - Rusyn
              - Carpathian Rusyn
                - Hutsul / Eastern Carpathian
                - Boyko / North Carpathian
                - Transcarpathian
                - Lemko / West Carpathian
              - Pannonian Rusyn / Bačka Rusyn (East Slavic influenced by Slovak or a West Slavic language closer to Slovak)
          - Southern Old East Slavic
            - Ukrainian
              - Ukrainian dialects
                - Southwestern Ukrainian (Western Southern Ukrainian)
                  - Volhynian-Podilian
                    - Volhynian
                    - Podolian
                  - Galician–Bukovinian
                    - Dniestrian / Upper Dniestrian / Opilia
                    - Upper Sannian
                    - Pokuttia–Bukovina
                    - Diaspora dialect
                      - Canadian Ukrainian
                - Southeastern Ukrainian (Eastern Southern Ukrainian)
                  - Middle Dnieprian
                    - Standard Ukrainian
                    - Balachka / Kuban
                  - Slobozhan
                  - Steppe
                - Northern Ukrainian / Polesian / Polisian
                  - East Polesian
                  - Central Polesian
                  - West Polesian
                    - Motolian
          - Central Old East Slavic
            - Belarusian
              - Belarusian dialects
                - Southwestern Belarusian
                - Middle Belarusian
                - Northeastern Belarusian
        - Northeastern Old East Slavic
          - Middle Russian
            - Russian
              - Russian dialects
                - Spoken mainly by Ethnic Russians
                  - Southern Russian
                    - Western / Russian-Belarusian
                    - Upper Dnieperian
                    - Upper Desnian
                    - Kursk-Orel / Orlovsky
                    - Tulian
                    - Yeletsian
                    - Oskolian
                    - Ryazanian
                    - Southern Russian Diaspora
                      - Doukhobor
                  - Central-Northern
                    - Central Russian / Middle Russian
                      - West Central
                        - Pskovian
                        - Lake Peipus
                        - Gdovian
                        - Novgorodian
                        - Torzhokian
                        - Saint-Petersburgish
                          - Standard Russian (Saint-Petersburg Norm)
                      - East Central
                        - Moscow
                          - Standard Russian (Moscow Norm)
                        - Vladimirian-Volgan / Tverian-Vladimirian-Volgan
                        - Chukhlomian (dialect island/enclave)
                        - Astrakhan
                    - Northern Russian
                      - Ladogan-Tikhvinian
                      - Belozeran-Bezhetsian
                      - Onegan
                      - Lachian
                      - Kostromian
                      - Vologdan
                      - Pomor
                      - Siberian
                        - Alaskan
                  - Russian Diaspora dialects (see Geographical distribution of Russian speakers)
                    - Neighbouring countries of Russia (spoken by ethnic Russians)
                      - Ukrainian
                      - Belarusian
                      - Latvian Russian
                      - Lithuanian Russian
                      - Estonian Russian
                      - Kazakh Russian
                    - Eastern Europe
                      - Transnistrian Russian
                    - North America
                      - American Russian
                - Spoken by Non-Ethnic Russians (overlapping with native languages)
                  - In Eastern Europe
                    - Ukrainian (spoken by Ukrainians, not ethnic Russians)
                    - Belarusian (spoken by Belarusians, not ethnic Russians)
                    - Moldovan Russian (spoken by Moldovans, not ethnic Russians)
                  - In Russia
                    - European Russia
                      - Mordvin Russian
                      - Mari Russian
                      - Udmurt Russian
                      - Komi Russian
                      - Karelian Russian
                      - Chuvash Russian
                      - Tatar Russian
                      - Bashkir Russian
                    - Siberia / Asian Russia
                      - Buryat Russian
                      - Chukchi Russian
                      - Tuvan Russian
                    - Russian Caucasus
                      - Ossetian Russian
                      - Circassian Russian
                      - Abkhaz Russian
                      - Chechen Russian
                      - Dagestani Russian
                  - In Southwest Asia / Middle East
                    - Georgian Russian
                    - Armenian Russian
                      - Artsakh/Nagorno-Karabakh Armenian
                    - Azerbaijani Russian
                    - Israeli Russian (spoken by ethnic Jews)
                  - In Central Asia
                    - Kazakh Russian
                    - Kyrgyz Russian
                    - Uzbek Russian
                    - Turkmen Russian
                    - Tajik Russian
      - Northern / Northwestern Old East Slavic (extinct)
        - Proto-Novgorodian-Pskovian (extinct)
          - Old Novgorodian (extinct)
          - Old Pskovian (extinct)
    - Mixed East Slavic languages
      - Mixed Russian-Belarusian-Ukrainian
        - Goryun / Horyun
      - Mixed Russian-Ukrainian
        - Surzhyk
          - Odesan
  - West Slavic languages
    - Lechitic
      - East Lechitic
        - Old Polish (extinct)
          - Middle Polish (extinct)
            - Polish
              - Greater Polish
                - Bory Tucholskie
                - Chełmno-Dobrzyń
                - Central Greater Poland
                - Eastern Greater Poland
                - Kociewie
                - Krajna
                - Kujawy
                - Northern Greater Poland
                - Southern Greater Poland
                - Western Greater Poland
              - Lesser Polish
                - Biecz
                - Kielce
                - Eastern Kraków
                - Eastern Lublin
                - Lasovia
                - Limanowa
                - Łęczyca
                - Masovian Borderland
                - Podegrodzie
                - Przemyśl
                - Sieradz
                - Western Kraków
                - Western Lublin
                - Goral
                  - Babia Góra
                  - Bukovinian
                  - Kliszczak
                  - Kysuce
                  - Liptov
                  - Łącko
                  - Ochotnica
                  - Orawa
                  - Pieniny
                  - Piwniczna
                  - Podhale
                  - Spisz
                  - Zagórze
                  - Żywiec
              - Southern Borderlands dialect
              - Masovian / Mazovian
                - Białystok
                - Far Masovian
                - Kurpie
                - Łowicz
                - Lubawa
                - Masurian
                - Near Masovian
                - Ostróda
                - Podlachian
                - Suwałki
                - Warmian
                - Warsaw
              - Northern Borderlands dialect
              - New Mixed Dialects
        - Silesian / Upper Silesian / Slavic Silesian
          - Cieszyn
          - Lower Silesian
            - Chwalin (extinct)
          - Sulkovian
          - Prudnik
          - Niemodlin
          - Lachian
          - Texan
      - Middle Lechitic
        - Pomeranian
          - Kashubian
          - Slovincian (extinct)
          - Western Pomeranian (extinct)
      - West Lechitic (extinct)
          - Rani
          - Marcho-Magdeburgian
          - Polabian / Drevanian / Lüneburg Wendish (extinct)
          - Western Pomeranian
    - Czech-Slovak
      - Czech
        - Bohemian (Czech proper)
          - Biblical Czech
          - Standard Czech
          - Common Czech
            - Czechoslovak
          - Central Bohemian
          - Northeastern Bohemian
          - Southwestern Bohemian
        - Moravian
          - Bohemian–Moravian
          - Central Moravian
          - Eastern Moravian
          - Moravian Wallachian
      - Slovak / Slovakian
        - Western Slovak
          - Camaldolese Slovak
        - Central Slovak
        - Eastern Slovak
          - Pannonian Rusyn
      - Knaanic (extinct)
    - Sorbian
      - Lower Sorbian
        - Schleifer
      - Upper Sorbian
  - South Slavic languages
    - Western South Slavic
      - Old Slovene / Alpine Slovene (=Slavic) / Carantanian
        - Slovene
          - Slovene dialects (dialect groups)
            - Southeastern
              - Eastern
                - Pannonian
                  - Prekmurje Slovene
                - Northern Styrian
              - Southern
                - Southern Styrian
                - Upper Carniolan
                - Eastern Rovte
                - Lower Carniolan
                  - Southeastern Littoral
            - Northwestern
              - Northern
                - Carinthian
                - Resian
              - Western
                - Soča-Idrija
                  - Western Rovte
                - Venetian-Karst
                  - Northwestern Littoral
      - Kajkavian-Chakavian-Shtokavian / Central South Slavic
        - Kajkavian
          - Gora
          - Križevci–Podravina
          - Lower Sutla
          - Prigorje
          - Turopolje–Posavina
          - Zagor–Međimurje
        - Chakavian
          - Central Chakavian / Middle Chakavian
            - Burgenland Croatian
          - Southern Chakavian
          - Southeastern Chakavian
          - Southwestern Istrian
          - Northern Chakavian
          - Buzet
        - Shtokavian
          - Western Shtokavian
            - Old Western Shtokavian
              - Slavonian (Archaic Šćakavian)
                - Šokac
              - Eastern Bosnian (Jekavian-Šćakavian)
            - New Western Shtokavian
              - Bosnian–Dalmatian (Western Ikavian / Younger Ikavian)
                - Bosnian-West Herzegovinian
                - Dalmatian
                  - Slavomolisano
                - Bunjevac
            - New Southern Shtokavian
              - Southeastern
                - Užican / Užice / Zlatibor
                - Eastern Herzegovinian (Neo-Ijekavian)
                  - Serbo-Croatian standards / Bosnian-Croatian-Montenegrin-Serbian
                    - Serbian
                    - Croatian
                    - Bosnian
                    - Montenegrin
              - Northwestern
                - Krajina
              - Southwestern
                - Dubrovnik subdialect (Western Ijekavian)
          - Eastern Shtokavian
            - Old Eastern Shtokavian
              - Smederevo–Vršac
              - Kosovo–Resava / Resava-North Kosovo (Older Ekavian)
              - Zeta–Raška / Zeta-South Sandžak (Đekavian-Ijekavian)
            - New Eastern Shtokavian
              - Šumadija–Vojvodina (Younger Ekavian)
      - Torlakian
        - Serbian Torlakian
          - Timok-Prizren / South Morava - South Kosovo
            - Timok-Lužnica
            - Svrljig-Zaplanje
            - South Morava-Prizren
        - Transitional Bulgarian dialects (closer to Torlakian)
          - Belogradchik dialect
          - Breznik dialect
          - Tran dialect
        - Northern Macedonian (closer to Torlakian)
          - Kriva Palanka dialect
          - Kumanovo dialect
          - Skopska Crna Gora dialect
          - Tetovo dialect
        - Gora dialect (Torlakian ou Slavic Macedonian)
        - Romanian Torlakian
          - Krashovani (ethnically Croatian but closer to Torlakian in dialect)
    - Eastern South Slavic
      - Old Slavonic / Old Church Slavonic (not exclusively ecclesiastical) / Old East South Slavic (extinct)
        - Church Slavonic Proper
          - Old Church Slavonic
            - Church Slavonic
        - Modern East South Slavic (Slavic Bulgarian-Slavic Macedonian)
          - Bulgarian (Slavic Bulgarian)
            - Western Bulgarian
              - Northwestern
                - Vidin-Lom dialect
                - Byala Slatina-Pleven dialect
              - Southwestern
                - Vratsa dialect
                - Botevgrad dialect
                - Ihtiman dialect
                - Samokov dialect
                - Elin Pelin dialect
                - Sofia dialect
                - Dupnitsa dialect
                - Kyustendil dialect
            - Eastern Bulgarian
              - Moesian
                - Shumen dialect
              - Balkan
                - Central Balkan dialect
                - Kotel-Elena-Dryanovo dialect
                - Panagyurishte dialect
                - Pirdop dialect
                - Teteven dialect
                - Erkech dialect
                - Subbalkan dialect
              - Rup / Southeastern Bulgarian
                - "True" Rup
                  - Strandzha dialect
                  - Thracian dialect
                  - Ser-Drama-Lagadin-Nevrokop dialect
                - Babyak dialect
                - Razlog dialect
                - Zlatograd dialect
                - Rhodopean
                  - Hvoyna dialect
                  - Chepino dialect
                  - Smolyan dialect / Central Rhodope
                    - Pomak dialect
                  - Paulician dialect
                    - Banat Bulgarian
            - Macedonian (Slavic Macedonian)
              - Standard Macedonian
                - Spoken Macedonian
              - Eastern-Southern
                - Eastern
                  - Maleševo-Pirin dialect
                  - Štip-Kočani dialect
                  - Strumica dialect
                - Southern
                  - Southeastern
                    - Ser-Drama-Lagadin-Nevrokop dialect
                    - Solun-Voden dialect
                  - Southwestern
                    - Kostur dialect
                    - Nestram-Kostenar dialect
              - Western
                - Central
                  - Skopje-Veles dialect
                  - Kičevo-Poreče dialect
                  - Prilep-Bitola dialect
                - Peripheral dialects
                  - Gostivar dialect
                  - Galičnik dialect
                  - Reka dialect
                  - Debar dialect
                  - Ohrid dialect
                  - Struga dialect
                  - Upper Prespa dialect
                  - Lower Prespa dialect
                  - Vevčani-Radožda dialect

== Indo-Iranian languages ==
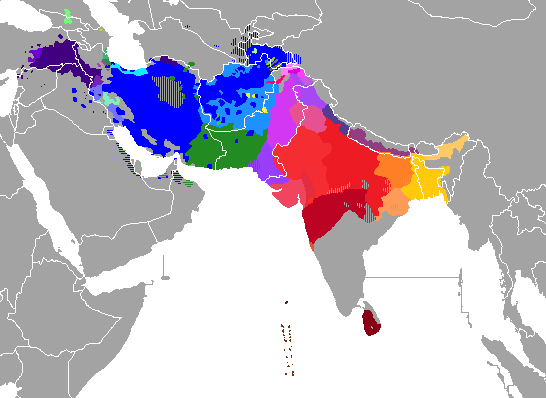
Geographic distribution of modern Indo-Iranian languages. Blue, dark purple and green colour shades: Iranic languages. Dark pink: Nuristani languages. Red, light purple and orange colour shades: Indo-Aryan languages. Areas where languages overlap are shown in stripes.

- Proto-Indo-Iranian (extinct)
  - Iranian languages
  - Nuristani languages
  - Indo-Aryan languages
  - Badeshi (unclassified)

=== Iranian languages ===
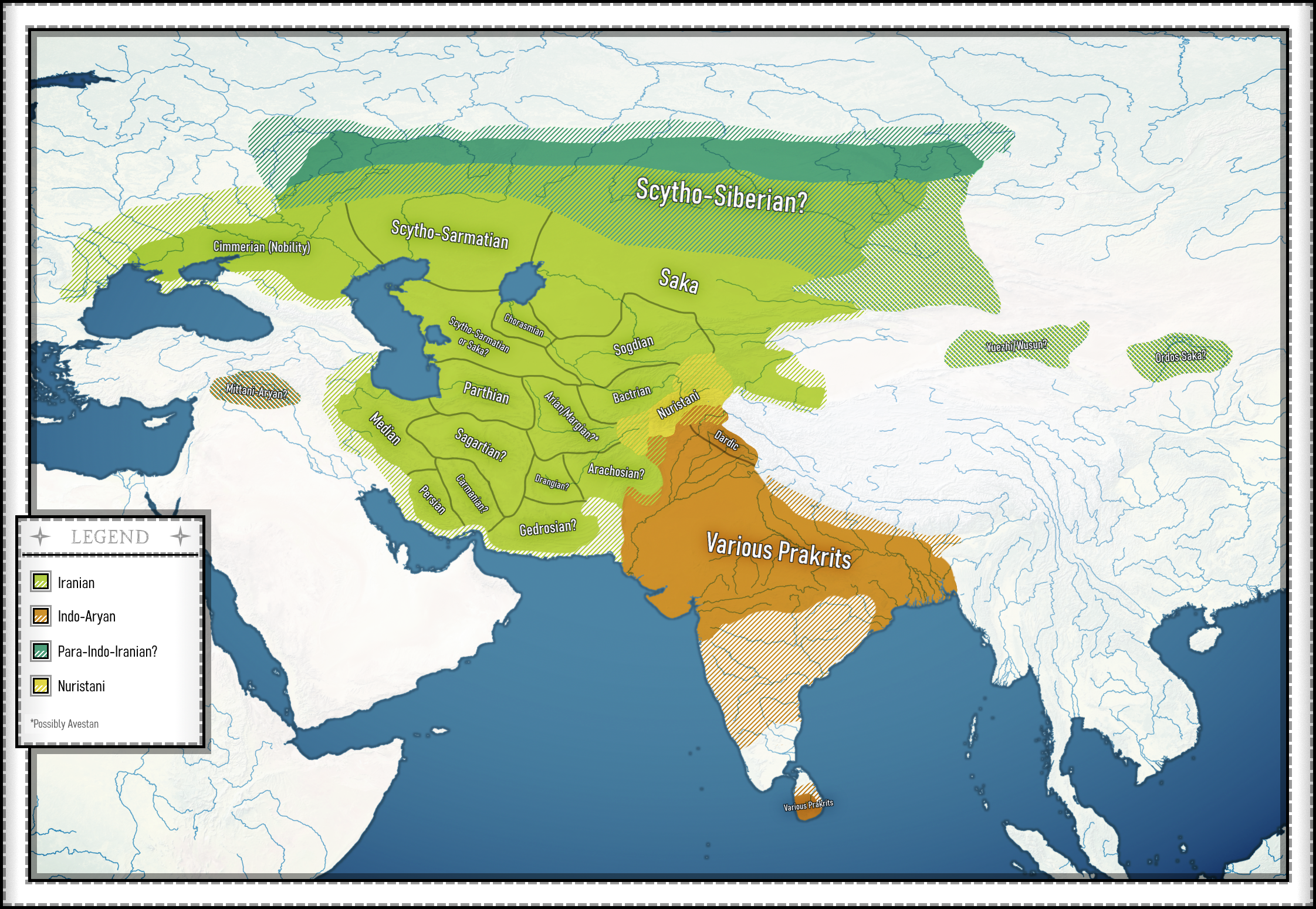
Map of Attested and Hypothetical Old Indo-Iranian Dialects. Indo-Iranian languages descend from the language spoken by the Sintashta Culture people that lived in the plains beyond the southeast Ural Mountains, between the upper Ural and Tobol rivers basins. Old Iranian languages, were spoken in a large Eurasian landmass area that included most of south Eastern Europe, south west Siberia, Central Asia, including parts of western China, and the Iranian Plateau. The Scythian languages, that belonged to the Northern Eastern Iranian languages subgroup, were the ones with the biggest geographical distribution, they were spoken in most of the steppe and desert areas of Eastern Europe and Central Asia, matching most of the western half of the Eurasian steppe, which corresponds to modern southern European Russia and south Russian west Siberia and parts of southern central Siberia, modern southern Ukraine, an enclave in the east Pannonian Basin, in modern Hungary, all of modern Kazakhstan, parts of modern Xinjiang, in Western China, modern Kyrgyzstan, and parts of modern Uzbekistan and modern Turkmenistan. Later Scythian languages were also present in northern India by migration of part of the ancient Iranian peoples forming the Indo-Scythians. This was the geographical distribution until the first centuries AD, after that time, Turkic migration and conquests along with Turkification, made many ancient Iranian languages go extinct.

Distribution of modern Iranian Languages

- Proto-Iranian
  - Eastern Iranian languages
    - Northeastern Iranian languages
      - Old Northeast Iranian
        - Scytho-Sarmatian
          - Cimmerian (extinct)
          - Pontic Scythian (extinct)
          - Sarmatian (extinct)
            - Alanic (extinct)
              - Ossetian
                - Iron Ossetian
                - Digor Ossetian
                  - Jassic (extinct)
          - Scytho-Khotanese (extinct)
            - Tumshuqese (extinct)
            - Kanchaki (extinct)
            - Khotanese (extinct)
          - Khwarazmian / Chorasmian (extinct)
          - Sogdian (extinct)
            - Yaghnobi
    - Southeastern Iranian languages
      - Old Southeast Iranian
        - Avestan (extinct)
          - Old Avestan / "Gathic Avestan" (extinct)
            - Young Avestan / Younger Avestan (extinct) (extinct)
        - Old Pakhto
          - Pakhto / Pashto / Pathan
            - Northern Pashto
              - Northern dialect
              - Yusufzai dialect
                - Central Pashto
            - Southern Pashto
              - Durrani dialect
                - Bannuchi dialect Tsalga
                - Wazirwola dialect
                - Masidwola dialect
          - Wanetsi
        - Ormuri-Parachi
          - Ormuri
          - Parachi
        - Bactrian (extinct)
        - Pamir languages
          - Yidgha-Munji branch
            - Munji
              - Northern Munji
              - Southern Munji
            - Yidgha
            - Sarghulami (extinct)
          - North Pamir branch
            - Vanji / Old Wanji (extinct)
            - Yazgulyam
            - Darwozi
          - Shughni-Rushani branch
            - Rushani
              - Bartangi
            - Shughni / Khughni
              - Khufi
              - Oroshori
            - Sarikoli / Tashkorghani
          - Sanglechi-Ishkashimi
            - Sanglechi / Zebaki
            - Ishkashimi
          - Wakhi (Note: The inclusion of Wakhi among the Pamir languages is debated. Some scholars place it within the Pamir branch, others relate it more closely to Saka.)
  - Western Iranian languages
    - Northwestern Iranian languages / Northern Western Iranian
      - Median / Medic (extinct)
        - Razi (extinct)
      - Kurdish
        - Southern Kurdish
          - Kalhor
          - Kordali
          - Korouni
          - Laki
        - Central Kurdish / Sorani
          - Hewlêrî Kurdish
        - Kurmanji
      - Zaza-Gorani
        - Zaza
          - Northern Zaza
          - Southern Zaza
        - Gorani
          - Hawrami
          - Bajelani
          - Sarli
          - Shabaki
      - Old Azeri (extinct)
      - Tati
        - Alviri-Vidari
        - Eshtehardi
        - Harzandi
          - Kilit (extinct)
        - Khalkhal
        - Kho'ini
        - Maraghei
        - Takestani
        - Tatoid
        - Upper Taromi
        - Vafsi
      - Karingani
      - Kabatei
      - Rudbari
      - Taromi
      - Talysh
      - Gozarkhani
      - Kajali
      - Koresh-e Rostam
      - Razajerdi
      - Shahrudi
      - Ashtiani
      - Judeo-Hamedani-Borujerdi
        - Judeo-Borujerdi
        - Judeo-Hamedani
      - Khunsari
      - Northwestern Fars
      - Judeo-Golpaygani (extinct)
      - Gazi
        - Jarquya'i
        - Judeo-Esfahani
      - Soi / Sohi
        - Abuzaydabadi
        - Judeo-Kashani
      - Sivandi
      - Natanzi
        - Natanzi Proper
      - Zoroastrian Dari
        - Yazdi
      - Nayini / Na'ini / Biyabanak
      - Khuri
      - Balochi
        - Northern Baloch
          - Western Baloch
            - Rakhshani
            - Sarhadi / Sarhaddi
          - Eastern Baloch
        - Southern Baloch
          - Lashari
            - Makrani
        - Koroshi / Koroshi Balochi
    - Parthian (extinct)
    - Caspian
      - Semnani
        - Semnani proper
          - Biyabunaki
        - Sangsari / Sangisari
        - Lasgerdi-Sorkhei
          - Lasgerdi
          - Sorkhei
            - Aftari
      - Mazanderani / Tabari
        - Gorgani (extinct)
      - Daylami / Daylami (extinct)
      - Gilaki
        - Western Gilaki
        - Eastern Gilaki
    - Southwestern Iranian languages/Southern Western Iranian
      - Old Persian (𐎠𐎼𐎹 – Ariya) (extinct)
        - Middle Persian (𐭯𐭠𐭫𐭮𐭩𐭪 – Pārsīk or Pārsīg) (extinct)
          - Persian
            - Indo-Persian (extinct)
            - Iranian Persian
              - Abadani
              - Basseri
              - Esfahani
              - Kermanshahi
              - Khorasani
              - Kuwaiti
              - Tehrani
            - Dari / Afghanistan Persian
              - Sistani
              - Hazaragi / Hazaragi Persian
            - Pahlavni / Pahlavani (extinct)
            - Judeo-Persian
            - Aimaq / Aimaqi / Aimaq Persian
            - Tajik / Tajiki Persian
              - Bukharian
          - Tat / Caucasus Tat / Persian Tat
            - |Muslim/Christian Tat
              - Armeno-Tat
            - Judeo-Tat / Judeo-Persian Tat
      - Kuhmareyi
        - Davani dialect
      - Luri
        - Southern Luri
          - Mamasani
        - Northern Luri / Central Luri
        - Bakhtiari
    - Khuzestani Persian
    - Dezfuli–Shushtari
      - Dezfuli
      - Shushtari
    - Achomi
      - Judeo-Shirazi
    - Garmsiri
    - Bashkardi / Bashagerdi / Bashaka
    - Kumzari
    - Khargi
    - Old Kazeruni (extinct)
  - Unclassified Iranian
    - Kambojan (extinct)

=== Nuristani languages ===
Nuristan Province in Afghanistan, where most speakers live.

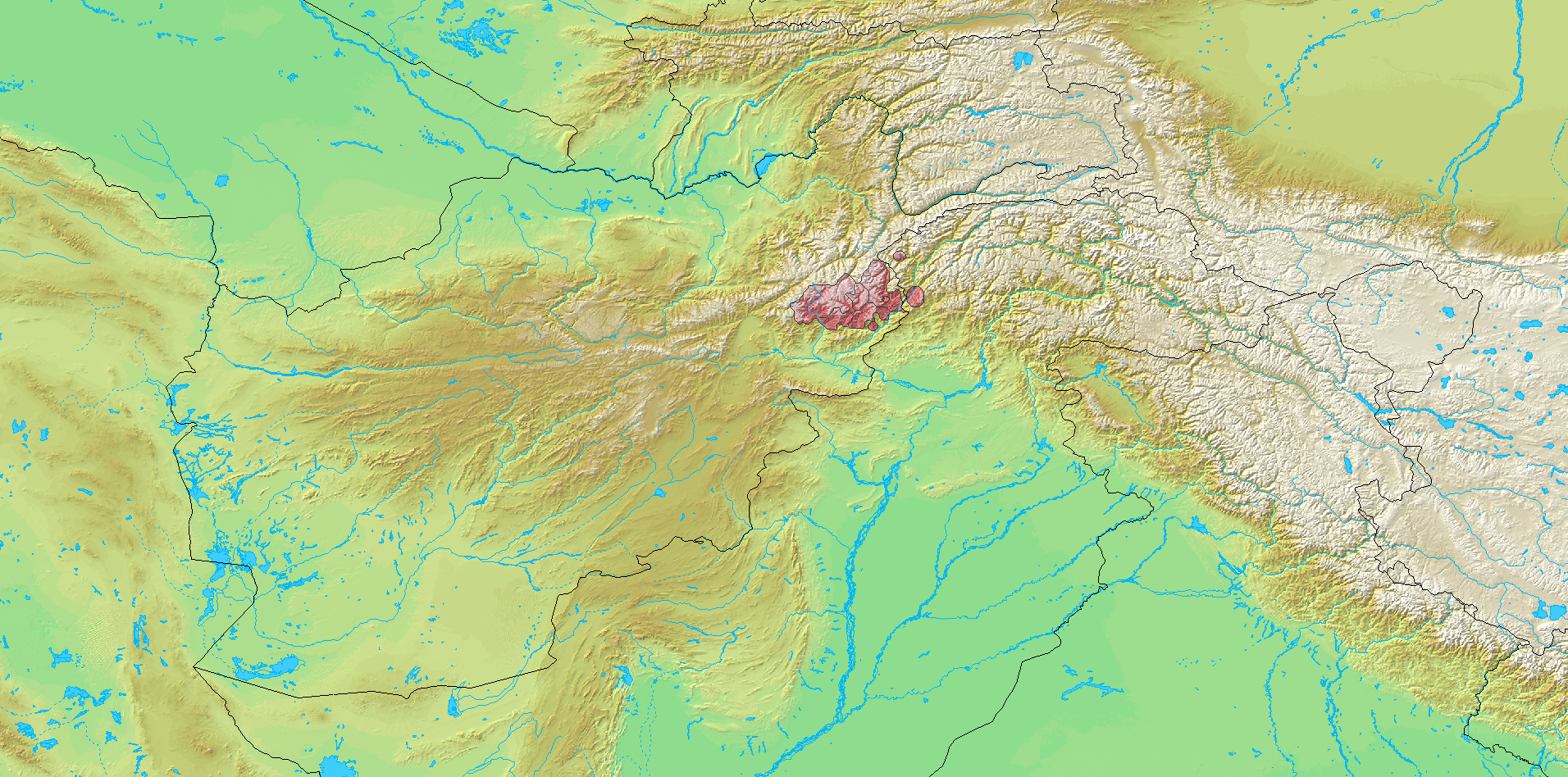
Nuristani languages.

- Proto-Nuristani
  - Prasun / Vâsi-vari
  - Ashkun–Katë–Waigali
    - Ashkun–Katë
      - Ashkun / Saňu-viri
      - Katë / Kati / Kâmkata-vari
        - Western Katë
        - Northeastern Katë
          - Shekhani
        - Southeastern Katë
          - Kamviri
          - Mumviri
    - Nuristani Kalasha–Tregami
      - Nuristani Kalasha / Kalasha-alâ
        - Zemiaki
      - Tregami
  - Dameli?

=== Indo-Aryan languages ===
Present-day geographical distribution of the major Indo-Aryan language groups. Romani, Domari, Kholosi and Lomavren are outside the scope of the map. Colours indicate the branches – yellow is Eastern, purple is Dardic, blue is Northwestern, red is Southern, green is Western, brown is Northern and orange is Central. Data is from "The Indo Aryan Languages" as well as census data and previous linguistic maps. Dardic Pashai Chitrali Shina Kohistani Kashmiri Northwestern Punjabi Sindhi Western Rajasthani Gujarati Bhili Khandeshi Northern Himachali-Dogri Garhwali-Kumaoni Nepali Central Western Hindi Eastern Hindi Eastern Bihari Bengali-Assamese Odia Halbi Southern Marathi-Konkani Sinhala-Maldivian

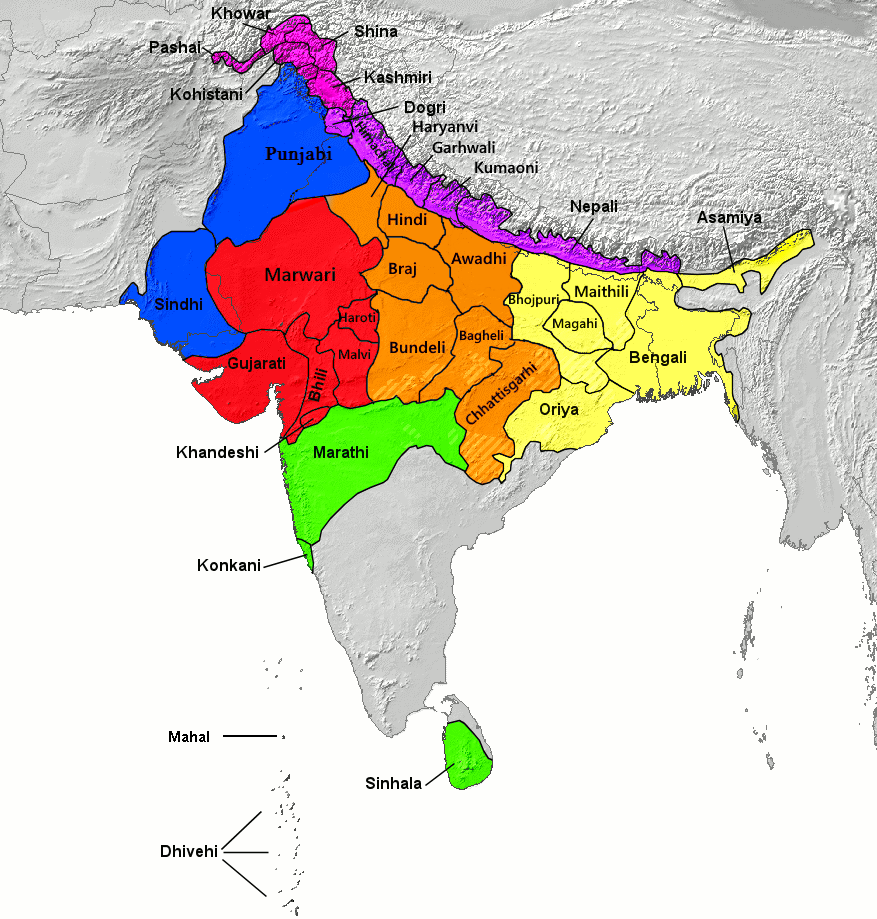
Distribution of major Indo-Aryan languages. Urdu is included under Hindi. Romani, Domari, and Lomavren are outside the scope of the map.) Dotted/striped areas indicate where multilingualism is common. Dardic Northwestern Northern Western Central Eastern Southern

Romani languages and dialects in Europe. Romani languages are part of the Indo-Aryan branch of Indo-European languages but are spoken out of the Indian Subcontinent. They are related to the Domari languages and are scattered and minority languages in all regions, overlapping with other peoples and their languages in Europe. The Domari and Romani languages are spoken in a vast geographical area from Southwest Asia to Europe and North Africa but are minoritary and scattered in all the regions in part because Domari and Romani speakers, the Doma and the Roma, were traditionally nomadic peoples.

- Proto-Indo-Aryan (extinct)
  - Old Indo-Aryan (extinct)
    - Mitanni-Aryan (extinct)
    - Early Old Indo-Aryan – Vedic Sanskrit / Rigvedic Sanskrit
      - Ashokan Prakrit (extinct)
      - Late Old Indo-Aryan – Sanskrit
        - Middle Indo-Aryan (extinct)
          - Dardic
            - Gandhari Prakrit (extinct)
              - Niya Prakrit / Kroraina Prakrit / Niya Gāndhārī (extinct)
              - Chitral languages
                - Kalasha-mun
                - Khowar
              - Kashmiri / Koshur
                - Kashtawari / Kishtwari
                - Poguli
                - Rambani
              - Kohistani languages
                - Bateri
                - Chilisso
                - Gowro / Gabaro
                - Indus Kohistani
                - Kalami / Gawri
                - Tirahi / Dardù
                - Torwali
                - Wotapuri-Katargalai (extinct)
                  - Wotapuri
              - Pashayi / Pashai
                - Southwest Pashayi
                - Southeast Pashayi
                  - Laghmani
                - Northwest Pashayi
                  - Gulbahar
                - Northeast Pashayi
                  - Korangal
              - Kunar languages
                - Dameli
                - Gawar-Bati / Narsati / Aranduyiwar
                - Nangalami / Grangali
                - Shumashti
              - Shina languages
                - Palula / Phalura / Ashreti
                - Sawi / Savi / Sauji
                - Kalkoti / Goedijaa
                - Ushoji / Ushojo
                - Kundal Shahi
                - Shina
                  - Gilgiti
                  - Astori
                  - Drasi
                - Kohistani Shina
                  - Palasi
                  - Kolai
                - Brokskat / Dah-Hanu
                - Domaaki / Dumaki / Dawoodi
          - North-Western Indo-Aryan
            - Punjabi languages
              - Lahnda / Western Punjabi
                - Pahari-Pothwari / Pothohari
                  - Pothwari / Pothohari
                    - Mirpuri
                  - Pahari / Dhundi-Kairali
                    - Poonchi / Punchhi
                - Hindko
                  - Northern Hindko
                    - Hazara Hindko / Kaghani
                  - Southern Hindko
                    - Peshawari
                      - Chhachi / Chacchi / Chachi
                      - Kohati
                      - Awankari
                      - Ghebi
                - Saraiki
                  - Derawali
                  - Thali
                    - Multani
                    - Riasti / Bhawalpuri / Choolistani
              - Punjabi
                - Standard Punjabi
                  - Western Punjabi/Eastern Saraiki
                    - Dhani
                    - Shahpuri
                    - Jhangochi / Changvi / Jhangvi / Rachnavi
                    - Jangli
                    - Chenavari
                      - Majhi
                  - Eastern Punjabi
                    - Doabi
                    - Puadhi / Pawadhi / Poadhi
                    - Malwai / Malwi
              - Lubanki / Labanki (extinct) (it was spoken by the Labana tribe
              - Jakati / Jataki (extinct)
              - Khetrani / Jafri (earlier suggestion that Khetrani might be a remnant of a Dardic language)
            - Sindhi languages
              - Jadgali–Lasi
                - Jadgali
                - Lasi
              - Kholosi
              - Kutchi / Kachchi
              - Luwati / Lawati /
              - Memoni / Kathiawadi
              - Sindhi Bhili
              - Sindhi
                - Lari
                - Siraiki / Northern Sindhi / "Siroli"
                - Thareli
          - Northern Indo-Aryan
            - Western Pahari
              - Dogri
              - Kangri
              - Mandeali / Chambeali
              - Kullu / Kulvi
              - Jaunsari
              - Pahari Kinnauri
              - Sirmauri
              - Hinduri / Handuri
              - Mahasu Pahari
                - Baghati
                - Rampuri / Kochi
            - Central Pahari
              - Garhwali
                - Badhani
                - Nagpuriya
                - Salani
                - Bangani
                - Jaunpuri
                - Gangadi
              - Kumaoni
              - Doteli / Dotyali
                - Bajhangi / Bajhangi Nepali
            - Eastern Pahari
              - Jumli
                - Sinja
              - Palpa (extinct)
              - Nepali / Khas Kura / Parbatiya / Gorkhali
                - Bajhangi
          - Western Indo-Aryan
            - Gurjar apabhraṃśa
              - Rajasthani
                - Marwari / Marwari Proper
                - Dhatki / Thari
                - Mewati
                  - Godwari language
                - Dhundari / Jaipuri
                - Mewari
                - Shekhawati
                - Goaria
                - Godwari
                  - Balvi
                  - Khuni
                  - Sirohi
                - Jogi
                - Loarki / Gade Lohar
                - Bagri / Bagari
                - Gujari / Gurjari / Gojri
                - Gurgula
                - Harauti
                - Lambadi / Lamani / Gor-Bol / Banjari
                - Malvi / Malwi / Malavi
                  - Ujjaini
                  - Rajawadi
                  - Rangri
                - Nimadi / Nimari
              - Gujarati
                - Old Gujarati (extinct)
                  - Middle Gujarati (extinct)
                    - Gujarati
                      - Kathiawari
                      - Parsi Gujarati
                      - Lisan ud-Dawat
                - Jandavra / Jhandoria
                - Vaghri / Waghri / Baghri
                - Aer
                  - Parkari Koli
                  - Kachi Koli
                  - Wardiyara Koli / Tharadari
                - Sauraseni Prakrit (extinct)
                  - Saurashtra
                - Vasavi / Vasavi Bhil
            - Bhil
              - Gamit
                - Bauria
                - Vaghri / Bavri
                - Wagdi
                - Bhilori
                  - Dungra
                - Magari
              - Central Bhil
                - Bhili proper
                  - Rajput Garasia
                - Bhilali
                  - Bhilali proper
                  - Rathawi
                  - Parya Bhilali
                - Chodri / Chowdhary
                - Dhodia-Kukna
                - Dubli
              - Bareli
                - Palya Bareli
                - Pauri Bareli
                - Rathwi Bareli
                - Pardhi / Bahelia
              - Kalto
            - Khandeshi
              - Khandeshi
              - Ahirani
              - Dhanki / Dangri
            - Domari-Romani
              - Domari
                - Karachi / Garachi (extinct)
              - Seb Seliyer
              - Romani
                - Balkan Romani
                  - Rumelian
                  - Sepeči
                  - Zargari
                - Vlax Romani
                  - Kalderash Romani
                  - Lovari
                    - Machvano
                  - Anglo-Northwestern Romani
                    - Finnish Romani
                    - Sinte Romani (Sintenghero / Tschib(en) / Sintitikes / Manuš / Romanes)
                    - Welsh-Romani
                  - Baltic Romani
                - Northern Romani
                  - Carpathian Romani
                    - North-Central Romani
                      - Bohemian Romani (extinct)
                      - East Slovak Romani
                      - West Slovak Romani
                      - South Polish Romani
                    - South-Central Romani
                      - Romungro / Romungro Romani
                      - Roman / Roman Romani
                      - Vend / Vend Romani
          - Central Indo-Aryan
            - Sauraseni Prakrit (extinct)
              - Western Hindi
                - Hindustani
                  - Hindi / Manak or Shuddh Hindi
                    - Modern Standard Hindi
                    - Mumbai Hindi
                  - Urdu / Lashkari
                    - Modern Standard Urdu
                    - Dakhini / Dakkhani / Deccani
                      - Hyderabadi Urdu / Northern Dakhni
                      - Southern Dakhni
                    - Dhakaiya Urdu
                    - Rekhta
                  - Sansi / Sansiboli / Bhilki
                  - Kabutra
                  - Braj
                  - Kannauji
                  - Kauravi
                - Bundeli / Bundelkhandi
                - Bhaya
                - Ghera / Bara
                - Gowli
                - Haryanvi
              - Parya
              - Ardhamagadhi Prakrit (extinct)
                - Awadhi
                  - Fiji Hindi
                - Bagheli
                - Surgujia / Sargujia / Surgujia Chhattisgarhi / Bhandar
                - Chhattisgarhi
          - Eastern Indo-Aryan
            - Magadhi Prakrit (extinct)
            - Pali (extinct)
              - Apabhramsa Avahatta / Abahattha (extinct)
                - Bihari languages
                  - Bhojpuri
                    - Mauritian Bhojpuri
                    - Caribbean Hindustani
                      - Guyanese Hindustani
                      - Sarnami Hindustani / Sarnami Hindoestani
                  - Magahi / Magadhi
                  - Khortha
                  - Maithili
                    - Angika
                    - Thēthi
                    - Bajjika
                  - Kurmali / Kudmali / Panchpargania / Tamaria
                  - Musasa
                  - Sadri / Sadani / Nagpuri
                  - Oraon Sadri
                - Bengali-Assamese languages
                  - Bengali
                    - Bangali / Vangi
                        - Dobhashi
                        - Christian Bengali
                        - Dhakaiya Kutti or Puran Dhakaiya
                        - Mymensinghi
                    - Manbhumi
                    - Rarhi
                        - Shadhubasha
                        - Chôlitôbhasha
                    - Sundarbani
                    - Varendri
                  - Sylheti
                  - Chittagonian / Chattal
                  - Rohingya
                  - Kurmukar
                  - Bishnupriya Manipuri
                  - Chakma
                  - Tangchangya
                  - Hajong
                  - Noakhali
                  - Kayort
                  - Kharia Thar
                  - Lodhi (?)
                - Kamarupi Prakrit / Kamrupi Apabhramsa (extinct)
                  - Surjapuri / Surajpuri
                  - Rangpuriya / Rangpuri / Rajbanshi / Rajbangsi / Kamtapuri / Deshi Bhasha / Uzani
                    - Kamtapuri
                    - Rajbanshi
                    - Rangpuri
                  - Old Assamese
                    - Assamese
                      - Standard Assamese
                      - Goalpariya
                      - Kamrupi / Kamarupi
                - Odia languages
                  - Old Odia
                    - Odia proper
                      - Singhbhumi Odia
                      - Baleswari Odia
                      - Ganjami Odia
                      - Phulbani Odia
                      - Sundargadi Odia
                      - Kalahandia Odia
                    - Adivasi Oriya / Adivasi Odia
                    - Bodo Parja / Jharia
                    - Sambalpuri / Western Odia
                    - Reli / Relli
                    - Kupia
            - Halbic
              - Halbi
              - Bhunjia
              - Bhatri
              - Kamar
              - Mirgan / Panika
              - Nahari
          - Southern Indo-Aryan
            - Maharashtri Prakrit (extinct)
              - Marathi-Konkani
                - Marathic
                  - Andh
                  - Berar-Deccan
                  - Kadodi
                  - Katkari
                  - Marathi
                    - Berar-Deccan?
                    - Judeo-Marathi
                    - Mumbai
                    - Thakri
                    - Thanjavur Marathi
                    - Varhadi
                  - Phudagi
                  - Varli
                - Konkanic
                  - Canarese Konkani
                  - Konkani
                  - Maharashtri Konkani
                    - Agri
                  - Malvani
                  - Nawayathi
          - Insular Indo-Aryan
            - Sinhala-Maldivian
              - Elu (extinct)
                - Sinhala
                  - Rodiya
                - Old Dhivehi
                  - Maldivian
                    - Huvadhu
  - Unclassified
    - Chinali-Lahul
      - Chinali
      - Lahul Lohar
    - Sheikhgal
    - Bazigar

== Unclassified Indo-European languages (all extinct) ==
Indo-European languages whose relationship to other languages in the family is unclear

- Albanoid?
  - Dardanian
  - Illyrian
  - Messapic
- Ancient Belgian
- Asinean / Osian / Issedonian / Wusun?
  - Asinean / Osian
  - Issedonian
  - Wusun
- Brygian-Phrygian-Mygdonian?
  - Brygian-Phrygian
    - Brygian
    - Phrygian
  - Mygdonian
- Daco-Thracian
  - Dacian
  - Thracian
- Elymian
- Gelonian
- Gushiean-Yuezhian?
  - Gushiean
  - Yuezhian
- Liburnian
- Ligurian
- Lusitanian
- Moesian-Mysian-Paeonian-Mushkian?
  - Moesian-Mysian-Paeonian?
    - Moesian
    - Mysian
    - Paeonian
  - Mushkian
- Siculian
- Venetic

== Possible Indo-European languages (all extinct) ==
Unclassified languages that may have been Indo-European or members of other language families (?)

- Cypro-Minoan
- Eteocypriot
- Kaskian
- Lullubian
- Mannaean
- Minoan
  - Eteocretan
- North Picene
- Paleo-Corsican
- Paleo-Sardinian
- Philistine Indo-European
- Sicanian
- Tartessian
- Trojan

== See also ==
- List of Pidgins, Creoles, Mixed languages and Cants based on Indo-European languages
- Indo-Hittite
- Paleo-Balkan
- Daco-Thracian
- Graeco-Armenian
- Graeco-Aryan
- Graeco-Phrygian
- Thraco-Illyrian
- Italo-Celtic

== Notes ==
By ISO 639-3 code
Enter an ISO code to find the corresponding language article.
