= Vistulan dialect =

Dialect of Low Prussian

Vistulan
- Native to: Poland (formerly Germany)
- Region: Vistula region, West Prussia
- Ethnicity: Germans
- Language family: Indo-European: Germanic; West Germanic; North Sea Germanic; Low German; Northern Low German; Low Prussian; Vistulan

Language codes
- ISO 639-3: –

The Vistulan dialect (German: Dialekt des Weichselgebietes, lit. 'dialect of the Vistula region') was a dialect of Low Prussian, which belongs to Low German. The dialect was spoken in West Prussia (today in Poland) around Zarnowitzer See, Danzig and Graudenz. It had a border to Mundart der Weichselwerder. It is related to Nehrungisch.

== Geography ==
East Pomeranian had a border to Low Prussian according to Ē- and Ō-vowels running from Zarnowitzer See via Karthaus, West of Schöneck, to Preußisch-Stargard, to Bromberg and south of Vistula to East of Thorn. In West Prussian Kulmerland, East Pomeranian was spoken to Wąbrzeźno, Radzyń Chełmiński and Łasin.

It partly coincided with a transitional area of East Pomeranian and Low Prussian. The transitional area would end at about Chojnice (Konitz). Other places within this area included Bytów (Bütow), Lębork (Lauenburg), Bydgoszcz (Bromberg) and Toruń (Thorn). Within Low German in West Prussia, there was a major bundle of isoglosses in roughly the line Brodnica-Gardeja-Nowe and continuing somewhere between Kościerzyna and Chojnice.

The border of difference between a differentiation of nominative/accusative versus dative forms among strong masculine and neutral plurals ran from Lake Gardno (Garder See) to Kościerzyna (Berent) to Kartuzy (Karthaus) via Skarszewy (Schöneck) to Świecie (Schwetz). The Eastern border of the dialect area having gerunds mainly coincided with the Western border of realization of Middle Low German i and u as e respectively o. The border of realization of Middle Low German i and u as e respectively o apart from before Low German nt, ng nk and g for example op ran from Łebsko Lake (Lebasee), West of Lębork (Lauenburg)-Bytów (Bütow)-Kruschinsee-West of Starogard Gdański (Preußisch Stargard)-South and West of Vistula river. There was gutturalization of -nd- to voiced velar nasal east of the border Wicko (lake)-East of Sławno-East of Polanów-North, East and South of Miastko-Biały Bór-North and East of Czarne-Człuchów-West and South of Debrzno-Kamień Krajeński-North and East of Sępólno Krajeńskie- North of Czersk-West of Nowe.

== Phonology ==
Left of Vistula river ben and sestər was spoken for am and sister. In Danzig (Gdańsk), it had High German a as ǫ before l in words such as ǫl for High German alt and hǫle for High German halten. Another typical example is mǫn for High German Mann. The dialect of Danzig also has mǭke for High German machen, nǭˠel for High German Nagel, šlǭˠen for High German schlagen inter alia. It had a and ä in cases such as nat and nät for High German Netz. It had ek ben I am for ek sī.

In Danzig in originally open syllables before k and x [ach-Laut], a became ɔ:.

In Vistula Delta, the palatal plosive was usually back, which is closer to the Chortitza form; the palatal plosive in some regions to the west of the Vistula River had a front variant which is closer to the Molotschna-Plautdietsch form.

s, z and comparable sounds were quite special near upper Drewenz river, the Southwestern corner of East Prussia, the extreme Southeast of Warmia, in the area around Stuhm, South of Marienburg, in some villages near Dirschau and another area. This was the Old Prussian-Polish border area. Danzig and Heubude changed for a in originally open syllables to a long o with a cedilla.

== History ==
Numerous words in the Danzig area were from Dutch, in particular nautical and commercial vocabulary. Towards the end of the 18th century, the language spoken at home in long-established merchant families in Danzig was still Low German, this changed. Use in Danzig has since then been restricted to workers and small artisans. It was barely understood in privileged circles, but best by those who had the opportunity to hear it with their subordinates every day. In the countryside, Low German was still spoken by the landowners, if they preserved the rural way of life. In the second half of the 19th century, Low German had a considerable decline. Already in the age of the Teutonic Order there were Dutch colonists in Danzig. Low German with Dutch remnants was often still spoken in Danzig by Mennonite families at home in the first half of the 19th century. In 1780 a German hymnbook was introduced, partly translated from Dutch. Until then, the Danzig congregation had used Dutch songbooks. Until the second half of the 18th century, Mennonite sermons were in Dutch. By 1586 there were Mennonite congregations in both Graudenz and Danzig.

There were numerous Mennonite congregations in West Prussia and East Prussia. Reimer distinguishes six West Prussian core groups according to families: The Flemish rural congregations, the Frisian rural congregations, the Frisian congregations in the upper Vistula lowlands, the Old Flemish congregations, the Flemish congregation of Danzig city area and the urban part of the Congregation of Elbing, the Frisian congregation of Danzig-Neugarten. The Flemish Mennonites originated from a group of religiously persecuted Mennonites who had fled from Flanders and other parts of present-day Belgium to the Netherlands, the country of origin of the Mennonites, around the middle of the 16th century. Here many settled, especially in Friesland, and formed independent congregations in the towns of Franeker, Harlingen, Dokkum and Leeuwarden, which agreed on nineteen common articles of faith in 1560 and formed the association Ordinance der vier Steden. Among the agreements of the Ordinance was that a preacher elected by the local congregation should also be recognised in the other congregations of the association and thus had permission to work in them as well. It was also decided that conflicts within a single congregation should be settled by all the preachers of the associated congregations. In addition, a centralised welfare service for the poor was envisaged. The Frisian Brotherhood of Mennonite Congregations, saw especially in these three points of the Flemish the autonomy of the local congregation, one of its basic principles, in danger. Despite many efforts on various sides, a split could not be prevented. The schismatic tendencies in both groups were reinforced by the different practices of faith and life, but also by the fact that leading Mennonite personalities joined one or the other faction. For example, Leenaert Bouwens (1515-1582) sided with the Frisians, whereas Dirk Philips (1504-1568) on the side of the Flemish. In June 1567, the two parties separated and imposed a church ban on the other grouping. This split did not only affect Dutch Mennonitism, but continued in all Mennonite settlement areas. The attributes Flemish and Frisian had long ceased to be geographical designations of origin; they became intra-Mennonite denominational names. The Old Flemish Mennonites were a denomination originating from a split from the so-called Flemish Mennonites around 1586 in Franeker. The derisive name Huiskoopers, by which the Old Flemish were also referred to, originated from a controversial house purchase made by Thomas Bintgens, an elder of the Flemish Mennonite Church, had made and which led to a split among its members. The external cause was a house purchase that Thomas Bintgens (also spelled Byntgens or Bijntgens), elder of the Old Flemish Parish in Franeker, had made for 700 guilders, but had the seller issue him with a receipt for 800 guilders. Jacob Keest, Joos Jans and Jakob Berends, also members of the municipal council, condemned this behaviour as a serious breach of the duty to truth. Bintgens tried to justify himself; he had only wanted to prevent later bids on the house with the consent of the seller. He then told the council that he was sorry about the whole thing and that he would rather pay for the house twice than harm anyone. The opposing side did not accept these arguments, but additionally accused Bintgen of having bought the property from an indebted drunkard and profligate. He should have spent at least part of the purchase price to pay off the seller's creditors. Behind the specific accusations were probably also differences of opinion with regard to the church ban. Keest and his faction criticised Bintgens' strictness in this context. The dispute not only divided the local congregation; delegates from surrounding Flemish congregations tried to settle the disputes, but carried the conflict into their congregations. The factions were initially referred to by the names of their representatives (Thomas Bintgens volk; Jakob Keest volk) and later as Huiskoopers and Contra-huiskoopers. The name Contra-Huiskoopers soon fell into oblivion. The followers of Keest were then the Sachten (= gentle, mild) Flemish or simply the Flemish in contrast to the stricter Old Flemish around Bintgens. The group around Bintgens became the nucleus of the Old Flemish Mennonites, which subsequently spread to the Netherlands, East Frisia, West and East Prussia. Despite the designation Old Flemish Mennonites, many of them were Hollanders. Furthermore, many were not Dutch-speaking. The Groningen Old Flemish split from the Flemish Mennonites in about 1630 because of their tendency to merge with other Mennonite groups. They soon founded the international Old Flemish Mennonite association Groninger Doopsgezinde Sociëteit with headquarters in Groningen. The internationally present Danzig Old Flemish, a grouping distinct from the Groningen Old Flemish, was given the designation Huiskoopers, which was no longer applied to the Groningen Old Flemish. Possibly in 1665, the Ukowallists denomination founded by Uko Walles merged with the Groningen Old Flemish. The term Ukowallists was thereafter also applied to the Old Flemish. In contrast to other Mennonite denominations, the Old Flemish practised a stricter form of church bans; they also stood for a stricter form of church orders and placed value on a simple way of life. Between the second half of the 18th century and the first decades of the 19th century, the split was largely reversed in the aforementioned regions. The Old Flemish integrated into Mennonitism in general, Groningen Old Flemish Sociëteit having been dissolved in 1815. There were several languages spoken by Old Flemish Mennonites and several dialects of each. Within the coastal area from Gdańsk to Elbląg, the denomination Flemish Mennonites once predominated among the Mennonites, whereas in Vistula valley the denomination Frisian Mennonites did. There were Frisian Mennonites in Rudniki, Kwidzyn County (Rudnerweide), Sporowo (Sparrau), Pastwa (Pastwa), Kowalewo Pomorskie (Schönsee), Barcice, Pomeranian Voivodeship (Tragheimerweide) and Mała Nieszawka (Obernessau). There were congregations of Frisian Mennonites in Gdańsk, Mątawy, Kowalewo Pomorskie and Barcice, Lesser Poland Voivodeship. There was a congregation of Flemish Mennonites in Dziewięć Włók. Gdańsk and Przechówko had an Old Flemish congregation each. In 1808, the Gdansk Old Flemish Mennonite congregation merged with the Gdansk Old Frisian Mennonite congregation. The Old Flemish parish of Stogi (Gdańsk) (Heubuden) had a branch in Pastwa, West Prussia, part of the parish in Jerczewo. In West Prussia there was also the Old Flemish parish of Jeziorki, Świecie County (Kleinsee). Among the most important surnames of Old Flemish Mennonites in Przechówko and Jeziorki and their descendants are, including variants, Becker, Buller, Foth/Voth, Janz, Jansen, Kryckert/Kroeker, Köhn, Nachtigall, Onrouw/Unruh/Unrau, Pankratz, Ratzlaff, Richert, Schellenberg, Sperling, Wedel. Some members of the Old Flemish Mennonite congregation of Przechówko moved to Błotnica, Lubusz Voivodeship (Brenkenhoffswalde) and Głęboczek (Franztal), now in Poland, where they lived until 1945. Przechówko was situated in a transitional area between the East Pomeranian dialect and Low Prussian. The switch from Dutch to High German as language of worship was earlier among Frisian Mennonites, which probably was due to High German refugees in the same area. In urban congregations, the change of language of worship from Dutch to High German was later, which possibly was caused by contact to Dutch congregations.

=== Diaspora ===
Old Flemish Mennonites moved as far as Ukraine (then part of Southern Russia). Some of the Flemish colonists of Chortitza Colony were from the Danzig area. In general, the Mennonites migrated from the areas mentioned in the introduction to Chortitza Colony or Molotschna Colony in Ukraine. Mennonites settled in West Prussia mostly in the three local areas of Nehrung (on the Baltic Sea), Werder (islands in the Vistula delta) and Niederung (south of the Werder), where they adopted the respective local Low German dialect as their everyday language. The dialect spoken on the Nehrung (spit) has many features of the dialect of Chortitza; and the dialect spoken in the Werder (islands of vistula river) shows strong similarity with the dialect of Molotschna. Firmenich divided the dialects of the left bank of the Molotschna into: 1. Friesisch-Flamänd'sch, 2. Gröning-Holstein'sch, which is spoken mainly in Alexanderwohl, 3. the significant deviation -spoken in Waldheim and Liebenau- of the latter dialect, 4. the dialect of Gnadenfeld, 5. the dialect of Schardau and 6. the dialect of Hutterthal. He summarises the Molotschna and the Frisian dialect as Friesisch-Flamändisch. In Liebenau most people spoke the Molotschna dialect and in Schardau most people spoke the Frisian dialect. Mariupol Prussians and speakers in Chortitza had köoke for Molotschna kuoke and Kronsweide kōke. Molotschna differed from those varieties by showing blao, grao and klao for their bläw, gräw and kläw. Low German of Volhynia differed much more than those varieties from each other. One of three main groupings of Plautdietsch had its origin in the estate of a nobleman named Przechowka near Świecie in Poland. It was not part of Molotschna-Plautdietsch, though spoken in Waldheim, Gnadenfeld and Alexanderwohl. Waldheim on Molotschna was founded by Mennonites from the Ostrog area. Gnadenfeld, Waldheim and Alexanderwohl were Groningen Old Flemish settlements on Molotschna in Ukraine and traced their origin from Przechówko. The Waldheim-Gnadenfeld dialect was one of three varieties of Low German of the Mennonites in Molotschna. This form of Low German differs more from that of the Molotschna or Chortitza than they do from each other. The dialect was divided into Alexanderwohl dialect, Waldheim dialect and Gnadenfeld dialect. In Hierschau in the Molotschna Colony in Ukraine, most of the inhabitants were Old Flemish from Brenkenhofswalde-Franztal. Gnadenfeld congregation became the center of a revival movement resulting in the founding of the Mennonite Brethren Church in 1860. One of the differences between Waldheim-Gnadenfeld dialect and Chortitza-Plautdietsch and Molotschna-Plautdietsch was the formation of the plural by endings, twalf for twelve instead of twölf as well as something comparable to gaut for good instead of goot. The western part of East Frisian Low Saxon - as distinct to the eastern part of East Frisian Low Saxon - had the formation of the plural through endings instead of through umlaut, twalf instead of twölf for twelve and gaut instead of goot for good. Speakers from Gnadenfeld have been reported to use the allophone [oː] in free variation with [ɔa] for pre-velar *ɔa (*œa) and allophone [əәʊ] in free variation with [oa] for pre-velar *oa (*øa). This is otherwise unknown in the Plautdietsch of other Mennonites. These very distinctive linguistic features are even noticeable in Kansas nowadays. In the Mennonite settlement Am Trakt founded in the 1850s in Russia, the settlers came directly from Prussia and founded the colony. An application for emigration on the part of two people from Lubieszewo (Ladekopp) and Żuławki (Fürstenwerder) was effected for numerous people. In each of the two places there had been a congregation of Old Flemish Mennonites. Becker was also a name in Gnadenfeld, Waldheim and Alexanderwohl. Most of the residents of Alexanderwohl moved to the following areas: Marion County, Kansas Harvey County and McPherson County, Kansas. From Przechovka some moved to Brenkenhoffswalde and Franztal, in what is today Poland, where they used to live until 1945. Mennonites who were descendants of Groningen Old Flemish from the Netherlands moved from Poland to near Ostrog in Russia. Polish Mennonites in the southern Kulmerland in Poland near Grudziądz (Graudenz) and Chełmno (Culm) migrated to Volhynia. They spoke the local variety of their area, taking at further, also to Kansas. In 1821, they were near Ostrog in Volhynia (Ukraine) in two villages, Karolswalde and Antonovka, with 38 families. That is why they were called Ostrogers. The first and leading inhabited village was Karolswalde, located four miles south of Ostrog. In 1828, the neighbouring village of Karolsberge was settled. In 1857, the settled villages also included Jadvinin and Dossidorf. In 1874 Fürstendorf, Gnadenthal and Waldheim were added, but Dossidorf was not mentioned. Another village associated with the group was Fürstenthal. Nearly the entire group migrated to Canton and Pawnee Rock, Kansas, and Avon, South Dakota, in 1874. Pawnee Rock, Kansas was founded in 1875 by Mennonite immigrants originating from Karolswalde. Most of the 175 inhabitants of 1956 were Mennonites of Polish and Russian Mennonite descent, and members of the New Hopedale Mennonite Church (General Conference Mennonite Church). The members of the Emmanuel Mennonite Church (General Conference Mennonite) were of Karolswalde background, Karolswalde being settled by Mennonites from Graudenz, Culm, and Thorn areas. Prussian Mennonites from Russia began moving to Kansas in 1876. A larger group of them consisted of people from Alexanderwohl. John Holdeman founded the Mennonite Church of God in Christ in 1859, initially with few members, some of whom converted from the Amish. After 1878, immigrant Mennonites from Prussia, who had a different ethnic background from the previous members, were attracted to this church. Most of them were frustrated, landless Ostrogers who soon became the majority. Some, however, were spiritually troubled Mennonites from the Kleine Gemeinde of Molotschna who had experienced traumatic internal divisions. About 45-50 percent of Mennonite Church of God in Christ members are from the McPherson County group with names like Koehn, Schmidt, Unruh, Jantz, Becker, Nightengale, Wedel, Ratzlaff, and Jantzen/Johnson. About 25-30 per cent have a background from the Canadian province of Manitoba with names such as Toews, Penner, Friesen, Giesbrecht, Loewen, Isaac, Wiebe and Reimer. Prussian Mennonites founded Emmaus Mennonite Church, First Mennonite Church of Newton, and Zion Mennonite Church in Elbing. Members of First Mennonite Church (Newton, Kansas) were from Heubuden (Stogi). Zion Mennonite Church (Elbing, Kansas, USA) had members who came from Stogi (Heubuden) and Lubieszowo (Ladekopp). The Mennonite Church USA has First Mennonite Church of Newton and Zion Mennonite Church in Elbing, but not Emmaus Mennonite Church or any other church in Whitewater in its directory. These are not the only churches of Mennonite Church USA in the area. Alexanderwohl Mennonite Church is a Low German Mennonite Church, in Goessel, Kansas, US. In Alexandertal, also called the Mennonite settlement of Alt-Samara in Russia, there were Mennonites from West Prussia who came from the area of the Great Werder east of Gdansk and from the Graudenz lowlands further upstream of the Vistula.

== Hüttenpommersch ==
The area of Hüttenpommersch is not always included in its entirety within Low Prussian. It was spoken of both sides of the border of Free City of Danzig. It was spoken around Przywidz (Mariensee). it had a transitional area to Low Prussian. Within its area, Kashubian was spoken. Palatal k becomes an affricate tx. G of High German is realized as j.

== See also ==
- Danzig German

== Bibliography ==
- Siemens, Heinrich (2012). Plautdietsch: Grammatik, Geschichte, Perspektiven (in German). Bonn: Tweeback Verlag. ISBN 9783981197853.
