= Werdersch =

Low Prussian dialect

- Native to: Poland, Russia (formerly Germany)
- Region: Vistula river islands
- Ethnicity: Germans
- Language family: Indo-European: Germanic; West Germanic; North Sea Germanic; Low German; East Low German; Low Prussian; Werdersch
- Dialects: Molotschna-Plautdietsch

Language codes
- ISO 639-3: –

Werdersch (German: Werdersch, Mundart der Weichselwerder) is a subdialect of Low Prussian, which itself is a subdialect of Low German. This dialect is spoken in Poland and was spoken in the former province of West Prussia. Werdersch is closely related to Nehrungisch and Plautdietsch.

Its name derives from the Weichselwerder (lit. 'Vistula River islands'), which are Żuławy Gdańskie (between Wisła Gdańska and Gdańskie Wyżyny) and Żuławy Malborskie (German: Großes Werder; between Vistula, Szkarpawa, Vistula Lagoon, and Nogat).

It also was spoken West of Vistula river.

The dialect spoken in the Werder at that time is very similar to the dialect of Molotschna. The distinctive features of Molotschna-Plautdietsch as opposed to Chortitza-Plautdietsch are given at Plautdietsch#Varieties. Its eastern border was to Oberländisch, a High Prussian variety.

== History ==
Werdersch developed after Dutch-speaking immigrants from the Netherlands moved in the sixteenth century to the region where Werdersch is spoken. Żuławy Malborskie was divided linguistically into the respective area of Werderisch and Niederungisch, the former related to Molotschna-Plautdietsch, the latter related to Chortitza-Plautdietsch being part of Nehrungisch. Half of the immigrants were Mennonites, the other half were Protestants. Though not all were from Holland (some were German colonists), they were all referred to as Hollanders. Many of the Mennonites spoke Low German. The early Anabaptists from the province of Friesland spoke Frisian. Groups of Flemish Mennonites and Frisian Mennonites were early arrivals; they later also continued on to Russia. The difference between these two groups was religious rather than ethnic. The Frisian parish of Orłowskie Pole (Orlofferfelde) merged with the Old Flemish parish of Lubieszewo (Ladekopp). The Old Flemish parish of Großes Werder later became the four parishes of Różewo (Rosenort), Cyganek (Nowy Dwór Gdański) (Tiegenhagen), Lubieszewo (Ladekopp) and Żuławki (Fürstenwerder). Elbląg (Elbing) had an Old Flemish Congregation. The Old Flemish parish of Großes Werder gave rise to the Frisian parish of Barcice (Tragheimerweide), also known as the Waterlander parish. Catherine the Great called some of these Mennonite immigrants further east to Russia. Most of the founders of the Molotschna Colony and the Chortitza Colony were Flemish Mennonites who spoke Werdersch. A variety in Molotschna not being part of Molotschna-Plautdietsch was the one of Waldheim, Gnadenfeld and Alexanderwohl originating from an area near Świecie in Poland. Both of these colonies were in Russia (now Zaporizhzhia Oblast, Ukraine), and were the origin of much of the modern-day Russian Mennonite diaspora. Orloff Mennonite Church in Molotschna Mennonite Settlement, Zaporizhia Oblast, Ukraine was the oldest congregation in the settlement. It was called Orloff-Halbstadt congregation, after 1877 as Orloff-Halbstadt-Neukirch congregation, until 1895, when Halbstadt also became independent. Thereafter it was called the Orloff-Neukirch congregation. Most residents of the following villages of the settlement were members of this congregation: Orloff, Tiege, Blumenort, Rosenort, Neukirch, Friedensruh, Tiegerweide, Frisian Mennonites in the early days of Chortitza Colony were in the minority in this mainly Frisian Mennonite colony, living in Kronsweide, Schöngarten, Kronsgarten and Einlage, strictly separate from the Flemish Mennonites. The Grosse Gemeinde was the Flemish mother church of the Molotschna, known as the Ohrloff-Petershagen-Halbstadt Church. Kleine Gemeinde was founded later. Grosse Gemeinde was renamed to Lichtenau-Petershagen Mennonite Church. Evangelische Mennoniten-Gemeinden was a group of congregations split from Mennonite Brethren. Molotschnaer Evangelische Mennonitenbrüderschaft and the congregation in Altonau were the most important congregations of the Evangelische Mennoniten-Gemeinden. It remained a grouping in Paraguay. In the American places Henderson, Nebraska, and Mountain Lake, Minnesota, related congregations were founded which later became known as the Evangelical Mennonite Brethren. In 1926 the total membership (including children) of the combined Mennonite congregations in the Molotschna was 15,036, of the Mennonite Brethren 2,501, and the Evangelical Mennonite Brethren 810, a total of 17,347. Schönsee Mennonite Church was a daughter of Lichtenau-Petershagen Mennonite Church, most residents of Liebenau being members thereof. Kirchliche Mennoniten was a term for those Mennonites without further designation such as Mennonite Brethren. Krimmer Mennonite Brethren in Ukraine had no connection to Mennonite Brethren. The so-called Kronsweide dialect also was spoken as the minority dialect in Chortzitza. Kronsweide was a place among the Chortitza Frisian group. A situation of majority and minority was the case in Molotschna Colony, where the Frisian Mennonites settled in Rudnerweide, consisting of seven villages. Krimmer Mennonite Brethren were a church of people from Molotschna and related to Kleine Gemeinde founded on Crimea. Its first congregation in the United States was at Gnadenau, Kansas. Kleine Gemeinde Mennonites are present in Belize and Tamaulipas inter alia.

In Alexandertal, also called the Mennonite settlement of Alt-Samara in Russia, there were Mennonites from West Prussia who came from the area of the Great Werder east of Gdansk and from the Graudenz lowlands further upstream of the Vistula. Most of the 19th-century Mennonite immigrants to the United States from Russia, Prussia or Poland joined the General Conference Mennonite Church. The descendants of the Mennonites of Dutch origin who came via Prussia in 1874 in 1955 largely constituted the membership of 6 General Conference Mennonite congregations. Among them there were churches at Beatrice, Nebraska, and Newton and Whitewater, Kansas.

The descendants of the Dutch who came via Prussia and South Russia, arriving in America in 1874 ff., constituted the major part of 70 congregations. This was the largest cultural group in the General Conference. Those congregations were scattered all over the West. Many were located in Kansas, Minnesota, and Canada. Alexanderwohl congregation at Goessel, and Hoffnungsau congregation at Inman, Kansas, were two of the original settlements in the United States, from which came a number of younger congregations.

The descendants of the Dutch who came via Prussia and Polish Russia in 1874 now largely constituted the membership of 11 congregations. Among them were Gnadenberg at Elbing, Johannesthal at Hillsboro, and churches at Canton and Pawnee Rock, Kansas, and Meno, Oklahoma. the first members of the Zion Mennonite Church (General Conference Mennonite) here, organized in 1883, came from the area near Elbing, West Prussia. The Mennonites settling in Hillsborough originated from Molotschna settlement, Russia (General Conference, Mennonite Brethren, and Krimmer Mennonite Brethren groups), from Poland (Johannestal), and a few from Prussia (Brudertal). Among the Rosenorter Mennonites were direct immigrants from Nowy Dwór Gdański (Tiegenhof) in Poland.

== Phonology ==
Werdersch has alveolar /r/, like Eastern Low Prussian. Werdersch has, at least in some words, long /u/ as short /u/ and long /i/ as short /i/. In Heubuden, in originally open syllables before k and x [ach-Laut], a became ɔ:.

Werdersch has shortened u before gutturals. It has dorx for High German durch, English through.

Werdersch had a in the closed syllable before l as o.

=== List of isoglosses within Großes Marienburger Werder (Żuławy Malborskie) ===
- /a/ mostly as /au/
- /n/-loss in kannst
- Long /o/ is shortened before l+dental; umlaut lacks in words such as kaufen
- Final -n
- /l/-loss in willst and sollst
- Loss of /n/ in an-, in- un- before fricatives, /r, l, m, n and g.
- büten, dün, glüpen etc. versus buten, dun, glupen etc.
- haiwen, blaif etc. versus hauen, blau etc.
- Shortening of /î/ to /i/ before velars
- Shortening of /û/ to /u/ before velars
- /i, e and ar/ becoming /e, a and or/ respectively

=== Molotschna-Plautdietsch ===
Molotschna-Plautdietsch is descended from Werdersch. In originally closed syllables (excluding before original /r/, /ld/ and /lp/), /e/ is given as front vowel /a/. In contrast to Nehrungisch and Chortitza-Plautdietsch, it and Molotschna-Plautdietsch have High German /au/ as /au/, and no shortened /u/ before /p/.

In less conservative varieties, the nucleus of words such as heet has begun to fall and further dissimilate itself from its off-glide. "American speakers from the earlier Midwestern settlements sometimes have a raised allophone" of words, such as Äkj: [e̝]. Molotschna speakers in the USA from the original late 1800s settlements often lack an off-glide in some OA forms, but do have off-glides in other OA forms (e.g. Oabeid 'work' [ɔɐbaid] vs Foagel 'fowl' [foːɣl], koake 'to cook' [koːke], and Büak 'book' [boːk]). "Molotschna speakers from Mexico with the traditional Molotschna Dialect OA form retain the original off-glide in words like Foagel 'fowl' [foɐɣl]."

Molotschna-Plautdietsch has palatalization given as c and ɟ, which probably used to exist in West Prussia as well. Orenburg colony has palatalization like in Molotschna Colony [c] [ɟ].

== Grammar ==
Werdersch has the preterite forms kam and nam. Like Mundart des Ostgebiets, it has du motst meaning you have to.

=== Molotschna-Plautdietsch ===
Molotschna-Plautdietsch uses dative case, but not accusative case. Dative has spread to neighbouring Menno Colony. In Latin America, dative forms mostly are used in Plautdietsch. Speakers from Fernheim use most consistently dative for accusative, though having better knowledge of Standard German than other Latin American speakers of Plautdietsch. Molotschna-Plautdietsch has ahn for them. Molotschna-Plautdietsch has the formal address using the pronoun of the third person. Molotschna-Plautdietsch has infinitive and plural, both ending with /-ə/. For verbs with two preterite forms, Molotschna-Plautdietsch mostly uses the velar form with /au/. It has the velar stem vowel of Dutch and a limited number of palatal preterite forms. Molotschna-Plautdietsch has habe for the infinitive have.

== Mennonite settlements, congregations and denominations with a Molotschna-Plautdietsch connection ==
=== In Europe ===
The congregations of Flemish Mennonites in the area of the Weichselwerder were Ellerwald, Fürstenwerder, Heubuden, Ladekopp, Rosenort, and Tiegenhagen. Orlofferfelde and Thiensdorf had a congregation of Frisian Mennonites.

There were daughter settlements of Molotschna in Ukraine.

=== In Russia ===
Molotschna-Plautdietsch dominates the Plautdietsch of those having remained in Russia late.

In Russia there were Molotschna daughter colonies, like Neu-Samara and Auli Ata in Turkestan Province and Davlekanovo in Ufa Province.

Orenburg Colony in Russia was mainly settled from Molotschna and less from Chortitza. Plautdietsch in Slavgorod and Znamenka in general showed more features of Molotschna-Plautdietsch than of Chortzitza-Plautdietsch, though having settled by both Molotschna and Chortzitza settlers.

Most prevailing phonological features within Altai are related to Molotschna. Originally (primary) features of the Chortitza variety, bryːt (vs. Molotschna bruːt) 'bride' and hy:s (vs. hu:s 'house') or the palatalised k in ät' (Molotschna äk) 'I' and t'ɪn'ɐ (Molotschna kin'ɐ) 'children', became predominant features in Altai.

Near Pavlodar, Omsk and Minussinsk, there were mixed Molotschna-Chortitza colonies.

=== In North America ===
Mennonite migrants to the United States in the 19th century mainly originated from the Molotschna Colony and settled in the Midwestern US. This group expanded into the Central Valley of California, but never formed a large Mennonite community there. In 1874, Mennonites from the Molotschna region settled around Wichita, Kansas. These settlers originated from the Krimmer Mennonite Brethren, Alexanderwohl, so-called Prussian Mennonites, and Volhynia Mennonites. "The Alexanderwohl, Mennonite Brethren, and General Conference Mennonites are all moderate Molotschna denominations in central Kansas."

"Within the United States, Molotschna descendants founded several universities". Mennonites founded Fresno Pacific University, as well as Bethel College and Tabor College in Kansas.

Rosenorter Gemeinde, a partly Plautdietsch-speaking community in Canada mainly stemmed from the immigration of adherents from Prussia, Ukraine, and the USA.

In Manitoba, Canada, the East Reserve had a minority of its Mennonites originating from Molotschna. In the 1940s, about 800 Mennonites from the West Reserve immigrated to northern Mexico, most of whom were Canadian Sommerfelder or Kleine Gemeinde Mennonites; thus, Molotschna-Plautdietsch is now spoken in Mexico. The Plautdietsch spoken in Mexico, Bolivia, and Texas differs from that spoken farther north. In western Texas, there are approximately 6,000 speakers of Plautdietsch. Many speakers of Plautdietsch show main features of both Molotschna-Plautdietsch and Chortitza-Plautdietsch. Mennonites of "Central Kansas, California, Nebraska and Oklahoma often maintain ties". In the 20th century, Canadian Molotschna Mennonites arrived in Mexico, and founded the Jagüeyes Colonies in Mexico.

Phonological differences exist between the Plautdietsch of Catholics and Mennonites in Canada's Saskatchewan Valley. These include [iəә] for the phoneme /ea/ wea (was) and Pead (horses) for Mennonite speakers; Catholic speakers use [eəә], traced to Ukraine. Lexical differences also exist. They have [eɐ(r)] and [oˑ] for eea and oo. However, the distinct features of Plautdietsch of Catholics do not sum up to a separate variety or at least cluster of varieties (as opposed to clustering concerning specific features). The Catholic group shares several other phonological features with some Mennonite speakers, including the realization of /u/ as [u] (rather than [y]) and the absence of pre-velar fronting and any metathesis in final -re(n). They have a categorical use of the aforementioned -e. Furthermore, the monophthongal realizations of ee as [eˑ] and oo as [oˑ], as well as their realization of ea as [eəә] is idiosyncratic. The non-distinctive features of Plautdietsch of Catholics include [e] for example in the word kjänne(n), realization of /ɔa/ before velars, with non-fronted realizations (e.g., [oəә], [oˑ]), [ɲ] between vowels,[aʊj] and realization of au~ee in the word for gave (pl.) as <au>. It has kjenne(n) including [ɛ] instead of kjänne(n) with [e]. Plautdietsch of Catholics has a non-fronted realization of oa before velars.

=== In South America ===
In Paraguay, Molotschna-Plautdietsch is spoken in Neuland Colony and Fernheim Colony. Some residents of Fernheim Colony and Tres Palmas Colony have Molotschna ancestry. Molotschna-Plautdietsch is the dominant Plautdietsch variety in Fernheim Colony. Friesland Colony was founded by people moving from Fernheim Colony.

In Brazil, Santa Catarina and Rio Grande do Sul have residents of Molotschna origin. Molotschna-Plautdietsch is also spoken in Southern Brazil.

The denomination Flemish Mennonites was predominant in the Żuławy Malborskie, the denomination Frisian Mennonites in the Żuławy Elbląskie. Later groups of settlers had more predominant representation of Frisian Mennonites from more southerly (Werder) areas.

=== Modern Mennonite congregations ===
Evangelical Mennonite Conference is a denomination of Molotschna origin limited to Canada. More than half of its churches are in Manitoba province. Mennonite Brethren are a denomination originating from Molotschna. Mennonite Church USA has more members of Molotschna rather than of Chortitza origin.

== Bibliography ==
- Brandt, Carsten (1992). Sprache und Sprachgebrauch der Mennoniten in Mexiko (in German). Marburg: Elwert. p. 252.
- Burns, Roslyn (2016). New World Mennonite Low German: An Investigating of Changes in Progress (PhD). UC Berkeley. Archived from the original on 2021-05-16.
- Jähnig, Bernhard; Letkemann, Peter, eds. (1985). Danzig in acht Jahrhunderten (in German). Nicolaus-Copernicus-Verlag. p. 319.
- Klassen, John N., ed. (2007). Russlanddeutsche Freikirchen in der Bundesrepublik Deutschland (in German).
- Mitzka, Walther (1968). Kleine Schriften (in German). Walter de Gruyter & Co.
- Penner, Horst (1952). Weltweite Bruderschaft (in German). Karlsruhe: Heinrich Schneider. pp. 72, 75.
- Penner, Nikolai (2009). The High German of Russian Mennonites in Ontario (PDF) (Thesis). Waterloo, Ontario, Canada: University of Waterloo. Archived (PDF) from the original on 2021-08-31. [a doctor's thesis]
- Quiring, Jacob Walter (1924). Die Mundart von Chortitza in Süd-Rußland (PDF) (Thesis) (in German). Munich: Ludwig-Maximilians-Universität zu München. Archived (PDF) from the original on 2020-10-21.
- Quiring, Jacob (1928). Die Mundart von Chortitza in Süd-Russland (in German). Munich: Druckerei Studentenhaus München.
- Ruhnau, Kurt; Wolfram, Hans Egon (1943). Die Niederlande und der Deutsche Osten (in German). Berlin: Verlag Joh. Kasper & Co. Archived from the original on 2021-01-12.
- Siemens, Heinrich (2012). Plautdietsch: Grammatik, Geschichte, Perspektiven (in German). Bonn: Tweeback Verlag. ISBN 9783981197853.
- Wiens, Curt (1916). "Niederländischer Wortschatz in der Mundart der Weichselwerder" (PDF). Zeitschrift des Westpreussischeh Ceschichtsveheins (in German). No. 56. Danzig. Archived (PDF) from the original on 2020-09-20. [proper German would be: Zeitschrift des Westpreußischen Geschichtsvereins]
- Ziesemer, Walther (1924). Die ostpreußischen Mundarten (in German). Breslau: Ferdinand Hirt. pp. 128–129, 133.
