= Filino =

Filino (Russian: Филино) is the name of several rural localities in Russia:

- Filino, Kovrovsky District, Vladimir Oblast, a village in Klyazminskoye Rural Settlement of Kovrovsky District, Vladimir Oblast
- Filino, Sobinsky District, Vladimir Oblast, a village in Kurilovskoye Rural Settlement of Sobinsky District, Vladimir Oblast
- Filino, Kaduysky District, Vologda Oblast, a village in Nikolskoye Rural Settlement of Kaduysky District, Vologda Oblast
- Filino, Totemsky District, Vologda Oblast, a village in Tolshmenskoye Rural Settlement of Totemsky District, Vologda Oblast
