= Westkäslausch =

Low Prussian dialect of Poland

- Region: East Prussia
- Ethnicity: Germans
- Language family: Indo-European: Germanic; West Germanic; Ingvaeonic; Low German; East Low German; Low Prussian; Westkäslausch

Language codes
- ISO 639-3: –

Westkäslausch was a Low Prussian dialect spoken in East Prussia, Germany (now Poland). It has features of Eastphalian, Westphalian and East Pomeranian dialect.

== Geography ==
Westkäslausch used to have borders to Natangian, Mundart des Kürzungsgebiets and Breslausch (a High Prussian dialect). Westkäslausch was spoken in an area having Mehlsack as a kind of midpoint. Westkäslausch does not have a border to Ostkäslausch.

== Phonology ==
It has d between vowels as r. Diphthongization seen in Natangian is mostly also present in Westkäslausch.

== Grammar ==
It has the preterite forms kam and nam.
