= Eastphalian =

Eastphalian is:

- a resident of Eastphalia (Ostfalen), a historic region of Germany;
- the Eastphalian language (Ostfälisch) of Southern Low German.
