= Low Prussian dialect =

Dialect used in the East of Prussia

Low Prussian
- Region: West and East Prussia; Free City of Danzig
- Ethnicity: Germans (Prussian and Saxon subgroups)
- Language family: Indo-European: Germanic; West Germanic; North Sea Germanic; Low German; Northern Low German; Low Prussian
- Dialects: Plautdietsch

Language codes
- ISO 639-2: nds for Low German
- ISO 639-3: nds for Low German
- Glottolog: lowe1387

Low Prussian (German: Niederpreußisch), sometimes known simply as Prussian (Preußisch), is a moribund dialect of East Low German that developed in East Prussia. Low Prussian was spoken in East and West Prussia and Danzig up to 1945. In Danzig it formed the basis of the particular city dialect of Danzig German. It developed on a Baltic substrate through the influx of Dutch- and Low German-speaking immigrants. It supplanted Old Prussian, which became extinct in the early 18th century.

Simon Dach's poem Anke van Tharaw was written in Low Prussian.

== Classification ==
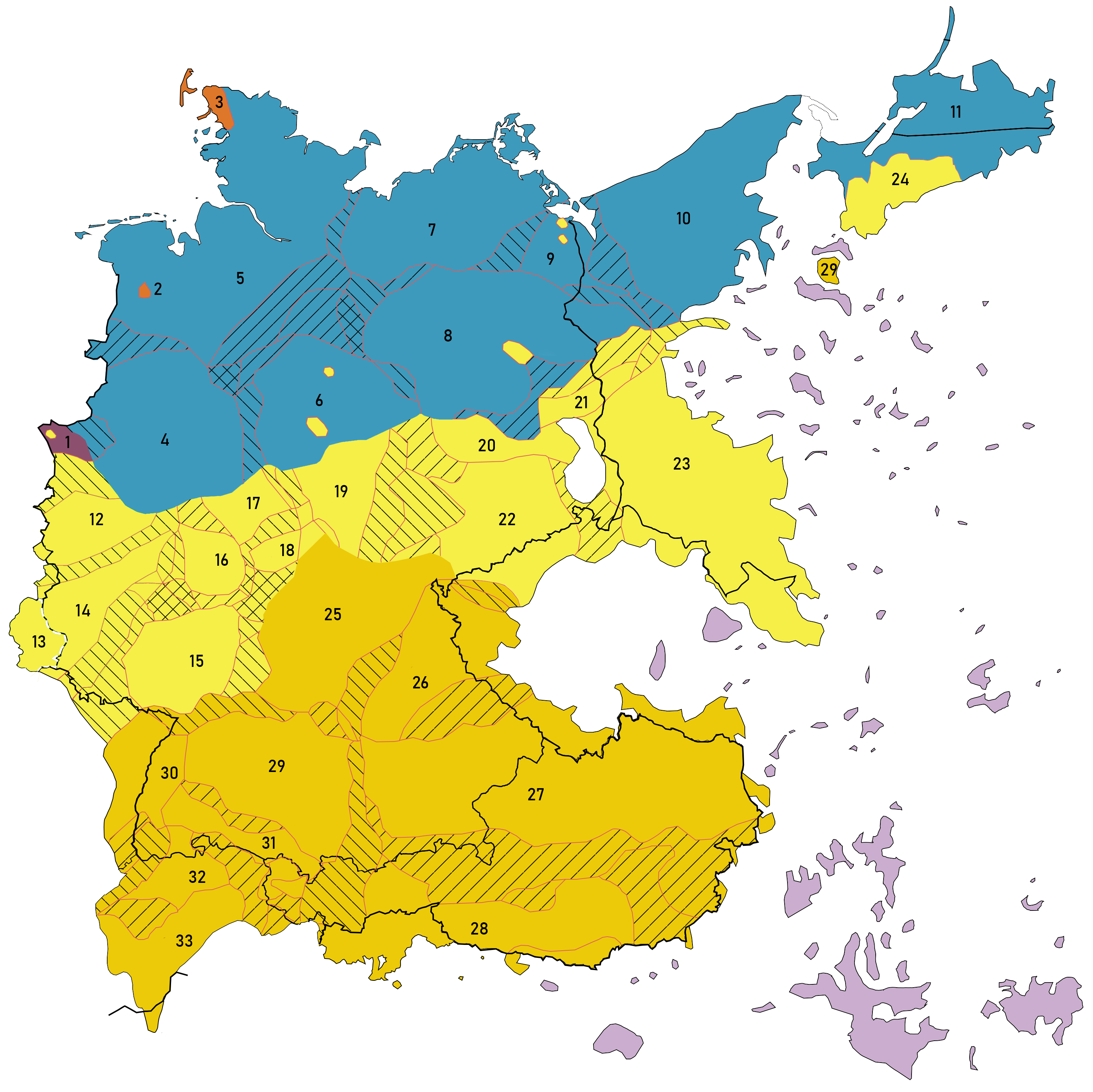
German dialects in 1910. The geographical spread of Low Prussian language (Niederpreußisch - 11) can be seen in the East

Low Prussian is a Low German dialect formerly spoken in Prussia. It is separated from its only adjacent German dialect, High Prussian, by the Benrath line and the Uerdingen line, the latter dialect being Central German. This was once one of the, if not the hardest linguistic border within the German dialects.

Plautdietsch is included within Low Prussian by some observers. Excluding Plautdietsch, Low Prussian can be considered moribund due to the evacuation and forced expulsion of Germans from East Prussia after World War II. Plautdietsch, however, has several thousand speakers throughout the world, most notably in South America, Canada and Germany.

== History ==
=== Before 1945 ===
In Danzig a German settlement (besides an existing Old Prussian-Kashubian settlement) was established in the 12th century. In the later Middle Ages, Middle Low Saxon in a Low Prussian form was the written and everyday language in Danzig. At the end of the 16th century, there was a switch to High German as a written language. This led to the formation of Danziger Missingsch, which shaped the everyday language in Danzig until 1945.

In Königsberg in 1924, the use of Low German as everyday language was restricted to the working class, and even among the working class Low German was more and more replaced by (a corrupted) High German.

=== Fate after 1945 ===
Almost all Low Prussian speakers were evacuated or expelled from Prussia after 1945. Since the expellees scattered throughout Western Germany the dialects are now moribund. Most of the Low Prussian speakers not expelled after World War II relocated from Poland to Western Germany in the 1970s and 1980s and from Russia in the 1990s as so-called late repatriates (Spätaussiedler). Today, the language is almost extinct, as its use is restricted to communication within the family and gatherings of expellees, where they are spoken out of nostalgia. In Poland, the language of the few non-displaced people was subjected to severe repression after 1945, which meant that the active use of the language was even lower than in Germany. In both countries, the High Prussian dialects were not transmitted to the next generation, therefore, few elderly speakers remain. The German minority in Poland, recognized since 1991, uses Standard German.

== Common Prussian features ==
It shares some features with High Prussian, differentiating it from neighbouring Low German dialects.

Those Borussisms are:

- Loss of /-n/ in infinitives (High Prussian mache for Standard German machen, "to make") – according to H. Frischbier this is only the case for Low German in East Prussia but not in West Prussia;
- retention of the prefix /ge-/ in the participe perfect passive (compare Mecklenburg Low German hei is lopen to Low Prussian he is jelopen);
- overly open pronunciation of /ɛ/ (schnall, Ack - schnell ("fast"), Eck ("corner"))
- delabialization (Kenig, Brieder, Fraide, Kraiter - König ("king"), Brüder ("brothers"), Freude ("friends"), Kräuter ("herbs"));
- nuscht instead of Standard German nichts ("nothing"); and
- preference for diminutive suffixes (de lewe Gottke, and High Prussian kommche, duche, Briefchedräger, - der liebe Gott ("dear God"), kommen ("to come"), du ("you"), Briefträger ("post man")) - and diminutives without umlaut (High Prussian Hundchen, Katzchen, Mutterchen - Hündchen ("small dog"), Kätzchen ("small cat/ kitten") Mütterchen ("mother/ elderly woman")).

== Vocabulary ==
According to one summary of Low German dialects, words very characteristic of Low Prussian are doa ('dor', there), joa ('jo', yes), goah ('goh', go) and noa ('nober', neighbor), which feature "oa" instead of the usual "o" or "a".

Words are often shortened, in a manner similar to that of the neighboring East Pomeranian dialect, giving beet (beten, little bit) and baakove ('bakåben', bake oven).

Low Prussian also has a number of words in common with Plautdietsch, such as Klemp (cow), Klopps (lump, ball of earth) and Tsoagel (tail).

Some other words are:

- Boffke - boy, lad
- dätsch - dumb
- Dubs - bum
- Gnaschel - little child
- jankere - yearn
- Kobbel - mare
- Pungel - pouch
- schabbere - talk
- Schischke - pine-cone
- Schucke - potato(es)

== Dialects ==
- Elbingian (lit. High German: Elbingisch, Höhenmundart, Höhenplatt, Mundart der Elbinger Höhe lit.: dialect of the Elbingian High)), around Elbing (Elbląg)
- Vistulan (Dialekt des Weichselgebietes, Weichselmundart or Weichselplatt), around Danzig (Gdańsk)
- Werdersch (Mundart der Weichselwerder, Werdermundart, Werderplatt or Werder(i)sch)
- Nehrungisch (Nehrungsmundart, Nehrungsplatt), around the Vistula Lagoon, from Narmeln (which is the most-eastern location) to Krakau (not including Heubude-Danzig and Neutief)
- Kürzungsgebietsmundart (Mundart des Kürzungsgebiet(e)s), around Braunsberg (Braniewo) and Frauenburg
- Westkäslausch, around Mehlsack (Pieniężno)
- Ostkäslausch, around Rößel (Reszel)
- Natangian (Natangisch or Natangisch-Bartisch), around Bartenstein (Bartoszyce)
- Samlandic (Samländisch), around Pillau (Baltiysk), Königsberg (Kaliningrad), as well as close to Labiau (Polessk) and close to Wehlau (Znamensk)
  - Westsamländisch, including Neutief
  - Ostsamländisch
- Eastern Low Prussian (Mundart des Ostgebiet(e)s), around Insterburg (Chernyakhovsk), Memel (Klaipėda),

Węgorzewo and Tilsit (Sovetsk)

== Low and Old Prussian ==
Low Prussian had patalization of /g/, /k/, which Latvian had since its contact to Low German.

After the assimilation of the Old Prussians, many Old Prussian words were preserved in the Low Prussian dialect.

Low Prussian	Old Prussian	Latvian	Lithuanian	Standard German	English
Kaddig	kadegis	kadiķis	kadagys	Wacholder	juniper
Kurp	kurpe, -i	kurpe	kurpė	Schuh	shoe
Kujel	cuylis	cūka, mežacūka, kuilis	kuilys, šernas	Wildschwein	boar
Margell, Marjell	merga [virgin]	meitene, meiča	merga, mergelė, mergaitė	Magd, Mädchen, Mädel	maiden, girl
Pawirpen	(from powīrps [free])	algādzis, strādnieks	padienis	Losmann	freelancer
Zuris	suris	siers	sūris	Käse	cheese

== Low Prussian and Lithuanian ==
In addition to the words of Old Prussian origin, another source of Baltic loans was Lithuanian. After the migration of Lithuanians in the 15th century, many Lithuanian loanwords appeared in the Low Prussian dialect.

Low Prussian	Lithuanian	Standard German	English
Alus	alus	Bier	beer, ale
Burteninker	burtininkas	Wahrsager, Zauberer, Besprecher	magician, soothsayer, sorcerer
kalbeken [per section Common Prussian features it might rather be kalbeke]	kalbėti [to speak]	schwatzen	to palaver
Kausche, Kauszel	kaušas [wooden dipper]	Trinkschale	drinking bowl
Krepsch, Krepsche, Krepsze	krepšys, krepšas	Sack, Handsack, Ranzen	basket
Lorbas	liurbis	Lümmel	cheeky boy
Pirschlis	piršlys	Brautwerber	matchmaker
Wabel, Wabbel	vabalas	Käfer	bug

== Sample text: Klingelschleede ==
The writer Erminia von Olfers-Batocki (1876-1954) from Natangia wrote the following poem in Low Prussian:

Ek häbb e kleen Perdke, ek häbb ok e Pitsch,
Un e jrinlachtje Schleede, jewt dat e Jejlitsch!
Erscht Schnee is jefalle, rasch, Schimmelke vör!
Nu foahre wi Schleede, de kriez un de quer!
De Mitz uppe Kopp un de Feet mangket Stroh,
Fief Klingere am Schleede, dat bimmelt man so!
De Pitsch inner Fust un de Lien inne Händ,
Klinglustig! Doa kome de Kinder jerennt.
Un jederer schorrt, dat he upspringe kann!
He, Junges! Marjelles! Nu kick eener an!
Min Schemmel jait lustig met „Hussa" un „Hopp!"
Juch! Schneeballkes suse em äwere Kopp.
Nu lustig, ju Kinder, inne Schleede krupt rin,
To Gast kimmt de Winder, dem klingre wi in.

— Erminia von Olfers-Batocki, "Klingelschleede"
Translation:

I have a little horse, I also have a whip,
And I have a green painted(?) slide, so that will be a slip!
The first snow has fallen, swiftly, gray horse get in front of it!
Now we are going to slide everywhere!
The hat on the head, and the feet in the straw,
Five bells are fixed to the slide, what a ringing!
The whip in the fist and the leash in the hand,
It is ringing so merrily. The children come running.
And every one is running to get a ride!
Hey, boys! girls! Just look at that!
My horse is joyfully going with "Hussa" and "Hop"!
Oh my! Snowballs are flying by his head.
Well, happily, children, come on my slide,
Winter is here and we will ring to welcome it.

== See also ==
- German dialects
- High Prussian
- Old Prussian
- Plautdietsch

== Bibliography ==
- Mitzka, Walther (1922). "Dialektgeographie der Danziger Nehrung". Zeitschrift für Deutsche Mundarten (in German). 17: 117–135. JSTOR 40498141.
- Bauer, Gerhard: Baltismen im ostpreußischen Deutsch: Hermann Frischbiers „Preussisches Wörterbuch" als volkskundliche Quelle. In: Annaberger Annalen, Nr. 13, 2005, p. 5-82.
- Mitzka, Walther. Grundzüge nordostdeutscher Sprachgeschichte. (= DDG 59) Marburg (Elwert) 1959
- Riemann, Erhard. Die preußische Sprachlandschaft. In: Festschrift für Friedrich von Zahn Bd. 2 Köln/Wien 1971, 1-34
- Riemann, Erhard (Hrsg.). Preußisches Wörterbuch. Bd. 1, Lf. 1. Neumünster (Wachholtz) 1974
