= Westniederdeutsch =

Variety of Northern Low German

Lameli's uncommon Westniederdeutsch (lit. West Low German) is a variety of Northern Low German (nördliches Niederdeutsch), which is a group of Low German. It is not to be confused with the grouping West Low German, also called Westniederdeutsch in Standard High German, which includes other varieties.

It is spoken in the German states of Lower Saxony and North Rhine-Westphalia, and comprehends Westmünsterländisch, Münsterländisch, Emsländisch and the dialects of the Grafschaft Bentheim and the Landkreise Cloppenburg and Vechta. (Note: Westmünderländisch and Münsterländisch are elsewhere classified as part of Westphalian.)

Its varieties in Germany border to Low Franconian, North Low German (Nordniederdeutsch), and Southern Low German (Westphalian and Eastphalian). It is spoken in Germany up to about the Ruhr area. It has contact to the Dutch language.

Most people in the area of Westniederdeutsch do not speak this variety.
