= Ostkäslausch =

Low Prussian dialect of Poland

- Ostkäslausch
- Native to: Poland (formerly Germany)
- Region: Warmia, East Prussia
- Ethnicity: Germans
- Language family: Indo-European: Germanic; West Germanic; North Sea Germanic; Low German; East Low German; Low Prussian; Ostkäslausch

Language codes
- ISO 639-3: –

Ostkäslausch is a Low Prussian dialect of Low German spoken in an area of Poland, that used to be part of Germany.

== Geography ==
It used to be or is spoken in Warmia in East Prussia. Its border ran through Warmia. Ostkäslausch used to be spoken around Reszel and used to have borders to Breslausch, Natangian and Standard German. It has features of Eastphalian, Westphalian and East Pomeranian dialect.

The Eastern border of Ostkäslausch was the old border of Catholic Warmia to Protestant State of the Teutonic Order, it bordered to Natangian. It occurred, that Ostkäslausch and High Prussian were spoken in the same village.

== Phonology ==
There is gutturalisation of nd and nt to ng; usually an i added (Schtuing 'hour', cf. Standard German Stunde), but not in the preterite of strong verbs (jebunge 'bound', cf. Standard German gebunden). Ostkäslausche also has diphthongization of e and long o after ei and ou. O frequently has become io or iu. Ostkäslausch has influence of High Prussian. Most cases of Natangian diphthongization of e to ei and every o to ou occur in Ostkäslausch.

== Grammar ==
It has the preterite forms kam and nam.
