= Nehrungisch =

Dialect of Low Prussian

- Native to: Poland, Russia (formerly Germany)
- Region: Vistula Spit
- Ethnicity: Germans
- Language family: Indo-European: Germanic; West Germanic; North Sea Germanic; Low German; Northern Low German; Low Prussian; Nehrungisch
- Dialects: Chortitza-Plautdietsch

Language codes
- ISO 639-3: –

Nehrungisch (Standard High German: Nehrungisch, Mundart der Danziger Nehrung or Mundart der Frischen Nehrung) is a subdialect of Low Prussian, belonging to the Low German language variety. It was spoken in East Prussia and West Prussia, in the region around the Vistula Spit (Frische Nehrung) near Danzig. The easternmost locality where this variety was spoken was Narmeln, and it was spoken from Narmeln to Krakau (Krakowiec). Its Eastern border was to Mundart der Elbinger Höhe, a Low Prussian variety. The dialect survives in Chortitza- Plautdietsch, a dialect of Plautdietsch brought to Ukraine by migrants from the Vistula region. The distinguishing Chortitza features were present in the Northeast of the Vistula delta.

Nehrungisch shares features with Eastern Low Prussian.

== History ==
Those of the Mennonites from the Vistula lowlands, that originated from the lower part of the Rhine belonged together with those from Gdańsk (Danzig), Elbląg (Elbing), and the Żuławy Gdańskie (Danziger Werder) and entered the larger area in the second half of the 1540s. The majority of the Chortitza colonists were from the northernmost part of the Marienburger Werder, the Gdańsk Spit and the Gdańsk urban area. The Chortitza Colony Plautdietsch language had no major linguistic difference from the original Nehrungisch, which had changed by 1880. By then, the most conspicuous features (such as /eiw/ for /au/) were limited to the Vistula Spit. The border between Nehrungisch and Samlandic was between Narmeln and Neutief. Flemish Mennonites formed the majority in Chortitza Colony, the Frisian Mennonites settling separately in the same colony in Kronsweide, Schönwiese, Kronsgarten and Einlage. Einlage, Chortitza, had the largest Mennonite Brethren congregation of the country. Andreasfeld Mennonite Brethren Church was a daughter congregation, also in Chortitza. Sommerfelder, Reinländer Mennoniten Gemeinde, Evangelical Mennonite Mission Conference and the Gospel Mennonite Church are of Chortitza origin. Many south Mexican members of the Kleine Gemeinde are defectors from the Old Colony Mennonites. A number of words known on the Vistula Spit only in the 20th century were used in Danzig and the Weichselwerder at the beginning of the 19th century. Most residents of Chortitza Colony were from Żuławy Malborskie. The Pokraken congregation in East Prussia, members of Frisian congregations, migrated from West Prussia in 1713. It settled in Pokraken (present-day Leninskoye), Plauschwaren, Grigolienen, Bogdahnen, Neusorge, Sköpen (present-day Mostovoe), Elbings Kolonie (present-day Bolshaya Nemoninka), Grüneberg, Klubien and Allekneiten. Daughter colonies in northeastern Russia included Arkadak (with the villages of Wladmirowka, Borisopol, Dmitrowka, Marianowka, Wjasemskoje, Leonidowka and Lidjewka). Daughter colonies in Ukraine included Judenplan, Großfürstenland (with the villages of Georgstal, Sergejewka, Alexandertal, Michaelsburg, Olgafeld and Rosenbach), Bergtal (with the villages of Bergtal-Bodnja, Schönfeld, Schöntal, Heubuden and Friedrichstal), Tschornoglas (with the village of Gerhardstal), Borsenko (with the villages of Nowo-Sofiewka, Mariapol, Blumenfeld, Steinau, Hamburg, Neubergtal, Hoffnungsort), Nikolaipol (with the villages of Nikolaipol, Eichenfeld-Dubowka, Morosowo, Adelsheim-Dolinowka, Warwarowka, Tschistopol, Paulsheim-Pawlowka, Nadeshdowka [Iwangorod] and Jenelowka), Neplujewka (Starosawodskoje and Kislitschwewataja), Kusmitzky (with the village of Alexandrowka), Andreasfeld (with the village of Andreasfeld), Neu-Schönsee (with the village of Neu-Schönwise), Eugenfeld (with the village of Eugenfeld), Baratow (with the villages of Nowaja-Chortitza and Wodjanaja), Schlachtin (with the villages of Selenopol and Kamenopol), Neurosengart (with the villages of Neurosengart and Kronsfeld), Wiesenfeld (with the village of Wiesenfeld), Miloradowka (with the villages of Miloradowka and Jekaterinowka), Ignatjewo (with the villages of New Jork, Nikolajewka, Ignatjewo, Leonidowka, Romanowka, Jekaterinwoka and Alexejewka), Borissowo (with the villages of Ljubomirowka, Kondratjewka and Nioklaipol), Naumenko (with Grigorjewka, Petrowka, Wassiljewka and Jelenowka, mixed Chortzitza and Molotschna background), Zentral (with the village of Zentral) and Sadowaja (with the village of Anna). Yazykovo Mennonite Settlement was a daughter settlement of Chortitza and comprised several villages. Fürstenland Colony was founded by settlers from Chortitza. In the entire Soviet union, Chortitza Plautdietsch nouns in the masculine and neuter would only have the nominative case and an object case (in the dative form), in the feminine only one case (in nominative form), plural nouns would only have the object case anymore.

=== Villages in West Reserve, Canada ===
Furstenthal and Bergthal villages in West Reserve included the following:

- Bergfeld
- Blumenfeld
- Blumengart
- Blumenhof
- Blumenort, Manitoba
- Edenburg
- Einlage
- Grünfeld
- Grunthal, Manitoba
- Hochfeld, Manitoba
- Kleefeld, Manitoba
- Kronsfeld
- Lichtfeld
- Neuendorf
- Neuhorst
- Posenort
- Reinland
- Rosenfeld, Manitoba
- Rosengart
- Rosenthal
- Schöndorf
- Schönfeld
- Schönriese
- Schönthal
- Silberfeld
- Waldheim
- Zichenfeld
- Zigenhof

=== Diaspora ===
Chortitza-Plautdietsch is spoken in Mexico, in Altkolonie and Blumenau. Chihuahua, Texas and Bolivia's Santa Cruz Department have Nehrungisch-speaking residents. Plautdietsch speakers in Belize speak Chortitza-Plautdietsch. Mennonites arriving in the country since 1958 were Mexican Old Colony Sommerfelder and Kleine Gemeinde. Some migrated to Canada or northern Mexico. Mennonites of Mexico, Texas, Canada, Belize, western Kansas, and Bolivia are connected.

Descendants of those who left Chortitza for Canada in the 1870s (who live in many Latin American countries) have weak palatalization. In 1891, Manitoba Bergthal families arrived in Saskatchewan. During the 1940s, Manitoba and Saskatchewan Altkolonie Mennonites began to emigrate to northern Mexico. Spoken Plautdietsch in Mexico, Bolivia and Texas differs from that in Canada. Chortitza-Plautdietsch is spoken in Paraguay's Menno Colony. Reinfeld Colony in the country's Misiones Department was founded by people from Paraguay's Sommerfeld and Bergthal settlements. In Mexico, the use of Chortitza-Plautdietsch depends on whether a speaker is one of the Old Colony Mennonites. Nineteenth-century Mennonite migrants to Canada primarily came from the Chortitza Colony. There is no strict difference of Chortitza and Molotschna Plautdietsch in British Columbia. Among Old Colony Mennonites, it is relatively frequent to use words from Russian or Polish, in contrast to using recent loanwords. Many speakers of Plautdietsch exhibit features of both Chortitza- and Molotschna-Plautdietsch. The central cluster around the South Saskatchewan River is largely in the core Old Colony and Bergthaler settlement region, demarcated by the boundaries of the Hague-Osler Mennonite Reserve. The peripheral cluster in the northern and western valley encompasses areas primarily settled by Russländer immigrants after the mass emigration of Old Colony and Bergthaler Mennonites to Latin America in the 1920s. Canadian Chortitza descendants formed the first Latin American settlements of Mennonites of Dutch origin in 1922 in Chihuahua, Mexico.

In 1983, conservative Mennonites in northern Mexico began moving to the south of the country. Some Belizean Mennonites formed communities such as those in Quintana Roo; others joined preexisting Mexican congregations, such as those in Campeche. In 2006, there were approximately 6,900 Plautdietsch speakers in Belize.

Mexican Mennonites settled in Seminole, Texas (moving north from the original 1870s settlement), Oklahoma and Kansas. Mennonites first arrived in Seminole in 1977 from Cuactémoc, Chihuahua. In 2005, it was estimated that there was an estimated 5,000 Mennonites of Latin American origin (Keel 2006) living in southwestern Kansas in 2005, centered around Meade.

Non-Chortitza groups in Mexico have adopted many of the original settlers' Chortitza features. Mennonites in Campeche are predominantly Old Colony Mennonites, with Sommerfeld and Kleine Gemeinde Mennonites. Old Colony Mennonites from northern Mexico entered the Chenes region in greater numbers during the 1980s, and other Mennonite groups eventually moved into the region. Old Colony Mennonites predominate, with Sommerfeld and Kleine Gemeinde communities; an Evangelical Mennonite Conference community is much smaller than the others. Old Colony and Sommerfeld Mennonites are primarily from the states of Durango, Zacatecas, and Chihuahua; the Kleine Gemeinde includes members from Tamaulipas and Belize. Non-native speakers of Plautdietsch are not common. The largest group of non-native speakers of Plautdietsch in Southern Mexico are a group of Jehovah's Witnesses. About 6,000 Mennonites in Gaines County, Texas speak Plautdietsch, and 5,000 Mennonite residents of southwestern Kansas are of Latin American origin. Not all speakers of Plautdietsch there are Mennonites. Sommerfeld and Reinland are Chortitza denominations. The Russia German free churches excluding Mennonite Brethren churches cluster (in Germany) in the area around Bonn as well as Westphalia. They are overrepresented there among the Russia German free churches, but underrepresented among them in Rhineland-Palatinate and Lippe, where they cluster, too.

==== Bergthal Mennonites ====
Their congregations used to include:

- Altona, Manitoba
- Arden, Manitoba
- Carman, Manitoba
- Gladstone, Manitoba
- Graysville, Manitoba
- Gretna, Manitoba
- Grunthal, Manitoba
- Halbstadt, Manitoba
- Homewood, Manitoba
- Kane, Manitoba
- Lowe Farm
- MacGregor, Manitoba
- Morris, Manitoba
- Morden, Manitoba
- Plum Coulee
- Rosenfeld, Manitoba
- Steinbach, Manitoba
- Winkler, Manitoba (two)
- Winnipeg

== Phonology ==
For the distinctive features of Chortitza-Plautdietsch as opposed to Molotschna-Plautdietsch see Plautdietsch#Varieties.

=== Vowels ===
Concerning High Rounded Vowels, Lexical Allophones having [ɛɪv] and not [au], Low Opening Diphthongs, the Northeast of Vistula delta had distinguishing Chortitza features, the same area with the realization of syllabic nasals mentioned below. Before nd having become ŋ after a and u an approximant is entered. For West Germanic long o in the East of Nehrung a long e with a cedilla followed by an immediate o was spoken, in the West of Nehrung long o with a cedilla followed by ə. Nehrungisch has /i/ before /nt/ in words such as kint (child). It has non-velar /a/ as /au/. In originally-closed syllables, except before original /r/, /ld/ and /lp/, /e/ is the front vowel /a/. The Middle Low German /û/ became /yɐ/ before /r/ in Chortitza-Plautdietsch. It has a shortened /u/ before gutturals. Palatal /oa/ before /g and k/ was used in Nehrungisch, Chortitza-Plautdietsch having [øɐ]. Nehrungisch and Chortitza-Plautdietsch have /ê/ instead of /au/ (/a/ otherwise). From Narmeln to Kąty Rybackie, in originally-open syllables before /k/ and /x/, /a/ became [e:o] – west of there, an [e:ɐ]. Palatal character of vowels of Chortitza-Plautdietsch can be explained from East Flemish.

Varieties of Chortitza-Plautdietsch render Middle Low German /ê/ as [øi], for example [øint] (one) and [zøit] (sweet). Some speakers of Chortitza-Plautdietsch, for example from Orenburg and Altai colonies in Russia, both of those having linguistically relevant influence of Molotschna-Plautdietsch tend to realize [ee] as [øi]. The mother colonies Am Trakt founded in 1854 and Alt-Samara founded in 1859 only have weak palatalization. Many descendants living in Latin America of those who left Chortitza for Canada in the 1870s only have weak palatization. The west of the Nehrung had /ōe/ for the /ēo/ of the eas, for example krōech/krēoch for High German languages' Krug and kōechen/kēochen for High German Kuchen. Few Chortitza varieties have front vowels. Many Mexican speakers of Plautdietsch have [iː] for words such as äkj, merging with [iː] in words such as biet. <oa> diphthongs before velars in Chortitza-Plautdietsch are [œɐ], [ɛɐ], [øɐ], [eɐ], [œʊ], [ɛʊ], [øʊ], and [eʊ]. The word for to cook was realized including ɔɑ in Niederchortitza in Chortitza, being a mainly Molotschna-related realization. However, there also was the general Chortitza realization of infinitive -n, but not in Kronsweide.

=== Consonants ===
Nehrungisch has d between vowels as r. Chortitza-Plautdietsch has lost /r/ before dental consonants as an off-glide. The /n/ of /an/, /un/, and /in/ is lost before /r/, /l/, /m/ and /n/. It exhibits rhotacisation of /d/ between vowels as /r/. Mexican Plautdietsch speakers have a more back pronunciation of <kj>, <gj> <tj> and <dj> than German Plautdietsch speakers who have a more assibilated pronunciation. The Chortitza-Plautdietsch reflex in Mexico of off-glide of words such as OA is usually [w] < [ɣ] (e.g. Foagel 'fowl' [fɛwl] < [fœɑɣl]). It is sometimes [ɹ] before voiceless velar consonants (e.g. Knoaken 'bone' [knɛɹkn]<[knœɑken]). In contrast to other major features of Chortitza Plautdietsch, palatal plosives were dominant in Vistula Delta.

=== Flemish influence ===
In the coastal area from Danzig to Elbing, Flemish Mennonites predominated. Palatised vowels in Chortitza-Plautdietsch derived from East Flemish. Nehrungisch and Chortitza-Plautdietsch palatise velar vowels. East Flemish has long /o/ as /y.ə/ and Chortitza-Plautdietsch has long /o/ before /g, k and ch/. Nehrungisch and Chortitza-Plautdietsch have the plural ending /-en/, possibly influenced by Dutch. Most of the early Mennonite settlers in Ukraine were Flemish Mennonites from the northern delta (Nehrung) region.

=== Palatalisation ===
Nehrungisch's palatalisation more likely originated in the Baltic and West Prussia than from Frisian. Chortitza-Plautdietsch has palatalisation (/kj/ and /gj/), which probably also existed in West Prussia. The eastern Nehrung and Tiegenhofer Niederung had slight palatalization (/k/ to /kj/), particularly in the diminutive ending /-ke/ (such as frǖkjen for High German Frauchen and maunkjen for High German Männchen).

Descendants of those who left the Chortitza Colony for the Orenburg Colony in 1894 have the palatalization of Molotschna Plautdietsch: /c/ and /ɟ/. This was probably due to the foundation of a colony by people from Molotschna Colony near the Orenburg Colony in 1895 and the introduction of four years of alternative service in forestry for Mennonite men in the 1870s. Chortitza-Plautdietsch has the palatal oral stops <kj> and <gj>. Lenition of the voiced palatal oral stop, accompanied by lowering and lengthening the preceding BITT class, is common in southern Mexico. Some speakers have raised allophones of the BITT class before all palatal stops, but only the ones before voiced palatal stops develop into closing diphthongs. Many voiced palatal oral stops, accompanied by lowering and lengthening of the preceding vowels, occur in southern Mexico. Some speakers have raised allophones of vowels before palatal stops, but only those before voiced palatal stops develop into closing diphthongs. In general, Mexican Plautdietsch speakers have a more back pronunciation of palatal oral stops than German Plautdietsch speakers.

=== Isoglosses ===
Isoglosses in the original dialect area are:

- /a/ primarily /au/
- Shortened /u/ in words such as hupe have no shortened /u/ before /p/.
- /n/-loss in kannst
- Long /o/ is shortened before /l+dental/; umlaut lacking in words such as kaufen
- Final /-n/
- /l/-loss in willst and sollst
- Loss of /n/ in /an-/, /in-/, /un-/ before the fricatives /r, l, m, n and g/.
- büten, dün, glüpen etc. versus buten, dun, glupen etc.
- haiwen, blaif etc. versus haue, blau etc. Most of the dialect has High German /au/ as /eiw/, in words such as greiw (High German grau, English grey), in contrast to Werdersch and Molotschna-Plautdietsch.

== Grammar ==
Chortitza-Plautdietsch has an accusative case. The Low Prussian dialect has accusative and dative cases. Chortitza-Plautdietsch has eant for "them". It has formal address using the second-person pronoun jie.

Chortitza-Plautdietsch's infinitives and plurals end in -en. For verbs with two preterite forms, Chortitza-Plautdietsch has former conjunctives. Chortitza-Plautdietsch has double infinitive forms, and a participle of the verb to be. It has the infinitive and first-person singular and plural of "to be" (senn) and "to have" (han).

There is one case for plural and one case for feminine nouns. This is the case for Chortitza-Plautdietsch as well. It is common to use waut (otherwise meaning what) instead of daut for that. Among Plautdietsch speakers in Mexico and Russia, who speak the respective national language quite well it is relatively common, which probably is interference by the respective national language.

== See also ==
- Mennonites

== Bibliography ==
- Brandt, Carsten (1992). Sprache und Sprachgebrauch der Mennoniten in Mexiko (in German). Marburg: Elwert. p. 252.
- Burns, Roslyn (2016). New World Mennonite Low German: An Investigating of Changes in Progress (PhD). UC Berkeley.
- Cox, Christopher Douglas (2015). Quantitative perspectives on variation in Mennonite Plautdietsch (PDF) (Thesis). University of Alberta.
- Jähnig, Bernhard; Letkemann, Peter, eds. (1985). Danzig in acht Jahrhunderten (in German). Nicolaus-Copernicus-Verlag.
- Mitzka, Walther (1922). "Dialektgeographie der Danziger Nehrung". Zeitschrift für Deutsche Mundarten (in German). 17: 117–135. JSTOR 40498141.
- Mitzka, Walther (1968). Kleine Schriften (in German). Walter de Gruyter & Co.
- Penner, Horst (1952). Weltweite Bruderschaft (in German). Karlsruhe: Heinrich Schneider.
- Penner, Nikolai (2009). The High German of Russian Mennonites in Ontario (PDF) (Thesis). Waterloo, Ontario, Canada: University of Waterloo.
- Quiring, Jacob (1928). Die Mundart von Chortitza in Süd-Russland (in German). Munich: Druckerei Studentenhaus München.
- Siemens, Heinrich (2012). Plautdietsch: Grammatik, Geschichte, Perspektiven (in German). Bonn: Tweeback Verlag. ISBN 9783981197853.
- Ziesemer, Walther (1924). Die ostpreußischen Mundarten (in German). Breslau: Ferdinand Hirt.
