= Elbingian =

Subdialect of Low Prussian dialect of Low German

- Native to: Poland (formerly Germany)
- Region: Elbingian upland (West Prussia, East Prussia)
- Ethnicity: Germans
- Language family: Indo-European: Germanic; West Germanic; North Sea Germanic; Low German; East Low German; Low Prussian; Elbingian

Language codes
- ISO 639-3: –

Elbingian (German: Mundart der Elbinger Höhe, lit. 'dialect of the Elbingian upland') was a subdialect of Low Prussian spoken in East Prussia and West Prussia in the region of the Elbingian upland, north of Elbing. It had a border with Oberländisch, Mundart des Kürzungsgebiets and Nehrungisch. It used to end shortly East of Elbing river.

== Phonology ==
There was a border of /i/, /e/ and /ar/ becoming /e/, /a/ and /or/ respectively in its area. It has many features in common with Natangian.

== Bibliography ==
- Kuhn, Willi (2010). Schuch, Hans J. (ed.). Die niederdeutsche Mundart auf der Elbinger Höhe: Kliene Geschichtge toom Grefflache opp Platt ut dee Kinger- onn Schooltied (in German and Low German). Truso.
