= Natangian =

Low Prussian dialect of Poland

- Native to: Poland and Kaliningrad Oblast, Russia (formerly Germany)
- Region: East Prussia
- Ethnicity: Germans
- Language family: Indo-European: Germanic; West Germanic; North Sea Germanic; Low German; East Low German; Low Prussian; Natangian

Language codes
- ISO 639-3: –

Natangian (Natangisch) was a Low Prussian dialect, spoken in Natangen, East Prussia.

== Geography ==
It was spoken in Natangen around Zinten, Bartenstein, Friedland, Drengfurt and Rastenburg. Natangian has or used to have a border with Breslausch (a High Prussian dialect), Mundart des Kürzungsgebiets, Ostsamländisch, Mundart des Ostgebietes, Westkäslausch and Ostkäslausch. There was a border of Prince-Bishopric of Warmia to the state of the Teutonic Order, which also was the border of Natangian to Ostkäslausch.

== Phonology ==
In difference to Samländisch, vowel breaking of every long e to ei and every o to ou and the word dirch are characteristic. It has significant features shared with Mundart der Elbinger Höhe. A is palatal.
