= Mundart des Kürzungsgebiets =

The Kürzungsgebietsmundart (spoken in the Haffgebiet or Kürzungsgebiet am Haff) is a subdialect of Low Prussian, part of Low German, spoken in today's Poland. In 1918, it was spoken in East Prussia and West Prussia in their respective then borders. The Kürzungsgebietsmundart was spoken around Braunsberg and Frauenburg and had a border to Natangian, Westkäslausch, Mundart der Elbinger Höhe and Oberländisch (a High Prussian dialect). There was influence of Salzburgers. The Western border to Elbing Upland was a border of denominations. Part of its Southern border was undetermined by political or religious borders. Long e before p, t and k is shortened to short i, long o before t and k is shortened to u. In the western part, also long u before k was shortend to short u. Between Plasswich and Borchertsdorf, its only border to High Prussian ran.
