= Eastern Low Prussian =

Low Prussian dialect

- German: Mundart des Ostgebietes
- Native to: Lithuania, Poland, Russia (formerly Germany)
- Region: East Prussia
- Ethnicity: Germans, Prussian Lithuanians
- Language family: Indo-European: Germanic; West Germanic; North Sea Germanic; Low German; East Low German; Low Prussian; Eastern Low Prussian

Language codes
- ISO 639-3: –

Eastern Low Prussian (German: Mundart des Ostgebietes, lit. dialect of the Eastern territory) is a subdialect of Low Prussian that was spoken around Angerburg (now Węgorzewo, Poland), Insterburg (Chernyakhovsk, Russia), Memelland (Klaipėda County, Lithuania), and Tilsit (Sovetsk, Kaliningrad Oblast, Russia) in the eastern territories of East Prussia in the former eastern territories of Germany. Many speakers of this subdialect were Prussian Lithuanians.

== Geography ==
Eastern Low Prussian had borders with Ostsamländisch, Natangian, and Standard German. Lithuanian language was spoken within its area.

== Phonology ==
In difference to varieties to the West, it had no vocalization of /r/. Its alveolar /r/ probably counts among its influences from Lithuanian. Werdersch has an alveolar as well. Like in Werdersch, it has du motst meaning you have to. Eastern Low Prussian has a greater phonetic affinity to Standard German than Samlandic. The /ai/ of Samlandic is given as /ei/ with long /e/.

It has features common with Nehrungisch. It has major High German influence, a Lithuanian substrate, even numerous words having undergone High German consonant shift. High German influence is, though not exclusively, by Salzburg Protestants.

It has dorx (with the ach-Laut) for High German durch, English through.

== Grammar ==
There was a diminutive ending -l around Gusev, Kaliningrad Oblast (Gumbinnen), explained by Upper German influence.

== Bibliography ==
- Besch, Werner; Knoop, Ulrich; Putschke, Wolfgang; Wiegand, Herbert E. (14 July 2008). Dialektologie: Ein handbuch zur deutschen und allemeinen Dialektforschung (in German). Vol. 2 (Halbband ed.). Walter de Gruyter. p. 892. ISBN 978-3-11-020333-2.
- Mitzka, Walther (1968). Kleine Schriften. Walter de Gruyter & Co. p. 209.
- Poschenrieder, Thorwald (1995) [19-20 May 1994], "Deutsch und baltischsprachige Preußen des Memellandes", in Von Gertrud Bense, Herausgegeben; Kozianka, Maria; Meinhold, Gottfried (eds.), Deutsch-litauische Kulturbeziehungen: Kolloquium zu Ehren von August Schleicher (PDF) (in German), Collegium Europaeum Jenense, University of Jena, p. 130
- Ziesemer, Walther (1924). Die ostpreußischen Mundarten (in German). Breslau: Ferdinand Hirt. pp. 128–129, 133.
