= Samlandic =

German dialect

- Samländisch
- Native to: Poland, Russia (formerly Germany)
- Region: East Prussia
- Ethnicity: Germans
- Language family: Indo-European: Germanic; West Germanic; North Sea Germanic; Low German; East Low German; Low Prussian; Samlandic

Language codes
- ISO 639-3: –

Samlandic was a Low Prussian dialect of Low German. It was divided into Ostsamländisch and Westsamländisch. Both were from East Prussia.

== Geography ==
Westsamländisch was spoken West of Königsberg. Westsamländisch had a border with Ostsamländisch.

Ostsamländisch was spoken around Königsberg, Labiau and Wehlau. Ostsamländisch had a border with Natangian, Westsamländisch and Eastern Low Prussian.

Samlandic was spoken around Neukuhren and Heydekrug.

== Phonology ==
Westsamländisch has, in contrast to the remainder of Samlandic, for (I) go, (I) stand etc. jon, schton etc. O before R is spoken with a long vowel. It has ick sint meaning I am and tije for ten. Westsamländisch has long u as long ü. A is palatal. It has dorx (with the ach-Laut) for High German durch, English through.

== History ==
During the latter age of the Teutonic order, Latvian-Curonian fishermen came to nowadays Pionerski, Primorye, and Filino.

== Culture ==
Anke van Tharaw is a poem written in Samlandic.

== Bibliography ==
- Wanda Nimtz-Wendlandt: Die Nehringer, Elwert, 1986. ISBN 3-7708-0834-7.
