= Southern Low German =

Language variety

Southern Low German (südliches Niederdeutsch) is a variety of Low German in Germany. Its varieties in Germany are divided into Westphalian and Eastphalian. It borders to Low Franconian, High German and Northern Low German. The Low German varieties of Germany excluding Eastphalian and Westphalian are Northern Low German.

In Germany, it is spoken in parts of the Ruhr area inter alia. It is spoken in several states of Germany. Eastphalian had two language islands within its area. The approximate border of Westphalian entirely is within respectively coincides with the border of Westphalia-Lippe.

There is an ISO 639-3 code for both Low German (nds) and Westphalian (wep), although Westphalian belongs to Low German.

== Division of Low German into regional classifications ==
Northern vs. Southern Low German is a concept to refute West vs. East Low German. The division into a western and an eastern part of Low German has historical reasons (homeland of the Saxons vs. colonyland of the Saxons) as well as linguistic reasons (unit plural of the 1st, 2nd and 3rd person plural present in -et or -en).

The definition of Northern Low German is defined at its simplest by a kind of "exclusion definition", such as "Northern Low German is all Low German dialects without the specific characteristics of Southern Low German (= Eastphalian and Westphalian)". Otherwise it is quite difficult to find common features for Northern Low German, at most the common quite advanced level of sound development.

South Westphalian is spoken in South Westphalia, including the Hellweg region in South Westphalia, in the Dortmund and Bochum area and West thereof. South Westphalian also is spoken in the Ruhr area. A large part of the Ruhr area is within the area of South Westphalian. The Rhineland borders to Westphalia - the former border between the Rhineland and Westphalia being Deilbach river in Langenberg (Rhineland).

== History of Low German ==
Deilbach approximately used to be the border between the tribal duchies of Lower Lotharingia and Saxony (including the former, nowadays merged town of Steele, Essen). It possibly was the settlement border between Franks and Saxons. As a borderland to Westphalia - the historical border between the traditional Rhineland and Westphalia lies in Langenberg - there were numerous Westphalian influences. Low German is much more closely related to Dutch than to High German, despite the Benrath line north of which the sound shift (mainly) was not carried out.

The Old Saxon dialects form the historical basis of today's Low German dialects.

The majority of the Low German dialect area belonged to Prussia long before 1871. In the Kingdom of Hanover before annexation by Prussia, Low German was not the official language. The situation may have been more like the situation of the German language dialects today in Switzerland. After all, the way in which Standard German was pronounced by people from the Southern Low German dialect area partly standardized the standard German accent, before Bismarck. From the 17th century High German was written in Northern Germany (change of the writing language). By 1700 at the latest, all public offices without exception were using High German, which can be attributed to the decline of the Hanseatic League and other circumstances. Low German, on the other hand, continued to be used as the spoken language. Therefore, the official language was High German. The decline in Low German as a spoken language again came from the cities, not only educated middle classes.

In the Southern Low German dialect area its Low German features increase to the north (in every village and in every town the language used to be different). There are transitional areas between various dialect areas.

== Low German language border ==
The Low German language border is not just a single isogloss sound shift, but a thick set of isoglosses that not only includes consonantism, but also vowelism, morphology and vocabulary. The Low German language border is without a doubt, even if one were to exclude the differences resulting from the sound shift, the most important and sharpest language border within continental West Germanic (excluding the Frisian languages). But, "gradual transition, dialect continuum, no sharp language boundary" are not really the terms that describe this language boundary well.

An example is a sentence from the Wenker questionnaire (after Georg Wenker):

- English: How many pounds of sausage and how much bread do you want?
- Standard High German: Wieviel Pfund Wurst und wieviel Brot wollt ihr haben?
- in the North Thuringian dialect of Bad Sachsa, just south of the language border: Wie vēle Fund Worscht un wie vēle Brōt wull di hā?
- in the Low German of Barbis, a few kilometers further north-west: Wo veele Pund Wost un wo veele Brohd will ji hemmen?

It is easy to see that several words in this short sentence differ significantly in the stem of the word.

In Northern Thuringia, the border is fairly clear and has not been moved for a long time. The transition to Low German is fluid in some places, e.g. in the Rhineland. In Saxony-Anhalt, the language border has moved north over the centuries. The language border used to be between Halle and Leipzig, formerly both Low German speaking. As a result, there is a wide foreland in which there is a Low German substrate. But in the core areas, this foreland is also Central German through and through. In the case of words in which Low German and High German have clearly different stems, such as "hebben" and "seggen" for "haben" ("to have") and "sagen" ("to say"), the isogloss for the umlauted forms at least mostly follows the Benrath line. What has a blurring effect in Saxony-Anhalt and Brandenburg is the fact that there has been a massive loss of Low German language since Wenker's time. In Saxony-Anhalt and Brandenburg there are still communities of people who speak Low German, i.e. more than individuals who can still remember without actively speaking the language today, is not a whole lot. But at least in Wenker's time, the border was often not fluid or blurred.

There is the Low German unit plural, which is one of the most important characteristics of Low German. High German does not have unit plural, with the exception of Alemannic. Alemannic developed its unit plural independently of Low German and only in the 17th century, while the Low German unit plural is probably at least 1,500 years old.

If you superimpose these isoglosses, such as unit plural, kallen vs. küern, onger vs. unner or even was vs. wor and ik versto vs. ik verstonn, then a fairly clearly defined line emerges. It possibly makes sense to end at the German-Dutch border, because the state border here is also a border of the Dachsprachen.

=== Border to Bergish ===
The Westphalian line forms a clear bundle of isoglosses. Occasionally an isogloss or two will veer and bypass some locations, but the main bundle forms a clear line. While the people in the centre of Langenberg say, "wi kallen ohn Ongerschied", a few kilometers further in Niederbonsfeld they say "wi küert ohn Unnerscheid". These are only three words, but they contain five typical differences: "o" instead of "u" in "onger"/"unner" is very typical for the entire Lower Rhine, while it hardly ever occurs in Westphalia. Then there is "ng" instead of "nn" and a different vowel development in "schied" and "scheid". With "kallen" vs. "küert" there are two very clear differences. First the verb "kallen", which is typically Lower Rhine, versus the verb "küern", which is typically Westphalian.

Essen-Werden is within the area of Bergish, not on its border, but its border used to be the state border of the abbey principality of Werden monastery. Essen partly belongs to Westphalian, Werden to Bergish. So-called East Bergish is spoken in the South East and other parts of Essen (Essen-Überuhr, Werden, Schuir, Haarzopf, Bredeney, Fischlaken, Heidhausen, Kettwig excluding Kettwig vor der Brücke, Hinsbeck, Rodberg, Vossnacken, parts of Byfang and parts of Dilldorf). Heisingen speaks Bergish as well. Here the Eastern border of Bergish coincides with the border of Rhenish accentuation like everywhere, the only exception being the area around Hückeswagen and Lennep, including the centre of Lüttringhausen.

=== Border to Central or Middle German ===
The (West Central German) dialect of the Siegerland is called "Platt" coincidentally, but (despite its sharp demarcation from the Southern Low German Sauerland Platt) is spoken far into the Central German language area, showing features of Low German and Upper/High German. Its vocabulary and grammar mostly are Central German. It is called Middle German precisely because it has gone through the sound shift to different parts, i.e. less "shifted" Low German and more "shifted" High German shares. In Siegerland, for example, they say "Botze" instead of "pants" (cf.: Northern German: "Büx"), "häh" instead of "er" (cf.: English/Low German/Dutch: "he"), "Knippchen " instead of "knife" (cf.: Low German: "Knipp/ken", Fries.: "Knif" and English: "knife" as well as "Huése" instead of High German: "Stockings" (cf.: English: "hoses"). "Sevenzich" (English 70 = "seventy") is another one of countless examples. Siegerländer Platt (in which there is also the "substantialization of female first names, this peculiarity can also be found in neighboring Central Hessian: "das/dat Anneliese"), like Thuringian or Frankfurter South Hessian, is not part of the Low German language, in contrast to Hamburger or Rostocker Platt, only being called Platt. The Wittgensteiner Platt is already Central Hessian, but not Central Franconian, and is spoken in a small area in the district of Siegen-Wittgenstein in the extreme South of North Rhine-Westphalia. Finally, in Rhenish Franconian, the third unvoiced stop /t/ was shifted between vowels and in the final to /s/. Rhenish Franconian dialects are distinguished from Moselle-Franconian dialects by the Bad Goar line (also called the Hunsrück barrier or dat/das line).

== List of dialects ==
- Eastphalian
- Westphalian, in a strict sense: In Lameli's classification this covers roughly the area of South and East Westphalian. Westmünderländisch and Münsterländisch – which are commonly classified as part of Westphalian – are classified by him as part of Westniederdeutsch.

== Status ==
Today, most people in the area of Southern Low German do not speak this variety. It's simply no longer spoken there in everyday life, at most on local folkloric evenings by elderly people, who read dialect poetry from sight or recite it by heart, but not as a living everyday language. In general, a strong retreat of all dialects can be observed everywhere due to the influence of Standard High German media and the mobility of numerous people (and thus the mixing of the individual variants). There are or used to be items in Southern Low German in daily newspapers. If Low German is used at all, it frequently is Northern Low German. In television in Germany, various varieties of Northern Low German are used.

== Regiolects on Southern Low German substrate ==
Native speakers rolled tongue R (as in Spanish), unlike the High German throat R. The pronunciation of the word "speak" (s-prrrechen/ s-prechen/ schprechen) also revealed a few things. The change in sound from [aɪ̯] to [aː] is characteristic of Eastphalian (especially in comparison to other Low German dialects), especially in the central and southern part of the Eastphalian dialect area. This development has not been completed to this day, includes more and more words and also spreads to the local High German colloquial language, mockingly emphasized with sayings like "mit baad'n Baan'n in den Hildeshaama Wassa-aama" "with both feet in the Hildesheim water bucket" (Eastphalian: mē bā'n Bān'n in'n Hilmssă Wåtă-ammă). There used to be inter alia the following pronunciations in the regiolect of the city of Hanover: pronunciation of High German [aː] as /äö/ ("Konraad, sprich ein klaares Aa! – Jäö, Vadda, jäö!" for Standard German "Konrad, sprich ein klares A! – Ja, Vater, ja!", meaning "Konraad, speak a clear [aː] – Yes, daddy, yes!"), [s] as [ʃ] ("s-tolpan üba’n s-pitz'n S-taan" for Standard German "über spitzen Stein stolpern" meaning "stumble over the pointed stone") and the pronunciation of /r/ before voiceless plosives as [x] ("is doch gochkaan Themäö" instead of Standard German "ist doch gar kein Thema" for "is not an issue at all"). Nowadays in Hanover Region still "s-tolpern über'n s-pitzen S-tein" is said. The ö-heavyness of the colloquial language is characterized in the municipality of Uetze (between Wolfsburg and Hanover) with the sentence: "Sonntachs um ölf (or: "ölwe") nach der Körche, wenn der Hörsch röhrt!" for Standard German "Sonntags um elf nach der Kirche, wenn der Hirsch röhrt!" meaning "Sundays at eleven after church, when the stag roars!"

Missingsch (still) ekes out at most a niche existence in everyday conversation in Hanover. In such surveys, people regularly describe themselves as dialect speakers who at best speak the dialect superficially. Secondly, there are numerous areas in Germany where respondents are not sure what is meant by "dialect". This ambiguity is also often found in newspaper articles and even in statements by linguists.
