= Lubieszewo, Pomeranian Voivodeship =

Village in Pomeranian Voivodeship, Poland

Lubieszewo
- Village
- Location within Poland
- Coordinates: 54°11′24″N 19°2′20″E
- Country: Poland
- Voivodeship: Pomeranian
- County: Nowy Dwór
- Gmina: Nowy Dwór Gdański
- Population: 780

Lubieszewo ([lubjɛˈʂɛvɔ]; German: Ladekopp) is a village in the administrative district of Gmina Nowy Dwór Gdański, within Nowy Dwór County, Pomeranian Voivodeship, in northern Poland.
