= Filino, Kovrovsky District, Vladimir Oblast =

Filino Филино
- Settlement
- Location within Vladimir Oblast Location within Russia
- Coordinates: 56°22′N 41°35′E
- Country: Russia
- Region: Vladimir Oblast
- District: Kovrovsky District
- Time zone: UTC+3:00

Filino (Russian: Филино) is a rural locality (a settlement) in Klyazminskoye Rural Settlement, Kovrovsky District, Vladimir Oblast, Russia. The population was 173 as of 2010.

== Geography ==
Filino is located 20 km east of Kovrov (the district's administrative centre) by road. Misaylovo is the nearest rural locality.
