= Danzig German =

German dialect

- Region: Gdańsk
- Ethnicity: Danzig Prussians
- Language family: Indo-European: Germanic; West Germanic; North Sea Germanic; Low German; East Low German; Low Prussian; Danzig German
- Early forms: Proto-Indo-European: Proto-Germanic; Old Saxon; Middle Low German
- Writing system: German alphabet

Language codes
- ISO 639-3: –

Danzig German (German: Danziger Deutsch) are Northeastern German dialects spoken in Gdańsk, Poland. It forms part of the Low Prussian dialect that was spoken in the region before the mass-expulsion of the speakers following the end of World War II. Nowadays, Danzig German is only passed within families.

== History ==
In the 12th century, a German merchant settlement in the area of today's Long Market of Gdańsk arose, close to a Prussian-Kashubian settlement, creating a language contact between Slavic languages, Baltic languages, and Germanic languages. The settlement attracted more German settlers, mainly from Lower Saxony, Westphalia and Hannover, whose Low German language became the dominating language. As subject of the Teutonic Order the town grew to a German town granted Magdeburg law.

As part of the Hanseatic League, the town acquired a Platt dialect that also derived elements from the Dutch, Prussian, and from local Kashubian and Polish language as well. For example, plûz, zuk, Pomuchel (cod), Kujel (boar) are borrowings from the Polish language.

The city's official communication employed Low German until 1563, when a letter in Low German was sent to Nieuport, while neighboring Elbing and Braunsberg had switched to High German by the middle of the 15th century. With the spread of High German through education, Danzig Platt was spoken only by a small fraction of the city's population. Still, Danzig Platt literature started to evolve at the end of the 18th century.

After having switched to High German, the major part of the town came to speak Danziger Missingsch. When Danzig became loyal to Poland along with Royal Prussia, German was maintained as the town's language.

== Linguistic properties ==
Danzig Platt deviated significantly from North German Platt. While North German Platt has the pronunciations maken ("to make"), slapen ("to sleep"), seggen ("to say"), vertellen ("to tell, narrate"), in Danzig Platt the forms are moake, schloape, saje, vertalle.

== Danzig Missingsch ==
Typical of Danzig Missingsch is apocope of a final 'e' as in Katz (cat) or Straß (street), and the unrounding of the front rounded vowels ü and ö so that Tier (door) is pronounced instead of Standard High German (SHG) Tür, and Sehne (sons) instead of Söhne.

Danzig Missingsch employs spirantization of initial g to j in e.g. jelaufen (walked) instead of SHG gelaufen.

Typical for Danzig Missingsch is the widespread use of the diminutive -chen, such as was-chen ("what is the matter?") - Danzig German typically deviates in employing grammatical feminine gender for certain words that are masculine in SHG, such as die Weiz (der Weizen - "the wheat") and die Taback instead of der Taback ("the tobacco"), and neuter gender for other words that are masculine in SHG, such as das Monat, das Leib.

== Literature ==
- Viola Wilcken (2015). Historische Umgangssprachen zwischen Sprachwirklichkeit und literarischer Gestaltung: Formen, Funktionen und Entwicklungslinien des 'Missingsch' (in German)., esp. p. 71ff.
