= Żuławki =

- Village
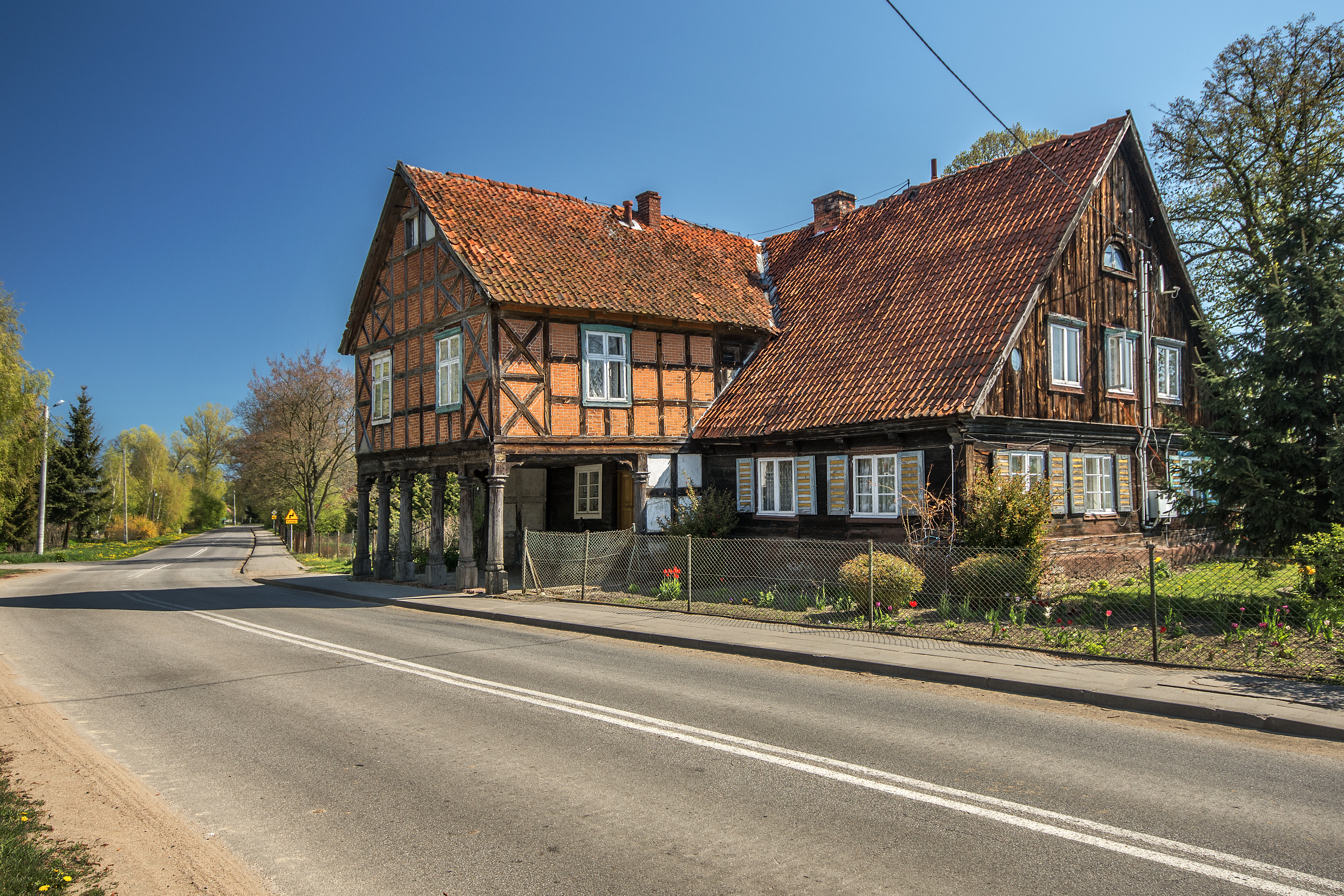
- Timberframe Mennonite house

- Location within Poland
- Coordinates: 54°17′5″N 18°58′17″E
- Country: Poland
- Voivodeship: Pomeranian
- County: Nowy Dwór
- Gmina: Stegna
- Population: 683

Żuławki ([ʐuˈwafki]; German: Fürstenwerder) is a village in the administrative district of Gmina Stegna, within Nowy Dwór County, Pomeranian Voivodeship, in northern Poland.

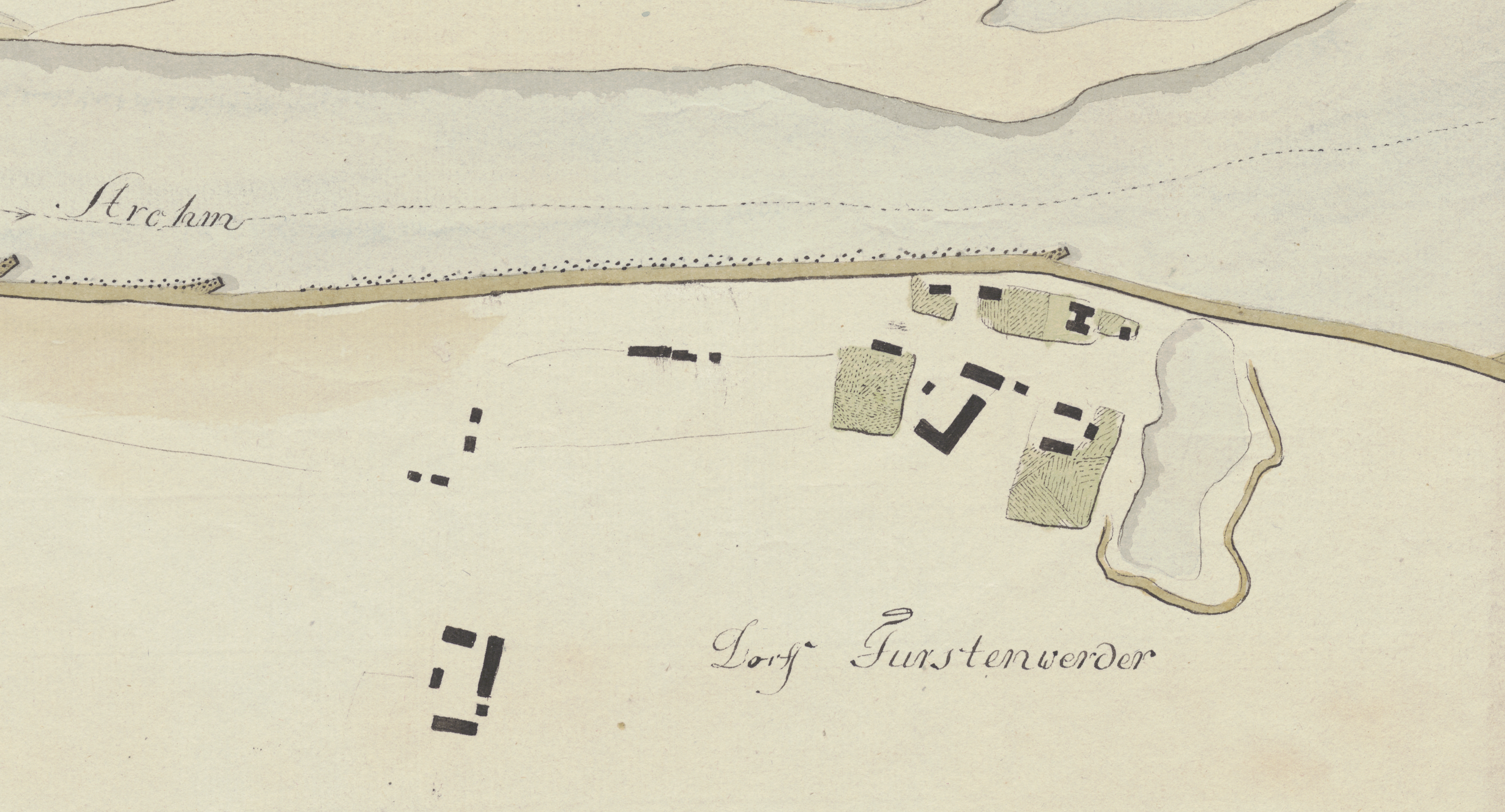
Map of Fürstenwerder, today Żuławki (c. 1795)

For the history of the region, see History of Pomerania.
