= Filino, Totemsky District, Vologda Oblast =

Filino Филино
- Village
- Location within Vologda Oblast Location within Russia
- Coordinates: 59°32′N 42°24′E
- Country: Russia
- Region: Vologda Oblast
- District: Totemsky District
- Time zone: UTC+3:00

Filino (Russian: Филино) is a rural locality (a village) in Tolshmenskoye Rural Settlement, Totemsky District, Vologda Oblast, Russia. The population was 4 as of 2002.

== Geography ==
Filino is located 86 km southwest of Totma (the district's administrative centre) by road. Shulgino is the nearest rural locality.
