= Filino, Sobinsky District, Vladimir Oblast =

Filino Филино
- Village
- Location within Vladimir Oblast Location within Russia
- Coordinates: 56°07′N 39°58′E
- Country: Russia
- Region: Vladimir Oblast
- District: Sobinsky District
- Time zone: UTC+3:00

Filino (Russian: Филино) is a rural locality (a village) in Kurilovskoye Rural Settlement, Sobinsky District, Vladimir Oblast, Russia. The population was 1 as of 2010.

== Geography ==
Filino is located 19 km north of Sobinka (the district's administrative centre) by road. Stavrovo is the nearest rural locality.
