= Stogi, Pomeranian Voivodeship =

Stogi
- Village
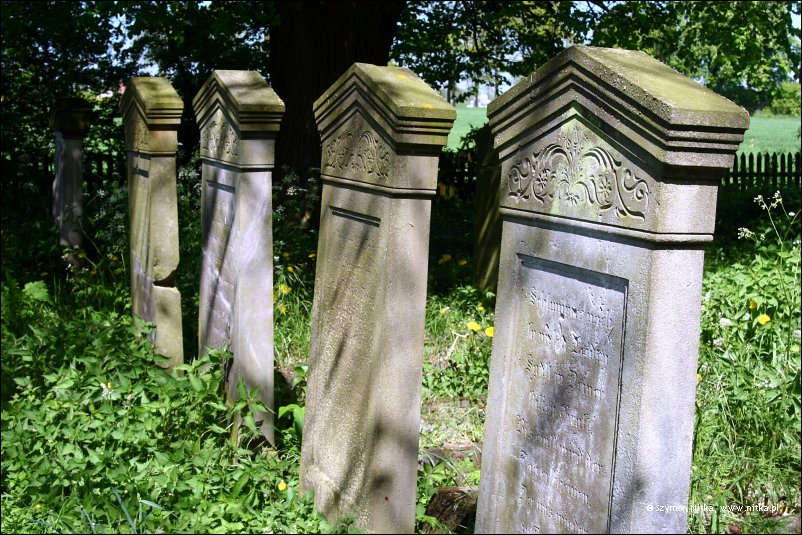
- Mennonite cemetery

- Location within Poland
- Coordinates: 54°4′34″N 18°58′31″E
- Country: Poland
- Voivodeship: Pomeranian
- County: Malbork
- Gmina: Malbork
- Population: 430

Stogi [ˈstɔɡi] is a village in the administrative district of Gmina Malbork, within Malbork County, Pomeranian Voivodeship, in northern Poland. It is known for its historical Mennonite cemetery founded by Olędrzy, people of Dutch or German ancestry who settled Poland hundreds of years ago.

Before 1772, the area was part of the Kingdom of Poland, from 1772 to 1919 of Prussia and Germany, from 1920 to 1939 of the Free City of Danzig, and from September 1939 to February 1945 of Nazi Germany.

== Former Mennonite village of Heubuden ==
In Stogi there is the oldest (1768) and one of the biggest Mennonite cemeteries of Poland.

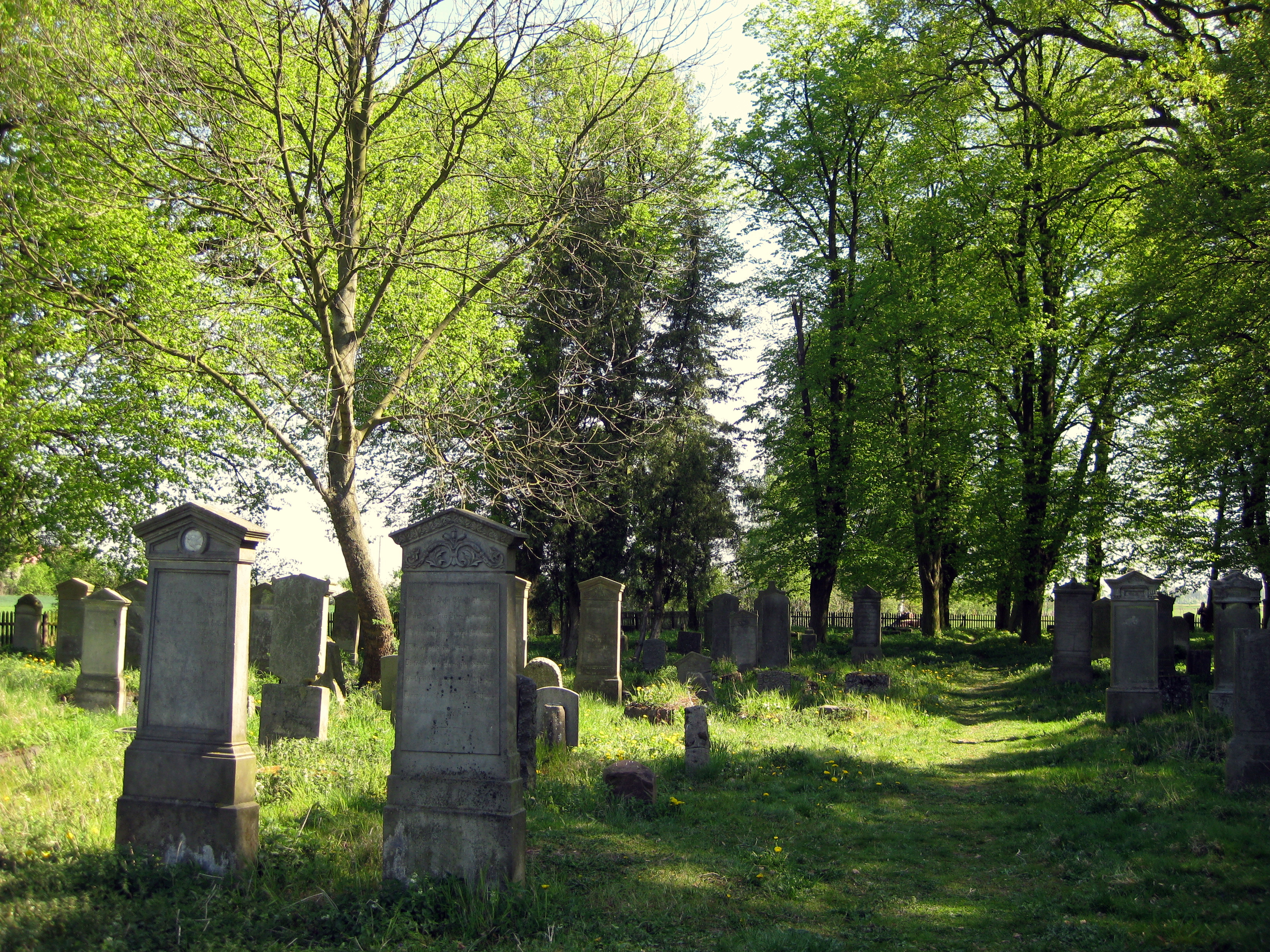
Mennonite graveyard

== See also ==
For the history of the region, see History of Pomerania.
