= Northern Low German =

Variety of Low German

Northern Low German (Standard High German: nördliches Niederdeutsch) is a variety of Low German in Germany, distinguished from Southern Low German.

From a structural point of view, a division into Northern and Southern Low German at the border of kept and lost Middle Low German -e would be conceivable.

The concept of East Low German is refuted.

== Varieties and borders ==
The varieties of Northern Low German (in today's Germany) are:

Northern Low German variety	Included dialects	Area (roughly)	Remark
Westniederdeutsch (lit. West Low German)	Westmünsterländisch, Münsterländisch, partly Emsländisch and the dialects of the Grafschaft Bentheim und the Landkreise Cloppenburg und Vechta	South-western Lower Saxony, north-western North Rhine-Westphalia	Westmünsterländisch and Münsterländisch are also classified as part of Westphalian, and Emsländisch as part of Northern Low Saxon.; Not to be confused with West Low German (Westniederdeutsch) which includes Northern Low Saxon, Westphalian, Eastphalian.
Nordniederdeutsch (lit. North Low German)		Schleswig-Holstein, Hamburg, Bremen, northern Lower Saxony	Roughly corresponding to Northern Low Saxon but not with entire Emsländisch
Nordostniederdeutsch (lit. North-East Low German)	Mecklenburgisch-Vorpommersch and Central Pomeranian	Mecklenburg-Vorpommern and north-eastern Brandenburg	
Brandenburgisch		northern part of Brandenburg without the north-east	

In Germany, it borders to Low Franconian, High German and Southern Low German (südliches Niederdeutsch, i.e. Westphalian and Eastphalian).

== Status ==
It is spoken in several states of Germany. In Germany, it is spoken about until the Ruhr area. Nowadays, most people in the area of Northern Low German do not speak this variety. In television in Germany, various varieties of Northern Low German are used. There are items in Northern Low German in daily newspapers.

== Transitional areas ==
There was a transitional area of Eastphalian and Brandenburgisch around Magdeburg. A transitional dialect of Mecklenburgisch-Vorpommersch and Central Pomeranian was spoken around Neubrandenburg. There was a Low German speaking transitional area between North Upper Saxon/South Markish and Brandenburgisch around Storkow, Brandenburg. Another, however High German speaking transitional area between North Upper Saxon/South Markish and Brandenburgisch around Frankfurt (Oder) used to exist. There is or used to exist a minor transitional area of Mecklenburgisch-Vorpommersch and Brandenburgisch. A transitional dialect area of Northern Low Saxon and Mecklenburgisch-Vorpommersch includes or used to include parts of Lübeck. A transitional dialect area of Brandenburgisch and Mecklenburgisch-Vorpommersch includes or used to include Dannenberg (Elbe). A transitional dialect area of Northern Low Saxon and Mecklenburgisch-Vorpommersch includes or used to include Lüneburg. There is or used to be a dialect area transitional to Eastphalian including Wunstorf. There is or used to be an area of transition to Eastphalian North of Celle. A transitional dialect area of Eastphalian and Brandenburgisch is or used to be North of Wolfsburg. Another transitional dialect area of Central Pomeranian and East Pomeranian roughly from Wolin (town) and Szczecin to about the border of the former Province of Posen used to exist. A transitional dialect area of Central Pomeranian and Brandenburgisch including Schwedt used to exist.
