= Eastphalian language =

Low German dialect

Eastphalian
- ostfälsch Platt
- Native to: Germany
- Region: Lower Saxony, Saxony-Anhalt
- Language family: Indo-European: Germanic; West Germanic; North Sea Germanic; Low German; West Low German; Eastphalian

Language codes
- ISO 639-3: None (mis)
- Glottolog: east2290
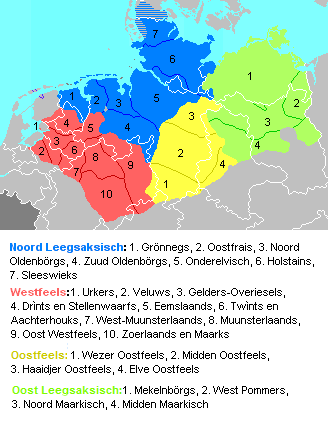
- Eastphalian in yellow within the Low German language area after 1945

Eastphalian, or Eastfalian (German: Ostfälisch, Eastphalian and Low Saxon: ostfälsch Platt), is a Low German language spoken in southeastern parts of Lower Saxony and western parts of Saxony-Anhalt in Germany.

== Geographical extent ==
The language area between the Weser and Elbe rivers stretches from the Lüneburg Heath in the north to the Harz mountain range and Weser Uplands in the south. It comprises the Hanover Region, Brunswick and Calenberg Land as well as the Magdeburg Börde, including the cities of Hanover, Braunschweig, Hildesheim, Göttingen and Magdeburg. It roughly corresponds with the historic region of Eastphalia.

== Classification ==
Eastphalian as a separate dialect was determined by 19th century linguistics, tracing it back to Old Saxon variants spoken in eastern parts of the medieval stem duchy of Saxony. Towards the Elbe region in the southeast, the language area is increasingly influenced by the High German consonant shift.

== Features ==
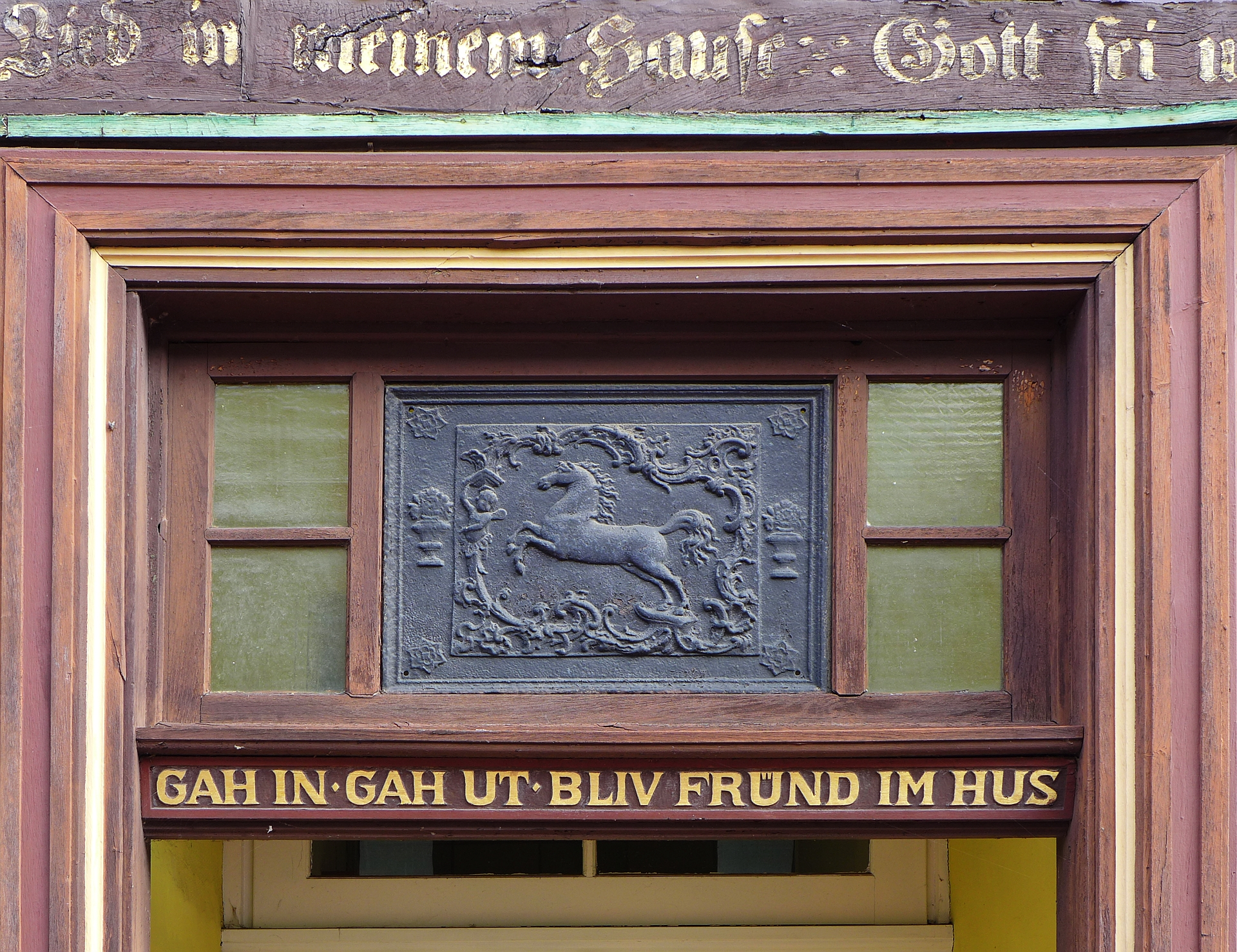
Eastphalian inscription in Wittingen, Gah in, gah ut, bliv fründ im hus. (lit. 'Go in, go out, stay a friend in the house'; in standard German Geh ein, geh aus, bleib Freund im Haus)

The most prominent characteristic in Eastphalian is the object pronouns mek and dek in contrast to mi and di in Northern Lower Saxon, respectively for High German mir and mich resp. dir and dich), as well as öhne, ösch/össek and jöck (Northern Low German em, u[n]s, jo [ju], High German ihm/ihn, uns, euch). Although Eastphalian agrees with many Low German dialects (with exceptions, e.g., in southern Westphalian) in that the dative has coincided with the accusative in the forms mentioned, its peculiarity is shown by the fact that the accusative has prevailed over the dative in all of these forms (in Northern Low Saxon it is the other way around). In Eastphalian, an accusative of the first person plural has been preserved with the form üsch and southern Eastphalian össek (cf. Old High German unsih, Old English ūsic [besides ūs], also High Alemannic üs, südbairisch ins in Upper German).

Much like in most Dutch Low Saxon variants, the e-apocope, i.e. the omission of the -e at the end of the word, as took place in North Lower Saxon, was entirely absent in Eastphalian. Thus, the ablaut -e in words like Sprake (language, speech) and Wiele (while) remains and is not dropped. Furthermore, the -e is also preserved in nouns in the nominative case, where High German no longer has them either, such as in Harte (heart), Frue (woman), Herre (man), Bäre (bear). The same is true for many adjectives, such as dicke (fat, thick) and wisse (clear, fast; cf. German gewiss) and substantivizing endings such as -unge and -nisse, as well as for the older form -ig(e) ['ɪjə]/ ['ɪç], which developed from Middle Low German -inge. The -e ending has also survived for nouns in the dative case. Thus, for example, uppen Felle (on the field).

Another feature of Eastphalian is the residual preservation of the prefix ge- as e- in the participle II (past participle) of verbs; since this prefix has also been lost in the very Northern regions of Eastphalia, e. g., for example, in Celle its wään ("been") is opposed to southern ewää(se)n [əˈvɛː(z)n̩], or ewest [əˈvɛst]. However, this prefix is dropped if the previous word already ends in a schwa like -e or -er. Again, this is very similar to most Dutch Low Saxon varieties classified as Westfalian.

Another striking difference between Eastphalian and all other Low German dialects is the absence (or undoing) of vowel lengthening in open syllable before -el, -en, -er in the following syllable, e. g. Eastphalian Löppel [ˈlœpl̩], betten [ˈbɛtn̩], Pepper [ˈpɛpɐ] ("spoon, bit, pepper") versus Northern Low Saxon Läpel [ˈlɛːpl̩], bäten [ˈbɛːtn̩], Päper [ˈpɛːpɐ].

Eastphalian also takes its own position in equalizing Old Saxon phonetic positions, especially in reducing vowels distinguished in open syllables, by simplifying more than Westphalian (which has no reduction in its southern dialects), but not going as far as the core area of Northern Lower Saxon (where only three of the original eight vowel phonemes remain). Despite the diversity of the sounds in detail, most of the Eastphalian dialects thus have a common sound system. (In this case, besides the Heide-Eastphalian the Göttingisch-Grubenhagen-Eastphalian - which in this case is in the same position as the East-Westphalian - is left out).

Another thing to mention is that prepositions in most of Eastphalian do not contain an umlaut. These include for [ˈfɔr], unner [ˈʊnər] and over (Hildesheim) [ˈɛo̯vər], as opposed to Northern Lower Saxon för, ünner and över.

== Subdivisions ==
- Elbe Eastphalian (around Oschersleben and Haldensleben in the Magdeburg Börde between Helmstedt and Magdeburg)
- Göttingisch-Grubenhagensch (around Göttingen, Northeim and Osterode am Harz)
- Heide Eastphalian (around Celle, with Northern Low Saxon elements)
- Central Eastphalian is the Eastphalian subdialect spoken in a large area surrounding Braunschweig and Hanover.
  - Hildesheimsch (from around Hildesheim and Peine up to Braunschweig)
  - Hannoversch (in the city of Hannover)
  - Calenbergsch (west of Hannover)
  - Einbecksch (around Einbeck)
  - Bronswieksch (in the city of Braunschweig)
