= High Prussian dialect =

Group of East Central German dialects in former East Prussia

High Prussian
- Hochpreußisch (Breslau(i)sch / Oberländisch)
- Native to: Poland, Germany
- Region: historically Ermland, but also parts of West and East Prussia; today moribund and spoken among some Heimatvertriebene in Germany that were expelled after 1945
- Language family: Indo-European: Germanic; West Germanic; High German; Central German; East Central German; High Prussian
- Early forms: Proto-Indo-European: Proto-Germanic; Old Thuringian

Language codes
- ISO 639-3: –
- Glottolog: high1271

High Prussian (German: Hochpreußisch) is a group of East Central German dialects in former East Prussia, in present-day Warmian-Masurian Voivodeship (Poland) and Kaliningrad Oblast (Russia). High Prussian developed in the 13th–15th centuries, brought in by German settlers mainly from Silesia and Thuringia, and was influenced by the Baltic Old Prussian language.

== Classification ==
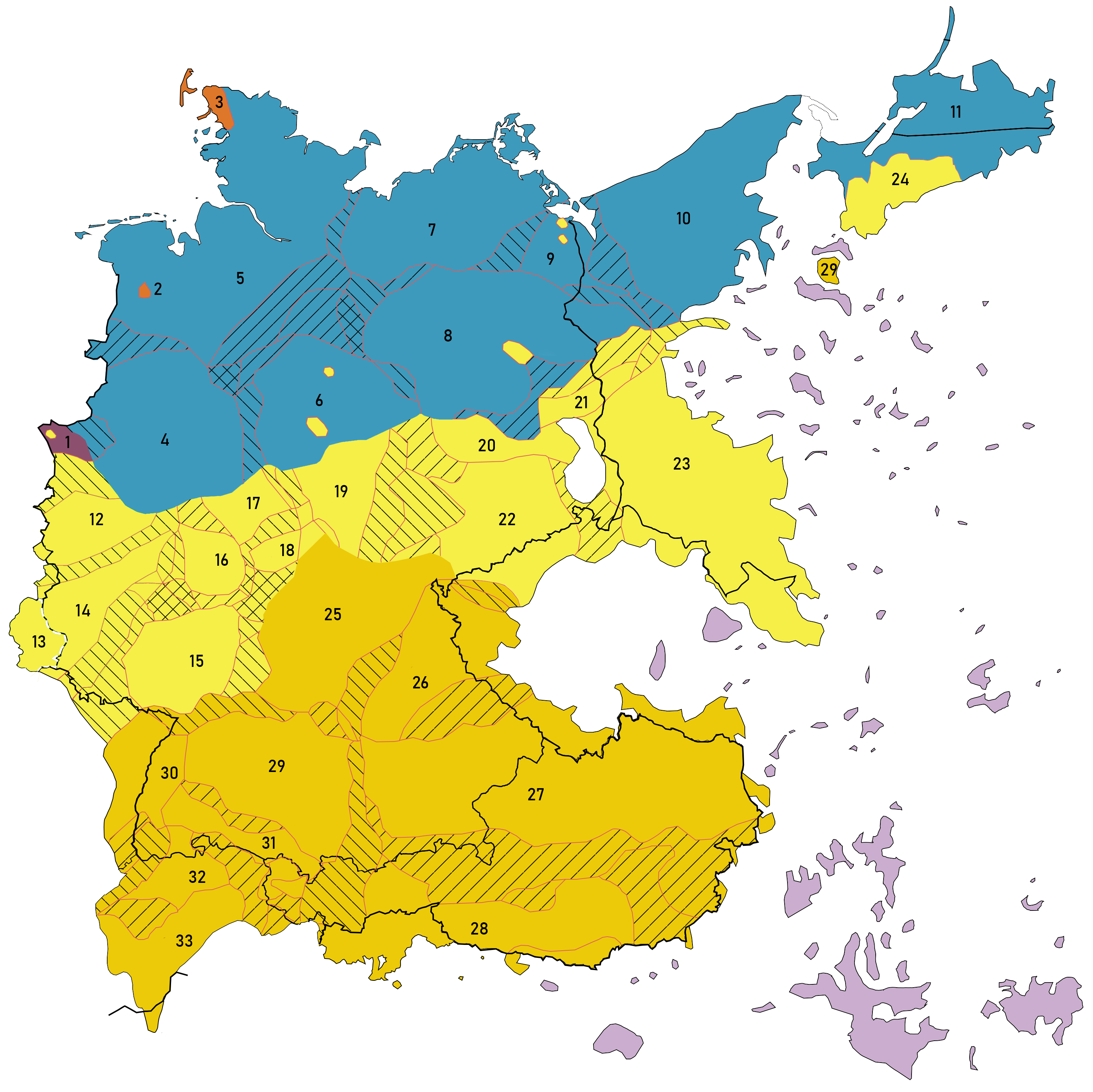
German dialects in 1910. High Prussian (Hochpreußisch) is number 24 on the map.

High Prussian is a Central German dialect formally spoken in Prussia. It is separated from its only adjacent German dialect, Low Prussian, by the Benrath line and the Uerdingen line, the latter dialect being Low German. This was once one of the, if not the hardest linguistic border within the German dialects.

It shares some features with Low Prussian, differentiating it from other Central German dialects east of the Germersheim line.

Those Borussisms are:

- Loss of -n in infinitives (mache for Standard German machen, "to make");
- retention of the prefix ge- in the participe perfect passive (compare Low German from Mecklenburg hei is lopen to High Prussian he is jelopen) (This is common in Central and High German, but rare in Low German);
- overly open pronunciation of /ɛ/ (schnall, Ack - schnell ("fast"), Eck ("corner"))
- delabialization (Kenig, Brieder, Freide, Kreiter - König ("king"), Brüder ("brothers"), Freude ("joy"), Kräuter ("weed"));
- nuscht instead of Standard German nichts ("nothing"); and
- preference for diminutive suffixes (kommche, duche, Briefchedräger, and Low Prussian de lewe Gottke - kommen ("to come"), du ("you"), Briefträger ("post man"), der liebe Gott ("dear God")) - and diminutives without umlaut (Hundchen, Katzchen, Mutterchen - Hündchen ("small dog"), Kätzchen ("small cat/ kitten") Mütterchen ("mother/ elderly woman")).

== History ==
=== Origin of the dialect ===
J. A. Lilienthal, a teacher from Braunsberg, first recorded the term "Breslauisch" for High Prussian as an endonym in Warmia in 1842. Thereafter, it was considered obvious that Warmia was settled by Silesians, who brought their dialect with them. Based on a comparison of toponymy, at least for Oberländer, Thuringia was seen as a potential origin, too. The prevailing assumption was that the upper class emigrating to Prussia, most of which is known have come from Thuringia, would have brought their peasants with them. Walther Mitzka disputed this insisting on using linguistic criteria only. He determined that High Prussian deviated from the Silesian characteristics recognized as such in linguistics, leading him to conclusion that High Prussian could not be of Silesian origin. Instead, within the East Central German dialects, he found the greatest linguistic affinity with the dialects of Lower Lusatia, the core of which lay between Lübben in the west and Guben in the east. Based on those findings, Mitzka developed the theory that Central German settlers, whose arrival can be precisely determined by numerous tangible facts, left Mark Lausitz between 1290 and 1330, when political turmoils made settling in Prussia appear more attractive.

Erhard Riemann tested Mitzka's theory using further toponymy and concluded that the material was not sufficient to allow a reliable location of the origin of High Prussian. While the spread of words like brüh ("hot") and Mache ("girl) would lead to the conclusion of High Prussian being of Silesian origin, other words contradict it. These lead to different regional dialects in Eastern Central Germany or to even wider spread among the dialects of Central German. According to Riemann, we must therefore reckon with a stronger mixture of origins of the settlers and, when deriving Breslau, we should be satisfied with the statement that its origin lies somewhere in a very large area in East Central German, within which Lower Silesia and Lower Lusatia may have formed focal points.

=== Fate after 1945 ===
Almost all High Prussian speakers were evacuated or expelled from Prussia after 1945. Since the expellees scattered throughout Western Germany (with some exceptions, like the Ermländer settlement on a former military training area in Heckenbach/Eifel) the dialects are now moribund. Most of the High Prussian speakers not expelled after World War II relocated from Poland to Western Germany in the 1970s and 1980s as so-called late repatriates (Spätaussiedler). Today, the language is almost extinct, as its use is restricted to communication within the family and gatherings of expellees, where they are spoken out of nostalgia. In Poland, the language of the few non-displaced people was subjected to severe repression after 1945, which meant that the active use of the language was even lower than in Germany. In both countries, the High Prussian dialects were not transmitted to the next generation, therefore, few elderly speakers remain. The German minority in Poland, recognized since 1991, uses Standard German.

== Subdialects ==
Subdialects of High Prussian are:

- Breslau(i)sch, or Ermländisch, in the east
- Oberländisch, in the west
  - Rosenbergisch

== Geographic distribution ==
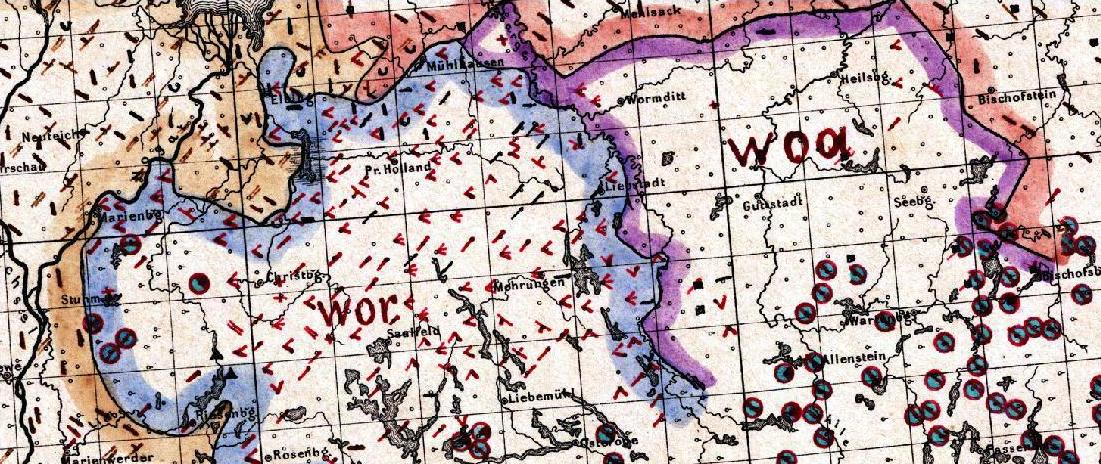
The Isogloss wor - woa marks the border between Oberländisch (left) and Breslausch (right)

High Prussian dialects were spoken mainly in the Catholic region of Warmia and adjacent East Prussian Oberland region beyond the Passarge River in the west (around Preußisch Holland and Mohrungen), subdivided into Breslau(i)sch (from Silesian Breslau) and Oberländisch. They were separated from the Low Prussian dialect area by the Benrath line isogloss to the west, north and east; to the south they bordered on the Polish Masurian dialect region. The places where Oberländisch was spoken included Marienburg, Preußisch Holland, Freystadt and Deutsch Eylau.

== Breslauisch ==
=== Geographic distribution ===
Breslauisch (also: Breslausch, Ermländisch) was mainly spoken in between the cities of Wormditt, Heilsberg, Bischofsburg and Allenstein. This area is almost identical to the portion of the former Prince-Bishopric of Ermland governed by the bishop, which settled it with Central German peasants. The northern part was settled with Low German speakers by the cathedral chapter.

=== Phonology ===
Linguistic features in consonantism are:

- The prefix //er-// appears as [dəɐ] (dəɐfrīzə - erfrieren ("freeze to death"));
- /b/ in initial position is mostly realized as [b], seldom as [p] (pauəɐ, potəɐ, puš for Standard German Bauer ("farmer"), Butter ("butter"), Busch ("bush")). Intervocalic /b/ is often realizes as [v] (raiwə, īwə, ferwə, kelwəɐ - reiben ("to rub"), üben ("to exercise"), färben ("to dye"), Kälber ("calves")). Before consonants it is normally realized as [f] (ārfs, hōfk - Erbse ("pea"), Habicht ("hawk"));
- West Germanic /p/ (Standard German /pf/) is realized as [f] (fefəɐ, fārt, faif - Pfeffer ("pepper"), Pferd ("horse"), Pfeife ("pipe")), only following nasals and geminated it is realized as [p] (damp, zomp, top, klopə - Dampf ("vapor"), Sumpf ("swamp"), Topf ("pan"), klopfen ("to knock"));
- /g/ becomes [j] in the prefix //ge-//, intervocalic and following liquids (jəhālə, morjə - gehalten ("held [past participle of to hold]"), morgen ("tomorrow")). It becomes [g] before front vowels and liquids (gestərə, grisə - gestern ("yesterday"), grüßen ("to greet")). Word initial it is realized as [k] (ken, endəkain - kein ("no [pronoun]"), entgegen ("against"));
- /k/ can be either [c] (kaine, kiŋt - keimen ("to germinate"), Kind ("child")) or [kʰ] (kal, kop - Kalb ("calf"), Kopf ("head"));
- /nt/, /nd/ are mostly realized as /ŋ/ (biŋə, štuiŋ - binden ("to bind"), Stunde ("hour"));
- word final /r/ is realized as [ɐ], sometimes represented as <ř>; and
- /s/ is realized as [ʃ] after [r] (Borscht - Bürste ("brush")).

=== Dialect sample ===
- ""Da ermlängsch Baua on da Taiwel" - Der ermländische Bauer und der Teufel ("The ermlandic peasant and the devil") - A fairy tale
- "Im Ärmland scheint der Maund so grauß." - Im Ermland scheint der Mund so groß ("In the Ermland the mouth appears to be big")

== Oberländisch ==
Oberländisch was mainly spoken in the districts of Preußisch Holland and Mohrungen and in the adjacent area east of the Vistula.

According to popular opinion, the Oberland was settled in the 13th and 14th century by Thuringian peasants. They are said to have brought some of their town names with them (Mohrungen - Mohrungen [nowadays a quarter of Sangerhausen], Saalfeld - Saalfeld, and Mühlhausen - Mühlhausen). In line with Mitzkas theory, the village names merely reflect the origin of the upper classe settled there. Many settlement foundings were done by the patron of the Commendam of Christburg Sieghard von Schwarzburg, who was from Thuringia. For the most part, the German villages in the Oberland were established between 1290 and 1330.

In the Commendam of Christburg, encompassing most of the Oberland, Old Prussians made up half of the inhabitants. Therefore, the Old Prussian language influenced the German dialect of the Oberland (e.g. Old Prussian mergo : Margell ("girl")).

=== Further subdivisions ===
While Breslauisch is a relative homogenous dialect, the Oberländisch dialect is permeated by several isogloss lines, according to Gerog Wenker, who collected data around 1880. He claimed, that this shows a dialect continuum between two extreme forms. He postulates that the dialects of the south west (district of Rosenberg in Western Prussia) were closest to Standard German while those of the north east (district of Preußisch Holland) were closest to Breslauisch. According to him, the dialect of the area surrounding Lauck (in the farthest east of Preußisch Holland) were almost identical to Breslauisch. In his view, the local dialects of Mohrungen we the transition forms.

The last two Wenker sentences (Nr. 39 and 40) should exemplify this:

	Nr. 39: Just go, the brown dog won't hurt you.	Nr. 40: I went to there corn fields over there, behind this meadow, with the folks.
Vogtenthal, Kreis Rosenberg	Geh man, dörr braune Hund titt dör nuscht.	Öch bön met dön Leut do hinten öber de Wös ens Korn gefohre.
Barten (Kreis Mohrungen)	Geh‘ ma, de braune Hund titt dörr nuscht.	Ech sei met de Leit dao hinge eb’r de Wees en’s Korn gefaore.
Borchertsdorf, Kreis Preußisch Holland	Geh man, da braune Hund titt dea nuscht.	Ech sei mete Leut do hinge ewa de Wes ens Koren gefohre.
For comparison: Breslauisch		
Queetz, Kreis Heilsberg	Geh dach, da braun Hungd tit da nuscht.	Ech sei mete Leute do hinge ewa de Wes ens Kohre gefohre.
Standard German	Geh nur, der braune Hund tut dir nichts.	Ich bin mit den Leuten da hinten über die Wiese ins Korn gefahren.

According to Stuhrmann, Mitzka, Ziesemer, Teßmann Oberländisch forms a uniform subdialect. According to Kuck and more recent Szulc the language of the former district of Rosenberg had a special subdialect of High Prussian, which they called Rosenbergisch.

=== Phonology ===
The phonological characteristics mentioned above for Breslauisch do mostly apply to Oberlänisch, too, and are therefore common High Prussian features. The following features are the most prominent ones:

- Oberländisch keeps /b/ in all positions as [b];
- /r/ is realized as [r]; and
- the gutturalization of /nt/ and /nd/ appears word internal only (Kint, Kinger - Kind ("child"), Kinder ("children")).

Teßmann lists the following features as prominent:

- Breslauisch /-ich/ is Oberländisch /-ik/ (common coda of adjectives and numeralia);
- Oberländisch preserves Middle High German /-er-/, while Breslauisch has /-ar-/; and
- the same is true for /ɛ/ becoming /a/ in Breslauisch.

== Regiolect in Elbing ==
A mixture of Oberländisch substrate, or regiolect, was spoken in Elbing. August Schemionek published the following anecdote in 1881, in which the regiolect of Elbing is featured:

Ein Elbinger kommt nach Dresden und frühstückt im Hotel auf seinem Zimmer, wobei ihm der Napf mit Sahne umfällt. Er eilt nach dem Flur, wo er der Schleußerin zuruft: "Trautstes Margellche, öch hoab Mallöhr gehatt, der Schmandtopp es mer umgekäkelt on Salwiött on Teppich eene Gloms. Bring se urschend e Seelader rauffert." Die Schleußerin eilt zum Oberkellner: "Auf Nr. 77 sei ein Ausländer, dem sie kein Wort verstehen könne."

A man from Elbing visits Dresden and has breakfirst in his hotel room, when he spills his milk jug full of cream. He rushes to the hallway, telling the room servie girl: "Dear madam, I have got a situation here, I have spilled cream and now it is splattered all over the napkin and the carpet. Would you please be so kind to bring me a cleaning rag." The girl rushes to the manager: "There is a foreigner in room #77, whom I cannot understand at all."

— August Schemionek, Ausdrücke und Redensarten der Elbingschen Mundart, page 51f.

== See also ==
- German dialects
- Low Prussian
- Masurian dialects

== Literature ==
- Walther Kuck: Dialektgeographische Streifzüge im Hochpreußischen des Oberlandes. In: Teuthonista 4, 1928, Heft 3/4, S. 266 ff.
- Lehmann: Die Volksmundarten in der Provinz Preußen. In: Preußische Provinzialblätter 1842, S. 5–63. Digitalisat
- J. A. Lilienthal: Ein Beitrag zu der Abhandlung „Die Volksmundarten in der Provinz Preußen“ im Januar-Hefte d. J. In: Preußische Provinzialblätter 1842, S. 193–209. Digitalisat.
- Walther Mitzka: Grundzüge nordostdeutscher Sprachgeschichte. Halle (Saale): Niemeyer 1937. Digitalisat.
- Victor Röhrich: Die Besiedlung des Ermlandes mit besonderer Berücksichtigung der Herkunft der Siedler. Braunsberg 1925.
- Aleksander Szulc: Nachträgliches zu Forschungsgeschichte und Lautlehre des Hochpreußischen. In: Peter Ernst und Franz Patocka (Hrsg.): Deutsche Sprache in Raum und Zeit. Wien: Edition Praesens 1998.
- Wilhelm Teßmann: Hochpreußisch und Schlesisch-Böhmisch-Mährisch mit den Sprachinseln des Südostens. Selbstverlag, 1968. Eintrag im Katalog der deutschen Nationalbibliothek.
- Wilhelm Teßmann: Kurze Laut- und Formenlehre des Hochpreußischen (des Oberländischen und des Breslauschen). Würzburg: Holzner 1969 (Jahrbuch der Albertus-Universität zu Königsberg/Preußen. Bd. 19, 1969, S. 115–171). Eintrag im Katalog der deutschen Nationalbibliothek.
- Peter Wiesinger: Phonetisch-phonologische Untersuchungen zur Vokalentwicklung in den deutschen Dialekten. Band 1 und 2. Walter de Gruyter, Berlin 1970 (Studia Linguistica Germanica 2).
- Ewa Żebrowska: Die Äußerungsgliedfolge im Hochpreußischen. Olsztyn : Wydawn. Uniwersytetu Warmińsko-Mazurskiego 2004. ISBN 83-7299-377-7.
- Walther Ziesemer: Die ostpreußischen Mundarten. Proben und Darstellung. Breslau: Hirt 1924. Digitalisat.
- Walther Ziesemer: Die ostpreußischen Mundarten. In: Ostpreußen. Land und Leute in Wort und Bild. Dritte erweiterte Auflage. Königsberg (Preußen): Gräfe und Unzer o. J. [um 1926], S. 78–81.
