= Emigration from Poland to Germany after World War II =

Postwar migration from Poland to Germany

Emigration from Poland to Germany after World War II consisted of several post-1945 movements from Poland to occupied Germany and, after 1949, to East Germany and West Germany. These included the departure of ethnic Germans who remained in Poland after the postwar expulsions, later family reunification migration during the Cold War, and the emigration of ethnic Poles to West Germany during the People's Republic of Poland.

The migrations followed the westward shift of Poland's borders after World War II, when Poland incorporated large territories that had been part of Germany before 1945. Most Germans within Poland's new borders were expelled in the first postwar years; from 1945 to 1950, nearly 3.2 million people were removed. Other inhabitants of the former German territories, especially people classified by Polish authorities as autochthons—including many Silesians, Masurians and Kashubs—were allowed to remain after verification or rehabilitation as Polish citizens.

As the postwar expulsions ended, emigration continued under changing political and legal conditions. A 1950 Polish–East German agreement allowed 76,000 Germans to move to East Germany by the end of 1951. Following the Polish October of 1956, a larger family-reunification wave began; between 231,000 and 260,000 people left Poland for Germany from 1956 to 1959. Additional waves followed in the 1960s and 1970s, including migration connected with Ostpolitik and Polish–West German agreements on family reunification.

During the 1980s, migration from Poland to West Germany also included large numbers of ethnic Poles, many of whom did not speak German. Many left for political or economic reasons during the crisis years of the Polish People's Republic, including the period of martial law and the migration sometimes described as the Solidarity emigration.

== Flight and expulsion of Germans from Poland ==
After 1945, ethnic deportation was used to create a homogeneous nation within the new borders of the People's Republic of Poland (which contained a substantial amount of territory that was once part of Germany). Groups forced to move included ethnic Germans from the Recovered Territories to the post-war Allied Occupation Zones in Germany and ethnic Ukrainians from eastern Poland to the USSR or the Recovered Territories.

The decision to move the Polish border westward was made by the Allies at the Tehran and Yalta Conferences and finalized in the Potsdam Agreement, which also provided for the expulsion of German citizens to Allied occupation zones. Although the Potsdam Agreement left the final decision about the border shift to a future peace treaty, the Polish government (which had implemented pre-Potsdam expulsions from the Oder–Neisse line area) interpreted it as a final decision that would be confirmed by the peace treaty. In reality, the Potsdam Agreement took its place. The status of the expellees in post-war West Germany, which granted the right of return to the German diaspora, was legally defined in the Federal Expellee Law of 1953.

The deportation of Germans ended in 1950; from 1945 to 1950, nearly 3.2 million were removed. After that, authorities stated that there were (at most) a few thousand ethnic Germans living in Poland; these figures included ethnic Germans living among the Mazurians, Silesians and Kashubs. Prime minister Tadeusz Mazowiecki (in office 1989–91) was the first Polish prime minister to officially recognize the German minority.

During the post-war period, the new territories were resettled by Poles. Around 155,000 men from the Kresy (the Polish territories east of the Curzon Line), who were drafted into the Polish army in 1944, were settled in the West after the war. About 2.9 million settlers came from central Poland, and as many as two million had been freed from forced labor in Nazi Germany. 1,176,000 were expelled from former Polish territories in the east; however, an estimated 525,000–1,200,000 Poles remained in those territories after the war.

== Family-reunification process ==
After the Polish Bureau for Repatriation (PUR) declared the expulsion of Germans complete and was dissolved in 1951, official estimates placed the number of remaining Germans at about 130,000. Historian Witold Sienkiewicz analyzed estimates from historians, and concluded that nearly 300,000 Germans lived in Poland at that time. Most, after first wanting to remain in their homeland, later decided to leave Poland and settle in Germany. On 2 January 1950, the governments of Poland and East Germany negotiated a treaty allowing 76,000 Germans to migrate from Poland to East Germany between early 1950 and late 1951.

Later emigrations from Poland to Germany, although formally possible, were impeded by Polish local and national authorities. Many former German citizens willing to settle in West Germany were not allowed to leave Poland until the Polish October of 1956. This event, which marked the decline of Stalinism in Poland, allowed many to leave the country in a family-reunification process.

From 1956 to 1959, between 231,000 and 260,000 people left Poland and settled in Germany (about 80 percent in West Germany). About 250,000 people were allowed to immigrate to Poland from the Soviet Union during repatriations from 1955 to 1959.

Many people who emigrated during the family-reunification process were members of the German minority in Poland or people classified by Polish authorities as autochthons. During the post-war expulsions it was possible for former German citizens who had held Polish citizenship to be "rehabilitated", and for former German citizens of Polish, Kashubian, Masurian or Silesian descent to be verified as autochthons, obtaining Polish citizenship and avoiding expulsion. Some German speakers of Silesian and Masurian were also classified as autochthons by the Polish authorities. Although 1,104,134 people were verified, the number of people who were rehabilitated is unknown. An estimated 160,000 to 200,000 Germans were also allowed to stay in Poland when the expulsion decree of 1946 was partially renounced in 1950. Most emigrants were autochthons, who decided to start a new life in Germany due to cross-border family ties and for economic and political reasons. Émigrés lost their Polish citizenship, and were granted German citizenship on crossing the border (if the person had not been a German citizen).

During the early 1960s immigration to Germany was again impeded by the authorities, leading to a drop in émigrés throughout the 1960s and 1970s. An estimated 22,000 people per year immigrated between 1960 and 1970, 12 to 28 percent of whom came from the recovered territories inhabited by autochthons. During the early 1970s about 67,000 people were leaving Poland annually, 10 to 26 percent from the territories.

West German chancellor Willy Brandt's policy of Ostpolitik led to a rapprochement with Poland, and relations were normalized in the Treaty of Warsaw. Further agreements were reached in 1975, when Polish leader Edward Gierek and West German chancellor Helmut Schmidt met in Helsinki during the third phase of the Conference on Security and Co-operation in Europe. According to the agreements, 120,000 to 125,000 people could leave Poland in the family-reunification process in exchange for economic aid from West Germany to Poland. More than 230,000 people left Poland, among whom were nearly all remaining autochthons dissatisfied with political and economic conditions in Poland. Many, especially if they were born after 1945, were unable to speak German; at home they spoke their regional dialect, and at school they were taught Polish and Russian. Those emigrants were usually manual laborers, farmers and craftsmen, most without higher education. After arriving in Germany, they usually cultivated their regional traditions and language. Some of them retained Polish citizenship and played an active role in the Polish organisations in Germany. In the long run, however, most assimilated into German society.

The 1980s, the last decade of the Polish People's Republic, saw nearly 740,000 people leave Poland overall due to the implementation of martial law and a stagnant economy affected by the economic sanctions imposed by the US under Ronald Reagan. Among those who settled in West Germany, emigrants were primarily ethnic Poles, most of whom did not know German and had to learn it in language courses organised by German authorities. Most maintained close contact with relatives and friends in Poland; some retained Polish citizenship, and most are active in Polish organisations in Germany.

== Other emigrants ==
In addition to former German citizens, their descendants and family members (usually from the marriage of an autochthon and non-autochthon) and other Polish citizens also emigrated to Germany after World War II in numbers difficult to estimate. During the 1980s, about 300,000 Poles left Poland (usually illegally) and settled in West Germany. Although many were political emigrants, others emigrated for economic reasons. This "Solidarity emigration" involved a large number of people with secondary and higher education. They are characterised by deep national pride, and actively participate in Polish cultural and political life in Germany; however, few returned to Poland after the fall of communism in 1989.

== See also ==
- Poles in Germany
- Warmiaks
