= Lubawa dialect =

Dialect of Polish spoken in Poland

- Native to: Poland
- Region: Lubawa
- Language family: Indo-European: Balto-Slavic; Slavic; West Slavic; Lechitic; Polish; Masovian; Lubawa dialect

Language codes
- ISO 639-3: –

The Lubawa dialect (Polish: gwara lubawska) belongs to the Masovian dialect group and is located in the part of Poland. It borders the Ostróda dialect to the northeast, the Masurian dialects to the east, the Greater Polish Chełmno-Dobrzyń dialect to the south and west, and the new mixed dialects to the north.

Lubawska is part of the so-called “new mixed dialects” and is the result of Greater Polish and Masovian colonization. Due to its position, Lubawska has features characteristic of Masovian, Kashubian, Greater Polish, and more specifically Kocievian dialects, with some influence from German. Other dialects also belonging to the new mixed dialect group are Ostróda, Malborg, Warmia, as well as Kociewie. Due this diversity, Lubawska has sometimes been classified as Greater Polish and sometimes as Masovian, or also often as a transitional dialect. However, more Masovian traits are present here. The state of the dialect is relatively strong, and many traits are retained, as opposed to influenced by Standard Polish.

== Phonology ==
Typical of Masovian dialects, devoicing of word-final consonants before vowels and liquids is present here. However, before clitics, both voicing and devoicing is present. Atypical of Masovian dialects but typical of Greater Polish dialects is the absence of mazuration. However, sziakanie is present: sz’edż’ecz’ (siedzieć). A few other changes in the realizations of sibilants are present, but sporadic.

=== Vowels ===
Proto-Slavic *ьl developed into oł here: wołna (wełna), and *ьr developed into ar: ziarko. As in other Masovian dialects, y often merges with i, leaving the hardness of previous consonant as fully phonemi: s-in (syn). The common Masovian shift of ra- > re- is present, but non-shifted forms exist alongside as well: redło, radło (radło). This occurs more often before nasals, which is more typical of Greater Polish and more specifically north-eastern Masovian dialects: reno (rano). Similarly, initial ja- often shifts to je-: jermark (jarmark). This also results in hypercorrections: jażyna (jeżyna). Atypical of Masovian dialects, a shift of final -aj > -ej is not present: tutaj (tutaj). Ablaut is sometimes absent here: wietrak (wiatrak).

==== Slanted vowels ====
Slanted á is retained as á: tráwa. aN also raises to áN: barán. Regionally á may sporadically merge with o before nasals: baron. Word finally it is sometimes clear -a. Slanted ó has characteristically merged with o: woz (wóz), gora (góra), or sometimes retained as ó. Slanted é is retained as é: rzéka (rzeka).

==== Nasal vowels ====
Nasality of ą and ę before sonorants is retained. Final -ą can denasalize to -o and sometimes further raise to -u: ido, idu (idą).

==== Prothesis ====
Prothetic j sometimes occurs before initial i-: jigła (igła). Notably, labialization of o is absent, but initial u- often labializes to û: obok (obok), ûdi (udy).

=== Consonants ===
Typical of Masovian dialects is the hardening of k and g: cuker (cukier), rogy (rogi); as well as the softening of ch: chiba (chyba). Also typical of Masovian dialects is the decomposition of soft labials: f’ > fś, fch, fj: parafisija (parafia), ofxiara, ofjara (ofiara); p’ > pj, pch: pjana, px’ana (piana); b’ > bj, bch: bjała, bx’ała (biała); m’ > mń: mnięso (mięso). This trait is fading somewhat. This can sporadically result in hypercorrections: kołmiesz (kołnierz). The cluster chf is often changed to kf: kwila (chwila), and kt usually changes to cht: chto (kto), tracht (trakt). rz may change to rsz: na wierszchu (na wierzchu). Typical of Masovian dialects, the group kk changes to tk: mietke (miękkie). A few words show rź instead of źr: rźódło (źródło). Many devoiced consonants become voiced: glizda (glista). An epenthetic l is retained from Proto-Slavic in some words: grable (grabię), grablisko (grabisko), a feature shared with Ostródzka. A few sporadic changes of j, ń > l are also recorded: leleń (jeleń), jagle (jagnię).

=== Contraction ===
Verbs usually appear in uncontracted forms: bojał się (bał się).

== Inflection ==
Many typical Masovian inflectional traits can be found here.

=== Nouns ===
As in the Ostróda dialect, the masculine dative singular of soft-stem nouns is usually -ewju through contamination of old -ewi (now -owi) + -u: koniewju (koniowi). There is a preference for -a in the masculine genitive singular over -u: do woza (do wozu). The archaic instrumental plural -y can sometimes be found: przede zniwy (przede żniwami).

=== Prepositions and prefixes ===
Often e is inserted between certain consonants clusters: we wozie (w wozie), ze ziemi (z ziemi).

== Vocabulary ==
=== Word-Formation ===
Many typical Masovian word-formation traits can be found here.

==== Nouns ====
Terms for young and animals and people are formed with the typical Masovian ending -ak (diminutive -aczek).

== Syntax ==
Masculine personal nouns are often instead masculine animal nouns: adwokaty (adwokaci).

== See also ==
- Dialects of the Polish language
- Languages of Europe
- Polish language

== Bibliography ==
- Karaś, Halina (2010). "Lubawskie". dialektologia.uw.edu.pl.
- Kozłowska, Iwona (2010). "Zakres zmian fonotecznych we współczesnej gwarze lubawskiej". Prace Językoznawcze (in Polish) (12, 115–122). Warsaw: Muzeum Historii Polski.
