= Southern dialect =

Many languages have a southern dialect, sometimes more than one. This page does not list all possible southern dialects; you may have better luck looking up the language in question. See also Category:Languages.

- Amami
- There are at least two southern dialects of English:
  - Southern American English
  - Southern English of England
- Welsh
- Southern dialect of the New Mixed Dialects of Polish
