= Warmian dialect =

Subdialect of the Polish language

Warmian
- warnijsko godka
- Native to: Poland
- Region: Warmian-Masurian Voivodeship
- Ethnicity: Warmians
- Language family: Indo-European: Balto-Slavic; Slavic; West Slavic; Lechitic; Polish; Masovian; Warmian
- Writing system: Latin (Polish alphabet)

Language codes
- ISO 639-3: –
- Glottolog: None
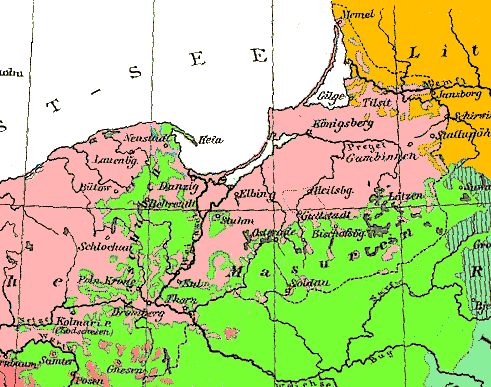
- Linguistic map of East Prussia in 1880, with areas with German majority shown in red, and with Polish (Warmian) majority in green.

The Warmian dialect (Warmian: warnijsko godka; Polish: gwara warmińska) is a dialect of the Polish language, present in the historical region of Warmia, in Warmian-Masurian Voivodeship, Poland. It is spoken by Warmians. It is commonly regarded as a part of the Masovian dialect group, and sometimes alternatively as a part of Greater Poland dialect group. It borders the Ostróda dialect to the west, the Masurian dialects to the south, and the new mixed dialects to the east and north.

It developed in the 14th century, after Polish speakers who settled in the area. It formed from various dialects of the settlers and was shaped by the literary version of Polish language used in religious literature. Since the 19th century, the subdialect began adopting loanwords from German, due to the Germanisation of the area. It is said Mary spoke in the dialect during the apparitions in Gietrzwałd.

== Phonology ==
Typical of Masovian dialects, devoicing of word-final consonants before vowels and liquids is present here. Atypical of Masovian dialects is the absence of mazuration. Sporadic masuration can be found amongst some speakers as a result of Masurian influence: pietruska (pietruszka). More common here instead is jabłonkowanie: ciaszka (czaszka), ciasam (czasem), with much variation, especially for cz, sz. However, most common is a realization that of Standard Polish. Similarly, ś, ź, ć, and dź may be realized in many ways. Most commonly they are realized as in Standard Polish: siano (siano); they may sometimes harden to szi, żi, czi, and dżi or sz, ż, cz: sziano, szano (siano), and dż, or least commonly kaszubienie may occur: sano (siano). These changes are usually in the north and are likely the result of German influence.

=== Vowels ===
The shift of initial ja-, ra- > je-, re- is present but limited to particular words: jek (jak), reno (rano). Medial -ar- shifts to -er-: rozwer: (rozwarł), w mercu (w marcu), ôsiera (ofiara). Ablaut is often levelled: wietrak (wiatrak). Final -ej shifts to -y/-i: dali (dalej). Often y merges with i: pisk (pysk), or with u before ł: buł ‘był’, buła (była). Mobile -e- sometimes disappears in nouns formed with -ek, -ec, especially in the genitive of place names: podwieczórk (podwieczorek), do Mikołajk (do Mikołajek).

==== Slanted vowels ====
Slanted á may be retained as á or sometimes raised to o. Slanted é may sometimes be retained as é, or may either lower and merge with e or raise and merge with y. Slanted ó may sometimes be retained as ó, or may either lower and merge with o or raise and merge with u.

==== Nasal vowels ====
Medial nasal vowels may raise: dziesiunti (dziesiąty), gorónce (gorące), gynsi (gęsi). Medial and final ę may also lower: bandzie (będzie). na tu łolsztyńsko droga (na tę olsztyńską drogę). Nasal vowels decompose before non-sibilants word-medially. Before sibilants, nasality may be retained, or denasalization may occur: gęś, geś (gęś), wąs, wos (wąs), sometimes with -j: gajsi (gęsi), wojsi (wąsy). Word-finally and also before l, ł, both nasal vowels denasalize and often raise: wode (wodę), spsieywajo (śpiewają), nie chcu (nie chcą). Similarly, eN may lower: ciamno (ciemno), as well as iN/yN: jenaczyj (inaczej), gościeniec (gościniec), and oN may raise: czerwónam (czerwonym).

==== Prothesis ====
Initial i- often has a prothetic j-, and can then sometimes lower: jimię (imię), jenaczyj (inaczej). Initial o- typically labializes to ô, as does u- to û- to a lesser extent.

=== Consonants ===
Soft labials decompose: wzino (wino), psiwo (piwo); around Olsztyn m’ shifts to mń: mniasto (miasto); but around Reszel to mn: mnasto (miasto); rarely to ń. f’, w’ may lose all labial elements: zidzioł (widział), przytrasiuło (przytrafiło), and the result sibilant can sometimes harden: psziwo (piwo), bżiały (biały); pszana (piana), bżały (biały). Other types of decomposition occur but are less common: pjes, pchies (pies) bhiały (biały). Decomposition can also occur word-finally: jedwabś (jedwab), szczaś (szczaw). Soft palatals may also sporadically harden, especially around Reszel, probably due to German influence: peśń (pieśń); or due to a more relaxed pronunciation: wyberam (wybieram).

=== Contraction ===
Verbs tend to appear in uncontracted forms here: stojać (stać). św’, ćw’ i dźw’ harden: śwecie (świecie), ćwerć (ćwierć), dźwyrzów (drzwi). Fricative rz is retained by some speakers; however by the early 20th century it was already rare and present mostly among older speakers, and today is nearly non-existent, with rz generally being pronounced as in Standard Polish. li sometimes hardens: lypa (lipa). kie, gie, ki, and gi sometimes harden: łokeć (łokieć), robaky (robaki), but generally are pronounced as in Standard Polish, with a soft pronunciation occurring more before kie than ki, but a hard pronunciation of gi. Sometimes denasalized final -ę also softens: matkie (matkę). ch is generally hard, but sometimes softens: głuchi (głuchy), alongside głuchy. kt typically shifts to cht: chto (kto). k also frequently weakens to kᶜʰ: belkᶜʰi (belki), kᶜʰapa (kapa), takᶜʰ (tak).

== Inflection ==
Typical Masovian inflectional traits are common here.

=== Nouns ===
The masculine dative singular is usually formed with -oziu (rarely -owiu) via contamination between -owi and -u: bratowiu//bratoziu (bratu). In the north-west -ozi occurs more often: chłopozi (chłopu). The accusative singular of feminine nouns ending in -a is equivalent to the nominative singular, as nasal -ę often lowers and denasalizes: spsiół nogawka (spiął nogawkę). Masculine and neuter nouns ending in sz, ż sometimes take -e instead of -u in the locative singular: o kosie (o koszu). -ów is used as a genitive plural ending regardless of gender or the hardness of a given noun: nauczycielów (nauczycieli). The dative plural is usually -ám/-am instead of -om: ludziám (ludziom). The instrumental plural ending may sometimes harden: rękamy (rękami) alongside rękami. Alongside the hardened -amy, -óma (less frequently -oma), from the old dual instrumental, occurs: słowoma/słowóma (słowami).

=== Adjectives, adverbs, pronouns, and numerals ===
Dual forms of pronouns are retained: łu noju (u nas), noma (nam), u woju (u was).

=== Verbs ===
Some past tense verbs have -er- instead of -ar- due to sound changes. The past tense may also be formed with -uł instead of -ył/-ił also as a result of sound changes. The first person plural present tense of verbs is typically -my of Standard Polish: chodzimy (chodzimy); sometimes -m: żniwujam (żniwujemy); or sometimes the old dual ending -wa: chodziwa (chodzimy). The first person plural imperative is typically -my of Standard Polish: choćmy (chodźmy); or sometimes the old dual ending -wa: chodziwa. The first person plural past tense is typically -śmy of Standard Polish: chodziliśmy; sometimes -m: poślim (poszliśmy); or sometimes the old dual ending -wa: chodziliśwa (chodziliśmy). The second person plural past tense is typically -ta: niesieta (niesiecie). -cie is typically used for respect or older people: Siądźcie, babciu. The first person conditional may formed with -bych, from the old aorist: robziułbich (robiłbym). Masculine personal nouns are generally declined as masculine animal nouns: te dobre chłopy (ci dobrzy chłopi), but virile agreement is used with verbs: te dobre chłopy kosili (ci dobrzy chłopi kosili), te dobre chłopy kosili (ci dobrzy chłopi kosili). Often verbs ending with -eć are raised to -éć: leżéć (leżeć).

== Vocabulary ==
=== Word-Formation ===
Typical Masovian word-forming tendencies are present here.

==== Adjectives, adverbs, pronouns, and numerals ====
The superlative is formed with ná-/no-/náj- instead of naj-.

==== Verbs ====
Verbs ending in -ować end in -uwać: pokazuwać (pokazywać); powyjmuwali (powyjmowali).

== Syntax ==
Often dwa is used for feminine nouns instead of dwie: dwa godziny (dwie godziny). Sometimes numbers above five do not govern the genitive plural. Often bez and przez are used interchangeably with each other.

== See also ==
- Dialects of the Polish language
- Languages of Europe
- Polish language
