= Ostróda dialect =

Dialect of Polish spoken in Poland

- Native to: Poland
- Region: Ostróda
- Language family: Indo-European: Balto-Slavic; Slavic; West Slavic; Lechitic; Polish; Masovian; Ostróda dialect

Language codes
- ISO 639-3: –

The Ostróda dialect (Polish: gwara ostródzka) is a dialect of the Polish language spoken in western Masuria, belonging to the Masovian dialect group. It's considered part of the newer mixed dialects. The dialect borders the Lubawa dialect to the west, the Masurian dialects to the south, the Warmia dialect to the east, and the new mixed dialects to the north.

== Phonology ==
Typical of Masovian dialects, devoicing of word-final consonants before vowels and liquids is present here, including before clitics. Atypical of Masovian dialects but typical of Greater Polish dialects is the absence of masuration. Sporadic masuration can be found amongst some speakers as a result of Masurian influence: pietruska (pietruszka). More common here instead is jabłonkowanie: cziapka (czapka), ciasam (czasem), with much variation, especially for cz, sz. However, most common is a realization that of Standard Polish. Similarly, ś, ź, ć, and dź can be realized in many ways. Most often, they are realized as in Standard Polish: siano (siano). They may also frequently be hardened to szi, żi, czi, and dżi: sziano (siano). Least commonly, kaszubienie may occur: sano (siano). These changes are likely the result of German influence.

=== Vowels ===
Initial ja-, ra- often shifts to je-, re- in specific words: jebłko (jabłko), reno (rano). Medial -ar- shifts to -er-: derł (darł), ter (tarł). Some words have ablaut levelled: zawiesy (zawiasy). Final -ej shifts to -ij/-yj and sometimes further to -i/-y: późnij (później), lepi (lepiej), wjincy (więcej), o dziewjonty (o dziewiątej). y often raises to i, leaving the hardness of the previous consonant as the main phonemic factor: a bili te (a byli te), however, often standard pronunciation is retained. i/y often raise before ł: żuł (żył), robiuł (robił). Mobile -e- sometimes disappears in nouns formed with -ek, -ec, especially in the genitive of place names: podwieczórk (podwieczorek), z Kaliszk (z Kaliszek).

==== Slanted vowels ====
Slanted á is retained here, but is sometimes raised to o. Slanted é is retained here, but sometimes raised to i or y, more commonly after soft consonants. Slanted ó is retained here, but is more often raised to u.

==== Nasal vowels ====
Nasal vowels are generally that of Standard Polish, but are sometimes raised to i/y, u: psiuntyj (piątej), pamińć (pamięć). Word medially nasal vowels usually decompose. Before sibilants, nasality may be retained, or denasalization may occur: gęś, geś (gęś), wąs, wos (wąs). Before l, ł, as well as word-finally, both ę and ą tend to denazalise: wode (wodę), spsiéwajo (śpiewają). oN and eN tend to raise to uN, óN and yN: una (ona), słómo (słomą), potym (potem).

==== Prothesis ====
Initial often has prothetic j-: jimię (imię). Initial o labialiazes to ô, and less commonly initial u to û as well.

=== Consonants ===
In the south and east, soft labials decompose in many ways, e.g.: w’ > wź, (less commonly) wż(i), p’ > pś, (less commonly) pch, (less commonly) psz(i). The pronunciation wż(i) and psz(i) are the result of German influence. In the west, soft labials decompose different: w’ > wj. Soft m’ is realized in two ways, depending on the location. In the west (from Podlejki, Mielno, and Stęmbark) m’ does not change, but in the east it shifts to ń: niasto (miasto), and can sometimes harden: nasto (miasto). The instrumental plural ending -ami may be realized as in Standard Polish, or harden: z listamy (z listami). Alternatively, soft labials may harden, probably as a result of German influence: peśń (pieśń). However, this is sporadic. The clusters św’, ćw’ i dźw’ tend to harden: śwat (świat), ćwerć (ćwierć), dźwerze (dźwierze). Historic final soft consonants also decompose: jedwabś (jedwab), karpś (karp), gołombś (gołąb). ń may also sometimes harden due to German influence: konski (koński). However, this is sporadic. Soft kie and gie are generally retained, and soft ki gi often harden to ky, gy. Hard ch is also usually retained. The group kt usually shifts to cht: nicht (nikt). li may harden to ly sometimes.

=== Contraction ===
Verbs tend to be in uncontracted forms: bo sie bojał (bo się bał).

== Inflection ==
Many typical Masurian inflecetional traits are present here.

=== Nouns ===
The masculine dative singular ending is -owju as a result of contamination of -owi and -u: bratowju (bratu). Masculine and neuter nouns ending in sz, ż sometimes take -e instead of -u in the locative singular: o kosie (o koszu). -ów tends to be used as the genitive plural ending regardless of gender. The dative plural is usually -ám/-am instead of -om: ludziám (ludziom). The old instrumental plural endings -oma (-óma, -uma), -ama can be seen here: nożoma (nożami), rękama, renkoma (rękami).

=== Adjectives, adverbs, pronouns, and numerals ===
The comparative of adverbs as well as the feminine genitive/locative singular of adjectives, pronouns, and numerals may be -ij/-yj or -y/-i as a result of sound changes. The instrumental/locative singular are usually -ém instead of -ym/-im and dative/instrumental plural endings are often -émy instead of -ymi/-imi due to prenasal raising: takiem (takim), wszystkiemi (wszystkimi). In the south, the genitive/locative plural ending of adjectives is -éch instead of -ych/-ich by analogy of -ém: téch dobréch (tych dobrych).

=== Verbs ===
Some past tense verbs have -er- instead of -ar- due to sound changes. The past tense may also be formed with -uł instead of -ył/-ił also as a result of sound changes. The old first person present tense dual end -wa is now the common ending for the first person present plural and imperative: idziewa (idziemy), cytájwa (czytajmy). The past tense may sometimes be formed with or without personal clitics: wiósem (wiozłem), ja słiszał (ja słyszałem). The most common first person plural past tense form is -śmy, but sometimes the archaic -m is used: chodziliśmy (chodziliśmy), bralim (braliśmy). The old first person dual -wa is also sometimes used. The second person present and past tense plural for verbs is -ta: niesieta (niesiecie). -cie is used for older or respected people: siądźcie, babciu.

== Vocabulary ==
Typical Masovian word-formation traits are present here.

=== Word-Formation ===
Typical Masovian word-forming processes are found here.

==== Nouns ====
Nouns denoting young animals and people are formed with -ak.

==== Adjectives, adverbs, pronouns, and numerals ====
The superlative is formed with ná-/náj- instead of naj-.

==== Verbs ====
Often verbs ending with -eć are raised to -yć/-ić (through -éć).

== Syntax ==
Masculine personal nouns are generally declined as masculine animal nouns: te dobre chłopy (ci dobrzy chłopi), but virile agreement is used with verbs: te dobre chłopy kosili (ci dobrzy chłopi kosili), kobjety musieli (kobiety musiały). Often dwa is used for feminine nouns instead of dwie: dwa rodziny (dwie rodziny). Sometimes numbers above five do not govern the genitive plural: trzydzieści siedem hektary (trzydzieści siedem hektarów). Often bez and przez are used interchangeably with each other. German syntax is often calqued here: wódkę miał stoić (wódka stała u niego; German: stehen haben), widzę moją dekę leżeć (widzę, że moja serweta leży; German: ich sehe etwas liegen), dostanie kupić (będzie mógł kupić; German: zu kaufen bekommen), among other syntactical elements. Many phraseologisms are also calqued, or have elements replaced due to calquing.

== See also ==
- Dialects of the Polish language
- Languages of Europe
- Polish language
