= Suwałki dialect =

Dialect of Polish spoken in Poland

- Native to: Poland
- Region: Suwałki
- Language family: Indo-European: Balto-Slavic; Slavic; West Slavic; Lechitic; Polish; Masovian; Suwałki dialect

Language codes
- ISO 639-3: –

The Suwałki dialect (Polish: gwara suwalska) belongs to the Masovian dialect group and is located in the part of Poland. It borders the Podlachia dialect to the south, the Masurian dialects to the west, the Northern Borderlands dialect to the east, and the new mixed dialects to the north.

Given the position of the dialect, some influence from the Northern Borderlands dialect can also be seen here, as well as Baltic, and Belarusian. Suwalszczyzna shares much with Podlasie and Northern Borderlands, particularly eastern varieties. Some typical Masovian traits are missing, such as initial ra- > re- (but teraz (teraz)); no ń > ḿ, and no -ami > -amy. -ta for the second person plural of verbs is also absent. Suwalska in recent years has been being supplanted by Standard Polish; however many initiatives exist to document it.

== Phonology ==
Typical of Masovian dialects, devoicing of word-final consonants before vowels and liquids is present here, including before clitics. Also typical of Masovian dialects is the presence of mazuration, except in parts of the east in Sejny County. Hypercorrection occurs frequently for speakers on this border: pomoczy (pomocy). A few loanwords and fewer native words show siakanie: siosom (szosą). się may rarely attach to the associated verb and be pronounced as part of it as a result of eastern influence: mordowa’li sie, and sometimes the imperative and comparative of adverbs may take final stress: da’waj, póź’niej.

=== Vowels ===
The shift of initial ja- > je- is present: jek (jak). Medial -ar- shifts to -er-: sie uperłam (uparłam się). Many forms appear without ablaut: powieda (powiada). Sometimes unaccented o may shift to a as a result of eastern influence: kałduny (kołduny). Liquids may raise or lower certain vowels: descołka (deszczułka), kónicyny (koniczyny), dzióra (dziura).

==== Slanted vowels ====
Generally slanted á has merged with a, slanted é with e, except a few instances of raising can be seen, particularly before liquids, which tend to raise vowels in many dialects: nie wiycie (nie wiecie), darémnie (daremnie), and slanted ó is generally realized as o: krowka (krówka), zesytow (zeszytów), but many words show unexpected slanted ó.

==== Nasal vowels ====
Medial nasal vowels tend to decompose, including before sibilants, and raise: zbłundził (zbłądził), jénczmień (jęczmień), najwincej (najwięcej). Final -ą and -ę tend to denasalize to -o and -e, as in Podlasie and Northern Borderlands: zasiewajo (zasiewają), taką sprawą (tako sprawo); kartkie (kartkę), sie (się). Final -ył/-ił often shifts to -uł: buł (był).

==== Prothesis ====
Initial o tends to labialize to ô, albeit uncommonly and weakly. The pronouns on, ona, ono may be jon, jona, jono here.

=== Consonants ===
k and g soften before final -ę: kartkie (kartkę). ch softens: chiba (chyba), do Lichienia (do Lichenia). św’, ćw’, dźw’ sporadically harden: śwenconki (swięconki), ćwerciach (ćwierciach), medźwedziuk (medźwiedziuk). Dark ł is sometimes retained as a result of eastern influence. h is pronounced differently than ch as a result of eastern influence: hodowali. Sometimes soft l is retained: bilietu (biletu). ch is sometimes changed to k as a result of Lithuanian influence: kowałam (chowałam). rz is hardened relatively frequently to r as a result of Belarusian influence: rucisz (rzucisz). ń hardens to n before c, s, sz as a result of eastern influence: tancować (tańcować). Some consonants soften more than in Standard Polish. This may be either archaic or eastern influence: ź wiosny (z wiosny), źbierali (zbierali), źjadła (zjadła), płyciaj (płycej). kt generally shifts to cht: chto (kto).

=== Contraction ===
Verbs tend to appear in uncontracted forms: bojał sie (bał się).

== Inflection ==
Typical Masovian word-formation traits are present here, as well as influence from neighboring languages.

=== Nouns ===
The singular dative is formed with -oju via contamination of -owi and -u: ziencioju (zięciu). Some nouns have a gender different than in Standard Polish. len acts as a plurale tantum noun “lny” where in Standard Polish they are tantum singulare likely due to influence from Lithuanian linas, linai. The dative plural is formed with -am instead of Standard Polish -óm: koniam (koniom). There is a preference for -y/-i as the nominative/accusative plural of nouns: ryncy (ręce), łojcy (ojcowie), dziadki (dziadkowie), świni (świnie). Feminine nouns ending in -i are usually extended with -a: gospodynia (gospodyni). -ów is used for the genitive plural regardless of gender.

=== Adjectives, adverbs, pronouns, and numerals ===
Adjectives, pronouns, and numerals take -em in the masculine instrumental/locative singular instead of standard -ym/-im: na tem jednem (na tym jednym). Similarly, they take -ech instead of -ych/-ich in the genitive/locative plural: tech domowych (tych domowych). -ejszy is often used instead of Standard Polish -szy for the comparative of adjectives: rzadszejsza (rzadsza). Numerals take -uch in the genitive plural: nas dwunastuch (nas dwunastu). There is a tendency to not use short forms of pronouns: dam tobie (dam ci).

=== Verbs ===
The first person present/future plural of verbs is formed with -m instead of Standard Polish -my: idziem (idziemy). The first person past is formed with -m instead of Standard Polish -śmy: chodzilim (chodzliśmy). The third person past of verbs takes -eli where in Standard Polish is usually -ali: sie pośmieli (się pośmiali). Prefixed forms of iść often appear without -j-: pudzies (pójdziesz). Sometimes the anterior adverbial participle is used as a past tense form: ojciec niewiele dumawszy: chodź, mówi (ojciec niewiele myślał: chodź, mówi).

== Vocabulary ==
=== Word-Formation ===
Typical Masovian word-formation processes are present here, as well as influence from neighboring languages.

==== Nouns ====
Nouns denoting young animals and people are formed with -ak: dzieciak (dziecko). The suffix -uk is present here, but rare.

==== Adjectives, adverbs, pronouns, and numerals ====
Tam is extended to tamój via analogy to the comparative and superlative of adverbs, but najwięcej is nawięc. który is extended with -en to któren. The emphatic suffix/particle -ci is often retained here as in Belarusian: jekieści. Many adjectives are formed with -owaty to signify a high level of intensity: zdolnowaty (quite capable).

==== Verbs ====
Frequentatives are often formed with -ać instead of -ować: kupajcie i dla mnie (kupujcie mi). Often ob- is used to form verbs where in Standard Polish is o-: obczyściłam (oczyściłam). The past tense may be formed with -uł instead of -ił/-ył due to sound changes. Secondary iteratives are sometimes used: sie scyzuje (się strzyże).

== Syntax ==
Sometimes numbers above five do not govern the genitive plural. Masculine personal nouns are generally declined as masculine animal nouns: te dobre chłopy (ci dobrzy chłopi), but virile agreement is used with verbs: dobre rowery byli (dobre rowery były), te syny byli żonate (ci synowie byli żonaci). As in Northern Borderlands and Podlasie, sometimes dla + genitive is used instead of dative: dla mnie sprzedał (mi sprzedał). There is a tendency for się to appear before a verb, whereas in Standard Polish it's more common to appear after it. Numerals above five might take plural agreement: siedemdziesięciu gospodarzy byli (siedemdziesięciu gospodarzy było).

== See also ==
- Dialects of the Polish language
- Languages of Europe
- Polish language
