= Far Masovian dialect =

Dialect of Polish spoken in Poland

Far Mazovian dialect
- Native to: Poland
- Region: Central Masovia
- Language family: Indo-European: Balto-Slavic; Slavic; West Slavic; Lechitic; Polish; Masovian; Far Mazovian dialect

Language codes
- ISO 639-3: –

The Far Masovian dialect (Polish: gwary Mazowsza dalszego) belongs to the Masovian dialect group and is located in an area just north of the capital of Poland, Warsaw. It borders the Near Mazovian dialect to the south, the Podlachia dialect to the east, the Kurpie dialect and Masurian dialects to the north and the Greater Polish Chełmno-Dobrzyń dialect to the west. Generally, this dialect is fading, and many typical Masovian features are being replaced with Standard Polish features.

== Phonology ==
Typical of Masovian dialects, devoicing of word-final consonants before vowels and liquids is present here, including before clitics. This does not affect prepositions. Also typical of Masovian dialects is the presence of masuration, but it is now a sporadic change, and forms not having undergone masuration are more common. Hypercorrections may also occur.

=== Vowels ===
The shift of initial ja-, ra- > je-, re- is present but limited to particular words: jek (jak), remię (ramię). Often this process is undone, as well. The shift of medial -ar- to -er- is found only in forms of the verbs trzeć, drzeć, żreć, umrzeć, uprzeć się, zaprzeć, zawrzeć and the nouns tartak, tarcica, umarlak, darń. This process is also being undone, particularly in the north. The shift of final -aj to -ej is rare here. Ablaut is sometimes levelled here, but often forms that of Standard Polish are preferred. y sometimes merges with i, but inconsistently, and usually the Standard Polish pronunciation of y is preferred. i can sometimes lower before liquids, but this is generally restricted to certain words. Otherwise, i may merge with y after m or w, especially in the first person dative singular pronoun my (mi), the instrumental plural endings for adjectives, pronouns, and nouns, and some other words: śwynia, gmyna. e may be inserted in certain consonant clusters: wiater.

==== Slanted vowels ====
Slanted á was generally retained as á until at least the 1950s, and could sometimes raise to ó, or u before a nasal, but in recent years is generally realized as a, as in Standard Polish. Slanted é is usually merged with e due to influence from Standard Polish but, in the past, merged with i or y. e often raises to é in words ending in -ej, before final -rz, -r, and voiced consonants. The group irC often shifts to érzC: sierzp. The group éj may shift to i after soft consonants and y after hard consonants: boski (boskiej), dobry (dobrej). Slanted ó may be retained as ó, more frequently merge with u, or rarely merge with o, and o may become ó before nasals, except in the dative plural ending -om, and words ending in -o often shift to -ój.

==== Nasal vowels ====
ę tends to be realized like in Standard Polish: it decomposes medially except before sibilants (with exceptions). Medial ę sometimes lowers, but this is fading, it also sporadically raises to yN or iN, but this is also uncommon. Final -ę generally denasalizes to -e. Medial ą tends to also decompose to oN, and sometimes then rises to óN or uN. Final -ą often denasalizes to -o or sometimes -oł, and sporadically raises to -ó or -u. However, before sonorants, both ę and ą may lose nasality and/or gain j or ł: gęjśor, gołsior (gęsior), cięłżkie (ciężkie), ciełzar (ciężar). They may also sometimes decompose: krawenżnik (krawężnik), dzionsła (dziąsła). The group eN sometimes lowers to aN, or sometimes raises to éN or yN/iN. However, this is a realization of Standard Polish that is becoming more common. The group oN also frequently raises to óN, uN. o may sporadically raise before r in certain words. y may lower to e before m and n, and shifts to ó before rz. u may lower to o before m and n. Sporadic secondary nasalization may occur. Future forms of być often lose nasality.

==== Prothesis ====
Initial i- sometimes takes prothetic j-, but more common are forms without this prothesis. Initial o- may labialize to ô-, but weakly, and this is often avoided, sometimes leading to hypercorrections: okieć (łokieć). Even less frequently, initial u- may also undergo weak labialization to û-. Initial a- may take a prothetic h- or j- and may rarely labialize. Initial e- may gain a prothetic w or j, and words beginning with je- often shift to e-: esce (jeszcze).

=== Consonants ===
Soft labials tend to decompose here, and in various ways. The most common ways is for the palatal element to become stronger and become j, but soft ḿ may become mń, or rarely a palatal consonant may be inserted. The result consonant clusters can then sometimes further reduce: ofiara > ofsiara > osiara; miasto > mniasto > niasto. This final shift is rare here, but hypercorrections can occur: śmjodanie (śniadanie). Similarly, ń may shift to mń initially before e: mnieuk (nieuk). Soft w between vowels often shifts to j: cłojek (człowiek), spojedź (spowiedź). The groups śf’, ćf’, and dźw’ may also harden: śfynie (świnie). However, this change is limited to the word świnia and its derivatives. źw- may shift to dźw-: dźwierzyna (zwierzyna). m may also harden in the instrumental plural ending -ami or -ymi/-imi: wołamy (wołami), takymy (takimi). The group li may harden to ly, but this is rare, and has been rare since after World War II. In the northwest, kie, gie, ki, gi tend to remain soft; elsewhere, they tend to harden: cukerek (cukierek), takymy (takimi). chy may also soften: chiba (chyba). The groups chrz, chw sometimes change to krz, kw or f: krzan (chrzan), kwasty (chwasty), fytać (chwytać). The group kt tends to shift to cht — chto (kto) — and, similarly, kł to chł. The group kk tends to reduce to k: lekki i (lekkie), mjenkie (miękkie). tk may shift to tch. Initial ju-, ja-, and je- often shifts to u-, a-, and e-. Masuration is common in this dialect. Final -ł is often lost in the past tense of verbs whose stems end in a consonant: jad (jadł). d may shift to g before ł or l: mgły (mdły), jeglina (jedlina). rd- shifts to drd-: drdzeń (rdzeń). The clusters kć, kp shift to kść, kśp: kśpić (kpić). śćk is often retained: śćkło (szkło), and śćklep was formed from sklep via analogy to this. Final -z is lost in certain adverbs: tera, zara.

=== Contraction ===
Uncontracted forms often exist and can raise: stojać, postojić.

== Inflection ==
Many typical Masovian inflectional traits can be found here.

=== Nouns ===
Masculine nouns ending in -a take adjectival declension: organista (nom. s.) > organistégo (gen. s.). The genitive singular is often formed with -a instead of -u for masculine nouns. Feminine nouns with ja type stems take -e in the genitive singular: od wiecerze. The masculine dative is formed with -oju via contamination of -owi (reduced to -oji) and -u. The masculine nominative plural is often formed with -y (-i) alongside -oje (from -owie), or -e for jo type stems. The neutral nominative plural is often formed -y (-i). The genitive plural is often formed with -ów regardless of gender, but standard forms can occur. The feminine accusative plural is often formed with -e for all stems, and the instrumental plural is formed with -amy for all genders. Often, slanted é is retained in declensions: paciérz (nom. s.) > paciérza (gen. s.)

=== Adjectives and adverbs ===
The instrumental plural is formed typically with -emi/-emy as well as -oma. The feminine accusative singular may sometimes be formed with -ę, which is realized as -e phonetically. Slanted é was retained in the genitive masculine/neuter singular ending of adjectives and pronouns. Comparatives may also be formed differently, twardziejsy, tniejsy (cieńszy).

=== Verbs ===
The second person singular imperative for -ić (-yj) type verbs is most commonly -ij (-yj) instead of -∅. For the second person plural imperative, -wa and -ta are common alongside -cie. The endings -wa and -ta are also used in the present tense conjugations for the second person plural. -m is preserved over the innovated -my, which is heard rarely, in the first person plural. -śwa and -śta are used in the second person plural past tense, and -m is found in the first person plural past tense instead of -śmy. The past tense may often contain -ół for -ić (-yć) type verbs: kupiół, krół (krył). Infitives ending in -eć often raise to -éć. Verbs ending in -ąć take -on in the past tense — wzion (wziął) — or -en- in other forms — wyjeni (wyjęli). Verbs formed from iść may occur with or without j in declension: póde, pójde. The form jest is usually reduced to je.

== Vocabulary ==
=== Word-Formation ===
Many typical Masovian word-formation traits can be found here.

==== Proper nouns ====
The names of towns are often formed with the ending -owo, -iec, -ice, and -ki. Forest names are often derived from a neighboring village name + -ak, and rivers from the village name + -ka. Minor nobility often takes their name from the village name, and peasant surnames are often formed with -ski, -cki, -ak, and -ek. The surnames of wives are often formed from the husband's surname + -owa for respect, and -ka for familiarity. The surnames of daughters are often formed with -anka from the father's surname. A son's surname is sometimes formed from the father's + -ak.

==== Nouns ====
Nouns are often formed with -ak, especially for young animals and people. -ek is also often used. -aś and -ul are common diminutive endings, especially for names.

==== Adjectives ====
Many adjectives are formed by combining other adjectival suffixes, resulting in the suffixes -alki, -ulki, -ulenki, -ulecki, -achny, -uchny, -urny, -usienki, -utki, -uteńki.

==== Verbs ====
Frequentatives are often formed with -ywać/-iwać, as in robiwać, as well as ać, as in kupać, and ować, as in wypytować. Prefixed forms of iść often retain medial -ń-: wyńść (wyjść). The third person plural past tense often is formed -eli, such as kazeli via analogy to forms such as wiedzieli.

== Syntax ==
Sometimes, a verb can govern a different case than in Standard Polish. co is used as a coordinating conjunction instead of że in subordinate sentences and clauses of result, and can also be used instead of który (alongside chtóren and kozden) as a relative pronoun. bez and przez are often used interchangeably. o, when governing the accusative, can mean za or na: zeby go bór o jeden dzień ścion, pamiętajze o me dzieci.

== See also ==
- Dialects of the Polish language
- Languages of Europe
- Polish language
