= Masurian dialects =

Dialect of Polish spoken in northeastern Poland

Masurian
- mazurská gádkä
- Native to: Poland
- Region: Masuria
- Ethnicity: Masurians
- Native speakers: (undated figure of 5,000–15,000)
- Language family: Indo-European: Balto-Slavic; Slavic; West Slavic; Lechitic; Polish; Masovian; Masurian

Language codes
- ISO 639-3: –
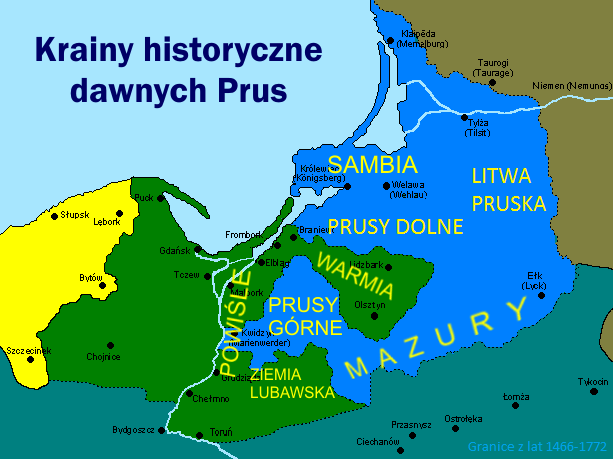
- Historical Prussia – Masuria is captioned as Mazury

The Masurian ethnolect (Masurian: mazurská gádkä; Polish: mazurski; German: Masurisch), according to some linguists, is a dialect group of the Polish language; others consider Masurian to be a separate language, spoken by the Masurian people in northeastern Poland.

The dialect belongs to the Masovian dialect group and is located in the part of Poland as well as parts of Siberia. It borders the Lubawa dialect to the far southwest, the Ostróda dialect and Warmia dialect to the west, the new mixed dialects to the north, the Suwałki dialect to the east, marginally the Podlachia dialect to the far east, and the Kurpie dialect and Far Mazovian dialect to the south.

== History ==
From the 14th century, some settlers from Masovia started to settle in southern Prussia, which had been devastated by the crusades of the Teutonic Knights against the native Old Prussians. According to other sources, people from Masovia did not move to southern Prussia until the time of the Protestant Reformation, Prussia having become Lutheran in 1525. The Masurians were mostly of the Protestant faith, in contrast to the neighboring Roman Catholic people of the Duchy of Masovia, which was incorporated into the Polish kingdom in 1526. A new dialect developed in Prussia, isolated from the remaining Polish language area. The Masurian dialect group has many Low Saxon, German and Old Prussian words mixed in with Polish-language endings.

Beginning in the 1870s, Imperial German officials restricted the usage of languages other than German in Prussia's eastern provinces. While in 1880 Masurians were still treated as Poles by the German Empire, at the turn of century the German authorities undertook several measures to Germanise and separate them from the Polish nation by creating a separate identity. After World War I the East Prussian plebiscite was held on July 11, 1920, according to the Treaty of Versailles, in which the Masurians had to decide whether they wanted to be part of the Second Polish Republic or remain in German East Prussia; about 98% voted for Germany.

By the early 20th century, most Masurians were at least bilingual and could speak Low Saxon and German; in some areas about half of them still spoke Masurian, at least at home. In 1900, according to the German census there were 142,049 Masurians speaking Masurian. In 1925, only 40,869 people gave Masurian as their native language, many considering German their first language, considering Masurian merely as their domestic dialect, By the early 1920s there were also some Masurians who had their separate identity, claiming that Masurians are a nation. Most of them were members of Masurenbund. Their main goal was to grant Masurians some minority laws inside Germany, but there were also some separatists. In the early 1930s, support for the Nazi Party was high in Masuria, especially in elections in 1932 and 1933. Nazi political rallies were organized in the Masurian dialect during the campaigning.

After 1933 the usage of the Masurian dialect was prohibited by the National Socialist authorities. By 1938 most Masurian place and personal names had been changed to "pure" German substitutes. From 1939 on it was forbidden to hold church services in Masurian.

The replacement of Masurian in favor of German was not completed by the time the Soviet Red Army conquered Masurian East Prussia in January 1945, in World War II. The territory was transferred to Poland according to the postwar Potsdam Conference. During the wartime fighting and post-war deportations in the subsequent decades, most Masurian-speakers left Masuria for western Germany, especially to post-war West Germany, where they were quickly assimilated into the German mainstream.

=== Situation in 21st century ===
According to some scientists such as Andrzej Sakson, there are about 5,000–10,000 ethnic Masurians left in Poland. According to the Polish census from 2011, there are only 1,376 of them who identify themselves as Masurians. Most Masurians live in Germany now, but due to the German law the ethnicity and nationality are not determined in their census.

There is a lack of surveys on the knowledge of the ethnolect both in Poland and Germany. However, the elderly can communicate in Masurian with some fluency. The sole group who speak Masurian on a daily basis are the so-called Russian Masurians, who are the descendants of colonists who arrived in Siberia at the end of the 19th century. They have lived in isolation from the other groups, thus they were neither Germanized nor Polonized, although their speech acquired many Russian loanwords.

Nowadays, there are several organizations promoting the dialect. Since 2015, the Sorkwity Masurian Culture Festival started to promote Masurian, locals are starting to create folk music, and some schools are organizing competitions in speaking Masurian. People are also starting to promote the ethnolect via social media. In 2016, the Masurian Union was founded to promote the Masurian ethnolect and culture. Meanwhile, some activists have also started a process of linguistical normalization to promote and save the ethnolect.

In 2016, the online dictionary Glosbe introduced Masurian to their data.

== Books in Masurian ==
The oldest book written in Masurian probably is Ta Swenta Woyna, written by Jakub Szczepan in 1900.

In 2018, The Little Prince by Antoine de Saint Exupéry was translated to Masurian.

== Dialect or language ==
Several scientists consider Masurian to be a separate language in its own right; others argue that Masurian is a dialect of Polish, or even just a subdialect.

== Linguistic features ==
Typical of Masovian dialects, devoicing of word-final consonants before vowels and liquids is present here, including before clitics. Also typical of Masovian dialects is the presence of mazuration, however, younger people tend to use a pronunciation that of Standard Polish, and as such, mazuration is quickly fading. The degree of mazuration can also depend on the given phoneme.

=== Vowels ===
The shift of initial ja-, ra- > je-, re- is present but limited to particular words: jek (jak), reno (rano).

Medial -ar- shifts to -er-: rozwer: (rozwarł), w mercu (w marcu), łosiera (ofiara).

Ablaut is often levelled: wietrak (wiatrak).

Often y merges with i: pisk (pysk).

==== Slanted vowels ====
Slanted á may be retained as á (more common in the central part), or sometimes merge with a (more common in the east), where historic short a often fronts to [æ] and can cause softening of the preceding consonant: matk’æ. Slanted é may sometimes be retained as é, or may either lower and merge with e or raise and merge with y. Slanted ó is usually retained as ó, but may also either lower and merge with o (in the east) or raise and merge with u (elsewhere).

==== Nasal vowels ====
Medial -ę- decomposes to -éɴ- and -ą- to -óɴ- in the east, and nasality is often lost medially in the west. Finally, nasality is loss, giving -e and -o.

==== Prothesis ====
Initial i- often has a prothetic j-, and can then sometimes lower: jimię (imię), jenaczyj (inaczej). This happens most commonly in the north east of Szczytno and Mrągowo.

Initial o- typically labializes, as does u- to a lesser extent.

Soft labials decompose: b’jałi, b’źałi (biały), b’h’ijak (bijak) h and ch appear more commonly in the east and ś and ź in the west, j being rare; m’ shifts to mń: ramńona (ramiona); sometimes ᵐń: ᵐniasto; as well as ń: ńód (miód). Hardening of m also occurs, particularly in German loanwords and the instrumental plural ending -ami: ńemeck’i (niemiecki), nasto (miasto), myck’i (czapki), cepamy (cepami).

św’, ćw’ i dźw’ typically harden: śfat (świat). Soft forms occur more often before front vowels, but not only: śf’at (świat), śf’eće (świecie).

Fricative rz is retained by some speakers; however by the early 20th century it was already rare and present mostly among older speakers, and today is nearly non-existent, with rz generally being pronounced as in Standard Polish.

ń sometimes hardens, typically in the north, as a result of German influence: drewnana studna (drewniana studnia).

kie, gie, ki, and gi generally remain soft, but most people often harden k and g before one of the vowels while keeping them soft before the other, and generally k and g are soft before e more than i: k’edy (kiedy), taky (taki). Hard pronunciations are becoming rarer. A few instances of further palatalization can be heard: flakt’i (flaki), okt’eć (łokieć), mat’era (makiera). k and g may also sometimes palatalize before ę, especially in the east: matk’e (matkę), g’enśi (gęsi). k and g may also soften before a in the east, particularly the northeast; in the west it remains hard: k’apa (kapa). This softening mostly concerns jasne a, and is rare for ká, gá. Most residents had this pronunciation through the 20th century. Also in the east, ch may soften before i, e, ę, and a to chś, ś, or szi: ožeśi (orzechy), štaśety (sztachety), l’iśa (licha), ch’ata (chata). In the west, a hard pronunciation is most common.

=== Consonants ===
cz is most commonly merged with c, but words related to education often have cz, spread through schools. Rarely it may soften to czi or ć. dż is generally realized az dz, but is not a common enough phone to establish statistics. ż and sz show much more fluctuation, due to influence from both Standard Polish as well as German, but also the common presence of the phonemes s, z and ż sz from rz. This confusion with rz can sometimes result in mazuration of rz as well as hypercorrections, which contributes to the loss of mazuration of ż and sz. sz shows more fluctuation than ż. However, mazuration still predominates, with żi being less common and ź being rare.

Fricative rz was very common at the beginning 20th century; by the middle of the 20th century it was still used by some speakers, generally being replaced with ż/sz or rarely r: rec-i (rzeczy).

Similarly, the palatal sibilants ś, ź, ć, dź may be realized in many ways. Sometimes they are the same as in Standard Polish. They may also harden to szi, żi, czi, and dżi, or as sz, ż, cz, dż. Most rarely, they may completely depatalize. ś ź show more fluctuation than ć dź. Palatal pronunciations of ś ź are the most common, except in the north-east where szi, żi are more common. ć and dź more commonly harden in the north due to German influence. Elsewhere, soft realizations are more common.

A few cases of kaszubienie can be found.

== Dialects of Masurian ==
Masurian has three to five dialects:

- Ostróda dialect (Ostróda, Olsztynek) – Denasalization of the nasal vowels ą and ę as o and e – No mazuration – Common á (ɒ, a result from historic long vowels. See Old Polish phonology and Middle Polish phonology for more. – Labialization (ô, û – uo, uu) – Before ł vowels i and y pronounced like u, e.g. buł, zuł (był, żył).
- West-Masurian dialect (Działdowo, Nidzica, Szczytno) – Irregularly occurring á and labialization – Mni where Polish mi (mniasto, kamnień) – As in Ostróda district appear and have dominant position psi, bzi, (w)zi, f(si) to pchi, bhI etc. – Denasalization of the nasal vowels ą and ę as o and e.
- Center-Masurian dialect (Giżycko, Mrągowo, Pisz, Biała Piska) – The most common intermediate á – The most common archaic ř (in Polish sound as rż) – Frequent labialization – Appear and have dominant position pchi, bhI to psi, bzi etc. – Dominate pronunciation ni instead of mni – niasto, kanień etc. - Soft k, g, ch when is before a for example kia, gia, chia – Polish ą i ę like ón, on, én, en.
- East-Masurian dialect (Łek, Ôleck) – Polish ś, ć, ź pronounced like sz, cz, ż (for example spacz, bÿcz) – Á almost does not exist – a is frequently pronounced as a vowel intermediate between a and e (ä – mätkiä [ˈmætkʲæ], as in American English trap) – Synchronous pronunciation of soft labials b', p', f', w' change to bj, pj, fj, wj – Ch change to ś (kosianÿ, siätä) – Less frequent é and ó.
- North-Masurian dialect (Węgorzewo, Gołdap) – in the early 20th century almost disappeared, in the area Węgorzewa known for up to a few percent of the population (in the nineteenth century, more than half), in district of Gołdap 1% (in the nineteenth century, approx. 20%). – Very archaic sound for r – A relatively frequent á.

== Grammar ==
=== Inflectional cases ===
Cases
	Singular	Plural
Nominative	ksiát	ksiátÿ
Genitive	ksiátu/ksiáta	ksiátów
Dative	ksiát|oju, ochiu, oziu	ksiátám
Accusative	ksiát, ksíáta	ksiátÿ
Instrumental	ksiátem	ksiát|ani, amni, ami
Locative	ksiácie	ksiátach
Vocative	ksiácie	ksiátÿ

==== The verb "to be" ====
	Past tense	Present tense		Future tense
Pronouns	Masurian	Masurian	Polish	Masurian
Já	já buł / ém buł / bułém	Em je	Ja jestem	bénde/béde
Tÿ	tÿsź buł / tÿsź buła / esź buł (+a)	Tÿś je	Ty jesteś	béndžes/bédžes
Ón/Óna/Óno	ón buł, óna buła, óno buło/bÿło	Ón/Óna jes	On/Ona jest	béndže/bédže
Mÿ	mÿ bÿli / mÿ bÿlim / mÿ bÿliźwa	Em só/Mÿ jest	My jesteśmy	béndžém/bédžém/bédžewa
Wÿ	wÿ bÿli / wÿ bÿlisźta / (e)sźta bÿli	Wyśta só/Wÿ jeśteśta	Wy jesteście	bédžeta/béndžeta
Óni/Óne	óne/óni bÿli	Óni/Óne só	Oni/One są	bédó/béndo

In the singular it is possible to replace u with ÿ for example: (Já) buł/bÿł, tÿsź buł/bÿł, (Ón) buł/bÿł. It is also possible to create the future perfect tense with the structure be.fut + inf, for example: (Já) Bénde koménderowač.

=== Present tense conjugation ===
==== -ač ====
The conjugation of regular verbs usually ending in -ač, for example znač (to know).

Já	znám
Tÿ	znás
Ón/Óna	zná
Mÿ	znawa
Wÿ	znata
Óni/Óne	znajó

á will shorten to a if the word has more than one syllable. For example:

- dumač – to think (dumam, dumas, dumá, dumawa, dumata, dumajó)
- kupač – to buy (kupam, kupas, kupá, kupawa, kupata, kupajó)

==== -eč ====
The conjugation of regular verbs usually ending in -eč, for example mÿšléč (to think).

Já	mÿšle
Tÿ	mÿšlis
Ón/Óna	mÿšli
Mÿ	mÿšlim/mÿšliwa
Wÿ	mÿšlita
Óni/Óne	mÿšló

==== -ovač ====
The conjugation of regular verbs usually ending in -owač ", for example "koménderowač" (to give an order to someone).

Já	koménderuje
Tÿ	koménderujes
Ón/Óna	koménderuje
Mÿ	koménderujém
Wÿ	koménderujeta
Óni/Óne	koménderujó

=== Conditional ===
Conditional in Masurian
Pronouns	
Já	verb+bÿ/bÿm
Tÿ	verb+bÿsź
Ón/Óna	verb+bÿ
Mÿ	verb+bÿ/bÿm
Wÿ	verb+bÿsźta
Óni/Óne	verb+bÿ

To create the conditional, as in the majority of Slavic languages, the verb root is taken (i.e. verb endings like ač, eč are not considered and the respective ending is added for the conditional mode. For example, znač (to know) → znabÿ (he/she would know).

bÿ in Masurian has also one more function, where it can be placed at the beginning of a sentence to make questions, or also to mean "whether"/"or"/"if". For example, Lejduje ni niénso/niéso, bÿ sźwÿnina, bÿ réntozina (I like meat, whether it [is] pork or beef), which in standard Polish: Lubię mięso, czy to wieprzowinę, czy wołowinę.

=== Grammatical differences between Masurian and Standard Polish ===
	Masurian	Polish
Formal forms	Wÿ/Pan/Pani robziče Matkia mogli	Pan/Pani robi Matka mogła
Past tense	Niáł	Miał
Present tense	Mám, Dám Má, Padá Zró	Mam, Dam Ma, Pada, Żrą
Present Pasive Participle	Zrobziónÿ	Zrobiony
Transgressive	Robzióncÿ	Robiąc
Reflexive Verb	Zrobzióno bÿło	Zrobiło się
Noun ("ja")	Francÿjá, stacÿjá	Francja, stacja
Noun ("ka")	Matkia, Dékia	Matka, Nakrycie
Accusative case (sing.)	Gádkie, Zÿcherkie	Gadkę, Agrafkę
Instrumental case (pl.)	Ludžani / Ludžoma Łapani / Łapóma	Ludźmi Łapami
Genitive (sing.)	Zÿčá, Pisaniá	Życia, Pisania
Dative (pl.)	Ludžám Džečám	Ludziom Dzieciom
Dative (sing.)	Psoziu Kónikoziu	Psu Konikowi
Adjective (in genitive, pl.)	Dobréch Głupsiéch	Dobrych Głupich
Adjective (in instrumental, pl.)	Dobrém	Dobrym
Adjective (in genitive, feminine sing.)	Mazurski Dobrÿ	Mazurskiej Dobrej
Adjective (in genitive, masculine sing.)	Małégo Ziélgiégo	Małego Wielkiego
Adjective (superlative form)	Náziénksÿ	Największy
Adjective ("ni")	Zÿtnÿ Ôstatnÿ	Żytni Ostatni
z + s z + z	z sobó z zgniłéch	ze sobą ze zgniłych
w + w	w Francÿji	we Francji

=== Grammatical constructions with sense verbs ===
Here, the structure is sense verb + object + verb.

Masurian	Standard Polish	English
Zidżiáł go stojicź	Widział, jak stał	He saw him standing
Pozawcor já słÿsała jéch spsiéwacź kole kosźczioła	Przedwczoraj słyszałam ich, jak śpiewali koło kościoła	The day before yesterday, I heard them singing near the church
Já wténcas zidżiał go w tÿ jizbzie stojicź	Wówczas widziałem go, jak stał w tym pokoju	I then saw him, standing in this room

== Writing system ==
Masurian alphabet	IPA (variants after the first are regional)	Examples
a, A	a	pask, Nikołajki
á, Á	a~ɒ~ɔ	wáju
ä, Ä	a~ʲa~ʲæ	matkä
b, B	b	bór
c, C	t͡s	cółno
ch, Ch	x	chléb
cz, Cz	t͡ɕ~t͡ʃ~t͡ʂ	spacz
d, D	d	dóra
dz, Dz	d͡z	dzáju
dż, Dż	d͡ʑ~d͡ʒ~d͡ʐ	Dżiałdowo
e, E	ɛ	psies
é, É	e~ɛ~i~ɨ	mléko
f, F	f~ɸ	fejfka
g, G	ɡ	giesz, gesz
h, H	x	hut
i, I	i~ɪ or used to palatalize the previous consonant	migi
j, J	j	jo
k, K	k	klémpa
l, L	l	listkárż
ł, Ł	w	głupsi
m, M	m	moznoszcz
n, N	n	nelkä
ń, Ń	ɲ	prżińdó
o, O	ɔ	muchór
ó, Ó	o~u~ɔ	dómb
ô, Ô	wɔ~ɔ	ôcziec
p, P	p	prask
r, R	r~ʀ~ʙ	rek
rż, Rż	ʐ~r̝~r	wéngorż
s, S	s	saniec
sz, Sz	ɕ~ʃʲ~ʂ	szwam
ś (si), Ś	ɕ~ʃ~ç	psiwo, Gołdapś
t, T	t	tlo
u, U	u	muszi
û, Û	wu~u	ûlica
w, W	v~β	wáju
ÿ, Ÿ	non-palatalizing i~ɪ, used before s, z, c, n	sÿpsie
z, Z	z	zégáwkä
ż, Ż	ʑ~ʒʲ~ʐ	kiżlák
ź (zi), Ź	ʑ~ʒ~ʝ	bzije, gołómbź

== Vocabulary ==
=== Small dictionary ===
Masurian ethnolect
Masurian	German	Polish
abštÿsikant	Junggeselle	walarek, zalotnik, absztyfikant
aštÿchnÿ	hastig	porywczy
bach	Kind	dziecko
best	flieder	bez
bónowač	herumschwirren	bzykać
bónÿ	Bohnen	fasola
brédek	Brötchen	bułka
buber	Saubohne	bób
bulwÿ	Kartoffeln	ziemniaki, kartofle
bursa	Geldbörse	portfel, portmonetka
cajtunek	Zeitung	gazeta
cegój	warum?	dlaczego?
čiskač	werfen	rzucić
chrachór	Taucher	nurek
cÿtrona	Zitrone	cytryna
dek	Dach	dach
drómel	Trommel	bęben
drón	Drohn	truteń
drózdÿ	Stare	szpaki
durowač	bestehen	trwać
dÿšlo	Deichsel	dyszel
érdbera	Walderdbeere	poziomka
fana	Fahne	flaga
farÿna	Zucker	cukier
feler	Fehler	błąd, feler
fifák	schlitzohr	nieszczery
flanca	Sämling	sadzonka
frÿštÿk	Frühstück	śniadanie
gbur	Bauer, Landwirt	rolnik, farmer, gospodarz
geš	Gans	gęś
giérÿ	Beine	nogi
gréfnÿ	flink	sprytny
gřniota	Gewitter	burza z piorunami
háka	Hacke	motyka
háuptniasto	Hauptstadt	stolica
hučik	Hut	kapelusz
huncfot	Weiberheld	kobieciarz, huncfot
jébel	Hobel	strug
jegoda	Heidelbeere	jagoda
káfej	Kaffee	kawa
káncÿnał	Gesangbuch	śpiewnik kościelny
kasta	Kasten	kufer, skrzynia
keksÿ	Kekse	ciasteczka
klapštula	Butterbrot	kanapka
kléta	Gerücht	plotka
kléwer	Klee	koniczyna
knéfel	Knopf	guzik
klónkra	Holzlöffel	drewniana łyżka
kokošiniec	Hühnerstall	kurnik
košór	Feuerhaken	pogrzebacz
kówera	Umschlag	koperta
krakia	Krähe	wrona
krÿstómbrÿ	Stachelbeeren	agrest
kukáwkia	Kuckuck	kukułka
kupač	kaufen	kupować
kurpsie	Latschen	chodaki, kapcie, pantofle
łapém	offen	otwarte
Mazurÿ	Masuren (Volk)	Mazurzy
méntel	Schmetterling	motyl
muchor	Fliegenpilz	muchomor
nicht	niemand	nikt
niések	Sack	worek, torba
ôbléta	Kleidung	odzież
oddazinÿ	Hochzeit	ślub
piláki	Entenküken	kaczuszki
pitróla	Petroleum	nafta
plik	Glatze	łysina
plómpa	Pumpe	pompa
plumÿ	Pflaumen	śliwki
práwÿ	Röhrling	borowik
prÿnc	Prinz	książę
psiwo, bir	Bier	piwo
pupa	Puppe	lalka
redošč	freude	radość
régal	Wandregal	półka
rektór	Lehrer	nauczyciel, rektor, belfer
scérnÿ	echter	prawdziwy
scubeł	Hecht	szczupak
stérač	verlieren	zgubić
stimač	fotografieren	fotografować
stréfle	Strümpfe	pończochy
šurek	Knabe	chłopczyk
šwam	Badeschwamm	gąbka
táskia	Tasse	filiżanka
téja	Tee	herbata, czaj
tÿna	Tonne	beczka
topek	Töpfchen	nocnik
tropki	Tropfen	krople
waba	Wabe	włoszczyzna
wálnÿ	gross	duży
wašlap	Geschirrtuch	ścierka
wej lo!	sieh mal!	spójrz tylko!
wéla	Welle	fala
wérÿ	Bett	łóżko
zaft	Saft	sok
za šiła	ziemlich viel	zbyt wiele
zaûsnik	Ohrring	kolczyk
zdrednie	Gefährlich	niebiezpiecznie
zégáwka, zégáwkia	Brennesseln	pokrzywa
zietř	Wind	wiatr
zrének	Morgen	poranek
zÿcher ze jo	selbstverständlich	oczywiście

=== Toponyms ===
List of city names
Masurian	Modern Polish
Bziáłá	Biała
Dżiałdowo, Dżiałdów	Działdowo
Gołdapś	Gołdap
Jánsbork, An(d)zbork	Pisz
Léc	Giżycko
Łek	Ełk
Nibork	Nidzica
Nikołajki	Mikołajki
Ôléck	Olecko
Ôlstinek	Olsztynek
Ôrżés	Orzysz
Ôstród	Ostróda
Pasÿń/Pasÿmek	Pasym
Rastémbork	Kętrzyn
Rin	Ryn
Scÿtno	Szczytno
Wéngobork	Węgorzewo
Zielbark	Wielbark
Zóndzbork	Mrągowo

=== Names of months ===
Nieszióndz (Months)
German-Latin system	Masurian
Januar, Anuar	Sticéń
Fébruar	Luti
Marc	Maržec
Aprél, April	Ksiecziéń
Mej	Maj
Juni	Cérziec
Juli	Lipsiec, Lÿpsiec
Áugust	Sziérżpsiéń
Zeptémber	Wrżesziéń
Ôktóber	Paźdžiérnik
Nowémber	Listopat, Listopad
Décémber	Grudnik

== Examples ==
=== Lord's Prayer ===
Masurian	Polish	Czech	English
Ôjce nas, chtórnÿš je w niebzie Niech še šwénči Twoje mniano, Niech přÿńdže Twoje królestwo ji béndže Twoja wola Jek w niebzie tozéz ji na žémni. Chléba naségo powsedniégo daj náma džišaj. Ji ôtpušč náma nase zinÿ, Jek ji mÿ ôtpuscawa nasém zinowajcám. Ji nie wódž náju na pokusenie Lo zbaw’ náju ôt złégo Amen	Ojcze nasz, któryś jest w niebie, święć się imię Twoje, przyjdź królestwo Twoje, bądź wola Twoja jako w niebie tak i na ziemi. Chleba naszego powszedniego daj nam dzisiaj. I odpuść nam nasze winy, jako i my odpuszczamy naszym winowajcom. I nie wódź nas na pokuszenie, ale zbaw nas ode złego. Amen.	Otče náš, jenž jsi na nebesích, posvěť se jméno Tvé Přijď království Tvé. Buď vůle Tvá, jako v nebi, tak i na zemi. Chléb náš vezdejší dej nám dnes A odpusť nám naše viny, jako i my odpouštíme naším viníkům a neuveď nás v pokušení, ale zbav nás od zlého. Amen.	Our Father in heaven, hallowed be your name. Your kingdom come, your will be done, on earth, as it is in heaven. Give us this day our dailybread, and forgive us our debts, as we also have forgiven our debtors. And lead us not into temptation, but deliver us from evil. Amen.

=== Song ===
A short Masurian song.

In Masurian	In Polish
Mazurskie Korżénie Skiela mi Mazuri ajw szie naráz wżiéni? Mi só tu wirosłe ôde tržéch koržéni Starégo Prusáka pokój erbowalim Jek ôt Rejchu Niémce robote swó wchalim Ôt Poláków bzierżém, co mi só naperte Take só Mazuri – nigdi nie ûmérte!	Mazurskie Korzenie Skąd my Mazurzy się tu nagle wzięliśmy? Wyrośliśmy z trzech korzeni Odziedziczyliśmy spokój Starego Prusa Niczym Niemcy z Rajchu chwalimy sobie pracę Od Polaków bierzemy upór Tacy są Mazurzy – nigdy nie wymarli!

=== Poem ===
Réjza

siodám ná koło

kiej féin pogodá

dumám tédÿ

nád zÿciem Mazurá

ajw násu ziamiá

ôddÿcha w dáli

ány rÿchtÿk pozwalá

mniá do dumániá

nád mójá réjzá

přéd siébie chućko jidé

ná drogách zÿciá

chtóré ûmÿká

chtórégo nie zabácé

po śmiérci, chtóra z latámi

přéniká ...

wsÿtko je féin

ajw ji téraz

jék budzié po tym co přÿjdzié

nié ziém...?

jédno jé péwné zé ajw jé féin

ná mójéj réjzié ..

== See also ==
- Dialects of the Polish language
- Languages of Europe
- Polish language
- Silesian language
