= Masurians =

Lechitic ethnic group of northeastern Poland

Mazurzy (Polish) Mazurzÿ (Masurian)
- Flag of Masuria

Total population
- ~5,000–15,000

Regions with significant populations
- Poland (Warmian-Masurian Voivodeship); Germany

Languages
- Polish (Masurian dialects), German (High German dialects)

Religion
- Predominantly; Lutheranism

Related ethnic groups
- Poles, Masovians, Kurpies

The Masurians or Mazurs (Polish: Mazurzy; German: Masuren; Masurian: Mazurÿ), historically also known as Prussian Masurians (Polish: Mazurzy pruscy), are a Polish ethnic group originating from the region of Masuria, within the modern-day Warmian-Masurian Voivodeship, Poland. They number around 5,000 to 15,000 people. In the 2011 Polish census, 1,376 individuals declared themselves to be Masurian as either a first or a secondary identification. Before World War II and its post-war expulsions, Masurians used to be a more numerous ethnic group found in the southern parts of East Prussia for centuries. Today, most Masurians live in what is now modern-day Germany and elsewhere.

Masurians are mostly descendants of colonists from Mazovia who moved north. Some research also indicate the admixture of the remains of the Old Prussians. These settlers moved during the State of the Teutonic Order and the Duchy of Prussia in the midst of the Protestant Reformation. They spoke the Masurian dialects. Since the mid-19th century, High German was increasingly used among Masurians as opposed to Low German used by most of East Prussia's German population. Many Masurians were often bilingual in German and Polish languages. In the 19th century, the Masuria region of East Prussia was named after the Masurians.

Like most of the East Prussian population, they favored Protestantism and adopted Lutheranism in 1525 when Albert, Duke of Prussia secularized the duchy and converted. Roman Catholic Warmiaks and the original Masovians were not affected, as they inhabited parts that formally belonged to the Kingdom of Poland. After World War II, many Masurians were classified as "Germans" and therefore mostly expelled along with them or emigrated after 1956 from what was now Poland to post-war Germany. Although most of them left for the West, some also ended up in East Germany. Conclusion of the war and ensuing resettlements also saw an ethnic conflict between leaving Masurians and incoming Kurpie mainly on religious (Protestant–Catholic) grounds.

== History ==
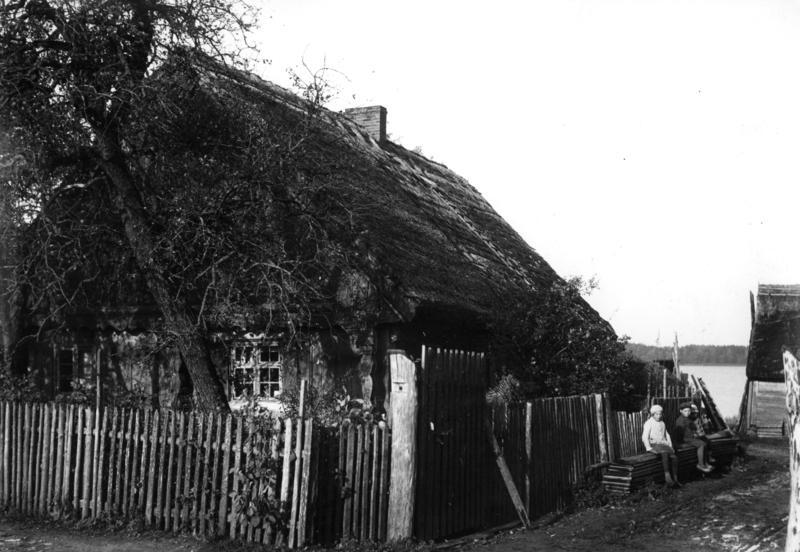
Typical Masurian farmhouse near a lake, East Prussia, 1931

In the Middle Ages, the inhabitants of the Duchy of Masovia were called Mazur(z)y in Polish. Between the 14th and 17th centuries, Polish settlers from northern Masovia moved to the southern territories of the Monastic State of the Teutonic Knights (these lands had previously belonged to the Baltic Old Prussians, whom the Teutonic Knights had conquered in the 13th and 14th centuries). The northern part of this state was soon settled by settlers from Germany and thus became Germanised. On the other hand, Protestants coming from the Duchy of Masovia, which was independent until 1526, partially Polonised a southern part of the Duchy of Prussia, later Kingdom of Prussia. Only in Allenstein, now Olsztyn, Catholics remained, because it belonged to the Prince-Bishopric of Ermland or Warmia.

Masurian farmhouse

Because of the influx of Masovians into the southern lakeland, the area started to be known as "Masuria" from the 18th century. During the Protestant Reformation, the Masurians, like most inhabitants of Ducal Prussia, became Lutheran Protestant, while the neighboring Masovians remained Roman Catholic. In 1525, the Duchy of Prussia, a Polish fief until 1657, was founded from the secularized order's territory and became the first ever officially Protestant state. The small minority of Protestant Masovians in southern Catholic Masovia inside Poland emigrated later to Prussian Masuria. Masuria became part of the Kingdom of Prussia at the Kingdom's founding in 1701, and part of the Prussian-led German Empire at the Empire's founding in 1871.

Masurians referred to themselves in the 19th century as "Polish Prussians" or as "Staroprusaki" (Old Prussians). Masurians showed considerable support for the Polish uprising in 1831, and maintained many contacts with Russian-held areas of Poland beyond the border of Prussia, the areas being connected by common culture and language; before the uprising people visited each other's country fairs and much trade took place, with smuggling also widespread. Some early writers about Masurians – like Max Toeppen – postulated them as mediators between Germanic and Slavic cultures.

During the 1840s, the folklorist Gustaw Gizewiusz (Gustav Gisevius) collected Masurian folk songs which were later included in Oskar Kolberg's compilation Dzieła Wszystkie.

=== Masurians in the nineteenth century ===
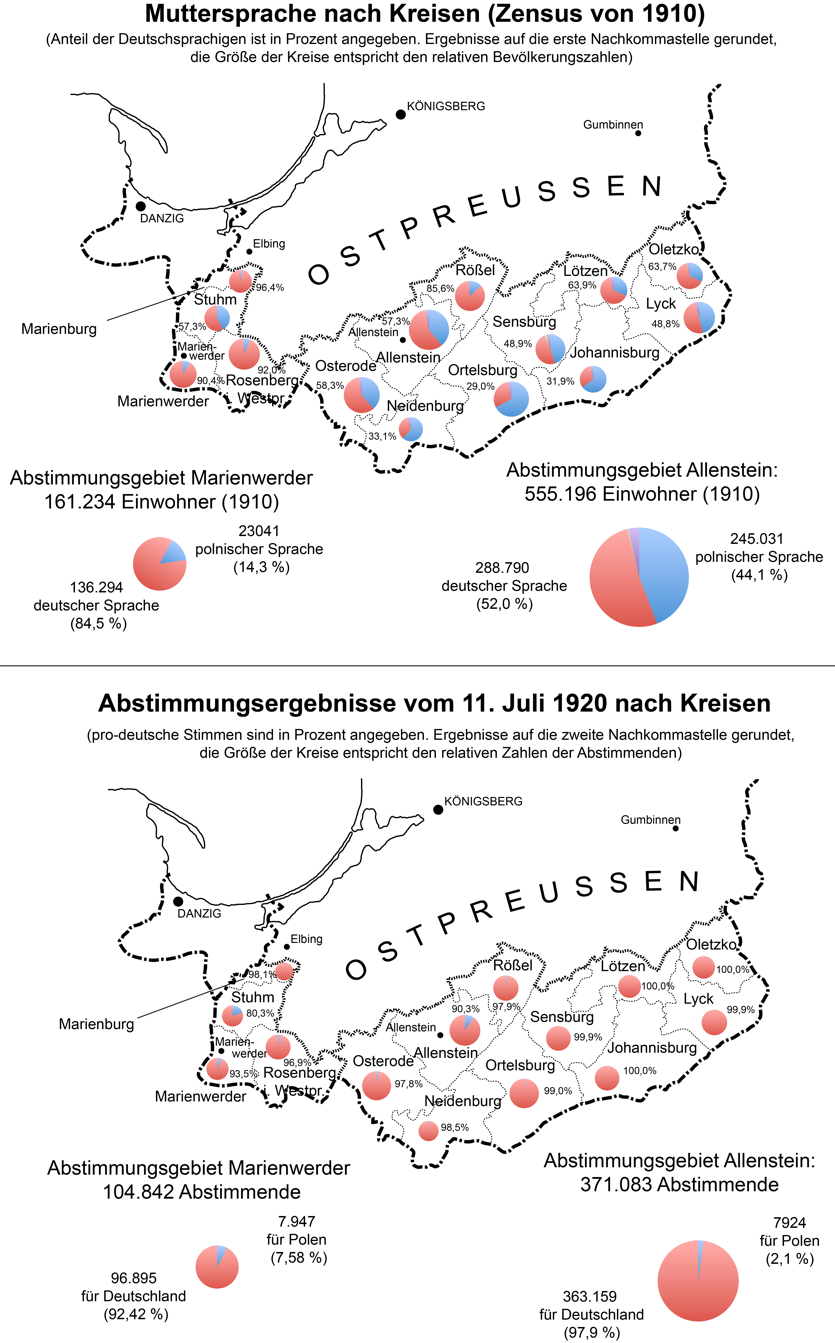
Language according to 1910 Prussian census and results of 1920 referendum in southern parts of East Prussia

According to Andrzej Chwalba or Henryk Samsonowicz, Polish national activists and Masurians already were engaged in cooperation in 1848 when Poles from Pomerania supported Masurian attempts to elect their representative Gustaw Gizewiusz who defended the use of Polish language and traditions. For Piotr Wandycz the events of 1848 led to Polish national awakening in Masuria. By contrast, Andreas Kossert writes that Polish interest in Masuria was inspired by a single poem published in 1872, "O Mazurach" by Wojciech Kętrzyński and that the unsuccessful attempts to create a Polish national spirit in Masuria were financed by Polish Nationalists from Posen (Poznan), Lemberg (Lviv) and Warsaw.

Beginning in the 1870s, Imperial German officials restricted the usage of languages other than German in Prussia's eastern provinces. The German authorities undertook several measures to Germanise the Masurians or to separate them culturally from neighboring Poles by creating a separate identity. After 1871 Masurians who expressed sympathy for Poland were deemed "national traitors" by German nationalists (this increased especially after 1918). According to Wojciech Wrzesinki, Masurians did not receive any assistance or help from Polish movements at the time. According to Stefan Berger, after 1871 the Masurians in the German Empire were seen in a view that while acknowledging their "objective" Polishness (in terms of culture and language) they felt "subjectively" German and thus should be tightly integrated into the German nation-state; to Berger this argument went directly against the German nationalist demands in Alsace where Alsacians were declared German despite their "subjective" choice. Berger concludes that such the arguments of German nationalists were simply aimed at gathering as much territory as possible into the German Reich.

==== Population size ====
Mother tongue of the inhabitants of Masuria, by county, during the first half of the 19th century:

Ethno-linguistic structure of Masurian counties in the first half of the 19th century, according to German data
County (German name)	Year	Polish-speakers	%	German-speakers	%	Lithuanian-speakers	%	Total population
Gołdap (Goldap)	1831	5845	19%	21463	69%	3614	12%	30922
Olecko (Oletzko)	1832	23302	84%	4328	16%	22	0%	27652
Ełk (Lyck)	1832	29246	90%	3413	10%	4	0%	32663
Węgorzewo (Angerburg)	1825	12535	52%	11756	48%	66	0%	24357
Giżycko (Lötzen)	1832	20434	89%	2528	11%	25	0%	22987
Pisz (Johannisburg)	1825	28552	93%	2146	7%	0	0%	30698
Mrągowo (Sensburg)	1831	28753	90%	3209	10%	0	0%	31962
Szczytno (Ortelsburg)	1825	34928	92%	3100	8%	0	0%	38028
Nidzica (Neidenburg)	1825	27467	93%	2149	7%	1	0%	29617
Ostróda (Osterode)	1828	23577	72%	9268	28%	0	0%	32845
Total	1825/32	234,639	78%	63,360	21%	3,732	1%	301,731

=== Masurians in the twentieth century ===
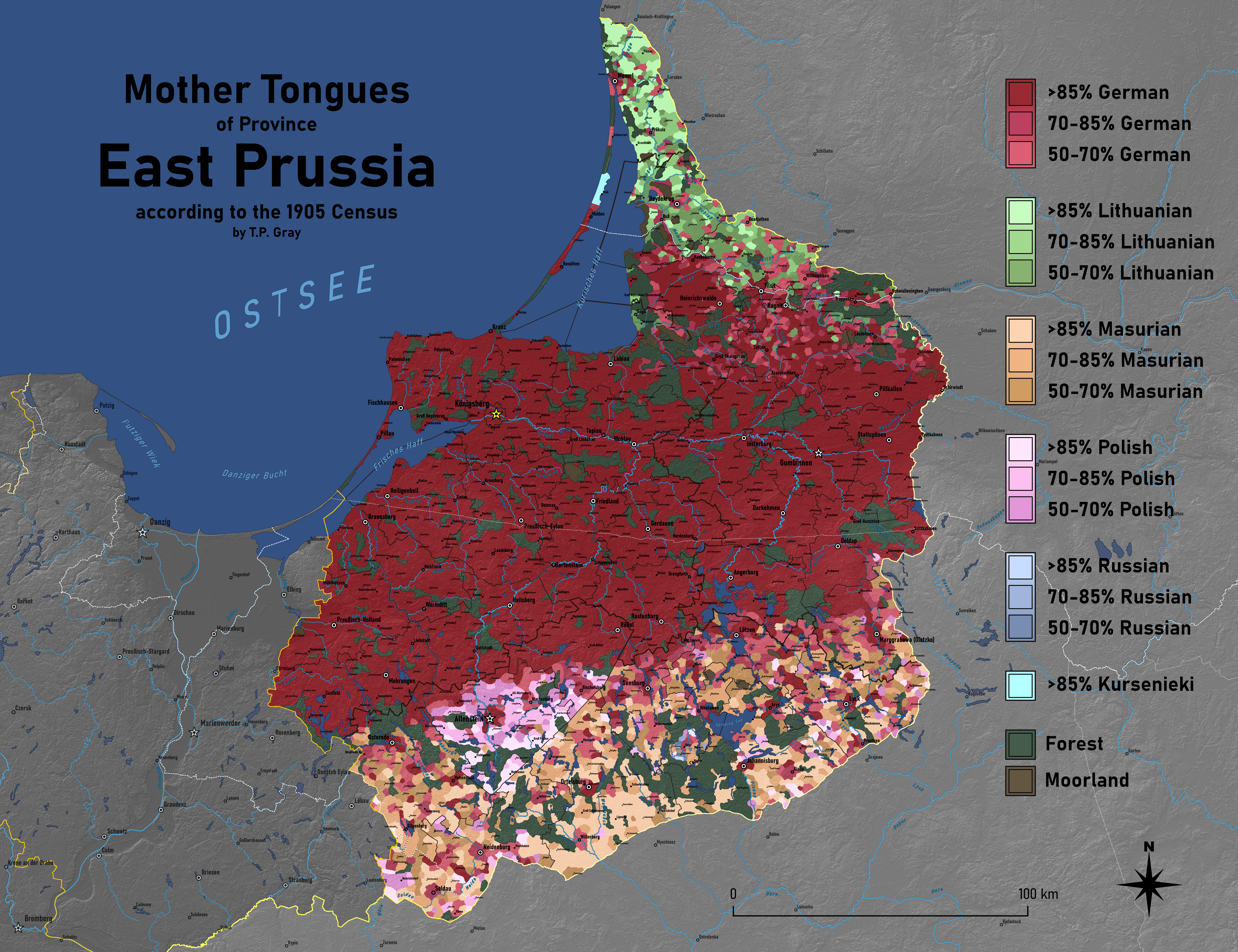
Mother Tongues of East Prussia, according to the 1905 Census; Masurians are indicated in shades of tan, in southern East Prussia

Before World War I many Masurians emigrated to the Ruhr Area, especially to Gelsenkirchen. Here, Masurians were not distinguished apart from the Poles and both groups were seen as inferior to Germans, culturally or even racially. Despite those official efforts, German scholars usually considered Masurians as a group of Poles. In all German geographical atlases published at the beginning of the 20th century, the southern part of East Prussia was marked as an ethnically Polish area, with the number of Poles estimated at 300,000.

There was resistance among the Masurians towards Germanization efforts, the so-called Gromadki movement was formed which supported use of Polish language and came into conflict with German authorities; while most of its members viewed themselves as loyal to the Prussian state, some of them joined the Pro-Polish faction of Masurians. In general, popular resistance against linguistic Germanisation cannot be easily equated with anti-German sentiment or a strong attachment to the Polish national movement. Most of Masuria's small Polish-speaking intelligentsia remained decisively pro-Prussian, often adhering to an older, multi-ethnic model of Prussian identity, centred on loyalty to their king, not so much on the German language. This ethnically, but not nationally Polish identity was a repeated source of consternation for Polish national activists, and decidedly pro-Polish political parties and press never gained widespread influence among the general populace. Richard Blanke summarised this long-standing attachment, going back to the late Middle Ages, as "Masurians became Prussian, in other words, before the Bretons (not to mention the Alsatians) became French."

The Masurians evinced strong support for Germany during World War I. In 1920, the League of Nations supervised the East Prussian plebiscite – with British, French and Italian troops stationed in Masuria – to determine the new border between the Second Polish Republic and German East Prussia. The plebiscite was organized by the local German authorities. Polish ethnographer Adam Chętnik stated that the German authorities performed abuses and falsifications during the plebiscite, and Stefan Berger writes that the Masurians were subjected to huge psychological pressure and physical violence by German side to vote for Germany. Kossert admits irregularities during the referendum, but asserts that in general, its results truthfully reflected the overwhelmingly pro-German sentiment in southern East Prussia. In Masuria proper the vast majority (99.32%) opted to remain in Prussia. Attempts to create schools teaching Polish in interwar Germany were met with terror and violence.

The time of the liberal Weimar republic saw a strong trend of conversion from the Polish language to the German language among the Masurians.

Support for the Nazi Party was high in Masuria, especially in elections in 1932 and 1933. Nazis used the Masurian dialect for their political rallies during the campaigning. The government of Nazi Germany changed the names of several Masurian towns and villages from their original Slavic or Baltic Prussian names to new German names in 1938. During World War II the Nazis persecuted and killed Polish speakers in Masuria and imprisoned Polish teachers as well as children who learned Polish. The Nazis believed that in future, the Masurians as a separate non-German entity would disappear, while those who would cling to their "foreignness", as one Nazi report mentioned, would be deported. Poles and Jews were considered by Nazis to be "untermenschen", subject to slavery and extermination, and Nazi authorities murdered Polish activists in Masuria. Those who were not killed were arrested and sent to concentration camps.

In 1943, "Związek Mazurski" was reactivated secretly by Masurian activists of the Polish Underground State in Warsaw and led by Karol Małłek. Związek Mazurski opposed Nazi Germany and asked Polish authorities during the war to liquidate German property after victory over Nazi Germany to help in agricultural reform and settlement of Masurian population, Masurians opposed to Nazi Germany requested to remove German heritage sites "regardless of their cultural value". Additionally a Masurian Institute was founded by Masurian activists in Radość near Warsaw in 1943. Andreas Kossert regards these claims as a presumption completely disregarding the actual conditions of the Masurian people.

Along with the majority of ethnic German East Prussians, many Masurians fled to western Germany as the Soviet Red Army approached East Prussia in 1945 in the final European campaigns of World War II. The post-war Potsdam Conference placed Masuria – and the rest of southern East Prussia – under Polish administration. Many Masurians who were classified as Germans were expelled with military force. After 1956, many who had remained in Poland emigrated to West Germany. As of 2003, approximately 5,000 Masurians still lived in the area, many of them as members of the German minority. Speculations about the reasons of this emigration vary, from the economic situation and the undemocratic – communist – system in Poland to the shrinking prospect of a return of Masuria to Germany.

Mazur remains the 14th most common surname in Poland, with almost 67,000 people bearing the name. According to ethnographer Adam Chętnik, the Masurians were most closely related to the Kurpie branch of the Poles. A group of Masurians migrated south and became one of the main components of the Lasowiacy, who live in the northern part of the Subcarpathian Voivodeship.

Proportion of the Polish-speaking population in the Masurian districts of East Prussia. (Note: According to Prussian censuses and Polish estimates. The first columns of each year refer to the results of the Prussian censuses. These are the total percentages for all people who were recorded as having "Masurian" or "Polish" as their mother tongue, sometimes bilingually with "German". The second columns of each year refer to two different Polish estimates. Those for 1861–1910 have been made by Belzyt in 1996 on the basis of the significantly higher number of Polish-speaking schoolchildren (Belzyt, Leszek (1996). "Zur Frage des nationalen Bewusstseins der Masuren im 19. und 20. Jahrhundert". Zeitschrift für Ostmitteleuropa-Forschung.), although Blanke reduces their validity by saying: "But one cannot simply extrapolate from the school enrollment figures, for Polish-Masurian families typically had more children than the German average. Moreover, a significant feature of Masurian life was that many people 'became' German only as adults, for which reason one would expect to find a lower percentage of Polish-speaking adults than schoolchildren. In consideration of these and other factors, Belzyt has basically split the difference between the two sets of figures in order to arrive at the above figures in parentheses." (Blanke, p. 84.) The estimates for 1925 have been cited by Kossert, (who claims to have taken them from Pohorecki). They either lack an estimate for all of Masuria, or Kossert omitted that.)
District	1861 (census)	1861 (estimate)	1890 (Census)	1890 (estimate)	1910 (census)	1910 (estimate)	1925 (census)	1925 (estimate)
Johannisburg (Pisz)	82,4%	(90%)	78,8%	(83%)	68%	(77,9%)	20,4%	(60–80%)
Lötzen (Giżycko)	64,5%	(80%)	50,6%	(65%)	35,9%	(58,9%)	4,4%	(25–40%)
Lyck (Ełk)	78,6%	(85%)	66,6%	(73%)	51%	(68,9%)	11,3%	(45–70%)
Neidenburg (Nidzica)	81,6%	(87%)	75,6%	(84%)	66,6%	(80%)	23,1%	(50–65%)
Oletzko (Olecko)	57,7%	(75%)	47,7%	(57%)	29,6%	(51%)	8%	(25–60%)
Ortelsburg (Szczytno)	87,9%	(92%)	78,1%	(85%)	70,1%	(82,9%)	30,4%	(65–75%)
Osterode (Ostróda)	63,1%	(67%)	54,3%	(63%)	41,2%	(55,9%)	11,7%	(25–45%)
Sensburg (Mrągowo)	74,7%	(87%)	62,2%	(72%)	49,6%	(67,5%)	12,8%	(40–50%)
Total	74,4%	(83%)	65,3%	(73,4%)	52,4%	(69%)	16,3%	(?)

== Notable Masurians ==
- Gustaw Gizewiusz (1810–1848), pastor
- Lothar Gall (1936–2024), historian
- Ferdinand Gregorovius (1821–1891), historian
- Georg Andreas Helwing (1666–1748), botanist
- Paul Hensel (1867–1944), Lutheran theologian and politician
- Wojciech Kętrzyński (1838–1918), historian
- Walter Kollo (1878–1940), composer
- Krystyn Lach-Szyrma (1790–1866), professor of philosophy
- Udo Lattek (1935–2015), football player
- Siegfried Lenz (1926–2014), author
- Hieronim Malecki (1527–1584), theologian, writer
- Krzysztof Celestyn Mrongovius (1764–1855), writer
- Celestyn Myślenta (1588–1653), theologian
- Rodolphe Radau (1835–1911), astronomer and mathematician
- Bethel Henry Strousberg (1823–1884), industrialist and railway entrepreneur
- Ernst Wiechert (1887–1950), poet
- Carl Gustav Sanio (1832–1891), botanist and professor

== See also ==
- Róża (2011 film)
- Masurian dialects
- Warmiak
- Lietuvininks
- Kursenieki
- Mazurka
- List of Medieval Slavic tribes
