= Near Masovian dialect =

Dialect of Polish spoken in Poland

Near Mazovian dialect
- Native to: Poland
- Region: Southern Masovia
- Language family: Indo-European: Balto-Slavic; Slavic; West Slavic; Lechitic; Polish; Masovian; Near Mazovian dialect

Language codes
- ISO 639-3: –

The Near Masovian dialect (Polish: gwary Mazowsza bliższego) belongs to the Masovian dialect group and is located in the area surrounding the capital of Poland, Warsaw. It borders the Łowicz dialect to the southwest, the Lesser Polish Masovian Borderland dialect to the south, the Western Lublin dialect to the southeast, the Podlachia dialect to the east, the Far Mazovian dialect to the north, the Greater Polish Chełmno-Dobrzyń dialect to the northwest, the Kujawy dialect to the west, and the Lesser Polish Sieradz dialect to the southwest.

The Near Masovian dialect is a younger dialect compared to others, and often is influenced by Polish from the capital.

== Phonology ==
Typical of Masovian dialects, devoicing of word-final consonants before vowels and liquids is present here. Also typical of Masovian dialects is the presence of masuration.

=== Vowels ===
The shift of initial ja-, ra- > je-, re- is present but limited to particular words: jek (jak), remię (ramię). Ablaut is often levelled: wymietał (wymiatał). Medial -ar- sporadically changes to -er-, most often in the northwest. Final -ej often raises to -yj/-ij and can sometimes further reduce to -y/-i: cały (całej), późni (później). i, y often lower before liquids: lubjeli (lubili), derektor (dyrektor). Final -ył/-ił often shift to -uł, usually in the past tense: piuł (pił).

==== Slanted vowels ====
Slanted á is either retained as á or raises to o, or often realized as a as in Standard Polish. Slanted é can be retained as é (with many phonetic variants), raised to y/i, or often realized as e as in Standard Polish, which can also be seen in the masculine/neuter genitive adjectival ending -ygo/-igo. Slanted ó is either retained as ó or raised to u, as in Standard Polish.

==== Nasal vowels ====
Medial ę typically decomposes to eN, or can rarely lower to aN (more commonly in the east), or sometimes can raise to yN, iN (more common elsewhere in the region). Final -ę denasalizes to -e. The group eN usually doesn't change, but it can sometimes raise or lower as ę. Medial ą typically decomposes and raises. Final ą has a tendency to denasalize to -o and sometimes raises to -u, or can decompose to -oł. Medial nasal vowels can decompose before sibilants as well, but there is also a common tendency for them to denasalize and have -j-, -ł- inserted: gołski (gąski), niescejście (nieszczęście). Both nasal vowels denasalize before l, ł and can sometimes raise. The group oN tends to raise to óN, uN. The group uN tends to lower óN or sometimes oN.

==== Prothesis ====
Initial i- often has a prothetic j-, and sometimes lowers to e: jinna (inna), jenacy (inaczej). Initial o- usually labializes to ô-, and to a lesser extent initial u- to û-.

=== Consonants ===
Soft labials tend to decompose, where the palatal element becomes j. The groups św’-, ćw’-, dźw’- tend to harden: śfynie (świnie). The group li tends to harden to ly. Soft kie, gie, ki, gi, tend to remain soft, but can sometimes harden. kę, gę can sometimes soften: matkie (matkę). Sometimes chy softens to chi: chiba (chyba). kt usually shifts to cht: chto (kto). The groups chw, chrz shift to kw, krz: kwali (chwali), krzan (chrzan).

== Inflection ==
Many typical Masovian features can be seen in the inflection.

=== Nouns ===
The instrumental plural ending -ami hardens to -amy. Sometimes it can also change to -ani. The rare ending -mi may also harden to -my: końmy (końmi). There is a preference for -a as the masculine genitive singular ending over -u. The masculine dative singular can be formed with standard -owi and -u, which are most common, but also -oju (via contamination of -owi and -u), which occurs more often in the Siedlce Voivodeship, and sometimes -ewi near Łowicz, which can be used regardless of the softness of the final stem consonant. The masculine/neuter instrumental singular ending -em has many phonetic variants. In the northwest it may raise to -ym (after hard consonants) or to -im (after soft consonants). In the rest of the north it may sometimes lower to -am. Masculine and neuter nouns ending in sz, ż sometimes take -e instead of -u in the locative singular: o kosie (o koszu). This occurs more if the word has undergone masuration. Feminine nouns that have undergone masuration can have a similar process: o dusie (o duszy). Neuter nouns ending in -ę sometimes also change declination and lose -en-: o imiu (o imieniu). The nominative plural of masculine nouns is also often formed differently than in Standard Polish, or sometimes in multiple different ways: nauczycielowie (nauczyciele), pisarze, pisarzowie (pisarze). Soft stem masculine nouns in the genitive plural can take both -y/-i as well as -ów, but there is a preference for -ów: kluczy, kluczów (kluczy). Similarly, there is a strong preference for -ów as the genitive plural ending for nouns of other genders, as well. Feminine nouns ending in a consonant sometimes take -i/-y as well: kości, kościów (kości). Feminine nouns ending in a consonant sometimes take -y/-i and sometimes -e in the nominative plural: koście, kości (kości). The dative plural ending -om sometimes raises to -óm.

=== Adjectives, adverbs, pronouns, and numerals ===
The comparative of adverbs and the feminine genitive/locative singular of adjectives, pronouns, and numerals can be -yj/-ij or -y/-i due to sound changes. The masculine/neuter genitive singular ending of adjectival declensions is usually -ygo/-igo. Adjectives, pronouns, and numerals take -em, -ém in the masculine instrumental/locative singular instead of standard -ym/-im: na tem jednem (na tym jednym), and the plural is -emy, -émy instead of -ymi/-imi: przede wszystkiem (przede wszystkim), ze wszystkiemi (ze wszystkimi).

=== Verbs ===
The past tense may be -uł instead of -ył/-ił due to sound changes. Final -ł after consonants in the past tense of verbs tends to disappear, including before clitics: potłukem (potłukłem). The first person plural present tense of verbs is usually -m alongside standard -my: musim (musimy), jeździmy (jeździmy). -wa is sometimes used here as well, but is rare: idziewa (idziemy). The first person plural past tense is archaic -m alongside standard -śmy: ucieklim, uciekliśmy (uciekliśmy). -wa is sometimes used here as well, but is rare: byliźwa (byliśmy). -ta is often used for the second person plural of verb forms alongside standard -cie: niesieta (niesiecie), nieśliśta (nieśliście), weźta, weźcie (weźcie).

== Vocabulary ==
=== Word-Formation ===
Many typical Masovian features can be seen in the word-formation.

==== Nouns ====
-icha, -arz, -ka, and -ica are more productive suffixes here. -ak may be attached to nouns to mean “son of”: stolarzak (son of a carpenter). -ka may be attached to nouns meaning “wife of”: stolarka (wife of a carpenter). Nouns denoting young animals and people are formed with -ak, but -ę (and its diminutive -ątko) can be seen in the south. -al may be attached to create a noun that has characteristic traits of something, often pejorative in connation: głowal (person with a big head). -ina may be attached to trees meaning “forest of”: dębina (oak forest).

==== Verbs ====
The prefix roz- can frequently lose the initial r- in the west. Infinitives that normally end with -eć often end in -yć/-ić here: siedzić (siedzieć), leżyć (leżeć). Some verbs are sometimes formed with -ać instead of standard -ywać/-ować: kupać (kupować).

== Syntax ==
Masculine personal nouns are converted to masculine animal nouns: te dobre chłopy kosiły (ci dobrzy chłopi kosili).

== See also ==
- Dialects of the Polish language
- Languages of Europe
- Polish language
