= Masurian Institute =

Polish research organisation

The Masurian Institute (Polish: Instytut Mazurski) in Olsztyn was a scientific research body established in 1943 during World War II in German-occupied Poland in Radość near Warsaw by the underground Masurian Union (Związek Mazurski). In 1945 the headquarters moved to Olsztyn, the main city of the Masurian movement.

Its purpose was to undertake all kinds of research relating to the regions of Warmia and Masuria. Its main publication, which still continues, is the quarterly Komunikaty Warmińsko-Mazurskie, considered by the State Committee for Scientific Research to be one of the most important Polish historical journals.

In 1948 the Masurian Institute became the scientific branch of the Western Institute in Poznań, and since 1953 part of the Polish Historical Society. In 1961 the Fundacja Naukowa im. Wojciecha Kętrzyńskiego (Wojciech Kętrzyński Scientific Foundation) was established in Olsztyn and took over some of the resources and staff of the Masurian Institute. In 1963 the organisation changed its name to the Ośrodek Badań Naukowych im. Wojciecha Kętrzyńskiego w Olsztynie (Wojciech Kętrzyński Scientific Research Centre in Olsztyn), now the Instytut Północny im. Wojciecha Kętrzyńskiego (Wojciech Kętrzyński Northern Institute).
