= Podlachian dialect =

Dialect of Polish spoken in Poland

- Native to: Poland
- Region: Podlachia
- Language family: Indo-European: Balto-Slavic; Slavic; West Slavic; Lechitic; Polish; Masovian; Podlachian dialect

Language codes
- ISO 639-3: –

The Podlachian dialect (Polish: gwary podlaskie) belongs to the Masovian dialect group and is located in the part of Poland. It borders the Suwałki dialect to the north, the Masurian dialects to the far northwest, the Far Mazovian dialect to the west, the Near Mazovian dialect to the southwest, the Lesser Polish Eastern Greater Polish dialect to the south, and the Northern Borderlands dialect to the east.

Features of Podlachian often exist on a spectrum, with increased East Slavic influence towards the east, thus Podlachian can be classified as a dialect continuum. The perception of Podlachian as a regional lect is quite strong, and often code-switching between it and Standard Polish occurs, with different levels of use of the dialect depending on the region, though Standard Polish is preferred in the area.

== Phonology ==
Typical of Masovian dialects, devoicing of word-final consonants before vowels and liquids is present here, including before clitics. Mazuration is present in the Podlachian dialect, most commonly in the western varieties of the dialect. However, often palatal sibilants (ć, dź, ś, ź) harden somewhat, though this is inconsistent. Similarly, hard sibilants (cz, dż, sz, ż), may somewhat soften. Stress is generally penultimate as in Standard Polish, but may also move due to influence from East Slavic languages, namely, it may sometimes be initial: ‘aptekarzom (apte’karzom), or sometimes final: farba’mi (far’bami). Similarly, the particle się sometimes fuses as an element in verbs, rather than being a mobile clitic, and may be realized as s’a or s’e: zostałs’a (został się).

=== Vowels ===
Akanie is present here, in which unstressed o (or rarely e) changes to a. However, the origin of this change is different than East Slavic. Stressed o (and rarely stressed e) may occasionally also change to a: arganizawali (organizowali), bułak (bułek), uczana (uczona). Similarly, ukanie is also present, where unaccented o changes to u, typically when before the stressed syallable. The resulting u is sometimes labialized, as initial o is often labialized. Ukanie is present in regions where akanie is not: gutowali (gotowali). Unstressed i may lower to e: okolecznos’ci (okoliczności). Mobile e may be inserted in some consonant clusters: wiater (wiatr).

==== Slanted vowels ====
Slanted á is realized as a, as in Standard Polish. Slanted é is sometimes retained as é or raised to as y/i in the east, but is generally e in the west, as in Standard Polish. Slanted ó is raised to u, as in Standard Polish.

==== Nasal vowels ====
Medial ę is often decomposed to eN: pempak (pępek); sometimes decomposed and lowered to aN: wandlina (wędlina); or raised to i (in dialects where unstressed e may raise): klinkali (klękali); and rarely denasalized: bedzie (będzie) Medial ą can be decomposed to oN: pokond (pokąd); occasionally raise to uN in dialects with ukanie: sunsiedzi (sąsiedzi); lower to aM: do Dambrowy (do Dąbrowy), or remain nasal: łąków (łąk). Final ę is typically denasalized to e: życze (życzę); and sometimes backed to o: odprawja mszo (odprawia mszę); or lowered to a in dialects with akanie: nie żałuja (nie żałuję). Final ą denasalizes to o: churujo (chorują).

==== Prothesis ====
Initial i sometimes takes a prothetic j. o often labializes to ô- and to a lesser extent u to û-: akordeôn (akordeon), môżna (można), ôjciec (ojciec), û nas (u nas), ûs’emdziesiąt (osiemdziesiąt).

=== Consonants ===
Often l is pronounced soft here, particularly before e and i: l’ata (lata). However, a pronunciation that of Standard Polish is also common. Similarly, dark ł is often retained, usually due to influence from Eastern Slavic. This trait is fading, and is often replaced with /w/. Sometimes rz hardens to r due to influence from Eastern Slavic: treba (trzeba). h is often pronounced different (/ɦ/) than ch due to Eastern Slavic influence. This is more common amongst older speakers; amongst younger speakers this pronunciation is typically restricted to particular words, usually expressive in use. Similarly, g can shift to ch (not h!) due to Eastern Slavic influence: żadnocho (żadnego). In Czerwonka and Jasionówka, w can sometimes change to u, or sometimes to ł (typically in inflections): u chlewie (w chlewie), budynkoł (budynków). kt shifts to cht: chto (kto). As in other Masovian dialects, soft labials tend to decompose, where the palatal element strengthens to j. gdź reduces to dź: dz’e (gdzie). dl reduces to l: la (dla). trz reduces to czsz: czszy (trzy). zcz changes to szcz: roszczyna (rozczyna). A few other consonant clusters or sequences are reduces: opojem (opowiem), k (jak). In Dolistowo and sporadically in Jabłęczna, kie, gie may harden, typical of Masovian dialects: takego (takiego). In Jabłeczna, chy may also soften, also typical of Masovian dialects: chiba (chyba). ń hardens to n before c, s, sz as a result of eastern influence: przetanczył (przetańczył).

=== Contraction ===
Nouns ending -cja, -zja, etc., often appear uncontracted: procesyja (procesja). In Czerwonka and Jasionówka, adjectives may appear in uncontracted forms due to Eastern Slavic influence: zdrowyje (zdrowe), chentnyje (chętne).

== Inflection ==
Masovian inflectional features are present, as are influences from Eastern Slavic languages.

=== Nouns ===
In Czerwonka the accusative feminine singular is -u instead of -ę (realized as -e) due to East Slavic influence: machorku (machorkę). This may also occur with pronouns and adjectives: takuju starszu babc’u (taką starszą babcię). Similarly, in Czerwonka, the instrumental singular is sometimes -oj, -aju (-oju) due to East Slavic influence: z toj wjoskoj (z tą wioską), kasic’ kasoju (kosić kosą). More common is -o (from -ą). Often throughout the region, soft-stem feminine and masculine nouns take -y/-i in the nominative pluralinstead of -e due to East Slavic influence: koszuli (koszule), koni (konie). The feminine locative singular sometimes takes -u: na ulicu (na ulicy), na kufru (na kufrze); or -e: u krwie (we krwi). Sometimes the feminine plural is formed with -e instead of -y/-i: z pierzyne (z pierzyny). The instrumental masculine/neuter plural is sporadically formed with -om instead of -em: z ksiondzom (z księdzem). Often the instrumental plural ending -mi is levelled with -ami, as in other Masovian dialects: koniami (końmi). Many individual nouns also show declined forms different than in Standard Polish.

=== Adjectives, adverbs, pronouns, and numerals ===
Pronouns, numerals, and adjecetives can take -ę (realized as -e) in the feminine accusative singular via analogy to the nominal inflection: na swoje strone (na swoją stronę). The genitive plural of neuter nouns may also be formed differently: dwoje dzieciej (dwoje dzieci). Numerals may show sporadic alternative declensions as well.

=== Verbs ===
Verb forms without personal clitics may be seen due to Eastern Slavic influence alongside forms with the clitic: ja pojechał (pojechałem), skończyłam (skończyłam). Cliticless forms are more common. Cliticless forms are the only way to form the past tense for the first person plural: przyjechali my (przyjechaliśmy). In Jasionówka, -m may be used instead of -my as the first person plural present tense verb ending: nie gotujem (nie gotujemy). A few other sporadic changes to verb conjugation may be seen.

== Syntax ==
Most famously, the construction dla + genitive is used instead of the dative, which can also lead to hypercorrections. This can occur for speakers of all generations. Sometimes the genitive singular may be governed by the numerals dwa, trzy, cztery as a result of Eastern Slavic influence, but generally Standard Polish government dominates. Similarly, the nominative plural is sometimes used for numerals ending in 5-1: dwadz’es’c’a kilometry (dwadzieścia kilometrów). The genitive singular may also be used: osiem chłopa (osiem chłopów). Often the prepositions bez and przez are confused. Masculine personal nouns are often treated as masculine animal nouns, but verbs take masculine personal agreement for non-virile forms: te dobre chłopy kosili (ci dobrzy chłopi kosili), te dobre baby pomagali (te dobre baby pomagały). Other forms of levelling this gender occur, but this is the most common.

== See also ==
- Dialects of the Polish language
- Languages of Europe
- Polish language
