= Masovian dialect group =

Dialect of the Polish language

- dialekty mazowieckie
- Native to: Poland
- Region: Masovian Voivodeship, Podlaskie Voivodeship, Lublin Voivodeship, Warmian–Masurian Voivodeship
- Ethnicity: Masovians
- Language family: Indo-European: Balto-Slavic; Slavic; West Slavic; Lechitic; Polish; Masovian dialect group
- Writing system: Latin (Polish alphabet)

Language codes
- ISO 639-3: –
- Glottolog: None
- Linguasphere: 53-AAA-cc (varieties: 53-AAA-cca to 53-AAA-ccu)

The Masovian dialect group (Polish: dialekt mazowiecki), also Mazovian, is a dialect group of the Polish language spoken in Mazovia and historically related regions, in northeastern Poland. It is the most distinct of the Polish dialects and the most expansive.

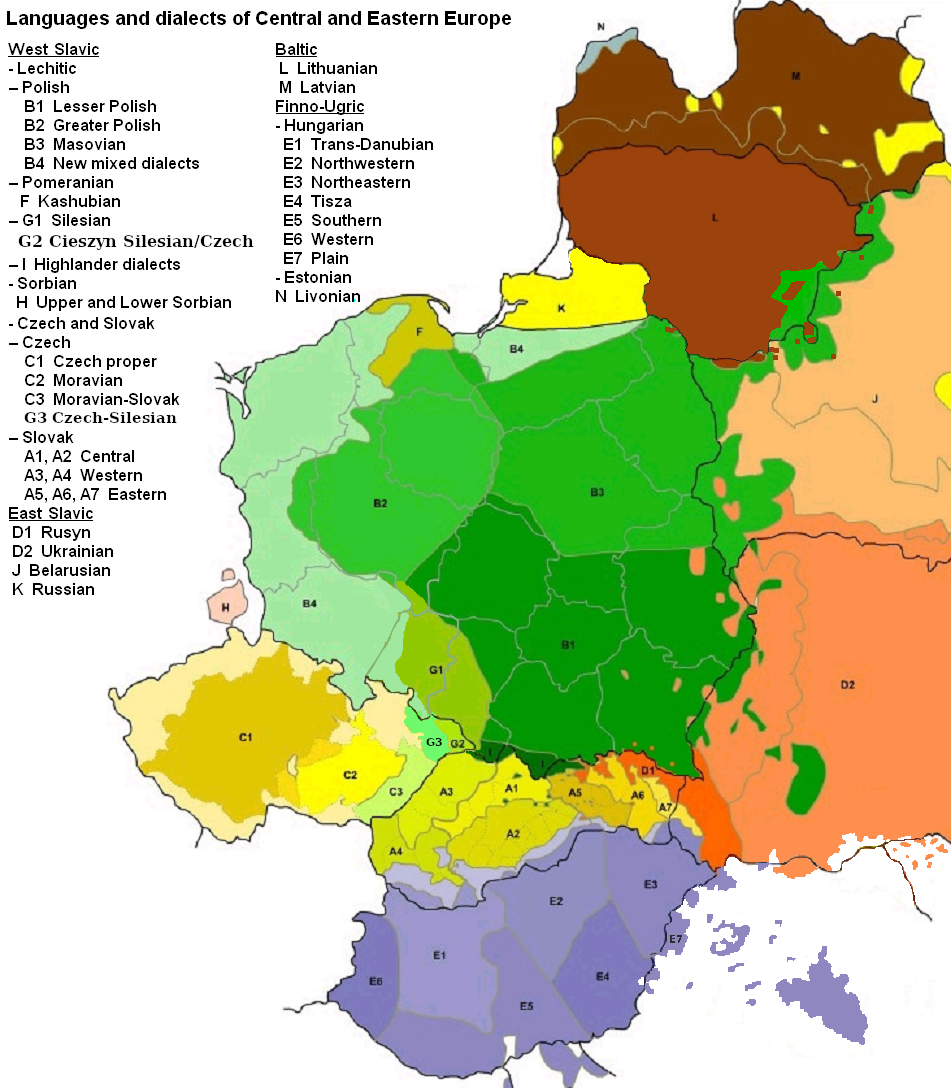
Masovian dialect (B3) among languages of Central Europe

Mazovian dialects may exhibit such features as mazurzenie, sandhi (intervocalic voicing of obstruents on word boundaries), and asynchronous palatal pronunciation of labial consonants (so-called softening). Characteristics include:

- Depalatalization of velars before /ɛ/ and palatalization of velars before historical /ɛ̃/; e.g. standard Polish rękę, nogę ('arm', 'leg', in the accusative case) is rendered [ˈrɛŋkʲɛ], [ˈnɔɡʲɛ] respectively instead of [ˈrɛŋkɛ], [ˈnɔɡɛ];
- /li/ sequences realized [lɪ] instead of [lʲi];
- merger of the retroflex series sz, ż, cz, dż into the alveolar s, z, c, dz;
- /ɨ/ > /i/ before certain consonants;
- the Old Polish dual number marker -wa continues to be attached to verbs;
- Standard Polish /ɔ̃/ and /ɛ̃/ merged with /u/ and /a/ respectively, in most situations;
- certain instances of a > e;
- [mʲ] > [ɲ]

Masovian dialects also contain certain vocabulary that is distinct from the standard Polish language and shares common characteristics with the Kashubian language.

== List of dialects ==
Descended from the language of the Masovians, the dialects are:

- Lubawa dialect
- Ostróda dialect
- Warmian dialect
- Masurian dialects
- Suwałki dialect
- Łowicz dialect
- Near Masovian dialect
- Far Masovian dialect
- Kurpie dialect
- Podlachian dialect
- Białystok dialect
- Warsaw dialect

== Features of the region ==
Features that can be found in various intensities and distributions in the region include:

1. Labiovelarization of *telt > tëłt > tołt > tłot *pelti > płoc (Compare Polish pleć) (perhaps with the exception of słoʒona, sledziona)
2. *TorT > TroT
3. *ľ̥ > l̥ except in Pľ̥T́PK (po wargowych, a przed palatalnymi, wargowymi, i tylkojęzykowymi)
4. remaining *ľ̥ in Pľ̥T́PK > ‘el: ḿelli, hard *l̥ > oł (Stolpsko), Pľ̥T (after a labial, before a hard postalveolar > ṔołT: v́ołna
5. softening of consonants before *ŕ̥t> ar: tfardi except źarno and śarno
6. interword devoicing of consonants before voiceless consonants, liquids, or vowels: sat rośnie, sat urós, ukratem, zav́eśmi (zawieźmy)
7. w > v/f trój, kfiat, *χw > χv > χf > f fała (chwała)
8. mazurzenie: š ž č ǯ > s z c ʒ: scekać (szczekać, or a merger of the retroflexes and palatal sibilants into postalveolar: szcziekać, sziano
9. Old Polish ḷ > ł > u̯, especially in West Masovia
10. Hardening of Old Polish ľ > l even before i: lis
11. Decomposition of soft labials: ṕ, b́, f́, v́, ḿ > pš/pχ́, bž/bɣ́, vź, fś, mń: kurpχ́/karpś, pafχ́/ołófš́, mniasto, also śfat (świat), niedźwiedź (earlier mniedźwiedź)
12. Simplification of resulting clusters containing labials: ołóš́, źara (wiara), niasto
13. śř, źř > śr, źr, środa, źrėbåk
14. penultimate stress
15. Loss aje> ā, grai̯e > grā
16. preference for pochylone ȯ (kłȯtka, skȯlni)
17. ir > ėr, sėrce
18. *y > i, sin, dim, dwa ribi (compare decomposition of bilabials)
19. Fronting of Old Polish short ă, even softening velars, pråvdä, ḱäńå täg vołå, sometimes merging with e
  1. a > ä > e in some Old Polish texts
  2. i̯a- > i̯ä- > i̯e-: i̯epko
  3. ra- > rä- > re-: reno
  4. -ar- > -är- > -er-: umer, derń (compare also umárł)
  5. frequent and common *ěT > ä > e: osierze (ofiara)
  6. ăN > äN > śäno
20. á > a: dobra trawä
21. loss of the phonemically short nasal in short syllables into a front, middle nasal between a and e, indifferent to the width of the opening of ą̈: zą̈bi, sometimes going to ą (ćąsko) or ę (ćęsko), or sometimes denazalisation in unstressed codas or before sibilants (i̯azik, i̯ėnzik)
22. lost of the phonemically long nasal vowel ą̄ > ǫ and in regions touching Małopolska > ų, with frequent denasalization as above (kśůska)
23. -išče > -isko
24. spread of -isty, -asty
25. replacement of -’ev in soft stems with -’ov in the 16th century, and occasional hypercorrection to adding -’ev after hard stems: synev́i
26. establishment of od(-) (<*otъ) before vowels and liquids, od okna, odnaleźć in the 15th century
27. loss via analogy of mobile e: do Suvȧłk
28. spread of -ywać
29. replacement of neuter nouns ending in -ę with -ak: ćelȧk
30. replacement of -eć infinitives with -ić/-yć: lezyć
31. replacement of the superlative nȧ- with nai̯-
32. establishment of voiced z(-) before vowels and liquids: zleźć, z ńim
33. replacement of the locative plural -’eχ with -aχ in the middle of the 16th century
34. mixing of the dative endings -ov́i with -u > -ov́u: bratoźu, χłopakoɣ́u, wołoju
35. replacement of the genitive singular soft-stem ending -’e (<*-ě₃) with -i: z źä(m)ńi
36. replacement of the nominative/accusative neuter ending -ē < *-ьje with -ĕ with declensions from *-jo-: zboze
37. replacement of the genitive/locative adjective/pronoun plural ending -iχ with -ėχ
38. sporadic use of adjective/pronoun endings for some nouns
39. replacement of neuter/feminine dv́e with dva: dva krovi, dva okna
40. replacement of the ending -i for numerals from 5–10 with -u: z dvu, seśću, or ṕę̇ćuχ
41. replacement of ā < *ěja in preterite forms with the reflex of *ě by analogy: mńāł, mńăłă, mńeli
42. loss of -ui̯e, -ovać (-ivać) in some verbs: kupać, zlatać
43. loss of the dual with the dual form -ta replacing the second person plural: ńeśeta, ńeśta with -će being used for formal forms: ńeśeće
44. in some subdialects spread of the first person dual -va in the present: ńeśeva
45. in some subdialects replacement of the first person imperative -m with -my: ńeśmi or more often with -va: ńeźva, and occasional contamination of the two with -ma: neśma
46. in the first person compound past (nosił(a) + jeśḿ) > -eśḿ > -(e)m: nosiłem/uśatem
47. first person past: ńeśli(je)sm > neśliśmy, and also replacement with the dual: bẏliźva or -śma: nośiliśma
48. merger of masculine personal with masculine animal endings by spread of -y and -e
  1. regional replacement of -li with -ły: spałi (for m.pr and m.an)
  2. regional replacement of -ły with -li: spali (for m.pr and m.an)

== Bibliography ==
- Barbara Bartnicka (red.): Polszczyzna Mazowsza i Podlasia. Łomża-Warszawa 1993.
- Anna Basara: Studia nad wokalizmem w gwarach Mazowsza. Wrocław-Warszawa-Kraków 1965.
- Anna Cegieła: Polski Słownik terminologii i gwary teatralnej. Wrocław 1992.
- Jadwiga Chludzińska-Świątecka: Ze studiów nad słowotwórstwem gwar mazowieckich. Poradnik Językowy, z. 6, 1961, s. 253–258.
- Karol Dejna: Dialekty polskie. Ossolineum 1993.
- Barbara Falińska (red.): Gwary Mazowsza, Podlasia i Suwalszczyzny.ɴ I. Filipów, pow. Suwałki, Białystok, 2004.
- Województwo płockie. Uniwersytet Łódzki, Łódź-Płock 1984.
