= New mixed dialects =

Group of dialects of the Polish language

- nowe dialekty mieszane
- Native to: Poland
- Region: West Pomeranian Voivodeship; Lubusz Voivodeship; Lower Silesian Voivodeship; Pomeranian Voivodeship; Warmian-Masurian Voivodeship
- Language family: Indo-European: Balto-Slavic; Slavic; West Slavic; Lechitic; Polish; New mixed dialects
- Writing system: Latin (Polish alphabet)

Language codes
- ISO 639-3: –
- Glottolog: None
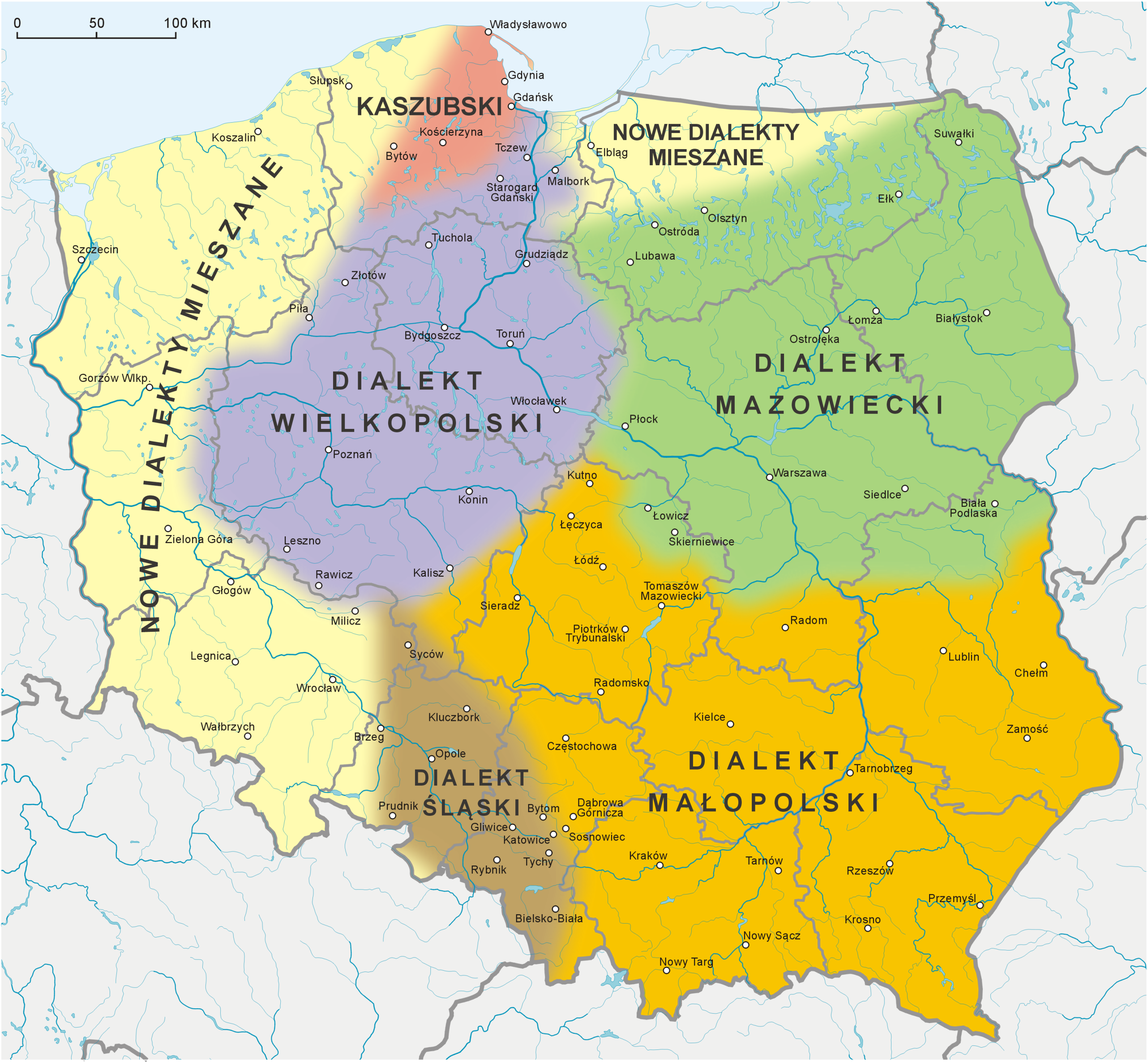
- Map of the dialects of Polish, including the New Mixed Dialects marked in pale yellow.

The new mixed dialects (Polish: nowe dialekty mieszane) is a group of koiné dialects of the Polish language, formed in the process of dialect levelling, that are nearly identical to the literary form of Standard Polish. They are present in Western and Northern Poland, mostly within the borders of voivodeships of West Pomerania, Lubusz, Lower Silesia, Pomerania, and the northern part of Warmian-Masurian Voivodeship, within the area historically described as Western Borderlands, but are also present in other areas.

== History ==
The dialects were formed after 1945, when, in the aftermath of World War II, the German-speaking population of the area later described as the Western Borderlands of Poland were expelled and replaced with a Polish-speaking one. Due to the differences in various dialects of newly introduced population, the locally spoken language underwent the process of dialect levelling, becoming nearly indistinguishable from the literary form of the Standard Polish. The area that underwent that process includes the western and northern parts of Poland, including modern voivodeships of West Pomerania, Lubusz, Lower Silesia, Pomerania, and northern part of Warmian-Masurian Voivodeship. They are also present in other areas, where they co-exist with other dialects.

== Dialects ==
According to linguist and academic Stanisław Urbańczyk, the new mixed dialects include 3 dialects, that are:

- Southern, with the domination of the influences from Lesser Poland dialect,
- Northwestern, with the domination of the influences from Greater Poland and Southern Borderlands dialects,
- Northern, with the domination of the influences from the Masovian and Northern Borderlands dialects.

== Citations ==
=== Sources ===
- Stanisław Urbańczyk: Zarys dialektologii polskiej. Warsaw: Państwowe Wydawnictwo Naukowe, 1976.
