= Pomeranian dialect =

Pomeranian dialect may refer to:

- East Pomeranian
- Central Pomeranian
- Mecklenburgisch-Vorpommersch
- Pomeranian language and Kashubian language, sometimes regarded as dialects of Polish
