= East Low German =

Dialect group

- Native to: Germany, Poland, Brazil
- Language family: Indo-European: Germanic; West Germanic; North Sea Germanic; Low German; East Low German

Language codes
- ISO 639-2: nds for Low German
- ISO 639-3: nds for Low German
- Glottolog: nort2627
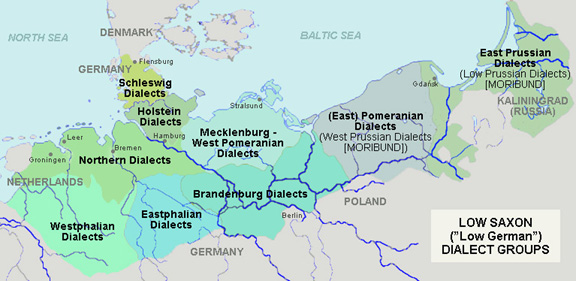
- Low German dialects. East Low German includes the four dialects in the east [Note: The map confuses East Pomeranian (cp. Farther Pomerania), West Prussian (cp. West Prussia) and East Prussian (cp. East Prussia).]

East Low German (German: ostniederdeutsche Dialekte, ostniederdeutsche Mundarten, Ostniederdeutsch) is a group of Low German dialects spoken in north-eastern Germany as well as by minorities in northern Poland and southern Brazil. Together with West Low German dialects, it forms a dialect continuum of the Low German language. Before 1945, the dialect was spoken along the entire then-German-settled Baltic Coast from Mecklenburg, through Pomerania, West Prussia into certain villages of the East Prussian Klaipėda Region.

East Pomeranian, Central Pomeranian and West Pomeranian should not be confused with the West Slavic Pomeranian language (German: Pomoranisch).

== Related languages ==
East Low German belongs to the dialect continuum of the West Germanic languages. It developed from the older Middle Low German.

In the West it fades into West Low German. The distinction is usually made referring to the plural endings of the verbs: East Low German endings are based on the old first person ending: -e(n), whereas West Low German endings are based on the old second person ending: -(e)t. The categorization of the Low German dialects into an Eastern and a Western group is not made by all linguists.

In the South, it fades into East Central German. The difference is that the East Low German varieties have not been affected by the High German consonant shift. The areas affected by the High German consonant shift are still expanding today, especially the Berlinerisch dialect that is gaining ground on the Brandenburgisch dialect by which it is surrounded.

== Dialects ==
East Low German dialects are:

- Mecklenburgisch-Vorpommersch (in Mecklenburg-Vorpommern)
- Brandenburgisch or Märkisch-Brandenburgisch (Brandenburgish; in Brandenburg, northern Saxony-Anhalt)
- Middle Pomeranian (Mittelpommersch)
- East Pomeranian (in Farther Pomerania)
- Low Prussian (in West Prussia and East Prussia)

For some it also includes Plautdietsch (originating from Danzig), which is spoken by Mennonites in North America, Mexico and a few other places in the world. In Berlin a version of Brandenburgisch was spoken in medieval times until the city took up an East Central German dialect that incorporated Brandenburgisch elements and developed into today's Berlin[er]isch.

Municipalities where East Pomeranian dialects are co-official in Espírito Santo, Brazil

The German dialects of Pomerania are compiled and described in the Pommersches Wörterbuch ("Pomeranian Dictionary"), a dictionary of the German dialects spoken within the Province of Pomerania's borders in 1936.

East Pomeranian dialect of East Low German is also spoken in Brazil (see Pomerode, in Santa Catarina, Santa Maria de Jetibá, in Espírito Santo, and Arroio do Padre, Morro Redondo, Turuçu, Canguçu, São Lourenço do Sul and Pelotas, in Rio Grande do Sul).

== History ==
By the early Middle Ages, Pomerania was largely populated by Slavic Pomeranians and Liuticians, who spoke the Pomeranian and Polabian languages. During the High Middle Ages, Germans from northern parts of the Holy Roman Empire settled in Pomerania as part of the medieval Ostsiedlung. Most Slavic Pomeranians gradually became Germanized. The new Pomeranian dialects which emerged from the admixture of the Low German dialects of the settlers are classified as East Low German.

After World War II, Germans east of the Oder-Neisse line were expelled to post-war Germany. Most varieties of East Pomeranian dialect have largely died out in the following decades as the expellees were assimilated into their new homes, although West Pomeranian and Central Pomeranian are still spoken in Vorpommern (Western or Hither Pomerania), part of the German state of Mecklenburg-Vorpommern.

As a result of German immigration to Brazil, there are still some communities speaking East Pomeranian in Rio Grande do Sul, Santa Catarina and Espírito Santo.

== Writers ==
Fritz Reuter and Heinrich Bandlow are among the most famous East Low German writers.

== See also ==
- Prussia
