= Hans Fischer (cyclist) =

Brazilian cyclist

Personal information
- Born: 29 January 1961 Pomerode, Santa Catarina, Brazil
- Died: December 13, 1988 (aged 27) Jaraguá do Sul, Santa Catarina, Brazil
- Height: 1.85 m (6 ft 1 in)

Cycling career
- Sport: Cycling

Hans Fischer (29 January 1961 –13 December 1988) was a Brazilian cyclist. He competed at the 1980 Summer Olympics and 1984 Summer Olympics.

== Biography ==
Fischer was born in Pomerode, Santa Catarina. He began pedaling at the age of five on an adult bike, regularly practicing in 1976 following medical advice after suffering a fall from a horse which fractured his knee.

He participated in the 1979 Pan American Junior Championship in Venezuela, where he won two gold medals, one silver, and one bronze. He also participated in two editions of the Olympic Games, representing Brazil in Moscow in 1980, and in Los Angeles in 1984.

He died from cardiac arrest in 1988 at the age of 27.
