= Tribsees =

Town in Mecklenburg-Vorpommern, Germany

- Town
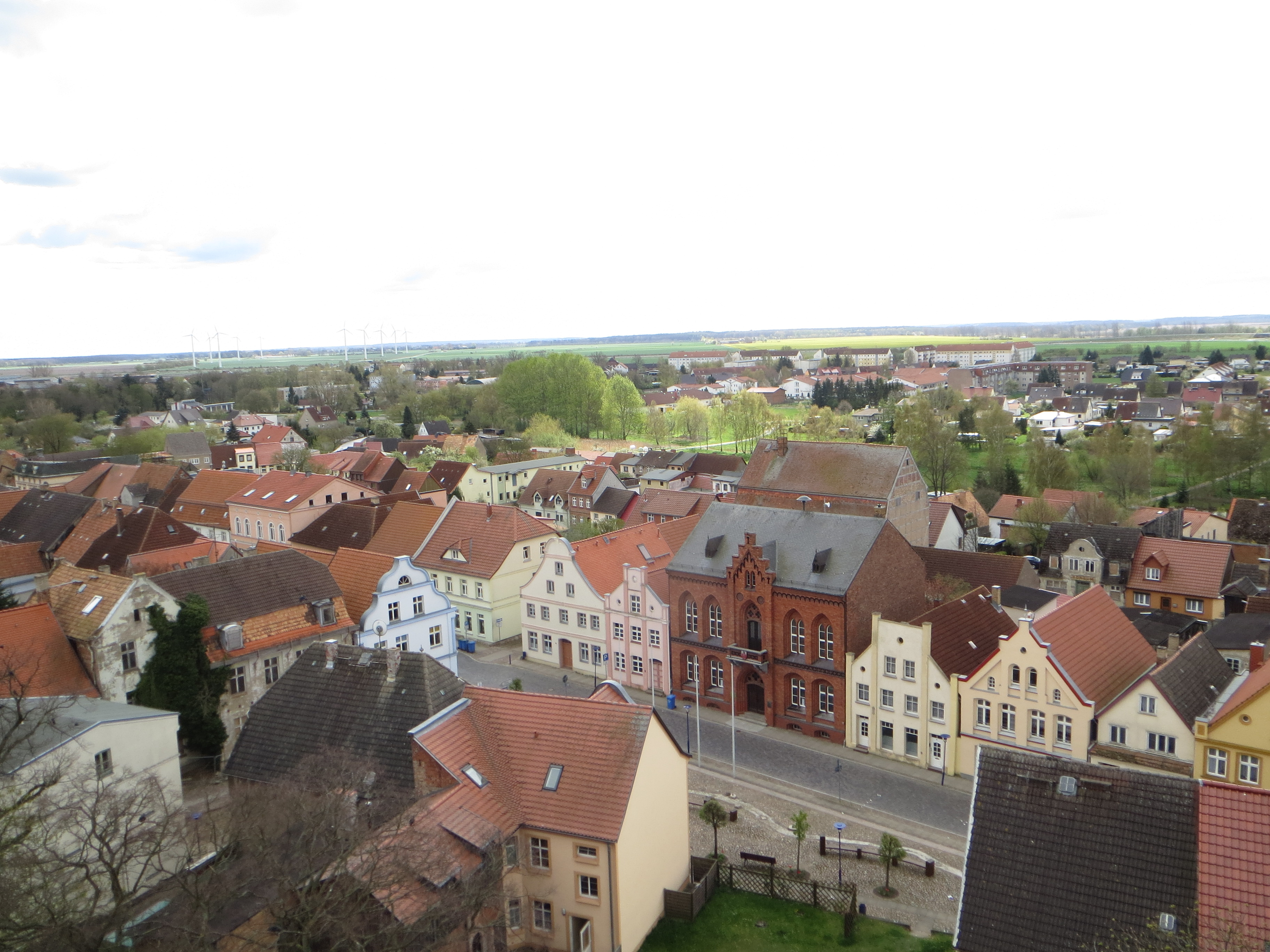
- View of Tribsees

- Coat of arms

- Location of Tribsees within Vorpommern-Rügen district
- Interactive map of Tribsees
- Location within Germany Location within Mecklenburg-Vorpommern
- Coordinates: 54°05′N 12°45′E
- Country: Germany
- State: Mecklenburg-Vorpommern
- District: Vorpommern-Rügen
- Municipal assoc.: Recknitz-Trebeltal
- Subdivisions: 5 Ortsteile

Government
  - Mayor: Bernhard Zieris (FW)

Area
  - Total: 54.98 km^{2} (21.23 sq mi)
- Elevation: 4 m (13 ft)

Population (2025-12-31)
  - Total: 2,483
  - Density: 45.16/km^{2} (117.0/sq mi)
- Time zone: UTC+01:00 (CET)
  - Summer (DST): UTC+02:00 (CEST)
- Postal codes: 18465
- Dialling codes: 038320
- Vehicle registration: NVP
- Website: www.stadt-tribsees.de

Tribsees (German pronunciation: [ˈtʁiːp.zeːs]) is a municipality in the Vorpommern-Rügen district, in Mecklenburg-Vorpommern, in north-eastern Germany. It is situated 33 kilometres (21 mi) southwest of Stralsund, and 40 kilometres (25 mi) east of Rostock.

== Etymology ==
The name may come from the Slavic word "treb" or "trebez" (Polish: "trzebiez") in the meaning of clearing. According to another version, the name came from a Slavic tribe (Tribeden) that inhabited the area in the early Middle Ages.

== History ==
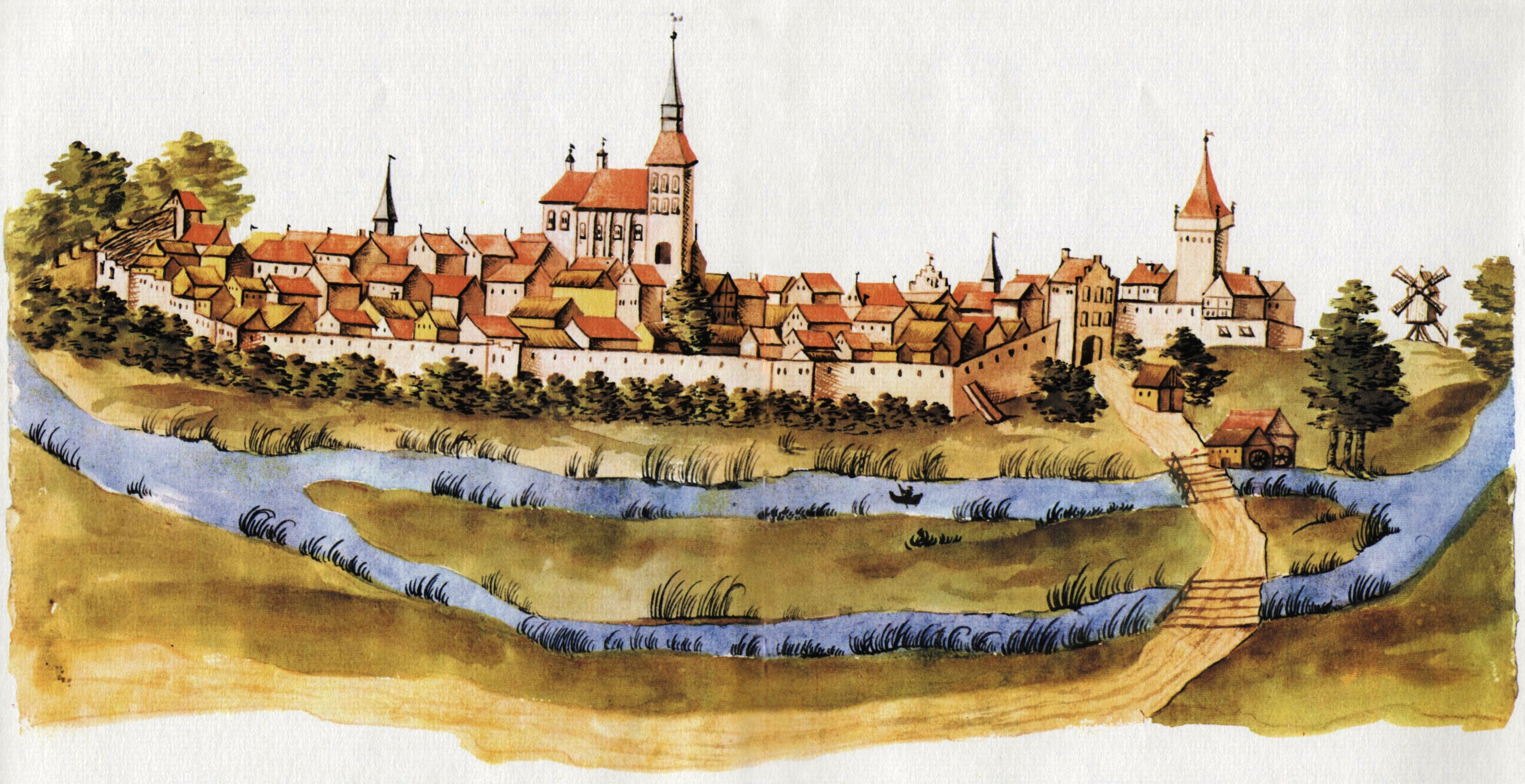
17th-century view of the town

The Tribeden are mentioned for the first time in 955. The Tribusses territory was mentioned in 1136, and the castle was incorporated by Pope Innocent II into the newly formed Bishopric of Wolin in 1140. It formed part of the Duchy of Pomerania, and around 1184 it passed to the Slavic Principality of Rügen, a vassal of Denmark. The town is mentioned in a document in Lübeck in 1241. In 1245 it is noted that the Neuenkamp monastery (Kloster Neuenkamp) had the right of patronage over the church in Tribsees. An agreement between the city council of Stralsund and that of Tribsees exists from 1267, and in 1285 the town was granted Lübeck law by Prince Vitslav II. In 1310 King Eric VI of Denmark granted the town to Margaret, wife of Prince Vitslav III, as a hereditary lease, reserving, however, the right of redemption if the prince died without male descendants. During the Wars of the Rügen Succession, in 1328 it passed to Mecklenburg, and in 1355 it became part of the Duchy of Pomerania.

During the Thirty Years' War, Albrecht von Wallenstein stayed in the town in 1628. In 1637 it was occupied the Holy Roman Empire, and in 1638 it was captured by Sweden, within which it remained. The town was almost completely destroyed in a fire in 1702, but subsequently rebuilt. In 1815 it passed to Prussia.

The town had 1,040 inhabitants in 1782. Roman Catholics were acknowledged in the town only in 1816 and Jews only in 1861. The town population reached its peak in 1861, when there were 3,692 inhabitants in Tribsees. By 1885, it declined to 2,950. In the late 19th century, the inhabitants were mostly employed in agriculture and cattle breeding. Grain was sold to Hamburg, whereas cattle to Berlin.

In the final months of World War II, in 1945, the town surrendered without a fight to Soviet troops.

== Landmarks ==
The town church dates from the Middle Ages, it was mentioned for the first time in 1245. It is a Brick Gothic building but has been damaged through fire and war on several occasions throughout its history. In 1861 – 1869 it was renovated in a Neo-Gothic style. The church houses an unusual altarpiece from the early 15th century. It displays the transubstantiation in an allegorical form as a mill operated by angels. The elaborate altarpiece contains 67 sculpted wooden figures, painted and covered with gold leaf.

Two medieval town gates still mark the entrance to the centre of Tribsees, the Mühlentor ("mill gate") and Steintor ("stone gate"). Both date from the 13th century and were originally part of more extensive fortifications which have since disappeared.

== Economy ==
The economy of the town is dominated by small and medium-sized enterprises. There are two wind farms operating in Tribsees.

== Notable people ==
- Johann Joachim Spalding (1 November 1714 – 25 May 1804), theologian and philosopher
- Heinrich Bandlow (14 April 14, 1855 – 25 August 1933), writer
- Manfred Bleskin (13 December 1949 – 21 January 2014), journalist

== Gallery ==
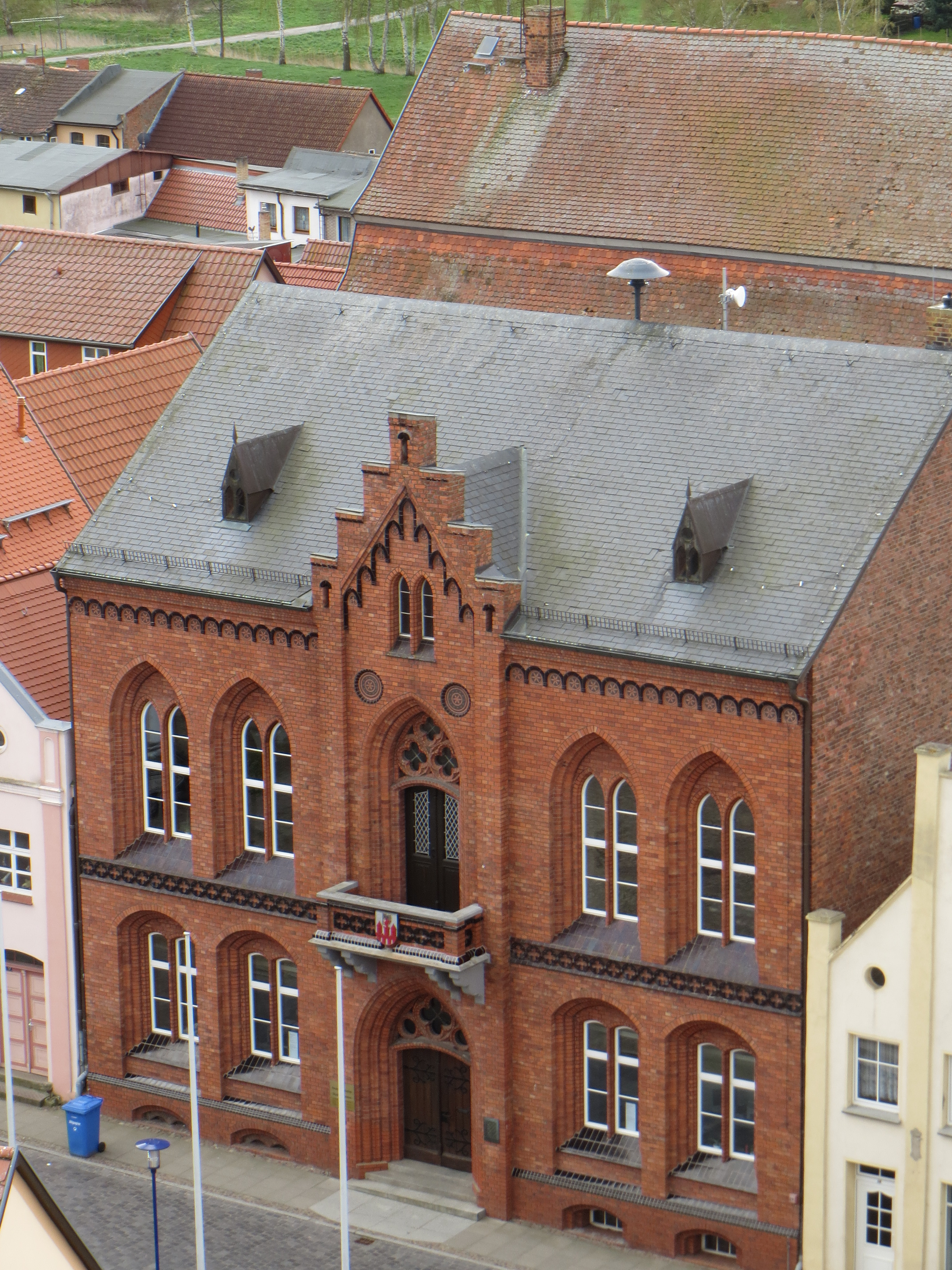
Town hall

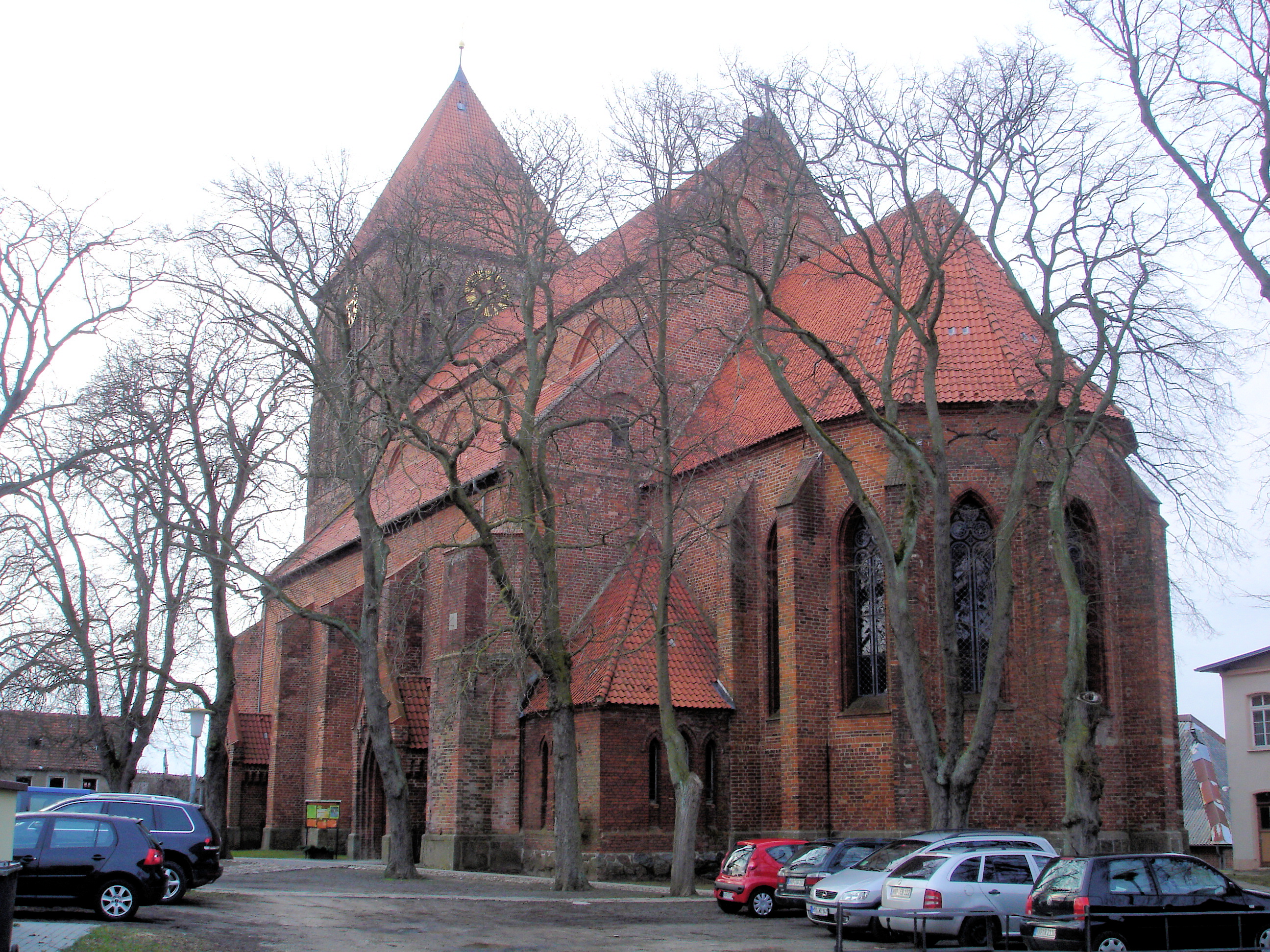
Town church

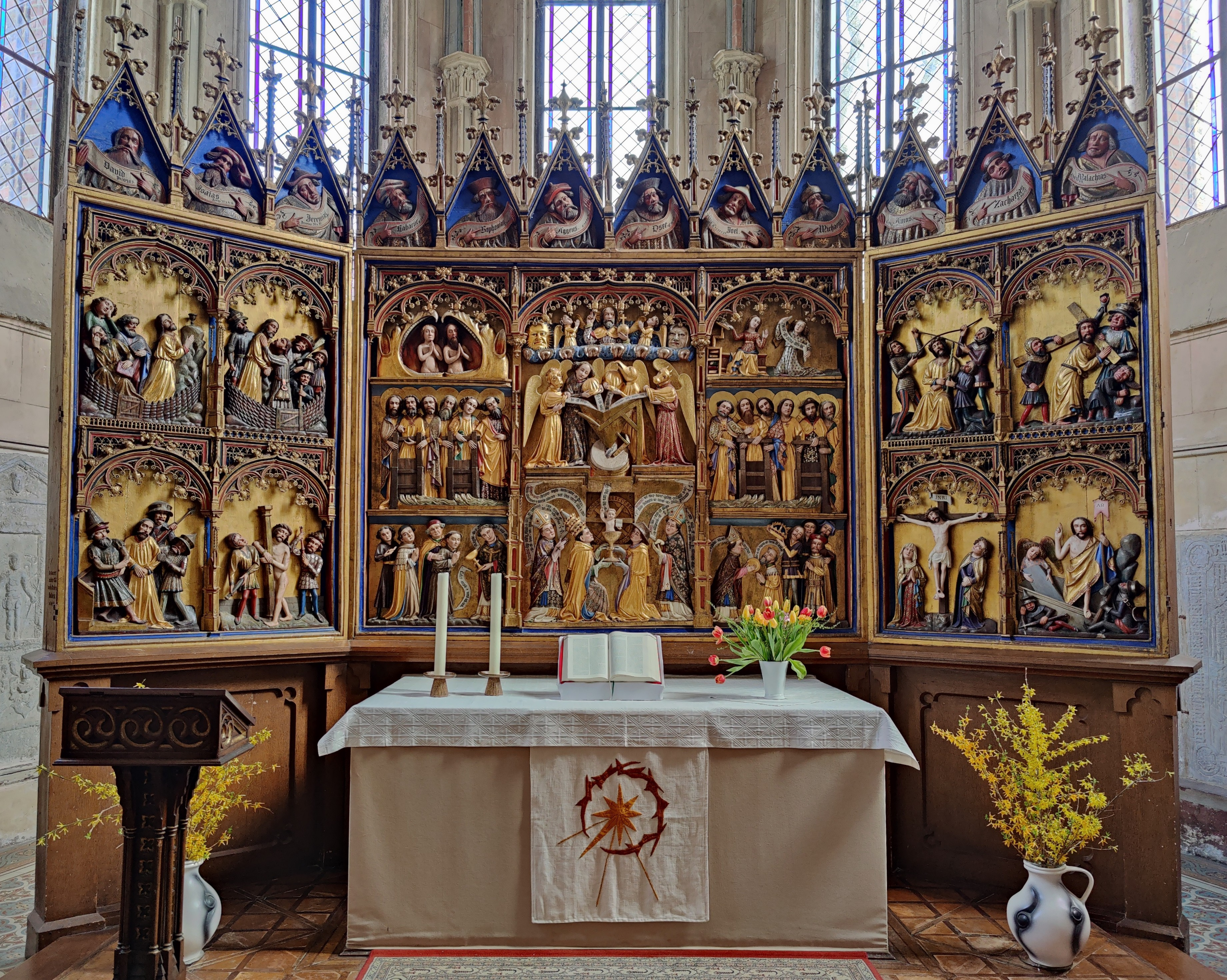
The unusual medieval altarpiece in the church

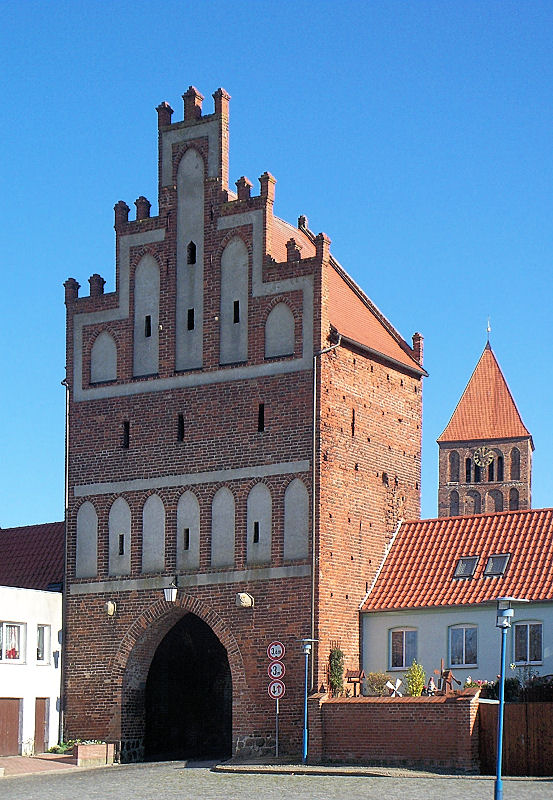
Mühlentor ("mill gate")

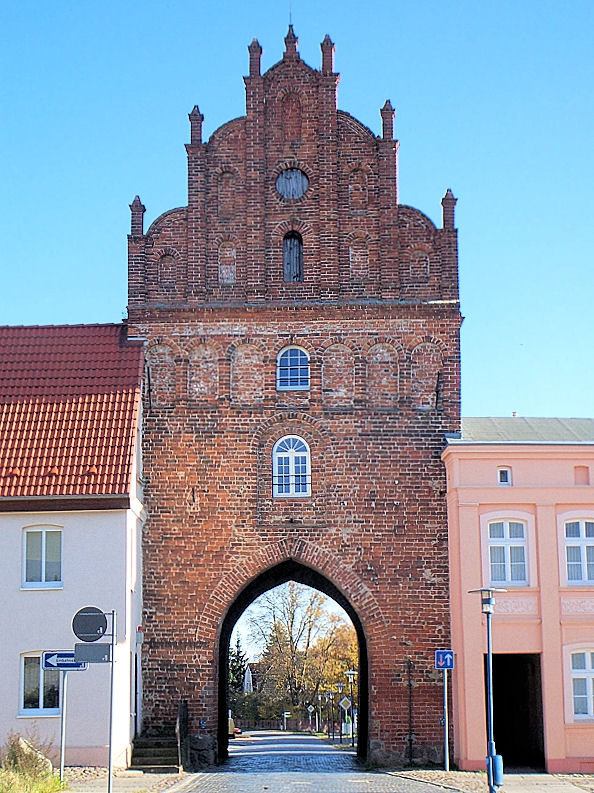
Steintor ("stone gate")
