= Marlon Teixeira =

Brazilian fashion model

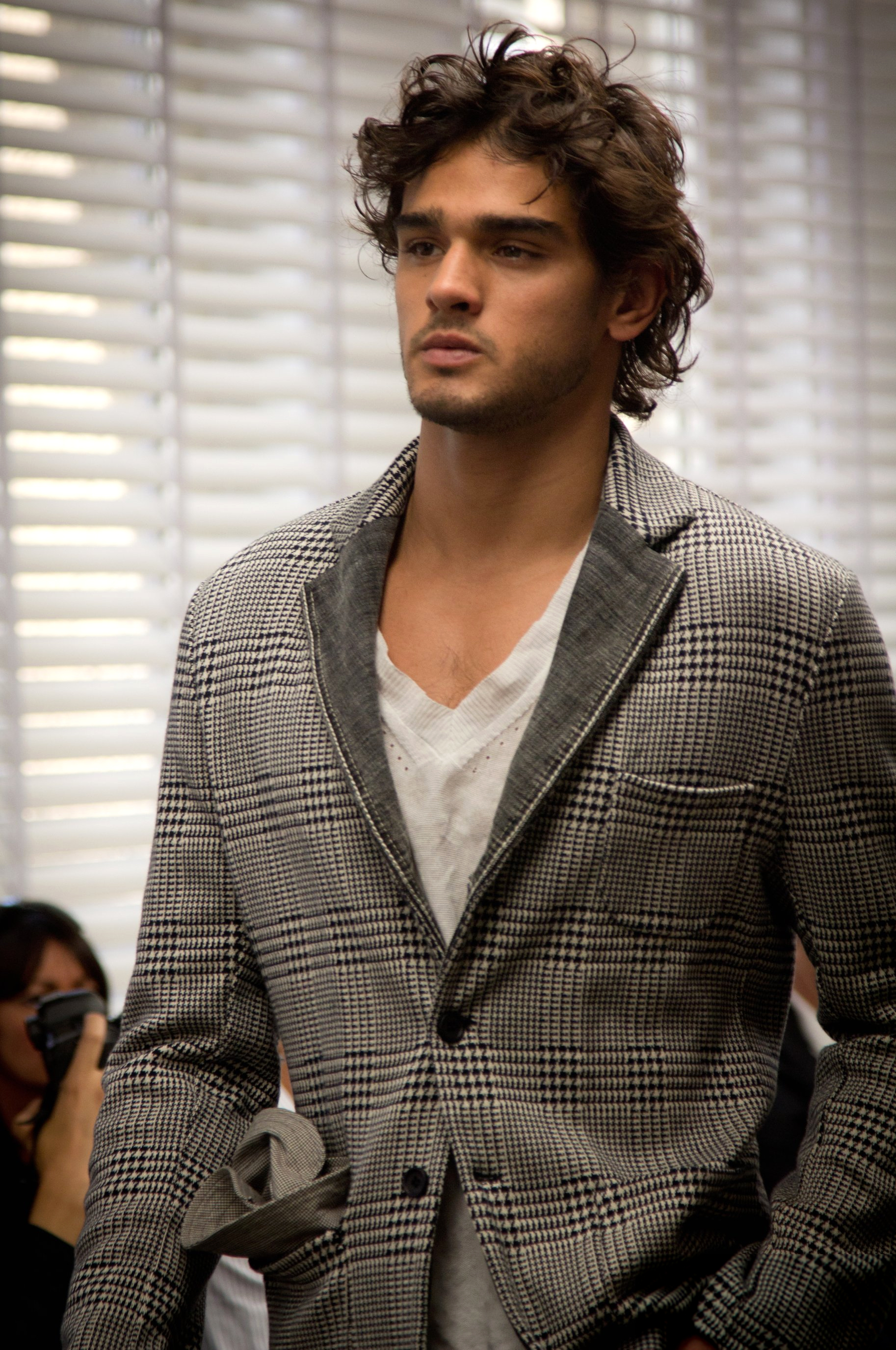
- Teixeira in 2012
- Born: Marlon Luiz Teixeira; September 16, 1991 (age 34); Pomerode, Santa Catarina, Brazil
- Occupation: Model
- Children: 1
- Parent: Claudia Teixeira
- Modelling information
- Height: 6 ft 1 1/2 in (1.87 m)
- Hair colour: Brown
- Eye colour: Hazel
- Agency: Wilhelmina Models (New York); Marilyn Agency (Paris); Elite Milan (Milan); Next London (London); Sight Management Studio (Barcelona); Scoop Models (Copenhagen); Modelwerk (Hamburg); Way Model Management (São Paulo); Kult Australia (Sydney); Wilhelmina Agency (Los Angeles); Wilhelmina Agency (Miami); Wilhelmina Agency (Chicago); The Society Management (New York)

Marlon Luiz Teixeira (born September 16, 1991) is a Brazilian fashion model.

== Career ==
He started his career when his grandmother introduced him to Anderson Baumgartner, owner of Way Model Management and friend of the family.

He has walked for numerous shows including Chanel, Balmain, Emporio Armani, Dolce & Gabbana, DSquared², Roberto Cavalli, Jean Paul Gaultier and many more and opened for shows such as Emporio Armani and Dior Homme. Marlon has also appeared on several magazine covers L'Officiel Hommes, Essential Homme, Fiasco, Made in Brazil, Client, and Hercules. Alongside this he has appeared in high fashion editorials for GQ, Vogue Espana, V, Elle, W magazine with Ginnifer Goodwin and Vanity Fair with Shakira.

In 2011, Teixeira became the face of new Diesel fragrance "Diesel Fuel for Life Denim Collection" together with Dutch model Marloes Horst. The ad campaign was shot by Terry Richardson and video campaign is directed by Melina Matsoukas.

He was formerly ranked in the Top 50 by models.com. He is currently ranked Trending Men, Top Icons Men, Sexiest Men, Next Generation on Models.com list of the international male models. He was one of Yahoo's Hottest Male Models of 2015.

He took part in Philip Kirkorov's video-clip, “Snow”.

Awards:

- Muzt TV Awards 2012 (Philipp Kirkorov - Snow)
- Portugal Fashion Awards 2012 (BEST NEW FACE MODEL: Marlon Teixeira)
- LIA Awards - Silver 2011 (Diesel Fuel for Life Denim Collection)
- Clio Awards - Bronze 2012 (Diesel Fuel for Life Denim Collection)

== Personal life ==
Teixeira is of Portuguese, Japanese and Indigenous descent. (Note: Some English sources have stated that Marlon is of Portuguese, Japanese and Indian descent. The ambiguous meaning of the word "Indian" in English has led some of his fans to believe that one or more of his ancestors originated from India. In Portuguese such ambiguity is nonexistent, since there are two words to convey the different meanings: índio for an American Indian (or Amerindian, including Native Brazilians); and indiano for people and things related to India.) He lives in Praia Brava - Itajaí SC but he travels often. He previously lived in New York City but as of 2025 had property in both Brazil and Bali.

He has a daughter.
