= Hamburg German =

Northern Low Saxon dialects of Germany

- Hamburg dialect, Hamburger dialect
- Hamborger Platt
- Region: Hamburg
- Language family: Indo-European: Germanic; West Germanic; North Sea Germanic; Low German; West Low German; Northern Low Saxon; Hamburg German
- Writing system: German alphabet

Language codes
- ISO 639-3: –
- IETF: nds-u-sd-dehh

Hamburg German, also known as Hamburg dialect or Hamburger dialect (natively Hamborger Platt, German: Hamburger Platt), is a group of Northern Low Saxon varieties spoken in Hamburg, Germany. Occasionally, the term Hamburgisch is also used for Hamburg Missingsch, a variety of standard German with Low Saxon substrates. These are urban dialects that have absorbed numerous English and Dutch loanwords, for instance Törn 'trip' (< turn) and suutje 'gently' (< Dutch zoetjes).

Hamburg's name is pronounced [ˈhambɔːç] in these dialects, with a "ch" similar to that in the standard German words ich or Milch (ich-Laut). Typical of the Hamburg dialects and other Lower Elbe dialects is the [ɔɪ̯] pronunciation (and eu spelling) for the diphthong /œɪ/ (written öö, öh or ö), e.g.:

in Hamburg	elsewhere	standard German	English translation
keupen [ˈkʰɔɪ̯pm̩]	köpen [ˈkʰœɪ̯pm̩]	kaufen [ˈkʰaʊ̯fn̩]	to buy
scheun [ʃɔɪ̯n]	schöön [ʃœɪ̯n]	schön [ʃøːn]	beautiful

However, as in most other Low Saxon dialects, the long monophthong /øː/ is pronounced [øː] (as in French peu), for instance Kööm ~ Kœm [kʰøːm] 'caraway'.

The Low Saxon language in Hamburg is divided in several subdialects, namely:

- Finkwarder Platt
- Olwarder Platt
- Veerlanner Platt (with many sub-sub-dialects)
- Barmbeker Platt.

The Hamborger Veermaster is a famous sea shanty sung in the regional dialect. The all-purpose greeting "moin" is universally used in Hamburg.

== Sources ==
- Christoph, Walther; Lasch, Agathe; Kuhn, Hans; Pretzel, Ulrich; Scheel, Käthe; Meier, Jürgen; Möhn, Dieter (1985–2006), Hamburgisches Wörterbuch (2 ed.), Neumünster: K. Wachholtz, OCLC 182559541 (in German and Low German)
