= Missingsch =

Dialect of German

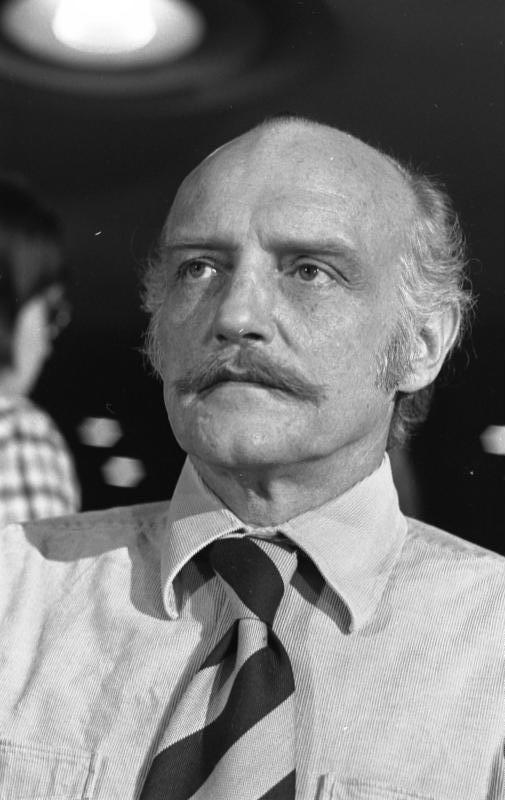
- The author Jochen Steffen who wrote in the Kiel variant of Missingsch
- Pronunciation: German pronunciation: [ˈmɪsɪŋʃ]
- Region: Germany
- Language family: Indo-European: Germanic; West Germanic; North Sea Germanic; Low Germanic; Missingsch

Language codes
- ISO 639-3: –

Missingsch (German pronunciation: [ˈmɪsɪŋʃ]) is a type of Low-German-coloured dialect or sociolect of German. It is characterised by Low-German-type structures and the presence of numerous calques and loanwords from Low German in High German.

== Description ==
A more technical definition of Missingsch is that it is a type of contact variety, specifically a type of German variety with a Low German (or Low Saxon) substratum. That is the result of linguistic, cultural, educational and political Germanisation of the region that is now Northern Germany. The process of Germanisation began in earnest in the late 17th century, after the demise of the Hanseatic League and thus the erosion of its Middle-Saxon-speaking power. Pressures to adopt German but being held back by insufficient access to formal (by now solely-German) education in the lower social classes led to various stages of transition from Low German to High German. The generally low-prestige language varieties continued to be spoken and rarely written until the late 20th century, but some people still continue and promote them now, very often for their supposed entertainment value, typically in comical veins.

Perhaps the best-known remaining domain of Missingsch is that of "Klein Erna jokes" — usually told entirely in Missingsch — in which laconic humour glorifies low-class wit and comments on working class conditions; e.g.

- Mamma aus'n Fenster: "Klein Erna, muscha die Katze nich immer an Schwanz ziehn!" Klein Erna: "Tu ich scha auch gaa nich. Die Katze zieht immer, ich halt ihr bloß fest!" (Mum callin' down from the window: "Li'l Erna, stop pullin' the cat's tail, will ya?!" Li’l Erna: "But it ain't me doin' it! The cat keeps pullin'. I'm jus' holdin' 'er.")
- Mamma: "Klein Erna, komm ra-auf, Füße waschen, Mamma braucht die Kumme gleich zu Sala-at!" (Mum: "Li'l Erna, come on upstai-airs! Time to wash yer fee-eet! Mum needs the bowl for saaalad!")
- Klein Erna geht mit ihr'n Heini in Dunkeln spazieren. Und wie sie inne Gegend von Bismarckdenkmal sind und 'n büschen rumknutschen, sagt Klein Erna mit'n mal: "Heini, wis ma sehn, wo ich an Blinddaam opariert bin?" "O ja, Klein Erna, zeig mal her!" "Kuck mal, da unten, wo die vielen Lichter brennen, da is das Hafenkrankenhaus. Da bin ich an Blinddaam opariert!" (Li'l Erna's walkin' with 'er Ricky in the dark. An' as they're by the Bismarck Memorial an' are doin' a bit o' knoodlin', says Erna, "Say, Ricky, d'ya wanna see where I had my appendix out?" "Oh, yes, Li'l Erna. Come on! Show me!" "Look, down there, where all the lights are, that's where the Harbour Hospital is. That's where I had my appendix out.")

From a linguistic point of view, Missingsch varieties did not become extinct as such. They merely developed into northern varieties more closely related to Standard German, varieties that use numerous Missingsch elements, especially in their casual registers. As such, Missingsch has been influencing the development of Standard German, mostly indirectly by way of northern German dialect contributions. Obvious examples are Low Saxon loanwords such as tschüß 'bye' (compare Low Saxon: adschüüß, tschüüß). However, most influences are not as clearly noticeable as they involve lexical and idiomatic choices. A case of lexical choice is Sonnabend (compare Low Saxon Sünnavend and Standard German Sonnabend, Samstag) 'Saturday'.

There are numerous parallel cases to that of Missingsch. These are found in many situations in which languages came to be supplanted by other languages. Within a Northern European context there is the case of Stadsfries in the northern parts of the Netherlands and the case of sociolects of Scottish English that have particularly strong characteristics of Scots.

While there have been many varieties of Missingsch throughout Northern Germany, those of larger cities are best known, such as those of Hamburg, Bielefeld, Bremen, Flensburg and Danzig.

The name Missingsch refers to the city of Meissen (Meißen), which lies outside the traditional Saxon-speaking region (although the state in which it is situated at one time acquired the misleading name Saxony, originally the name of what is now Northern Germany). Meissen's Central German dialect was considered exemplary and was highly influential between the fifteenth century and the establishment of Modern Standard German.

Missingsch is not a dialect of Low German. Furthermore, it is also not simply High German with a Low German accent, as it is often described. Its Low German/Low Saxon influences are not restricted to its phonology but involve also morphological and syntactic structures (sentence construction), as well as its lexicon (vocabulary). It is a type of German variety with the minimally qualifying characteristic of a clearly noticeable Low German/Low Saxon substratum.

Traditional German varieties of Berlin qualify as Missingsch as well, though few people today think of Berlinerisch as a Missingsch variety. Berlin is still surrounded by traditionally Low-German-speaking areas of the southeastern or Brandenburg type. Before it became the centre of Prussia, Berlin too was Low-German-speaking. As such, it adopted German earlier than other northern centres. Typical Berlinerisch is thus technically a Missingsch group with an additional Western Slavic (probably Old Lower Sorbian) substratum since before Saxon and Low Franconian colonisation, the area was Slavic-speaking.

In his novel Schloss Gripsholm, Kurt Tucholsky broaches the issue of Missingsch and provides samples.

== Phonological characteristics ==
- Missingsch phonology tends to be closely related, if not identical, to that of the corresponding Low Saxon varieties. Noteworthy among these in the Northern Low Saxon area are the following:
  - Long /aː/ is pronounced as a weakly rounded back vowel [ɒː] as in most Low Saxon varieties; e.g. Abend [ʔɒːmt] ~ [ʔɒːmp] (Standard [ˈʔaːbn̩t]) 'evening', Straßenbahn [ˈstrɒːsm̩bɒːn] (Standard [ˈʃtʁaːsn̩baːn]) 'tramway', 'streetcar'.
  - Short vowels are lengthened before sonorants, without any other change of articulation; e.g. Ball [baˑl] 'ball', Kind [kʰɪ̃ˑnt] 'child', auch [ʔaˑʊ̯x] 'also', Land [lãˑnt] 'land', 'country'.
  - There is a noticeable degree of nasalisation before syllable-final nasal consonants; Kind [kʰɪ̃ˑnt] 'child', Köm [kʰø̃ːm] 'caraway schnapps', lang [lãˑŋ] 'long'.
  - /d/ is assimilated to preceding /n/; e.g. Kinder = Kinner [kʰɪ̃ˑnɐ] 'children', anders = anners [ʔãˑnɐs] 'different'.
  - In original Missingsch, as in most Low Saxon varieties, syllable-initial /s/ followed by /p/ or /t/ does not take on a /ʃ/ sound; e.g. Straße [ˈstrɒːse] (Standard [ˈʃtʁaːsə], Low Saxon Straat [ˈstrɒːt]) 'street', Sprache [ˈsprɒːxe] (Standard [ʃpʁaːxə], Low Saxon Spraak [ˈsprɒːk]) 'language'. This pronunciation is now rare, at least among younger speakers.
  - What are word-initial affricate consonants (z and pf) in standard German tend to be fricative in Missingsch; e.g. Zeit [saˑɪ̯t] 'time', Pferd [feɐ̯t] 'horse' (cf. Standard Zeit [tsaɪ̯t], Pferd [pfɛɐ̯tʰ]). While this is now less common with z, it is prevails with pf (in which case it also occurs in Central German areas, which also do not feature the distinctly Upper German pf).
  - Aspiration of voiceless stops and affricates is limited to the syllable with main stress; e.g. Pocke [ˈpʰɔke] (Standard [ˈpʰɔkʰə]) 'pock', pikant [piˈkʰãˑnt] (Standard [pʰiˈkʰant]) 'spicy', Peter [ˈpʰeːtɐ] (Standard [ˈpʰeːtʰɐ]) 'Peter', Papa [ˈpʰapa] (Standard [ˈpʰapʰaː] or [pʰaˈpʰaː]) 'dad'. (Unaspirated variants tend to be heard and spelled as voiced by the average North German, hence the spelling Pogge, Peder and Pabba.)
  - Syllable-final /r/ is realized as a vowel and merges with certain preceding vowels; e.g. fertig [ˈfɛæ̯tɪç] ~ [ˈfɛɐ̯tɪç] 'ready’', ‘completed’, warten [ˈvaːtn̩] ~ [ˈvɒːtn̩] 'to wait', Korb [kʰɔɐ̯p] ~ [kʰɔːp] 'basket', Körper [ˈkʰœæ̯pɐ] 'body'
  - Preceding a syllable-final velar consonant, /l/ tends to change into a high vowel; e.g. Milch [mɪˑi̯ç] (Standard [mɪlç]) 'milk', Balken [ˈbaˑɪ̯kŋ̩] (Standard [ˈbalkn̩]) 'beam', solch [zɔˑɪ̯ç] (Standard [ˈzɔlç]) 'such', welk [vɛˑi̯k] (Standard [vɛlkʰ]) 'withered', Erfolg [ʔɐˈfɔˑɪ̯ç] (Standard [ʔɛɐ̯ˈfɔlkʰ]) 'success'. (Similar cases of assimilation of /l/ can be observed in Bavarian German).
  - Final /ɡ/ is always pronounced as a fricative, and the preceding vowel is usually short; e.g. richtig [ˈrɪçtɪç] (southern [ˈrɪçtɪɡ]) 'correct', Tag [tʰax] (southern [tʰaːɡ]) 'day', Berg [bɝːç] 'mountain', 'hill', Zug [tsʊx] ~ [sʊx] (southern [tsuːɡ]) 'train', 'draught', weg [vɛç] (southern [vɛɡ]) 'away', but Weg [veːç] (southern [veːɡ]) 'way' (cf. Low Saxon: richtig [ˈrɪçtɪç] 'correct', Dag [dax] 'day', Barg [baːx] 'mountain', 'hill', Tog [tʰɔx] 'train', 'draught', weg [vɛç] 'away', but Weg [vɛç] 'way’'vs Weeg’ [veːˑj] ~ [veːç] 'ways'). To express this orthographically, many people spell these richtich, Tach, Berch, Zuch, wech and Weech respectively (in Low Saxon richtich, Dach, Barch, Toch, wech, Wech and Weeg ~ Weech respectively).
  - In original Missingsch, syllable-initial /r/ is apical ([r], as in Italian and as in original Low Saxon). Uvular /r/ ([ʁ], as in Standard French, Danish and Modern Hebrew) became acceptable with advanced Germanisation. (The same happened to Low Saxon in some communities.)

== Lexical characteristics ==
- Missingsch uses numerous Low Saxon words and expressions:
  - phonologically adapted loans; e.g.
    - Buddel [ˈbʊdl̩] (< Low Saxon Buddel [ˈbʊdl̩], cf. Standard German Flasche) 'bottle'
    - dröge ~ dröög ~ drööch '(awfully) dry' (e.g. food), 'boring' (< Low Saxon dröge [ˈdrøˑɪ̯ɡe] ~ dröög’ [ˈdrøːɪ̯j] 'dry') in addition to ordinary German-based trocken [ˈtrɔkŋ̩] 'dry'
    - Fahrtuch [ˈfɒːtux] (< Low Saxon Fahrdook [ˈfɒːdɔʊk], cf. German Wischtuch) 'cleaning rag'
    - Klöterbüchse [ˈkløːtɐˌbʏkse] (< Low Saxon Klœterbüx(e) [ˈklœːtɐˌbʏks(e)] ~ [ˈkløːtɐˌbʏks(e)], Standard German Rassel) '(baby) rattle'
    - Schiet [ʃiːt] inoffensive for 'dirt', 'inferior stuff', 'problem', 'nuisance', 'nonsense' (< Low Saxon Schiet with the same meanings) in addition to the offensive German-based cognate Scheiße 'shit', 'crap'
    - Sott [ˈzɔt] ~ Sutt [ˈzʊt] (< Low Saxon Sott [ˈzɔt] ~ Sutt [ˈzʊt], cf. Standard German Ruß) (1) 'soot', (2) 'luck'
    - Sottje [ˈzɔtje] ~ [ˈzɔtʃe] ~ Suttje [ˈzʊtje] ~ [ˈzʊtʃe] (< Low Saxon Sottje [ˈzɔtje] ~ [ˈzɔtʃe] ~ Suttje [ˈzʊtje] ~ [ˈzʊtʃe] < Sott [ˈzɔt] ~ Sutt [ˈzʊt]; 'soot', cf. Standard German Schornsteinfeger) 'chimney-sweep'
  - calques and semi-calques; e.g.
    - Bickbeere [ˈbɪkˌbeːre] (< Low Saxon Bickbeer [ˈbɪkbeːr] ~ [ˈbɪkbɛːr], cf. Standard German Blaubeere, Heidelbeere) 'blueberry'
    - Blumenpott [ˈbluːm(ː)pɔt] (< Low Saxon Blomenpott [ˈblɔˑʊ̯m(ː)pɔt], cf. Standard German Blumentopf) 'flowerpot'
    - Grünhöker [ˈɡryːnhøːkɐ] (< Low Saxon Gröönhœker [ˈɡrœɪ̯nhøːkɐ] ~ [ˈɡrɔˑɪ̯nhøːkɐ], cf. Standard German Gemüsehändler) 'greengrocer'
    - Grünzeug [ˈɡryːntsɔˑɪ̯ç] ~ [ˈɡryːnsɔˑɪ̯ç] (< Grööntüüg [ˈɡrœɪ̯ntyːç] ~ [ˈɡrɔˑɪ̯ntyːç], cf. Standard German Gemüse) 'vegetable(s)'
    - Handstein [ˈhaˑn(t)staˑɪ̯n] ~ [ˈhaˑn(t)ʃtaˑɪ̯n] (< Low Saxon Handsteen [ˈhaˑn(t)stɛˑɪ̯n], cf. Standard German Waschbecken) 'wash basin'
    - Kantstein [ˈkʰaˑn(t)staˑɪ̯n] ~ [ˈkʰaˑn(t)ʃtaˑɪ̯n] (< Low Saxon Kantsteen [ˈkʰaˑn(t)stɛˑɪ̯n], cf. Standard German Bordstein) 'curb stone'
    - Stickhusten [ˈstɪkˌhuːstn̩] ~ [ˈʃtɪkˌhuːstn̩] (< Low Saxon Stickhoosten [ˈstɪkˌhɔʊ̯stn̩], cf. Standard German Keuchhusten) 'whooping cough'
    - Wurzel [ˈvʊˑɐ̯tsl̩] ~ [ˈvʊˑɐ̯sl̩] (< Low Saxon Wortel [ˈvɔˑɐ̯tl̩] ~ Wottel [ˈvɔtl̩], literally ‘root’) 'carrot' (cf. Standard German Möhre 'carrot', Wurzel 'root')
    - zus(ch)nacken [ˈtsʰuːˌsnakŋ̩] ~ [ˈtsʰuːˌʃnakŋ̩] ~ [ˈsuːˌsnakŋ̩] ~ [ˈsuːˌʃnakŋ̩] (< Low Saxon tosnacken [ˈtʰɔˑʊ̯ˌsnakŋ̩], cf. Standard German zureden, ermuntern) 'encourage'

Many of the above-mentioned words are used in casual-style Northern German dialects that descended from Missingsch at least in part.

== Morphological and syntactic characteristics ==
- as in some Low Saxon dialects, no distinctive marking for dative case and accusative case, using one or the other German marker for both cases; e.g.
  - Wenn du mich (dat.) das nich geben tus(t), denn kanns(t) du mich (acc.) nich besuchen or Wenn du mir (dat.) das nich geben tus(t), denn kanns(t) du mir (acc.) nich besuchen (cf. Low Saxon: Wenn du mi dat nich geven deihs(t), denn kanns(t) (du) mi nich besöken, Standard German: Wenn du es mir nicht gibst, darfst du mich nicht besuchen.) 'If you don't give it to me (dat.) you may not visit me (acc.).'
- Genitive constructions are as in Low Saxon; e.g.
  - seine Deerns Fernseher, seine Deern ihr Fernseher, der Fernseher von seine Deern (cf. Low Saxon: sien Deerns Feernseher, sien Deern ehr Feernseher, de Feernseher vun sien Deern, Standard German: der Fernsehapparat seiner Freundin) 'his girlfriend's television set'
- In the Northern Low Saxon area, Missingsch uses das for both 'that' (Standard German das, Low Saxon dat) and 'it' (Standard German es, Low Saxon it, in some dialects dat); e.g.
  - Ich mach das nich. (cf. Low Saxon: Ik mag dat nich.) 1. 'I don't like that.' (Standard German: Ich mag das nicht, Mir gefällt das nicht.), 2. 'I don't like it.' (Standard German: Ich mag es nicht, Mir gefällt es nicht.) (N.B.: The Missingsch sentence Ich mach das nich can also mean 'I don't do that/it', because what in Standard German is (ich) mag ([mɑːk]) '(I) like' in Missingsch coalesces with what in Standard German is (ich) mache ([ˈmaxə]) '(I) make'.)
- tun ‘do’ used to emphasise verbs; e.g.
  - Arbeiten tu ich heute nich. (cf. Low Saxon: Arbeiden do ik vundaag nich, Standard German: Ich arbeite heute nicht.) 'I don't work today (but I do something else).'
  - Tu ihn das man mal geben! (cf. Low Saxon: Do em dat man mal geven!, Standard German: Gib es ihm nur!) 'Do give it to him!', 'Go on and give it to him!'
- man (< Low Saxon man 'only', cf. Standard German nur ‘only’) used to signal permission, advice or mild command; e.g.
  - Denn komm Sie man rein! (cf. Low Saxon: Denn kümmt (Se) man rin!, Standard German: Dann kommen Sie nur herein!) 'Come on inside then!'
  - Lass ihr man! (cf. Low Saxon: Laat ehr man!, Standard German Lasse sie nur!) 'You'd better let her be', 'Don't mind her!', 'Forget about her!'
- Da (there) and hier (here) are not compounded with a following prepositions; e.g.
  - Da habbich kein Geld für (cf. Low Saxon: Dor heff ik keen Geld för, Standard German: Dafür habe ich kein Geld.) 'I don't have any money (to spare) for that/it.'
  - Hast (du) da was gegen?, Hassa was gegen? (cf. Low Saxon: Hest (du) dor wat gegen?, Standard German: Hast du etwas dagegen?) 'Do you have anything against that/it?', 'Are you opposed to that/it?', 'Do you have any objection?'
  - Da! Hier kannst dir maal was Schönes von kaufen. (cf. Low Saxon: Dor! Hier kannst di mal wat Schööns vun köpen. Standard German: Da! Hiervon kannst du dir einmal etwas Schönes kaufen.) 'Here you go! Buy yourself something nice with this.'
- development of the prepositions auf [ʔaˑʊ̯f] op, an and zu [ˈtsʰuː] ~ [ˈsuː] 'to' to adjectives denoting 'open' and 'closed', as happened in Low Saxon with corresponding up [ʔʊp] ~ op [ʔɔp] and to [ˈtʰɔˑʊ̯] (and only to a limited degree in Standard German, possibly under northern influence); e.g.
  - Mach das Fenster auf! ~ Machas Fenster auf! (< Low Saxon Maak dat Finster op!, cf. Standard German Öffne das Fenster!, colloquial also Mach das Fenster auf! with the imperative of the verb aufmachen) 'Open the window!'
  - Die Tür könn wir nu zumachen (< Low Saxon De Döör künnt wi nu tomaken, cf. Standard German Die Tür können wir jetzt schließen, colloquial also Die Tür können wir jetzt/nun zumachen) 'We can close the door now.'
  - Bei die aufe Tür kommp all so’n Viechzeug rein (< Low Saxon Bi de oppe Döör kümmt all so’n Krimmeltüüg rin!, cf. Standard German Bei offener Tür kommt alles mögliche Viehzeug herein, Bei offener Tür kommen alle möglichen Viecher herein) 'All kinds of critters come inside when the door is open.'
  - Bei die zue Gardine kann ich nich lesen (< Low Saxon Bi de toe Gardien kann ik nich lesen, cf. Standard German Wenn die Gardine zugezogen ist, kann ich nicht lesen) 'I can't read when the curtain is pulled shut.'

== See also ==
- Berlinerisch
- Hamburgisch
- Kiezdeutsch
- Portuñol
- Creole language
- Language contact
