= Arroio do Padre =

Municipality of Rio Grande do Sul, Brazil

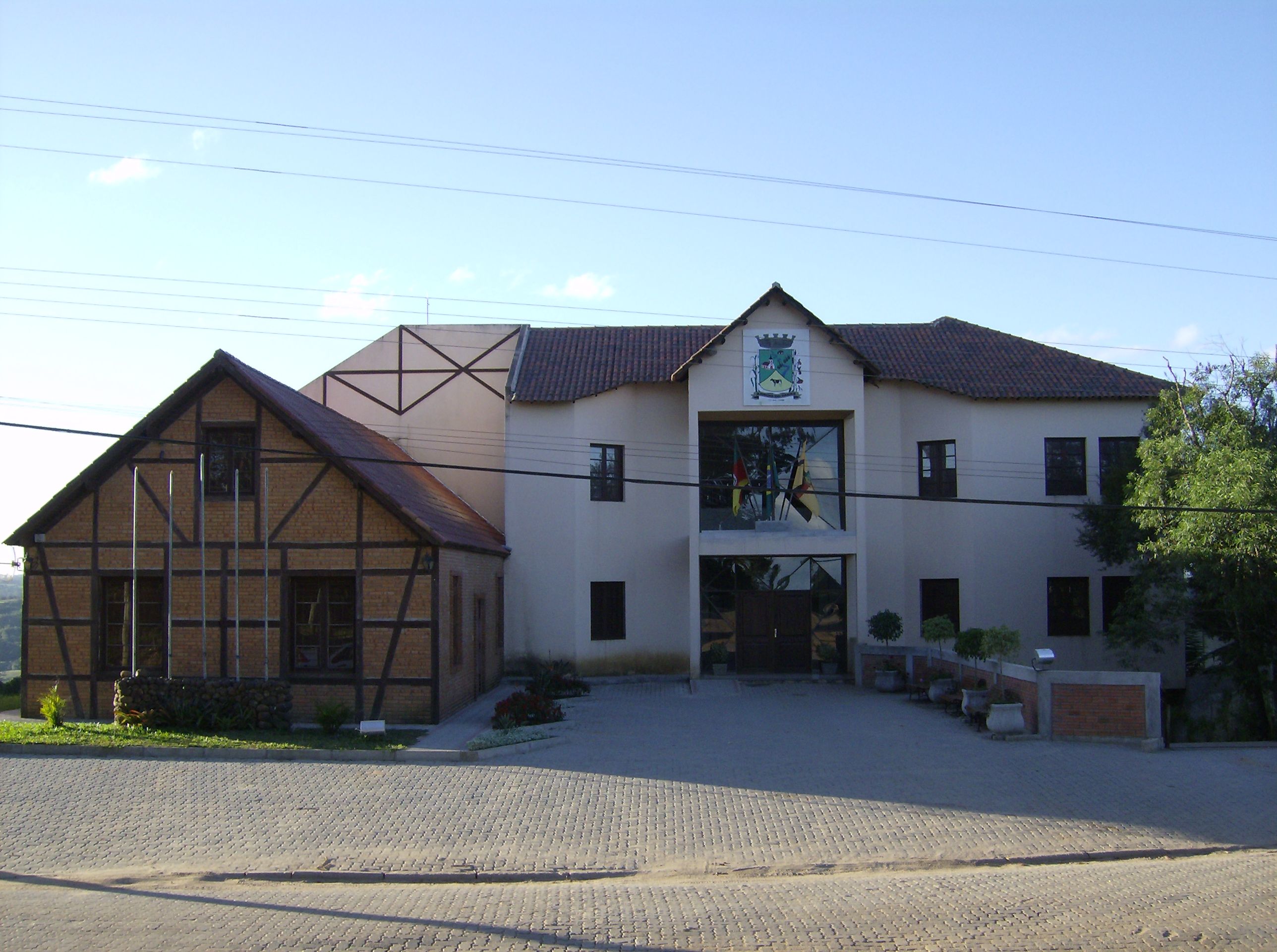

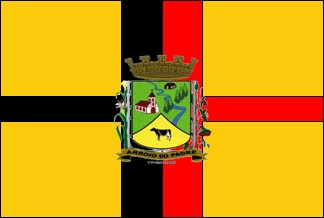
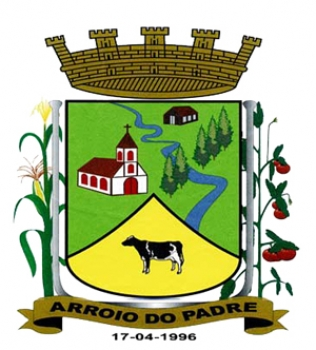
- Flag Coat of arms

- Location in Rio Grande do Sul, Brazil

- Location in Brazil
- Coordinates: 31°26′34″S 52°25′19″W
- Country: Brazil
- Region: South
- State: Rio Grande do Sul
- Founded: 1996
- 1996 (city)

Government
  - Mayor: Jaime Starke (PP)

Area
  - Total: 124.321 km^{2} (48.001 sq mi)
- Elevation: 290 m (950 ft)

Population (2020)
  - Total: 2,951
  - Density: 22.03/km^{2} (57.1/sq mi)
- Time zone: UTC−3 (BRT)
- Website: Prefeitura de Arroio do Padre

Arroio do Padre (Portuguese pronunciation: [aˈʁoju du ˈpadɾi], Portuguese meaning Priest's Stream) is a Brazilian municipality in the southeastern part of the state of Rio Grande do Sul. Its 2020 population was 2,951.

Much of the population have Pomeranian origin and are Evangelical Lutheran.

== Mayors ==
List of Arroio do Padre mayors
Nº	Name	Party	Election	Start	End	Ref
1	Almiro Buss	PDT	2000	January 1, 2001	January 1, 2005	
2	Gilnei Fischer	PFL	2004	January 1, 2005	January 1, 2009	
3	Jaime Starke	PP	2008	January 1, 2009	January 1, 2013	
4	Leonir Baschi	DEM	2012	January 1, 2013	January 1, 2017	
4	Leonir Baschi	DEM	2016	January 1, 2017	January 1, 2021	
5	Rui Carlos Peter	DEM	2020	January 1, 2021	Incumbent	

== See also ==
- List of municipalities in Rio Grande do Sul
