= Pomeranian Germans =

Germanic people native to the historic region of Pomerania

Pomeranians
Pommern
- The flag of Western Pomerania

Regions with significant populations
- Germany (Mecklenburg-Vorpommern)

Languages
- East Low German

Religion
- Protestantism (Lutheranism), Catholic Church

Related ethnic groups
- Other Germans

The Pomeranians (German: Pommern, Brazilian Portuguese: Pomeranos) are a German people native to the historical region of Pomerania. In modern times, its population inhabits Germany, including the state of Mecklenburg-Vorpommern. Nowadays there are about 12 million descendants of Germans in Brazil, a part of these Brazilians are of Pomeranian origin. Pomeranians are recognized as a traditional people of Brazil.

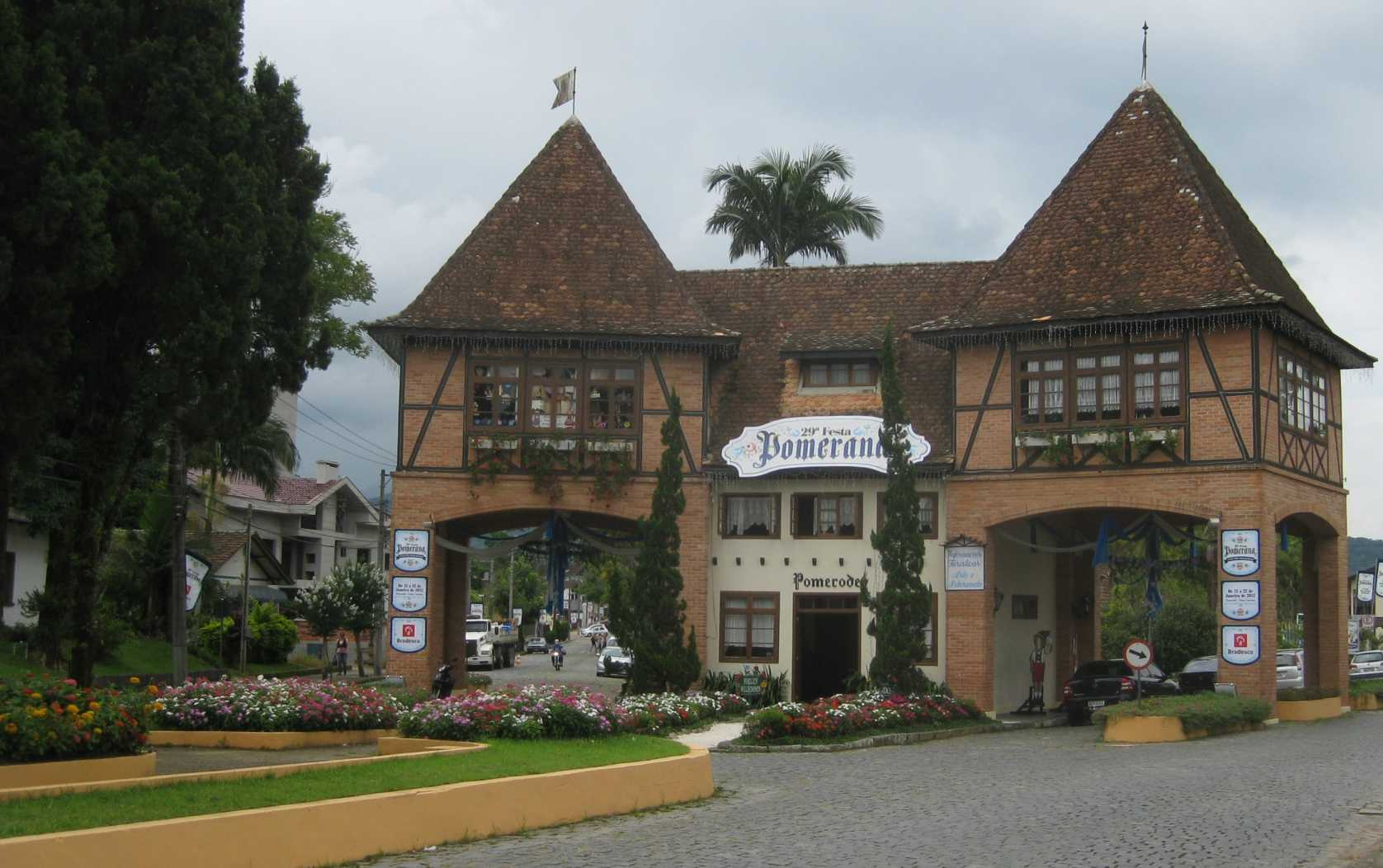
South gate in Pomerode, a Brazilian city founded by Pomeranians

== History ==
Since the Roman Era, Germanic people have inhabited the region. This includes the Iron Age Wielbark culture as well as later Migration-Era Goths, who Wielbark culture was ancestral to. In the High Middle Ages, groups of people migrated to Pomerania during the Ostsiedlung. These migrants, consisting of Germans from what is now Northwestern Germany, Danes, Dutch and Flemings, gradually outnumbered and assimilated the West Slavic tribes of the Rani, Liutizians and Slavic Pomeranians. The evolving society (German: Neustamm) was speaking the East Pomeranian, Central Pomeranian and Mecklenburgisch-Vorpommersch dialects of Low German. Mostly German immigration continued until the 20th century. The Thirty Years' War caused a severe population drop: only one-third of the pre-war Pomeranian population survived. In the late 19th and early 20th century, many Pomeranians emigrated to prospering West German industrial centers or overseas during the Ostflucht. Low German was gradually replaced by Standard German, though spoken with an accent. After World War II, most of the former Province of Pomerania became Polish, and nearly all Pomeranians living east of the Oder-Neisse line fled or were expelled to post-war Germany. Therefore, Pomeranians today live not only in Western Pomerania but are dispersed all over Germany and other countries.
