= Marchian =

Northern Low German dialect of Germany

- Brandenburgian, Brandenburgish; German: Brandenburgisch, Märkisch-Brandenburgisch
- Native to: Germany
- Region: Brandenburg, Saxony-Anhalt
- Language family: Indo-European: Germanic; West Germanic; Ingvaeonic; Low German; East Low German; Marchian

Language codes
- ISO 639-3: –
- Glottolog: bran1235
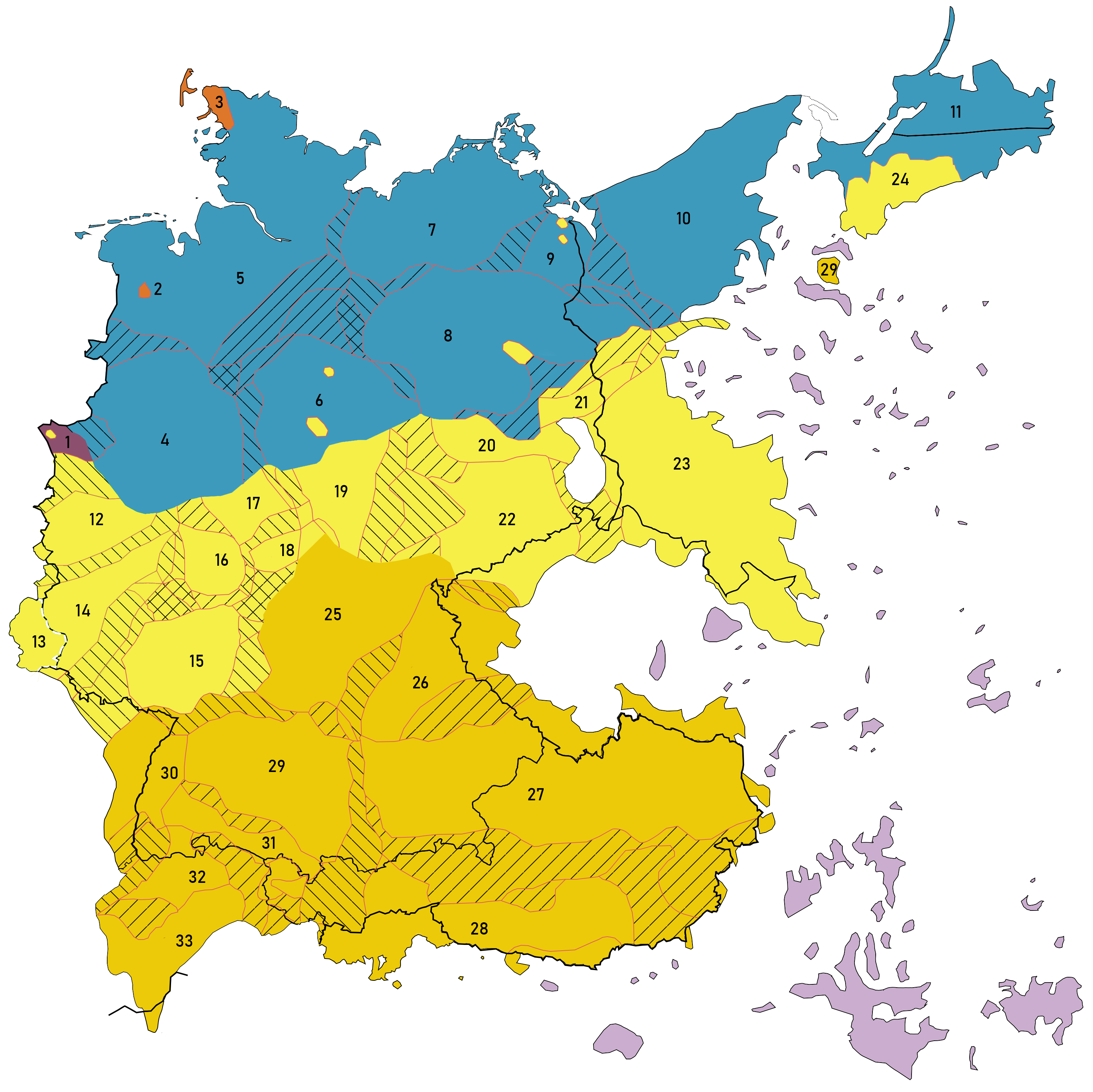
- Germanic Dialects in 1900 in Germany as of today's borders (8): Marchian (Brandenburgish)

The Marchian dialects (named after the March of Brandenburg; also called Brandenburgian or Brandenburgish; German: Brandenburgisch) are dialects of Low German, more precisely East Low German, spoken in Germany in the northern and western parts of Brandenburg (Uckermark, Prignitz and Mittelmark regions) as well as in northern Saxony-Anhalt (Altmark). The language area can be further divided into North-Markish (Stendal, Wittenberge, Prenzlau) and Middle-Markish (Brandenburg an der Havel).

The modern South-Markish (also called South Brandenburgian) dialects of southern Brandenburg and Berlin, however, are not Low German but Central German dialects. With the development of the Berlin metropolitan area, the original Low German Brandenburgish of Berlin developed into Berlinerisch, the local High German dialects, which today are considered an East Central German subgroup. The spread of High German into the Brandenburgish language area is an ongoing process.
