= Little Erna =

Little Erna (German: Klein Erna) is the butt of Little Erna jokes popular in Hamburg. This fictional character derives from a real person, Erna Nissen. Typical jokes, usually narrated in heavy Missingsch dialect, tell of ineptness, bad luck, naivety, and low culture.

== Origins ==
Erna Nissen lived in early 20th century. When she was a little girl, she was to christen a ship to be named Little Erna, when the champagne bottle didn't break. When her family moved to Hamburg, her brothers started telling this anecdote, as well as other jokes of this type.

Writer Vera Möller (1911-1998) collected many Little Erna jokes. In her narration, Little Erna is Erna Pumeier, together with her family, especially baby sister "Little Bubi" (Klein Bubi).

== Examples ==
- Mamma aus'n Fenster: „Klein Erna, muscha die Katze nich immer an Schwanz ziehn!“ Klein Erna: „Tu ich scha auch gaa nich. Die Katze zieht immer, ich halt ihr bloß fest!“ (Mum callin' down from the window: "Li'l Erna, stop pullin' the cat's tail, will ya?!" Li’l Erna: “But it ain't me doin' it! The cat keeps pullin'. I'm jus' holdin' 'er.")
- Mamma: „Klein Erna, komm ra-auf, Füße waschen, Mamma braucht die Kumme gleich zu Sala-at!“ (Mum: "Li'l Erna, come on upstai-airs! Time to wash yer fee-eet! Mum needs the bowl for saaalad!")
- Klein Erna geht mit ihr'n Heini in Dunkeln spazieren. Und wie sie inne Gegend von Bismarckdenkmal sind und 'n büschen rumknutschen, sagt Klein Erna mit'n mal: „Heini, wis ma sehn, wo ich an Blinddaam opariert bin?“ „O ja, Klein Erna, zeig mal her!“ „Kuck mal, da unten, wo die vielen Lichter brennen, da is das Hafenkrankenhaus. Da bin ich an Blinddaam opariert!“ (Li'l Erna's walkin' with 'er Ricky in the dark. An' as they're by the Bismarck Memorial an' are doin' a bit o' knoodlin', says Erna, “Say, Ricky, d'ya wanna see where I had my appendix out?" "Oh, yes, Li'l Erna. Come on! Show me!" "Look, down there, where all the lights are, that's where the Harbour Hospital is. That's where I had my appendix out.")

== In literature and arts ==
- Klein Erna – Ganz dumme Hamburger Geschichten, Retold and illustrated by Vera Möller, Hans Christians Verlag, Hamburg 1950,
  - 2011 edition:Ellert & Richter Verlag, Hamburg 2011, ISBN 978-3-8319-0447-1
- 1969 film Klein Erna auf dem Jungfernstieg. (Little Erna at IMDb)

== See also ==
- Dumb blonde
