= Demographic history of Pomerania =

Mother Tongues of the Province of Pomerania, according to the 1905 Census

Pomerania has experienced several transitions not only of culture and administration, but also of its population.

In 997 AD many Old Prussians were baptized by Adalbert of Prague in the Vistula Delta. By that time Slavs had moved up north and the territory became known as Pomerania by 1046 AD.

The second major transition of most of the Pomeranian tribes was from Slavic to German in the 14th century. At the end of the first millennium, Piast Poland incorporated whole of Pomerania into its state. Afterwards, in the beginning of the second millennium, Denmark and the German Holy Roman Empire started to incorporate pagan Pomeranian territories into their expanding feudal states. Most Slavic Pomeranian tribes west of the Oder had lost their independence in late 12th century. In the course of the 14th and 15th century, German settlement in the Duchy of Pomerania increased. Where Slavic population was left, they were called Wends, Kashubians or Slovincians to distinguish them from the German Pomeranians. Whereas through later history the Kashubs were only minority in the Eastern Duchy of Pomerania, their numbers were notably higher in Pomerelia as well as the numbers of Germans were significantly lower there either. Pomeranian history was, from that time, closely tied to the history of Germany, Denmark and Sweden, whereas Pomerelian history was also until 1308 and between 1466 and 1772 closely tied to Poland.

In the 17th and 18th centuries, the Thirty Years' War and the Nordic Wars had a severe impact on all of Germany including the Pomeranian population. More than half died and many villages were wiped out. After this enormous population drop, new settlers were called in from less devastated German territories. Yet, not all villages were repopulated, so today's density of communities is not as high as back in the Middle Ages.

The third major change of Pomeranian population happened in the course of World War II and its aftermath. In Nazi Germany, Jews and many members of the Polish minority were murdered. Due to the advance of the Red Army and the territorial changes after the war, nearly all Germans populating post-war Poland that survived the war and failed to evacuate in 1945 were expelled to post-war Germany 1945-1947. The major, now Polish part of Pomerania was resettled mostly with Poles, in part expellees from the former eastern territories of Poland annexed by the Soviet Union.
