= Mecklenburgisch-Vorpommersch dialect =

Low German dialect

Mecklenburgisch-Vorpommersch
- Native to: Germany
- Region: Mecklenburg-Vorpommern
- Ethnicity: Pomeranians
- Language family: Indo-European: Germanic; West Germanic; North Sea Germanic; Low German; East Low German; Mecklenburgisch-Vorpommersch

Language codes
- ISO 639-2: nds for Low German
- ISO 639-3: nds for Low German
- Glottolog: meck1238
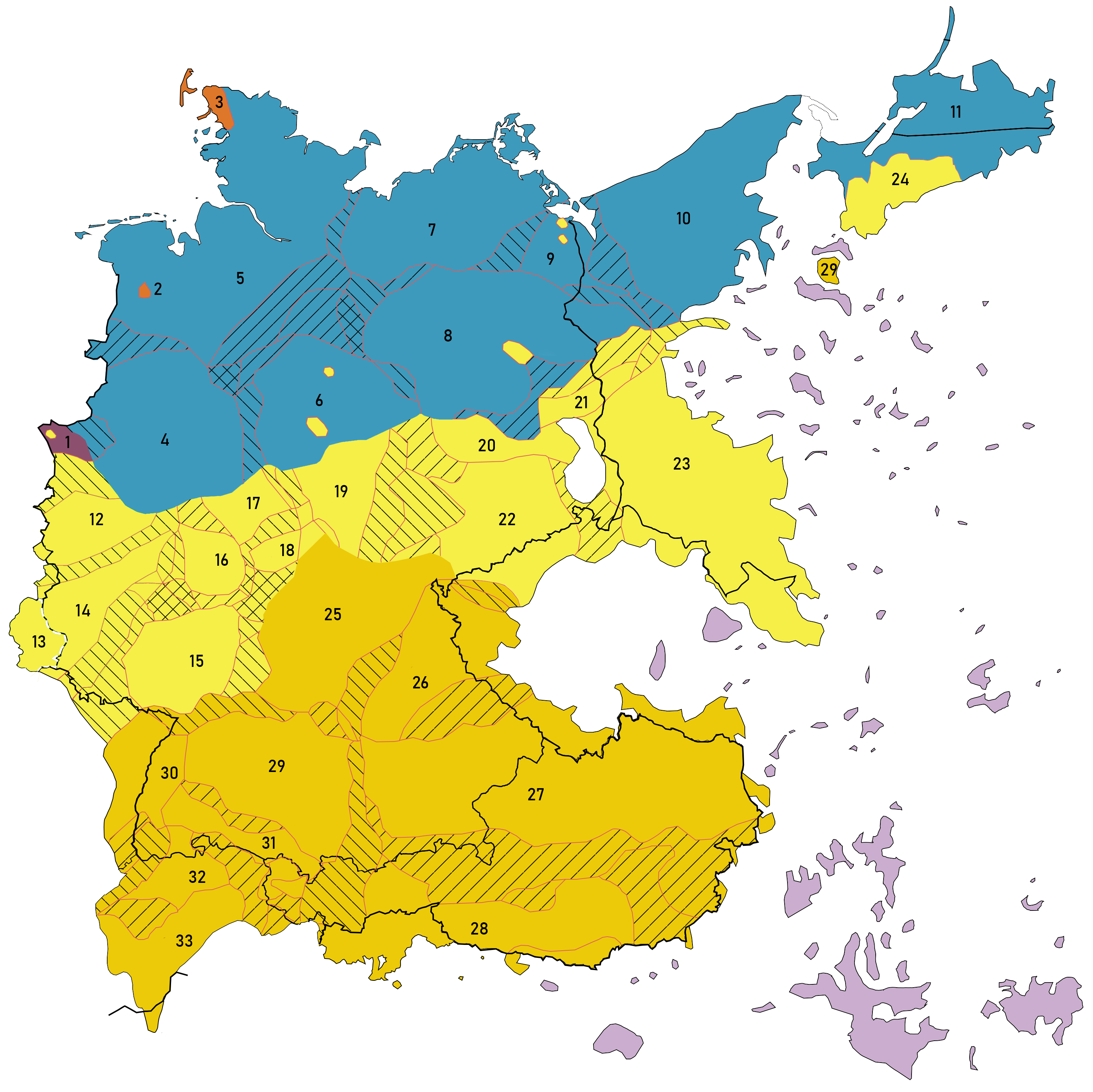
- Germanic Dialects in 1900 in Germany as of today's borders (7): Mecklenburgisch-Vorpommersch

Mecklenburgisch-Vorpommersch is a Low German dialect spoken in the German state of Mecklenburg-Vorpommern. It belongs to the East Low German group.

In the western parts of the language area it is similar to some West Low German dialects, while the eastern parts are influenced by the Central Pomeranian (Mittelpommersch) dialect. It differs slightly from East Pomeranian, which used to be spoken widely in the area that in 1945 became the Polish part of Farther Pomerania and included much more Slavic Pomeranian and Kashubian elements.

== Geography ==
- In former Mecklenburg-Schwerin: Schwerin-Rostock-Wismar-Güstrow
- In Western Pomerania: Stralsund-Greifswald-Anklam
- In former Mecklenburg-Strelitz: Neustrelitz-Neubrandenburg

== Grammar ==
=== Diminutive ===
A striking characteristic of Mecklenburgisch-Vorpommersch is the use of the diminutive suffix -ing (e.g. Poot ‘paw’ > Pöting ‘little paw’, Änning ‘Annie’, lies’ ‘quietly’, ‘softly’, ‘slowly’ > liesing ‘very quietly’, ‘very softly’, ‘very carefully’, ‘nice and easy’). This suffix first appears in modern Low German variations (early 19th century onwards), and is of Germanic origin, being attested in several other Germanic-speaking areas, such as Westphalian family names Arning, Smeding and Janning.

=== Pronouns ===
The personal pronouns in the dialect of Fritz Reuter are as follow:

		1st person	2nd person	3rd person		
		1st person	2nd person	Masculine	Feminine	Neuter
Singular	Nominative	ick	du	hei	sei	dat ('t)
Singular	Accusative	mi	di	em	ehr	dat
Plural	Nominative	wi	ji	sei		
Plural	Accusative	uns	jug (ju)	sei		

The reflexive pronoun of the 3rd person is sick, and the possessive pronouns (which are declined like strong adjectives) are:

	1st person	2nd person	3rd person		
	1st person	2nd person	Masculine	Feminine	Neuter
Singular	min	din	sin	ehr	sin
Plural	uns'	jug	ehr		

=== Numbers ===
Numbers in the dialect of Fritz Reuter are:

Cardinal numbers	Ordinal numbers
1: ein (en); 2: twei; 3: drei; 4: vir; 5: fiw; 6: sös; 7: säben; 8: acht; 9: negen; 10: teigen (teihn); 11: elben; 12: twölf; 13: drütteigen; 14: virteigen; 15: föfteigen; 16: sösteigen; 17: säbenteigen; 18: achtteigen; 19: negenteigen; 20: twintig; 21: einuntwintig; 30: dörtig; 40: virtig; 50: föftig; 60: söstig; 70: säbentig; 80: achttig; 90: negentig; 100: hunnert; 1000: dusend; 10 000: teigen dusend; 1 000 000: 'ne million	1.: de irst; 2.: de tweit; 3.: de drüdd; 4.: de virt; 5.: de föft; 6.: de söst; 7.: de säbent; 8.: de acht; 9.: de negent; 10.: de teigt; 11.: de elbent; 12.: de twölft; 13.: de drütteigt; ...; 20.: de twintigst; 21.: de einuntwintigst; 30.: de dörtigst; 40.: de virtigst; 50.: de föftigst; 60.: de söstigst; 70.: de säbentigst; 80.: de achtigst; 90.: de negentigst; 100.: de hunnertst; 1000.: de dusendst; 10 000.: de teigendusendst

=== Verbs ===
Uncomposed forms in the dialect of Fritz Reuter:

Infinitive
halen
Present Active
[ick] hal(e)	[du] hal(e)st	[hei] hal(t)	[wi] hal(e)n	[ji] hal(e)t	[sei] hal(e)n
Imperfect Active
[ick] halt(e)	[du] halt(e)st	[hei] halt(e)	[wi] halt(e)n	[ji] halt(e)t	[sei] halt(e)n
Imperative
hal(e)			hal(e)t		
Past Participle
hal(e)t

- The e in parentheses often gets dropped.
