= Heinrich Bandlow =

German writer (1855–1933)

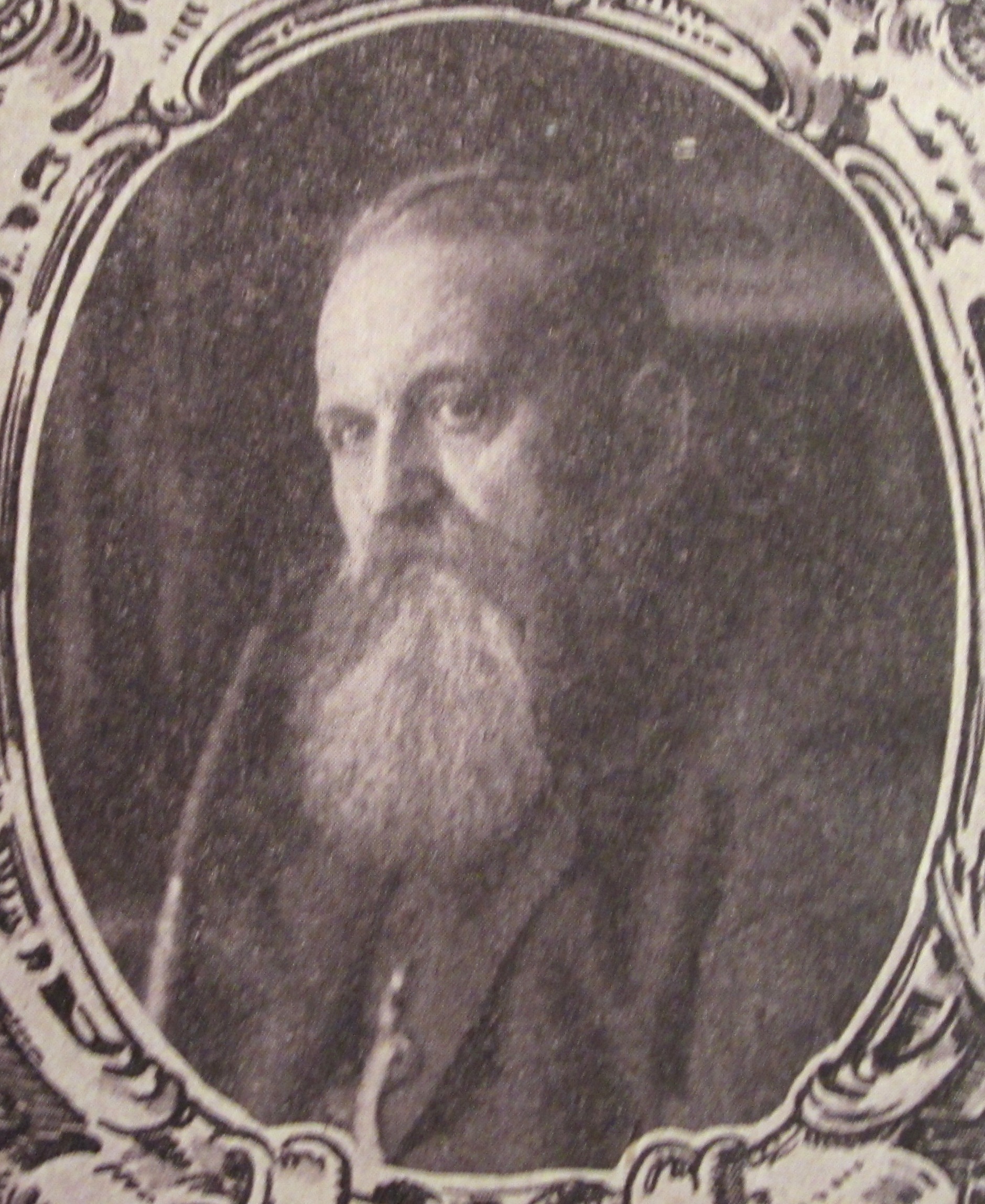
Heinrich Bandlow

Heinrich Bandlow (14 April 1855 in Tribsees – 25 August 1933 in Greifswald) was a Pomeranian author, writing in Standard as well as in Low German. For his Low German works he is known as "Pomeranian Reuter", which is a reference to his Mecklenburgian counterpart, Fritz Reuter.

== Life ==
Heinrich Bandlow was born on 14 April 1855 in Tribsees. From 1872 to 1875, he was a student at the Franzburg college, where he became a teacher. From 1875 to 1877 he taught at the Richtenberg school before he returned to Tribsees, where he worked at the local school from 1877 until 1907. After a two years special education in Berlin, he moved to Greifswald with his family where he worked as an art teacher until he retired in 1916. Bandlow married his wife in 1879, and with her he had six children. Tribsees made Bandlow a "citizen of honor".

== Bandlow as an author ==
Bandlow wrote poems, fairy tales, lyrics and fiction since he was a young man. Because of his low salaries as a teacher and his growing family, he was in constant need of money. His first publications were in paper columns. Later, 34 books of Bandlow were published.

== Selected books ==
- Naturdoktor Stremel. 1899.
- Ut de Hiringslak. Hinstorff, Wismar 1904.
- De Düwel is los! Hesse & Becker, Leipzig 1916.
- De Uhlenkraug. Nedderdütsch Bökeri, Band 19. Hermes, Hamburg 1917.
- De vigiletten Strümp. Hans Köhler, Hamburg 1928.

== Modern compilations of Bandlow's works ==
- Nich leigen ... Hinstorff Verlag, Rostock 1987, ISBN 3-356-00075-6.
- Malle Vögel aus Vorpommern. Hinstorff Verlag, Rostock 1998, ISBN 3-356-00783-1.

== Bandlow in other literature ==
- Fritz Raeck: Pommersche Literatur. Proben und Daten. Pommerscher Zentralverband, Hamburg 1969, p. 319 - in this compilation there is a poem and a short story both written by Bandlow.
