= Pomerode =

- Municipality
- Municipality of Pomerode
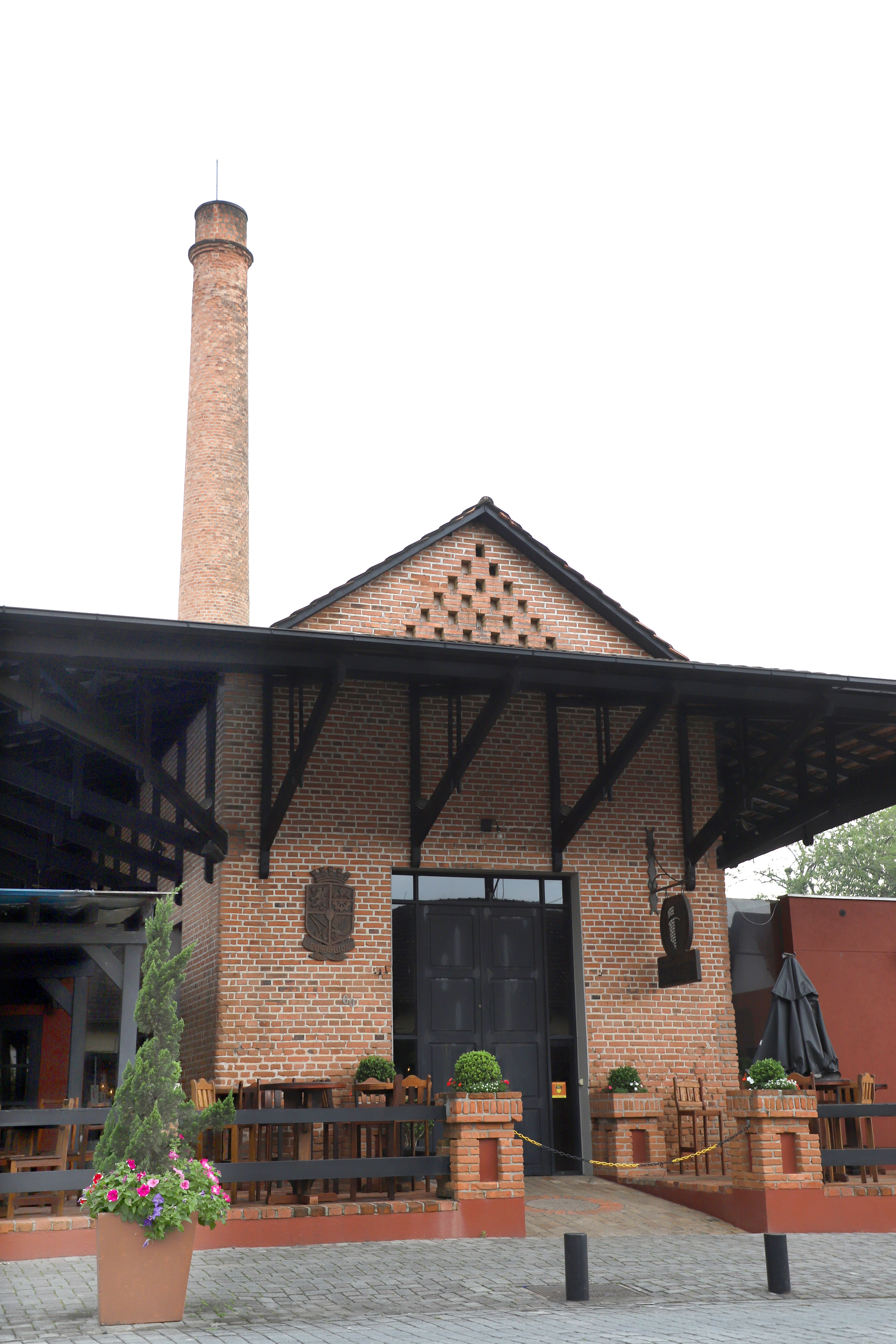
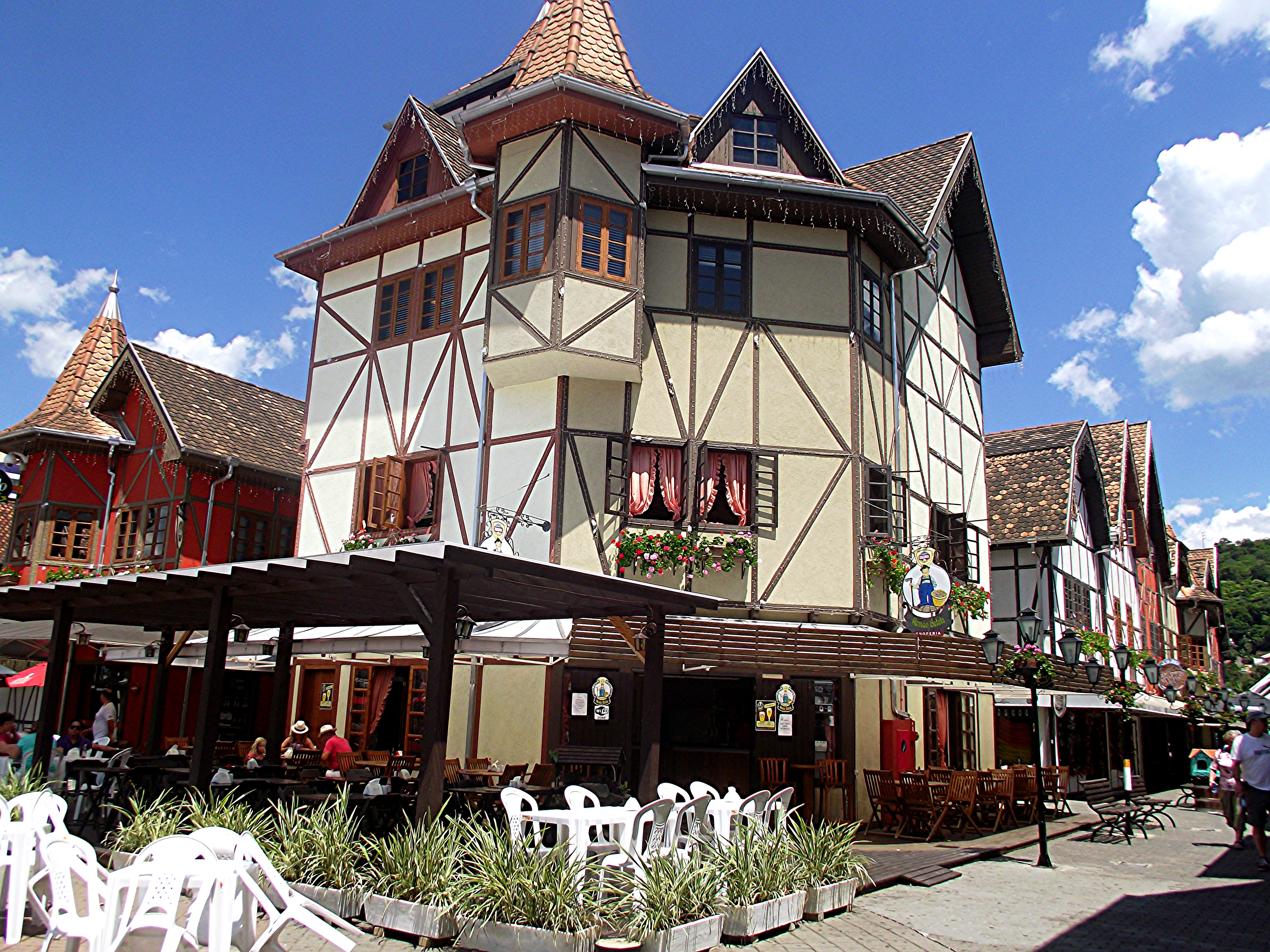
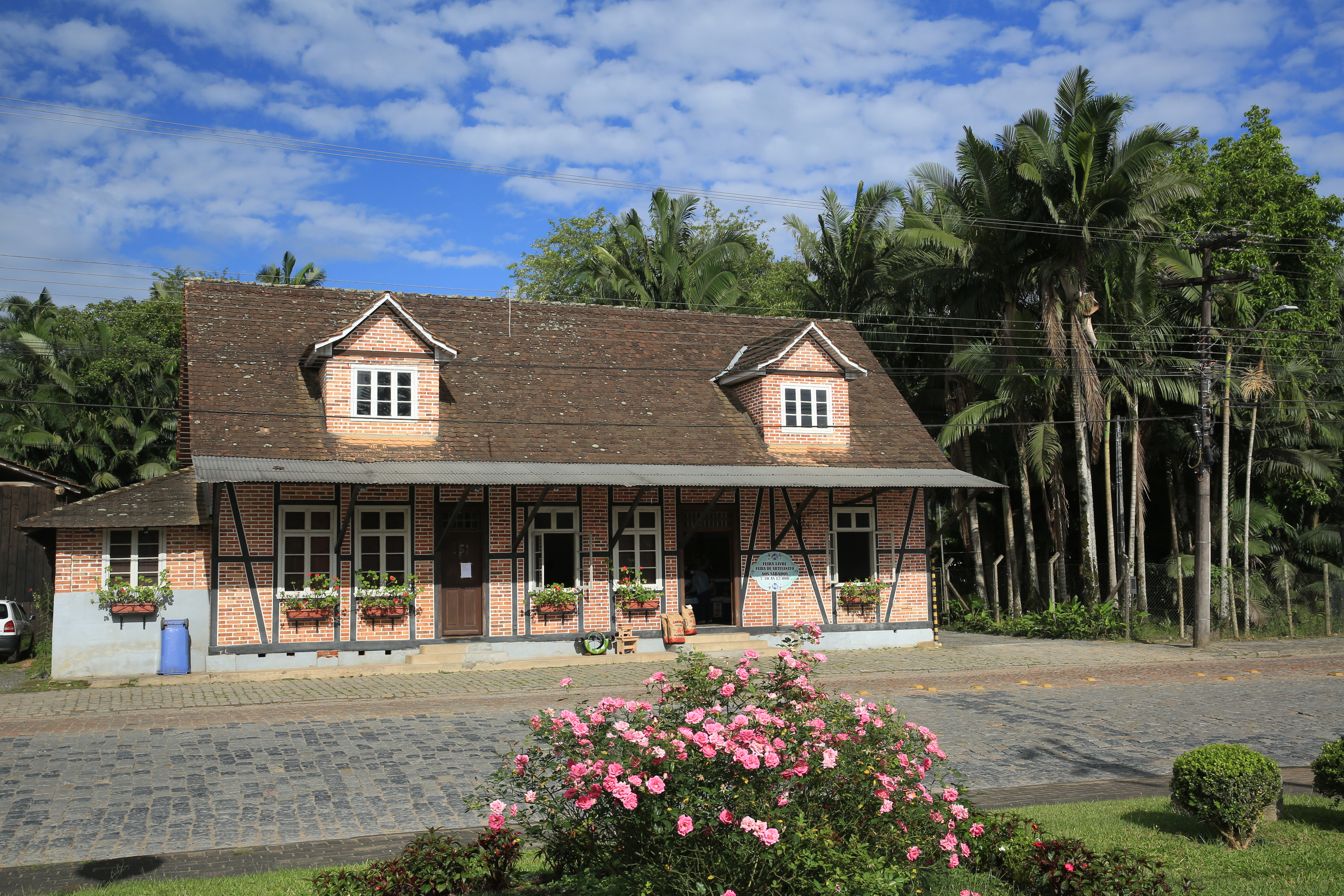
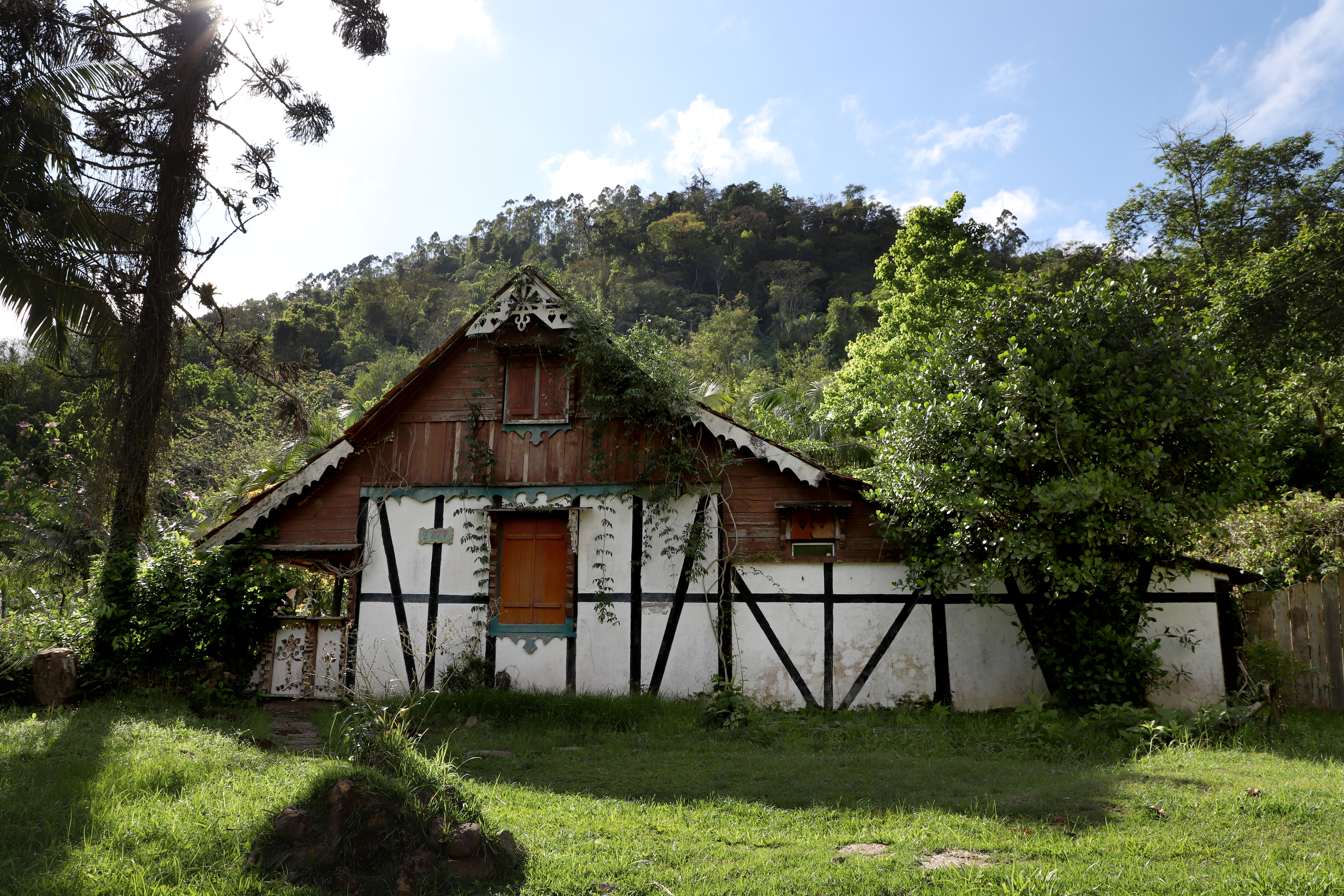
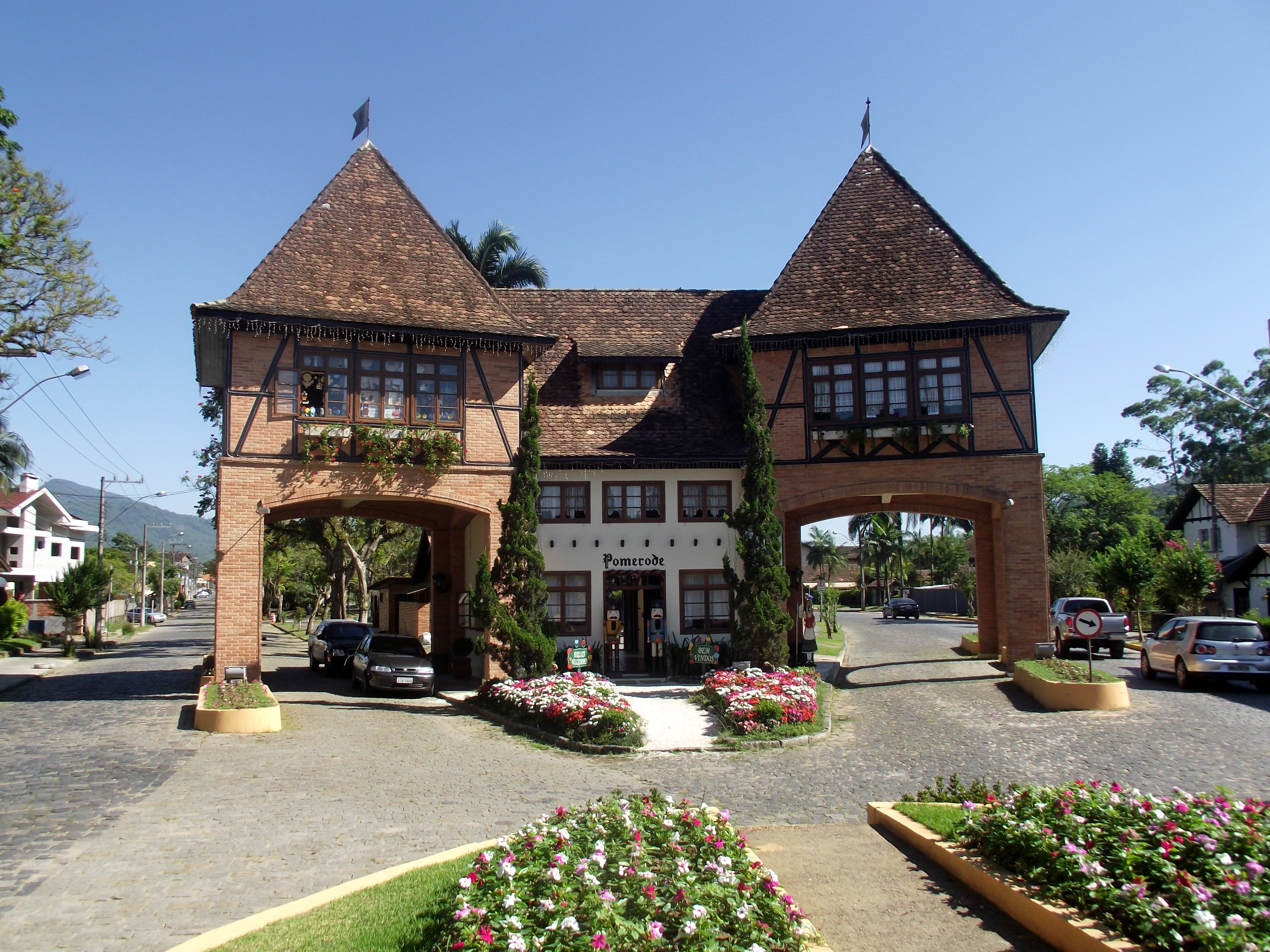
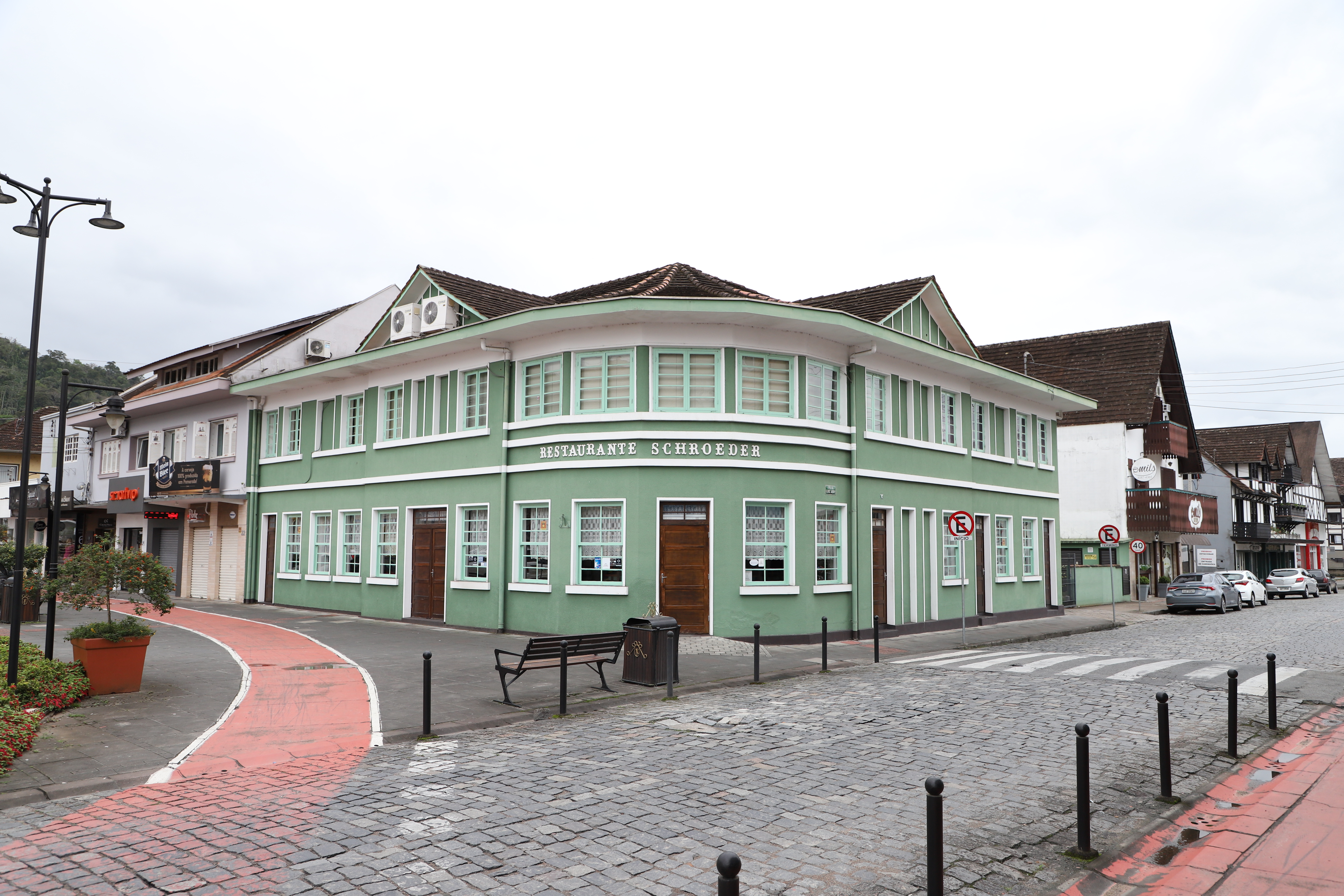

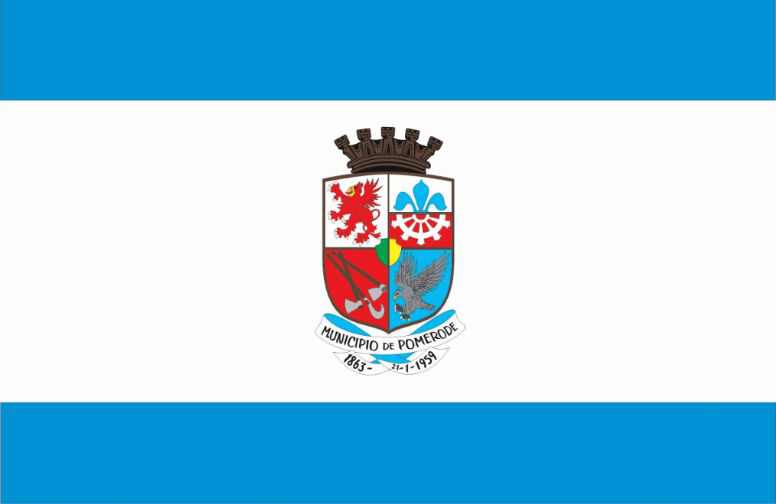
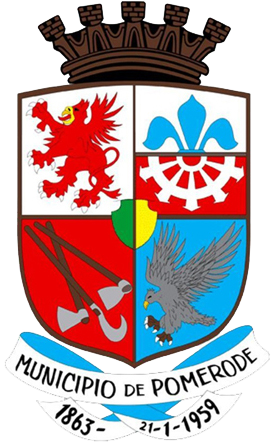
- Flag Coat of arms
- Nickname: A cidade mais alemã do Brasil (The most German city in Brazil)
- Motto: "Unser Kleines Deutschland" (German) "Nossa Pequena Alemanha" (Portuguese) (Our Little Germany)
- Location of Pomerode

- Location within Brazil
- Coordinates: 26°44′27″S 49°10′37″W
- Country: Brazil
- Region: South
- State: Santa Catarina
- Founded: January 21, 1959

Government
  - Mayor: Ercio Kriek

Area
  - Total: 215.904 km^{2} (83.361 sq mi)

Population (2020)
  - Total: 34,010
  - Density: 114/km^{2} (300/sq mi)
- Time zone: UTC-3 (UTC-3)
  - Summer (DST): UTC-2 (UTC-2)
- HDI (2010): 0.780 – high
- Website: www.pomerode.sc.gov.br

Pomerode (Portuguese: [pomeˈɾode]) is a Brazilian municipality in the state of Santa Catarina, in Southern Brazil. It is located in the valley of the Itajaí-Açu river, not very far from the city of Blumenau, one of the largest cities in the state.

Pomerode is known as the most German city in Brazil, because the vast majority of its inhabitants are of German descent and are bilingual in German and Portuguese. The East Pomeranian dialect of Low German is also used by the community.

== History and the local language ==
Pomerode was founded by Pomeranians in 1861 and is considered the "most typically German of all German towns of southern Brazil".

There is a group of people in the community who speak the East Pomeranian dialect of Low German.

== Ethnic composition ==
Race/Skin color	Percentage	Number
White	92.01%	25,542
Pardo (Multiracial)	7.19%	1,996
Black	0.61%	169
Asian	0.14%	38
Amerindian	0.05%	13

Source: IBGE 2010.

== Religion ==
Religion	Percentage	Number
Catholics	31.17%	6,896
Protestants	66.39%	14,690
No religion	0.98%	217
Kardecists	0.13%	29

Source: IBGE 2010.

Lutherans are 63.76% of the population, as German Pomerania was traditionally overwhelmingly Lutheran. Over time, some of the Pomeranians converted to Catholicism, and Catholics from the rest of Brazil moved into the town.

== Tourism and economy ==
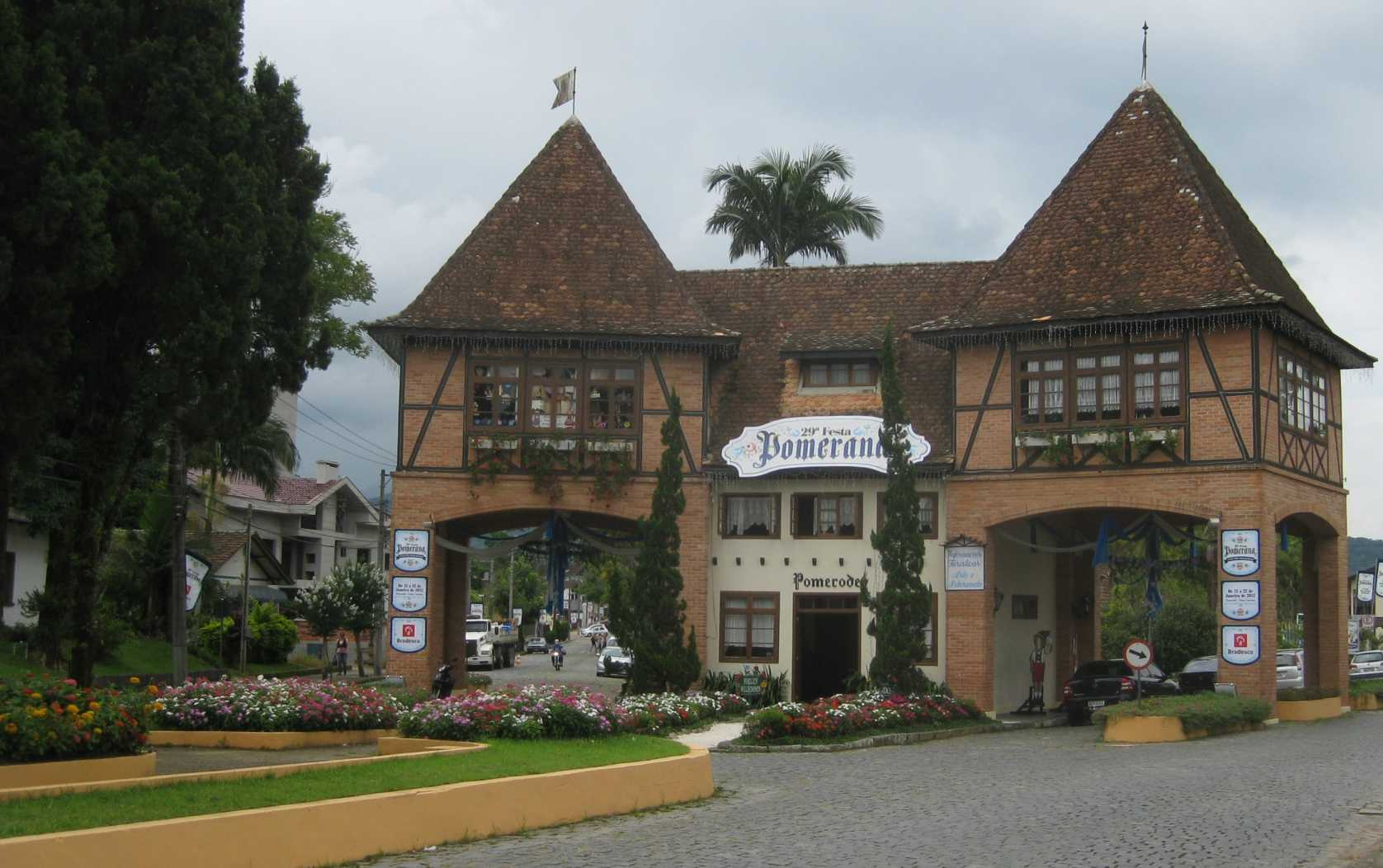
South gate in Pomerode

Pomerode has a significant manufacturing industry like other cities in the region. It is located in the midst of a very fertile agricultural valley. Additionally, in the last few decades, the creation and development of the tourist industry has become a priority for the local authorities. To accomplish that, serious efforts are being made to reinforce and celebrate the roots of the local inhabitants.

The area around Blumenau (about 30 km (19 mi) away) is known for attracting thousands of visitors annually for Oktoberfest of Blumenau, the second largest Oktoberfest in the world right after the original festival in Munich. This has increased the number of tourists in Pomerode.

In addition to tourism the economy is dependent on industry, which includes knitted clothing, plastic articles, state of the art metal and mechanical industries, garments and cloth, and furniture.

== Notable people ==
- Hans Fischer (1961 in Pomerode – 1988) a Brazilian cyclist, he competed at the 1980 and 1984 Summer Olympics
- Marlon Teixeira (born 16 September 1991 in Pomerode) a Brazilian model, he has worked with major brands such as Dolce & Gabbana, Chanel, and Emporio Armani, and has appeared on the covers of Vogue and GQ.
