= Lubiąż Abbey =

Monastery in Lower Silesian Voivodeship, Poland

- Opactwo Cysterskie w Lubiążu
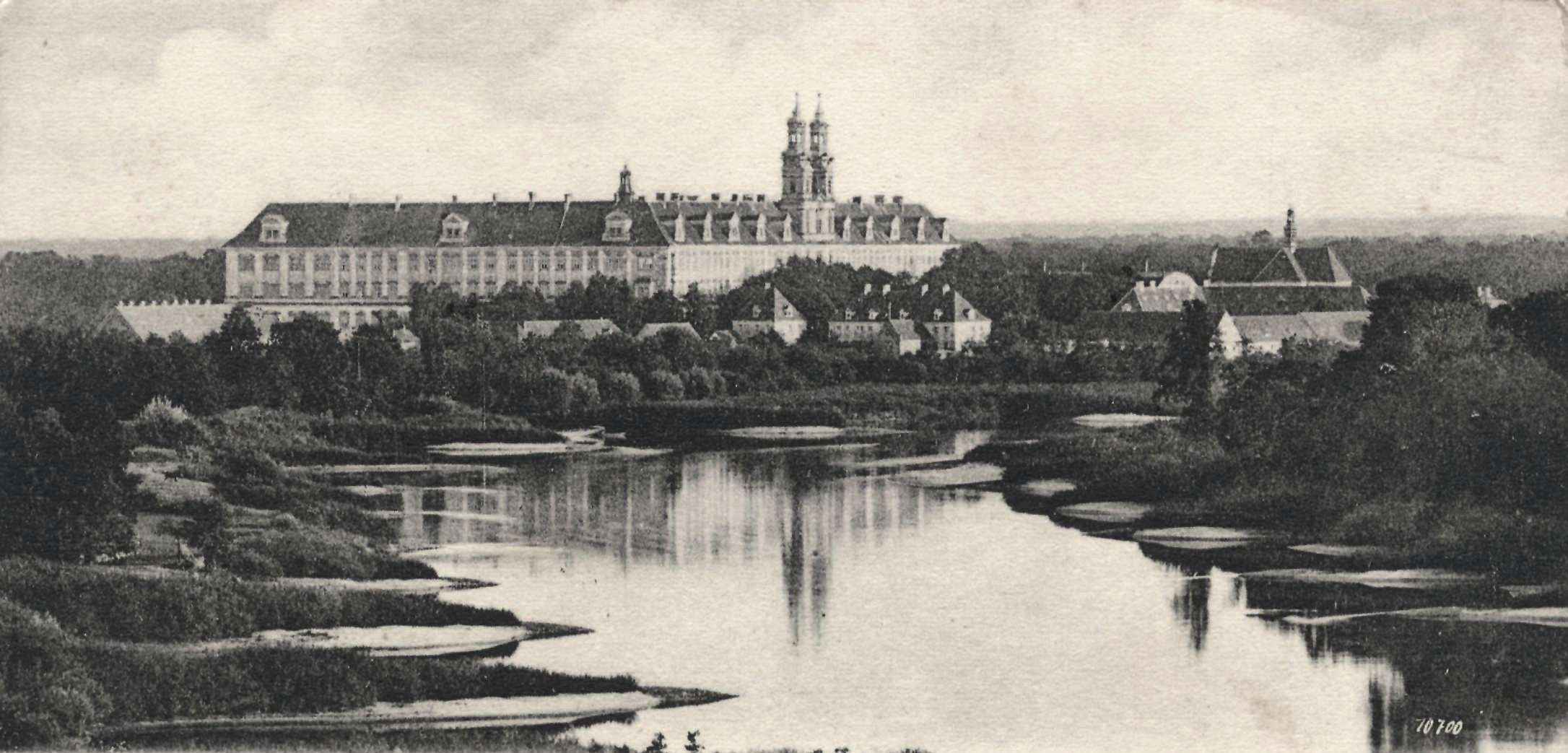
- A view of the abbey from the north in 1910
- Interactive map of Lubiąż Abbey

Monastery information
- Order: Cistercian
- Established: 1175
- Disestablished: 1810
- Mother house: Pforta Abbey
- Dedication: Assumption of Mary
- Archdiocese: Roman Catholic Archdiocese of Wrocław

People
- Founder: Bolesław I the Tall

Architecture
- Status: inactive
- Heritage designation

Historic Monument of Poland
- Designated: October 5, 1988
- Reference no.: A/2755/616/W
- Completed date: 1699

Site
- Location: Lubiąż, Poland
- Coordinates: 51°15′42″N 16°28′9″E
- Public access: yes
- Website: https://fundacjalubiaz.org.pl/

Lubiąż Abbey (Polish: Opactwo cystersów w Lubiążu; German: Kloster Leubus; Silesian: Ôpactwo Lubiōnz) is a former Cistercian monastery in Lubiąż, in the Lower Silesian Voivodeship of southwestern Poland, located about 54 km (34 mi) northwest of Wrocław. With a main facade measuring 223 metres (732 ft), Lubiąż is one of the largest abbeys ever constructed.

The monastery was founded by the Silesian Duke Bolesław I the Tall, who had the foundation charter drawn up in 1175. Monks from the Cistercian Abbey of Pforta founded the new monastery on the then-densely wooded bank of the Oder. Lubiąż developed into the most important monastery in Silesia and played a significant role in the settlement and development of Silesia. It founded six daughter houses and owned dozens of villages and manors, making the abbey wealthy and able to withstand several wars and crises. In the 17th and 18th centuries, it was rebuilt as one of the largest and most representative examples of Baroque architecture in Silesia.

It was disestablished after the First Silesian War and used by the Prussian state until the end of World War II, after which it was plundered and fell into disrepair. After the fall of communism in Poland, major restoration works began, which continue to the present.

== History ==
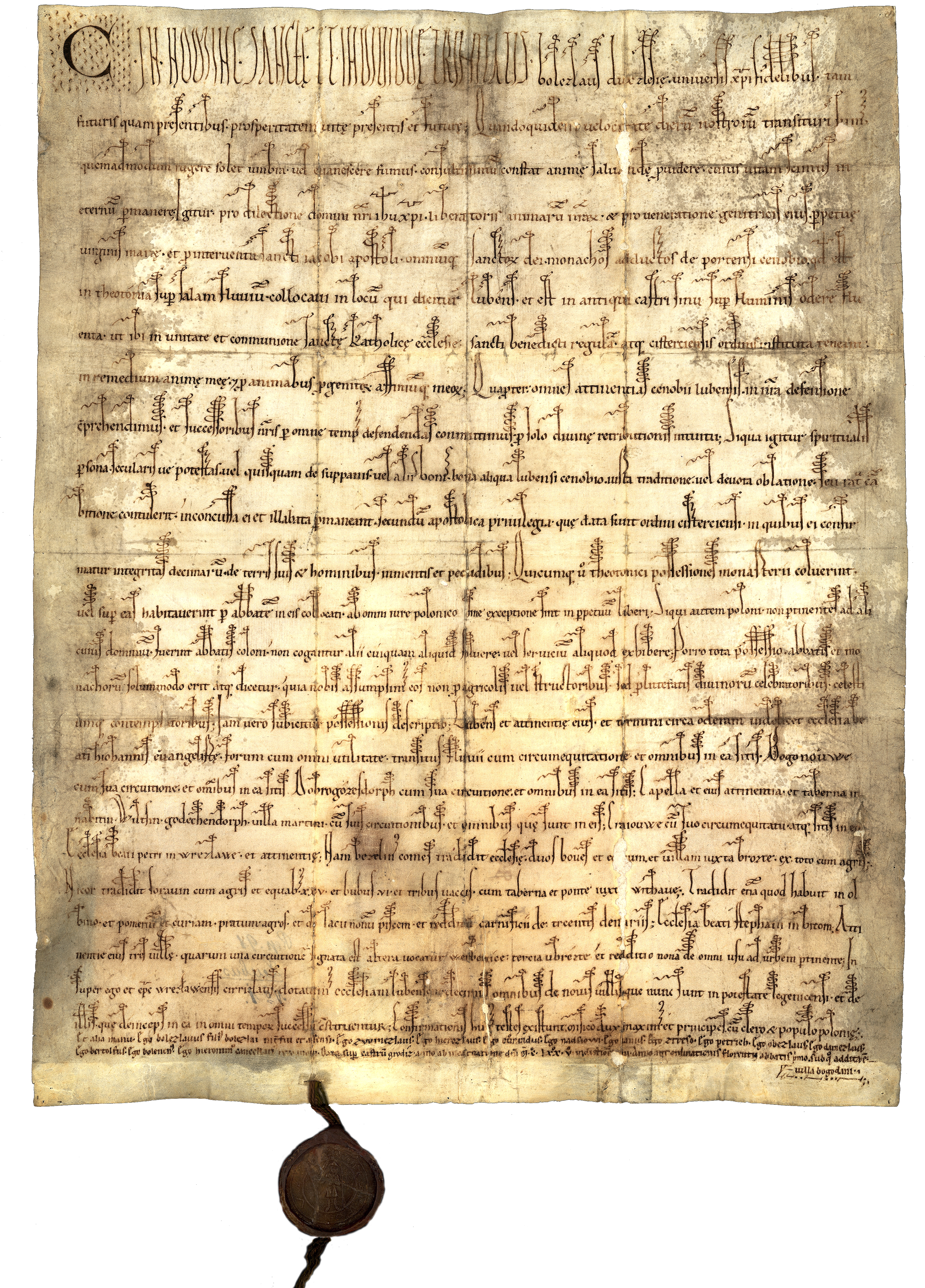
Document of Duke Bolesław I the Tall from 1175, founding the monastery

The abbey is situated near a ford across the Oder river. Originally, the area had been a fortified site of pagan worship. This complex was presumably destroyed by 1109. Later, a Benedictine monastery and church of Saint James may have been established about 1150, but, if it had ever existed, had already been abandoned before 1163. At any rate, the area was densely forested well into the 12th century. The area had been mainly inhabited by Poles, however, German settlement in the area slowly increased.

At this time the area belonged to the Duchy of Silesia, bequeathed by Duke Bolesław III Wrymouth of Poland to his eldest son Władysław II in 1138. In a fratricidal conflict of the Polish Piast dynasty, Władysław was expelled by his younger brother and fled to Altenburg in the Holy Roman Empire. With the aid by Emperor Frederick Barbarossa, however, his sons were restored to their Silesian heritage in 1163.

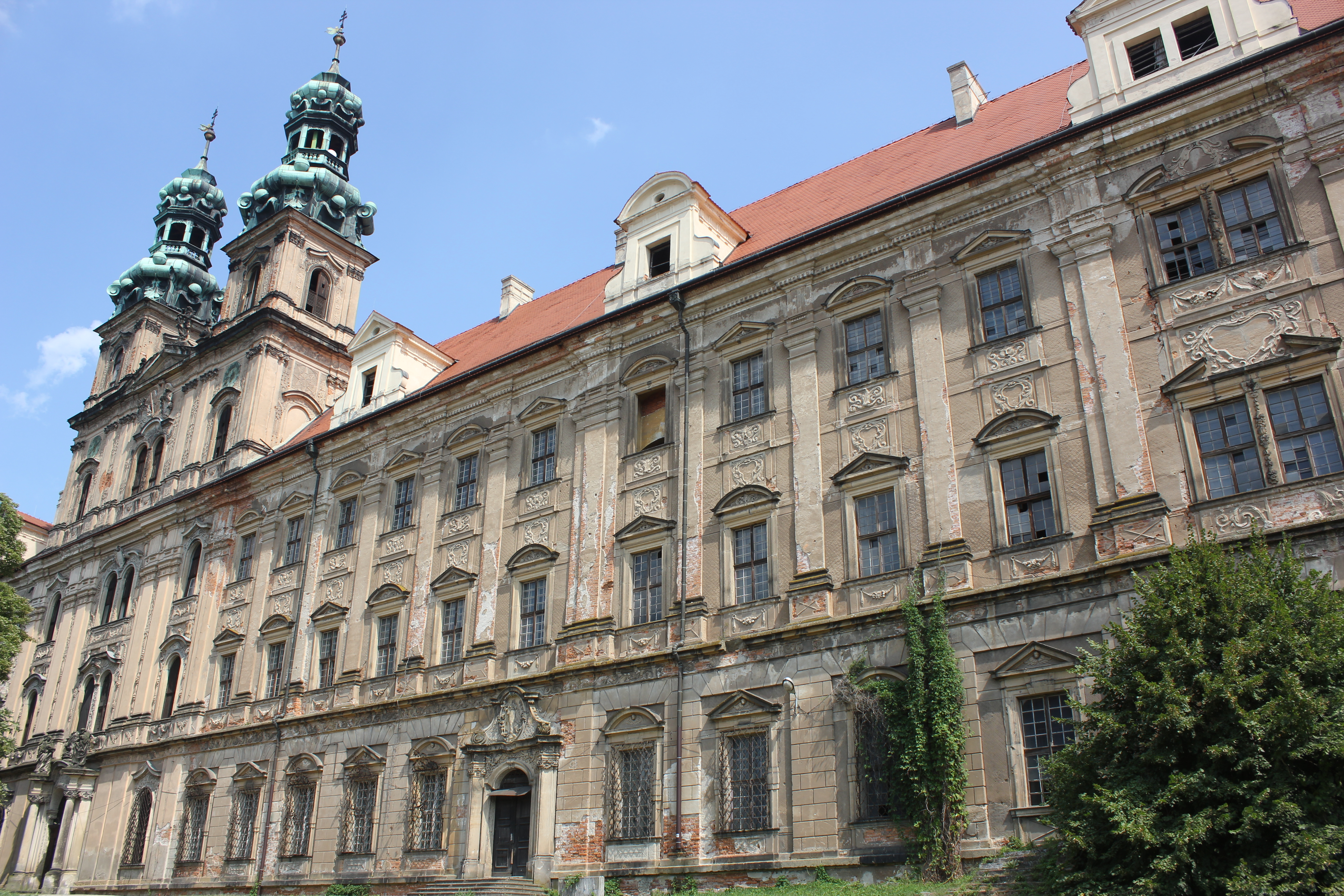
The main facade of the abbey in 2018

Władysław's eldest son, Duke Bolesław I the Tall, had spent several years in German exile. When he assumed the rule of Lower Silesia, he invited Cistercian monks from Pforta Abbey on the Saale River (in present-day Thuringia) and settled them in Lubiąż as the first of their order in Silesia. Due to lack of funding and political turmoil, construction, which started in 1163, dragged on for years. The first monastery complex was finally completed 1175, when Duke Bolesław I issued the official foundation charter at Grodziec Castle. Through drainage works the monks reclaimed land in the swampy environs of the monastery, implemented three-field crop rotation and laid out vineyards. Their efforts were successful and marked the beginning of the medieval German Ostsiedlung to Silesia. Lubiąż was, at the time of its foundation, the furthest east point of German settlement in Slavic lands.

From its foundation to the cession of Silesia to Poland in 1945, Lubiąż Abbey was widely known by its German name, Kloster Leubus. Its Latin name was Abbatia Lubensis. It was dedicated to the Assumption of Mary.

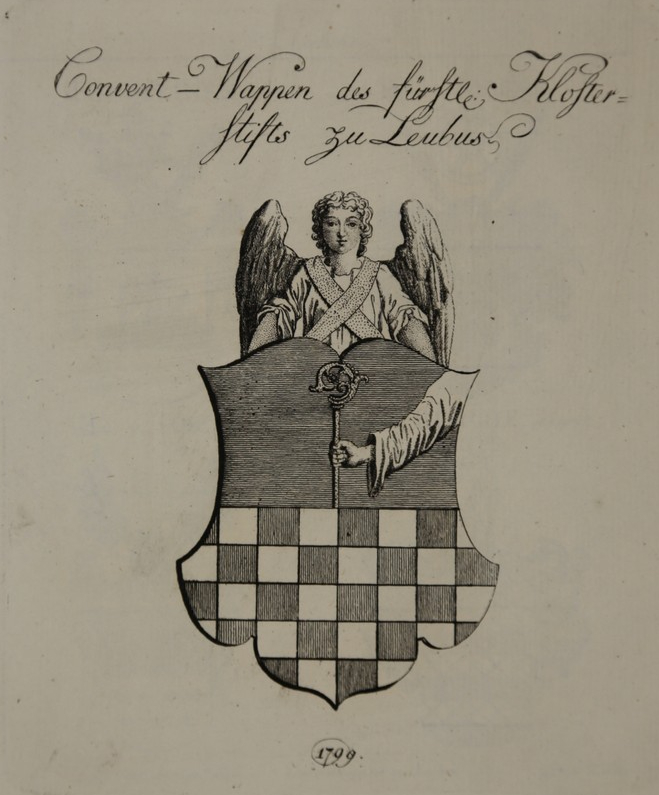
The abbey's arms

About 1200 the abbey church was rebuilt, at that time the first Brick Gothic building in the region. When Duke Bolesław I died in 1201, he was buried under the high altar. The rise of Lubiąż continued under the rule of his son Duke Henry I the Bearded and his consort Hedwig of Andechs. Henry's reign brought a considerable increase in power in Silesia, including through the acquisition of the Duchy of Krakow in 1232, which made him Senior Duke of Poland. His rule ushered in a heyday of the monastery. In 1202 the monastery already owned 27 villages and towns, some of which it had built itself and some of which had been donated to it.

=== Establishment of daughter monasteries ===
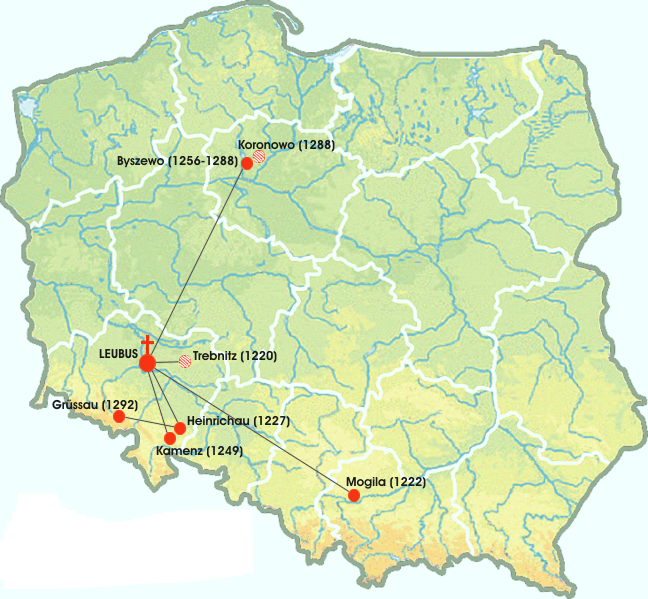
The daughter houses of Lubiąż on a map of modern Poland

The 13th century also brought with it an expansion of the reformist Cistercians originating from Lubiąż, which manifested itself in the takeover and re-establishment of monasteries in different parts of Poland. In 1220, Pope Honorius III handed over the Cistercian Trzebnica Abbey, which was founded by Hedwig, to Lubiąż for supervision. Soon afterwards, the Bishop of Kraków Iwo Odrowąż summoned some Cistercians from Lubiąż to Lesser Poland in 1222, gave them the village of Mogiła and donated the local monastery church as the nucleus for a new monastery. Mogiła—which, according to the founding myth, was founded over the grave of Wanda, the daughter of the legendary founder of Kraków, Krak—became Lubiąż's first daughter monastery. Silesian dukes Henry the Bearded and later his son Henry II the Pious were urged by the Bishop of Kraków to use the economically and culturally successful monastery for the further development of the country. In 1227, the Piasts founded Henryków Abbey, named after the sovereign, in Henryków, as the second daughter monastery of Lubiąż and the second Cistercian foundation in Silesia. From Henryków, the Cistercians of Lubiąż took over Krzeszów Abbey, which had been founded by the Benedictines forty years earlier. In 1231, the Cistercians of Lubiąż received the right to establish as many mills on the Oder as they pleased.

The region was devastated during the first Mongol invasion of Poland in 1241. However, Lubiąż monastery and its monastic properties were miraculously spared, leading the abbey to play a significant role in the rebuilding of the country. However, a stagnation started following the death of Duke Henry II the Pious on April 9, 1241 at the Battle of Legnica. Succession disputes resulted in the general disintegration of Silesia over the next few decades. Nevertheless, monks from Lubiąż came to Kamieniec in 1246 to take over the town's 1210-founded Augustinian monastery, officially settling it in 1249 following the intervention of Pope Innocent IV.

The last monastery founded by Lubiąż monks was the monastery at Byszewo, which was founded in 1256. However, the monastery quickly dissolved and in 1288 relocated to what is today Koronowo Monastery.

=== Economic and cultural revival ===
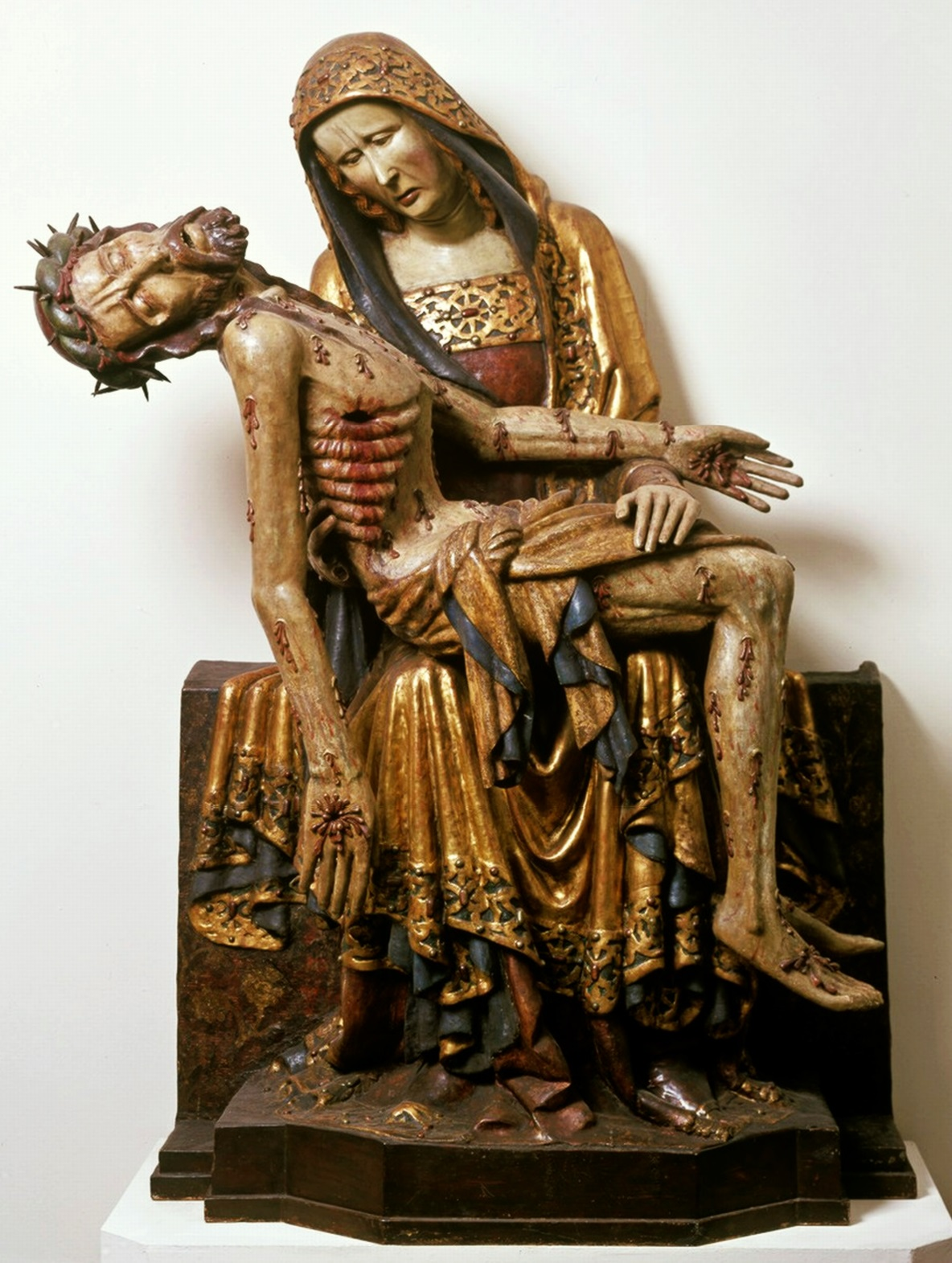
The Pietà of Lubiąż, dating to 1370 and now housed in the National Museum in Warsaw, dates to the Abbey's 14th century growth

By the middle of the 13th century, Lubiąż Abbey had founded around 70 villages, settled by German colonists. That the Aabey had become very wealthy by the late 13th century is evidenced by a 1280 complaint documenting the "incessant begging" of locals to partake in the abbey's riches. Monks at Lubiąż also composed the Chronicon Polono-Silesiacum around this time. By the 14th century Lubiąż became a cultural center of all East-Central Europe, with the monastery school and library (scriptorium) being especially notable. The economic strength of the monastery was consolidated from 1322 onwards by several gold mines in the area of Złotoryja and other mines. In 1327 the Silesian duke Henry VI the Good declared himself a vassal of King John of Bohemia, and when he died without male heirs in 1335, his lands including Lubiąż fell to the Kingdom of Bohemia. The monastery continuously expanded its land holdings and owned extensive estates and around 65 villages with large agricultural estates in Silesia, but also had properties in the east, near Oświęcim, and in the north, in Greater Poland.

The good financial situation made it possible to renovate the monastery buildings in a Gothic style, since the monastery church had become too small for the growing monastery. I 1307, the foundation stone for the new brick gothic basilica was laid. This phase of construction lasted for decades, and the current structure of the abbey church dates back to this era. In this time, several princely Chapels and tombs, such as that of Bolesław III the Generous, were built.

=== Decline and war ===
The heyday ended abruptly with the Hussite Wars, which reached Silesia from 1428. Lubiąż was affected not only as a Catholic center, but also because of its riches. The Hussites plundered and pillaged the complex, devastated large parts of the monastery's villages and plunged Lubiąż into a long economic crisis. The monastery had hardly recovered from these raids and had just restored the monastery buildings when, in 1492, Jan II the Mad expelled the Cistercian monks and repurposed the monastery to a hunting lodge. The Cistercians were not able to return until seven years later, when Jan II retired to Frankfurt an der Oder in Brandenburg.

In 1498, Andreas Hoffman became Abbot, continuing in this position until 1524. Hoffman returned the abbey back to its former purpose, and fortified it with stone earthen ramparts in the case of another war. In 1508, he had the abbey church, which had been in ruins since the Hussite invasion, restored. The expansive costs of this restoration were covered by the revival of the monastery economy.

With the advent of the reformation in 1517, the 16th century did not begin promisingly for the monastery. Over the course of this century, the abbey recorded ever-smaller entry numbers, and the foundation suffered. In addition, Protestant polities such as the Duchy of Legnica greatly expanded their holdings at the expense of the weakened abbey. Although Silesia was returned to Catholic hands by 1526, the monastery was unable to reverse its decline.

After almost two centuries of decline, the situation improved significantly under Abbot Rudolf von Hennersdorf. This development was initiated with the construction of the large gatehouse in 1601. This was followed by a renovation of the abbey Church from 1608 to 1636, which was refurbished in the baroque style. However, the Thirty Years' War brought yet another setback. The monastery was occupied by Swedish troops and their Saxon allies, who plundered the newly renovated Church. Significant portions of the monastery's library were plundered and sent down the Oder to the Swedish-occupied Stettin. There the plundered riches fell victim to a fire in 1679. During the occupation, the monks had to flee to Wrocław, which was largely unaffected by the war.

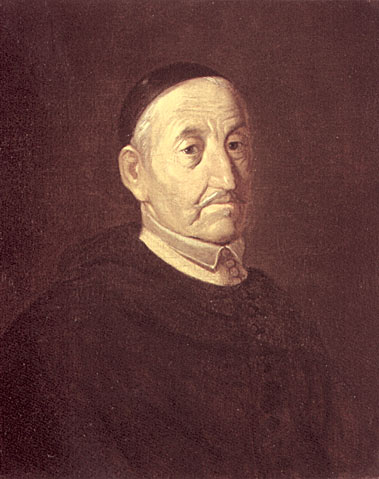
Abbot Freiberger, who initiated the abbey's rebuilding

=== Rebuilding and flowering after the Thirty Years' War ===
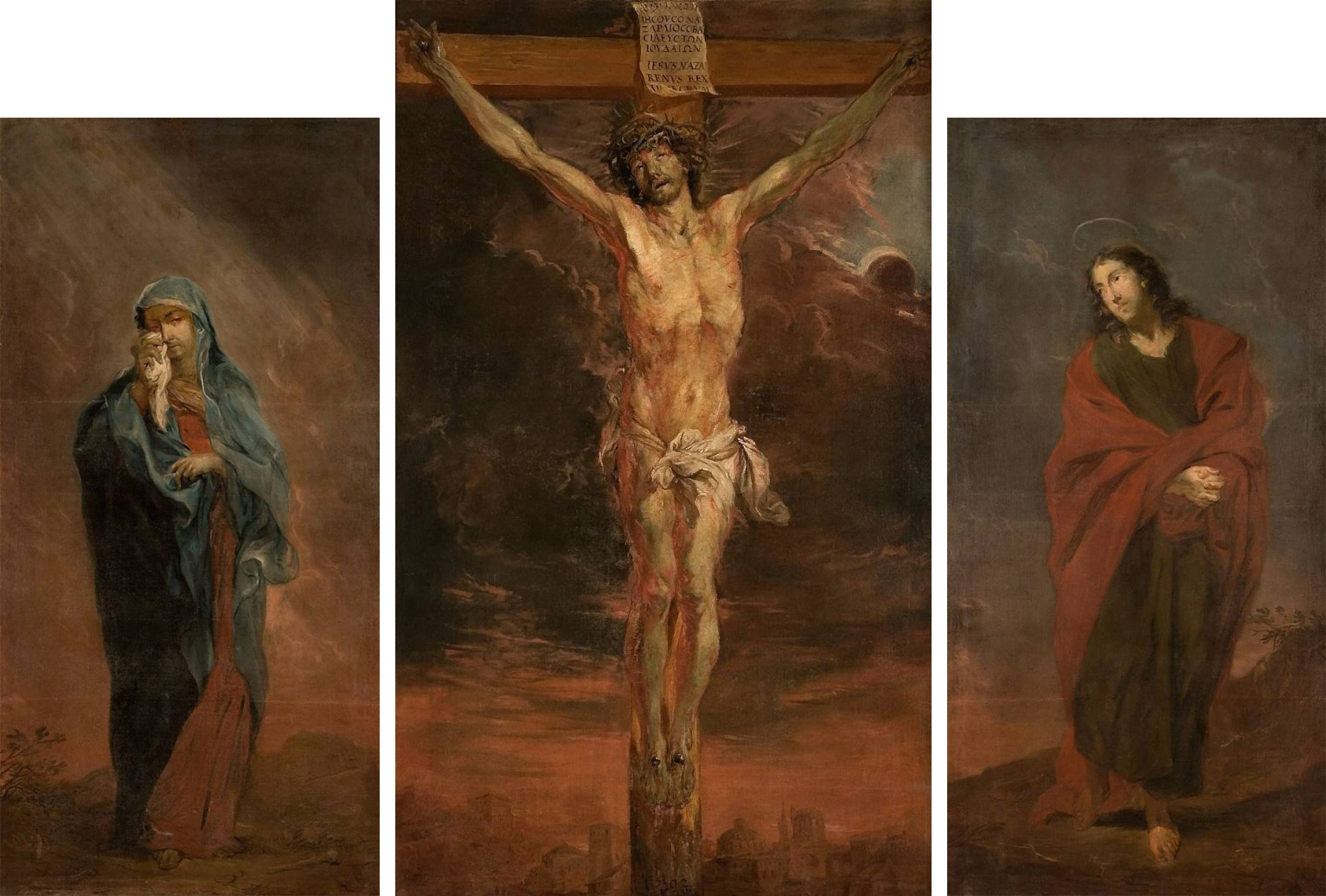
Crucifixion by Michael Willman, painted in 1702 for the Abbey Church

After the end of the war, the Counter-Reformation reached what was then Austrian Silesia. All over the abbey's area, existing buildings were renovated and new buildings were built in the baroque style. Despite the traditional Cistercian compulsion towards modest architecture, the open-minded monks did not object to the exuberant baroque renovations. Abbot Arnold Freiberger (abbot 1636–1672) presided over this growth. The abbey's many destroyed revenue sources were rebuilt, and many new ones were built. With the economic upturn, the enormous debts, especially taken on during the war, could be paid off. The Habsburgs took a personal hand in the rebuilding of the abbey, seeing it as a means to reconstruct the influence of Catholicism in the area. One prominent example of the abbey's role in the Counter-Reformation was the construction of St. Valentine's Parish Church in Lubiąż village. Despite these successes, the Protestant-settled villages and their Protestant rulers around the monastery restricted its growth and stymied the efforts of the Counter-Reformation in Silesia.

Because of the gradual defeat of Protestantism in Silesia, Lubiąż Monastery regained great cultural importance. In 1660, Arnold Freiberger had recruited the painter Michael Willmann to work for the monastery. Before that, Willmann worked at the Prussian court in Berlin and Königsberg, but he opened his workshop in Lubiąż in 1666, where he was able to carry out lucrative orders not only for Lubiąż but also for other Cistercian institutions in the area. In the 40 years that he spent in Lubiąż, the abbey became a center of Silesian baroque painting, thanks in part to its skilled workshop staff. Willmann died in 1706 and was buried in the monastery crypt, even though he was not a monk, as an expression of gratitude towards the artist.

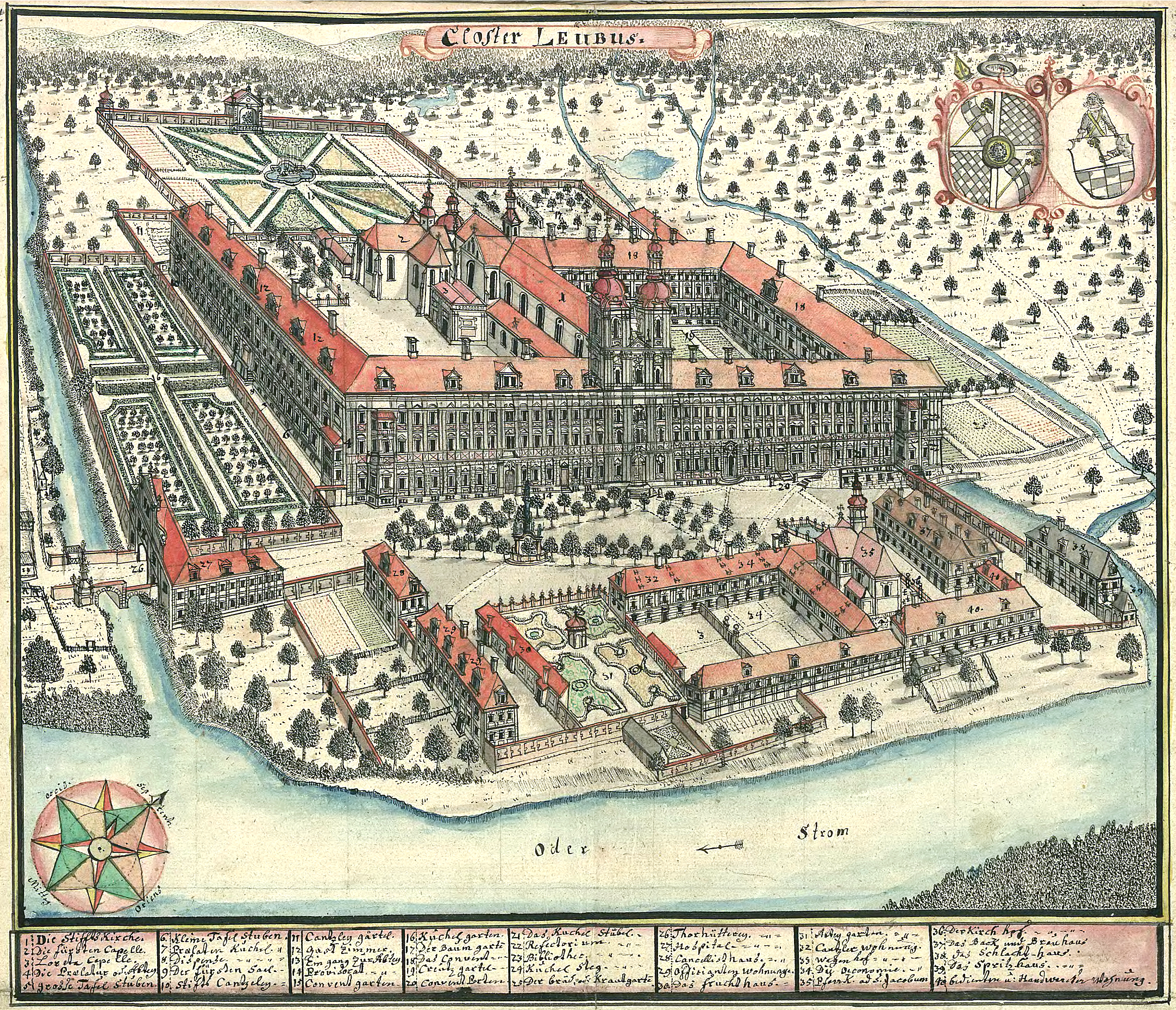
18th-century depiction of the abbey

In 1672, Johann Reich was elected Abbot of Lubiąż. Abbot Reich continued the work of his predecessor until 1691 and the good financial situation of the monastery enabled him to redesign the monastery. The first construction project, the renovation of the princely chapel, started in 1670 under Reich's predecessor, Freiberger, and was completed ten years later. The redesign of the monastery church of the Assumption took place from 1672 to 1681. The predominantly Gothic monastery buildings were torn down. The two wings of the new complex were completed in 1699, but due to lack of funds further expansion of the complex was abandoned. Reich's successors continued the interior renovation of the monastery well into the 18th century. The abbots had a town house erected in Legnica, and perhaps the most visible feature of the modern abbey, the double-towered facade, was completed. In 1727, a calvary hill was built near the village of Lubiąż.

=== Prussian era and secularization ===
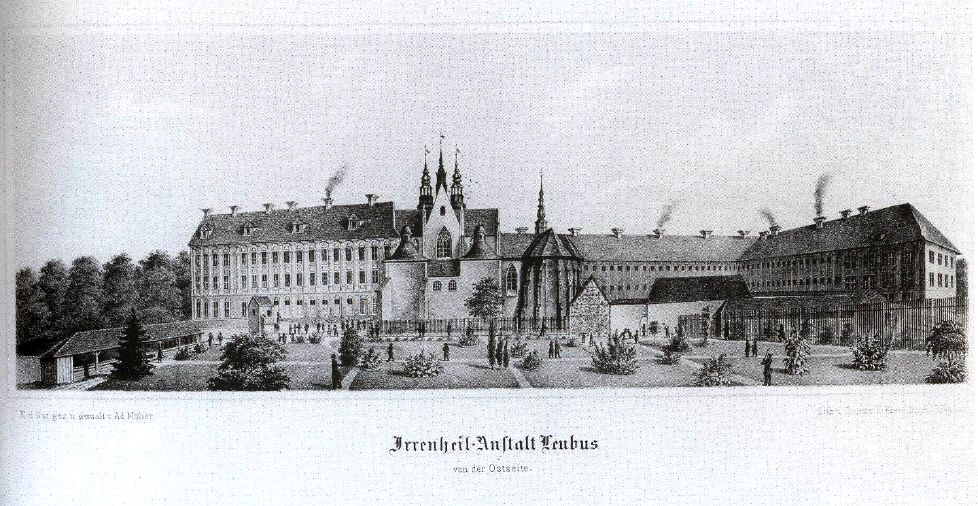
An 1870 view of the abbey as an asylum ("Irrenheil")

While the monastery benefited from the Habsburg rulers and the Counter-Reformation led by them, the abbey's heyday was abruptly ended in 1742. After the First Silesian War, victorious Prussia was awarded almost all of Silesia, and with it Lubiąż abbey, in the Treaty of Berlin. Even though the Protestant Prussians were, in principle, tolerant of Catholic beliefs, state Protestantism inevitably took its toll on the abbey. Due to the disenfranchisement of the great Catholic foundations, the abbey's revenue sources quickly dried up. The abbey buckled under high tax duties, and was forced to sell off large portions of its treasury, including much of its coin collection, gem-encrusted gold and silver liturgical vessels, and precious vestments. The abbey orchestra, which performed in the Prince's Hall, was dissolved and the instruments and scores left behind for sale. Finally, the abbey was dissolved on November 21, 1810. The holdings of the abbey, including 59 villages, 32 farms, a brickyard, and a handful of small manufactories, were nationalized. A year later, after the closure, 471 valuable paintings, including several by Willmann, were relocated to the new Gemäldegalerie in Wrocław. The same was done with large portions of the monastery library and archives. At the time of dissolution, the abbey counted as its members 47 brothers, 2 clerics, and 2 lay brothers.

During the wars of liberation against Napoleon Bonaparte in 1813, the monastery buildings found a new use as a prison for captive Russian soldiers, and later, as a hospital for them. After the end of the war, the hospital was no longer needed, so the abbey was split between a royal stud farm (established in 1817) and an insane asylum (established in 1823). The main complex of the abbey was divided between a public asylum in the convent wing and a facility for wealthier patients in the prelature. In 1818, the abbey church was made a parish church, and outlying buildings were converted to municipal purposes.The abbey served these two purposes up until World War II, and the facilities were extensively redone to fit their new uses. By the late 19th century, the Prussian state made extensive efforts to preserve the grand baroque interiors while keeping the asylum and stud farm open.

=== Use in World War II and aftermath ===
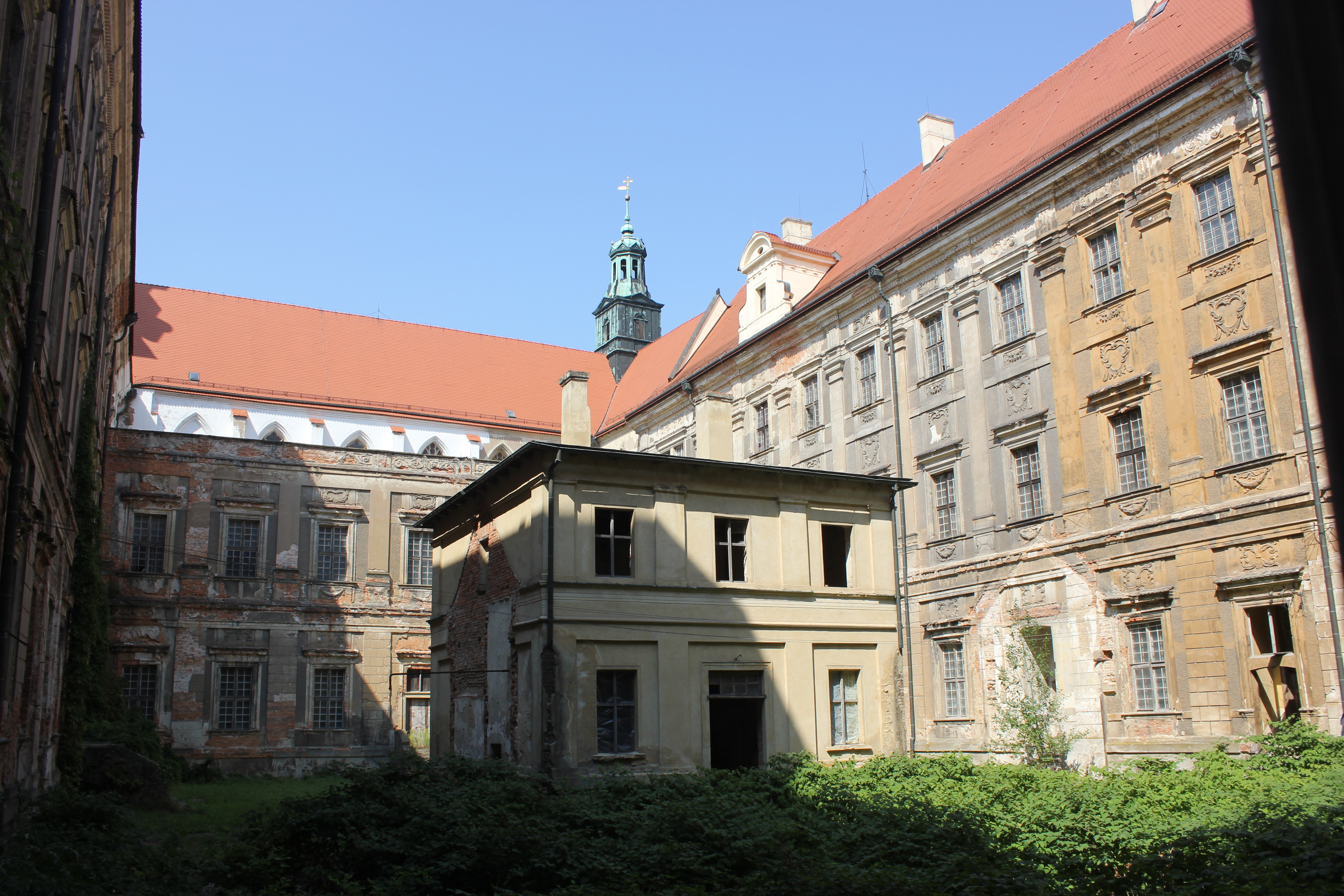
Unrestored cloister at Lubiąż, showing the effect of decades of neglect on the complex. The building in the middle of the cloister is a laundry, dating back to the complex's psychiatric usage.

In 1936, the stud farm housed in the monastery was relocated to Książ Castle. Adolf Hitler is alleged to have visited the abbey in 1936. By 1942, the asylum was shut down for good, and the Abbey became the location of a Telefunken factory and research laboratories for developing radar receivers, resulting in the dismantling of many of the abbey's interior furnishings. A company called “Schlesische Werkstätten Dr. Fürstenau & Co., GmbH ” also set up shop in the abbey. These companies manufactured armaments using forced laborers from German-occupied Luxembourg and Slovenia, most notably manufacturing engines for V1 and V2 rockets. In January 1943, plans were drawn up to build high-voltage lines to the former monastery and a small sewage treatment plant was built. In addition, two new Oder crossings were built and the area was equipped with fog systems to protect it from enemy aircraft. In March of the same year, Gauleiter Karl Hanke visited the plant with a delegation from Telefunken. In this time, any religious functions the abbey still held were completely terminated to keep the factories and labs under strict secrecy. The Luxembourgish prisoners were either deported to other concentration camps or murdered by the Germans on the spot. On January 25, 1945, the entire facility was evacuated, and the files housed in it were destroyed or lost. The functions of the monastery during World War II are still somewhat nebulous to this day due to this destruction. In 1985, a commemorative plaque was unveiled to commemorate the Luxembourg forced laborers who died at the abbey.

Despite the functions of the Abbey, it was never directly damaged during the war. Following the end of the war, in 1945, the abbey became again part of Poland. Soldiers of the victorious Red Army were quartered in the empty complex, and a psychiatric hospital for them was set up. During this time, significant damage was inflicted upon the abbey, with interior decorations being deliberately defaced, wooden furnishings burned in stoves, and crypts being robbed for valuables. Consequently, only one set of remains in the abbey crypt can still be identified (the mummy of Michael Willman), with the rest of the remains having been disturbed and eventually deposited into a pile.

=== Decay, restoration, and current use ===
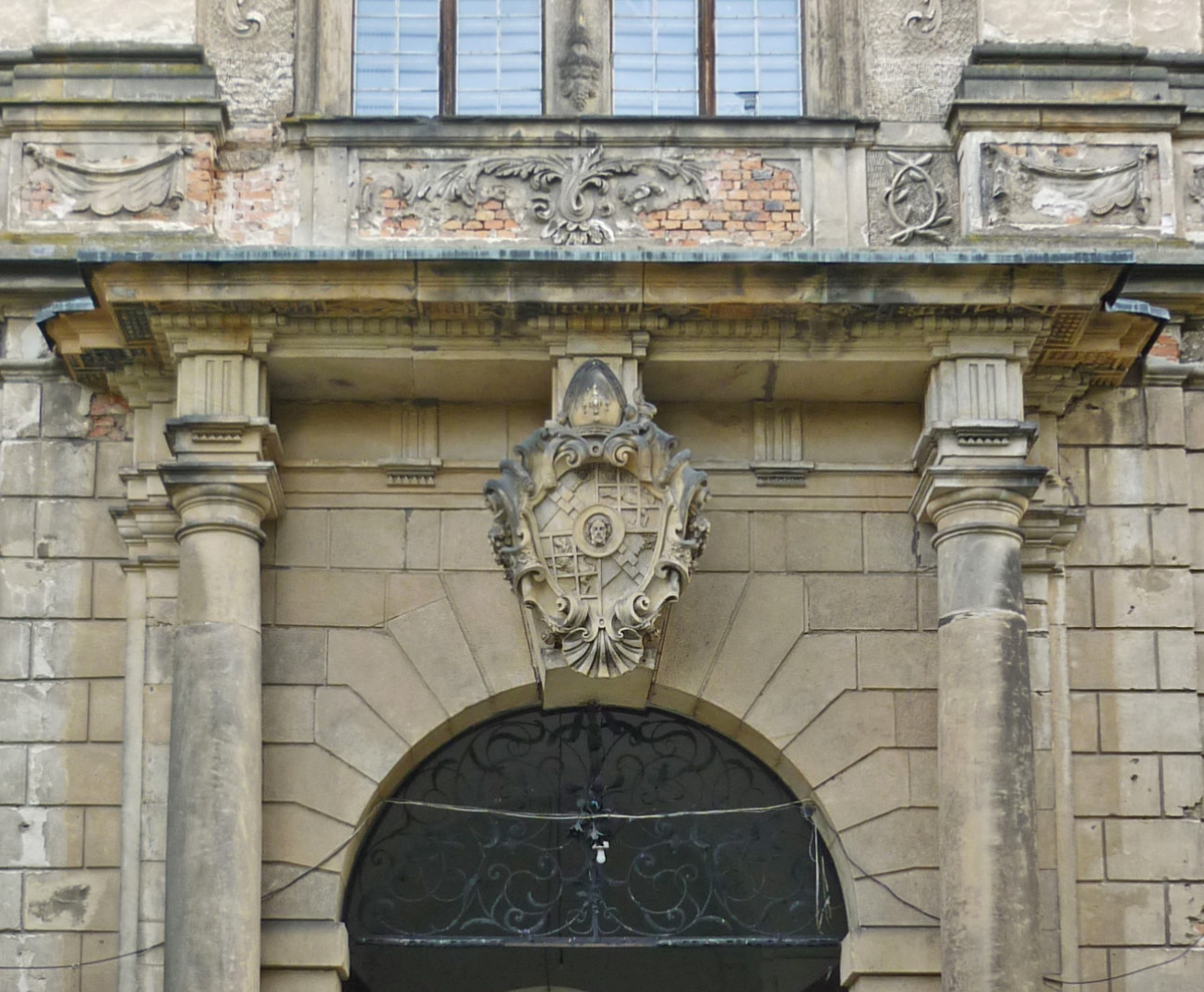
A doorway before (2015)...

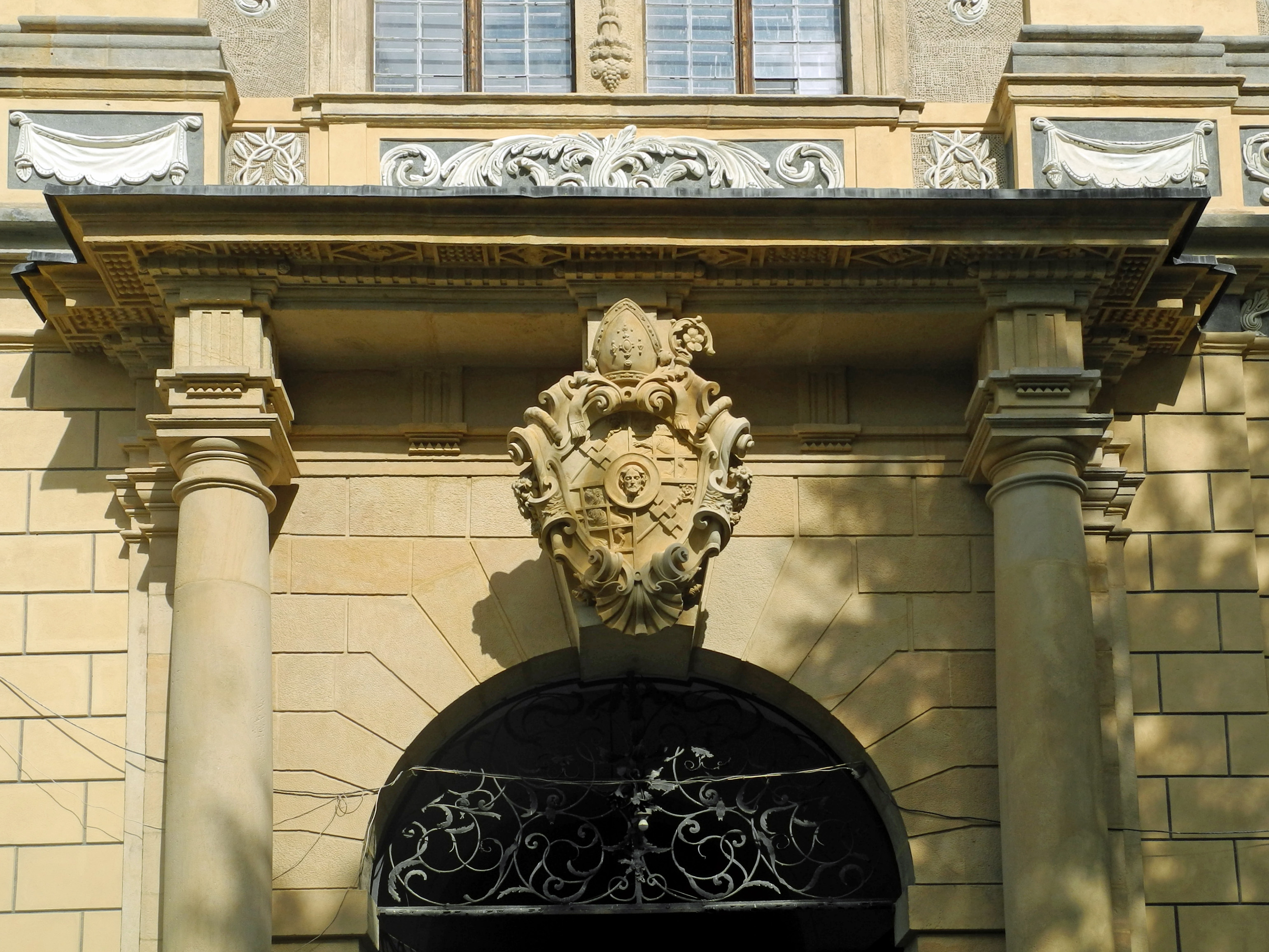
and after (2025) restoration

After the Red Army soldiers withdrew in 1950, the devastated monastery was left mostly unused. The convent wing was used as a book depot by the Warsaw Book House. After the last renovation in 1937, no major further repairs or renovations were carried out, so the abbey fell into disrepair over the next few years. Additionally, the new Soviet-installed communist government had little interest in comprehensively restoring Lubiąż, apparently seeing it as a monument to Catholicism and Ostsiedlung, both of which it was opposed to. In 1962, some restoration works began, and in 1967, the prelature was given to the National Museum in Wrocław for future museum use.

After the end of the communist dictatorship in Poland in 1989, major repair work began again for the first time since 1937. For this purpose, a foundation for the monastery, the Fundacja Lubiąż, was established on September 9, 1989, which took full ownership of the monastery grounds. The foundation has been renovating the monastery with donations to since then. It receives financial support from the Foundation for German-Polish Cooperation, among other sources. In 1996 the restoration of the Prince's Hall was completed, the hall opened to visitors and in 2000. The abbey's roofing was fully replaced, and the monastery buildings were secured in an elaborate process with hundreds of anchors embedded in the walls. As one of the most important baroque complexes in Europe and because of its great importance for Polish history, the abbey also has the status of a listed building of class 0, which is the highest category for Polish monuments. In 1990 the Council of Europe decided to set up a Cistercian cultural route, connecting the abbey to other Cistercian foundations in Europe. Intending to revive the monastery for investment, the Fundacja Lubiąż has attracted multiple possible buyers, including Michael Jackson, who briefly toured the monastery after a concert in 1997.

In 2016, Guillaume, Hereditary Grand Duke of Luxembourg and his wife Stéphanie visited the abbey to commemorate the Luxembourgish victims of Nazi Germany.

At the moment only very few rooms are used. The main preserved halls are open for group tours. In the Summer Refectory and in the northern part of the Prelature, there are rotating exhibitions on Silesian topics, organized by the Silesian House Association. The Prince's Hall was already used as a ballroom when it was built and today is used as a dignified venue for concerts and balls.

In the last two decades, various propositions have been made for the future of the abbey, including one that plans to convert the abbey into a convention center and luxury hotel. To date, only the gatehouse and barn has been fully restored and new roofs have been installed over the entire abbey. The main facade is gradually being restored, from north to south. The costs of restoration are extremely high, and progress is slow. Artistic and musical events are frequently held at the abbey in order to raise funds for restoration, such as the SLOT Art Festival or Electrocity music festival.

== Architecture ==
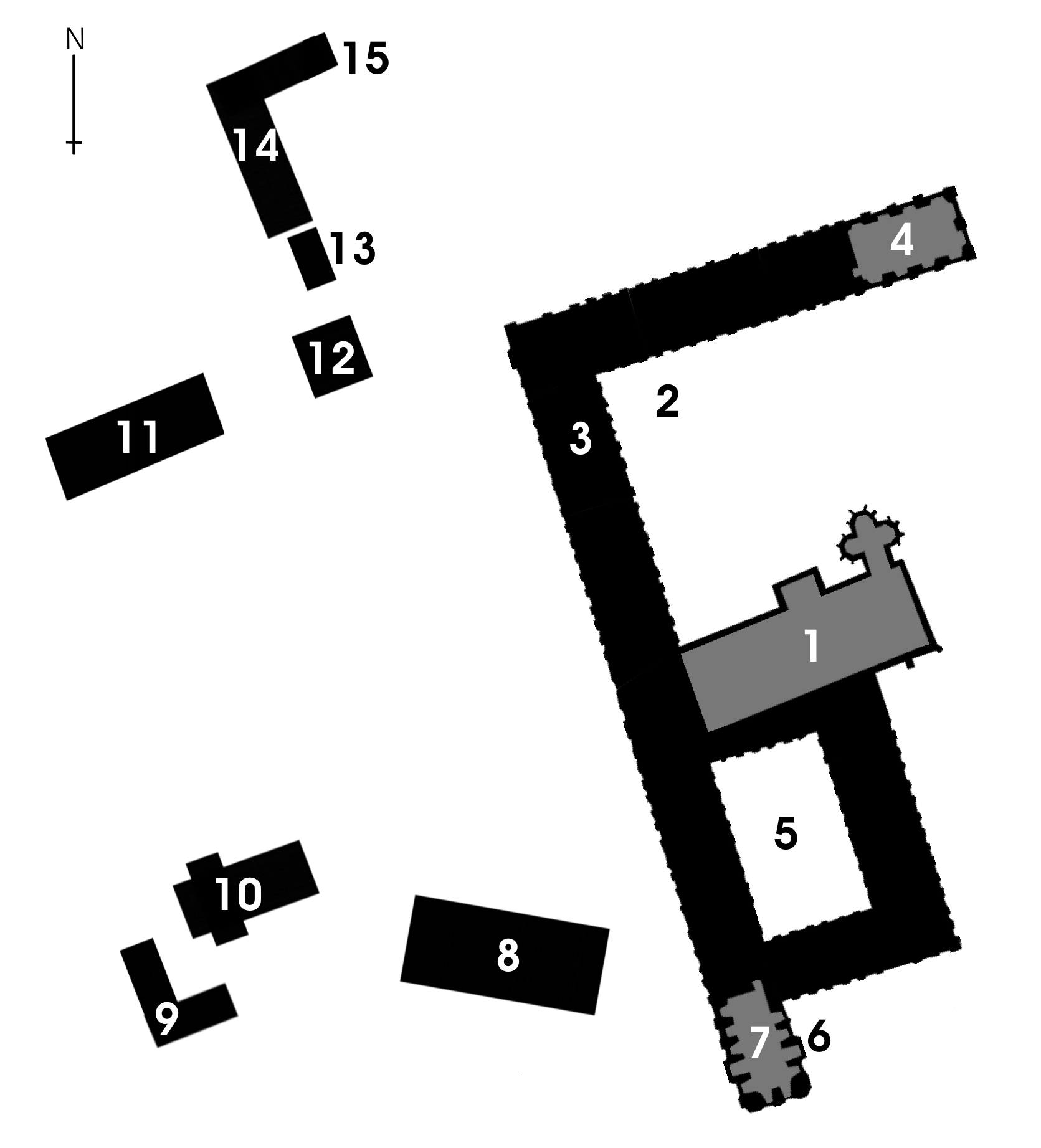
Plan of the abbey's grounds:1 Abbey Church; 2 Prelature; 3 Abbot's Dining Room; 4 Prince's Hall; 5 Convent Wing; 6 Summer Refectory; 7 Library; 8 Brewery and Bakery; 9 Craftsman's Building; 10 Church of St. Jacob; 11 Abbey Vicar's House; 12 Abbey Chancellery; 13 Abbey Barn; 14 Abbey Hospital; 15 Gatehouse

=== Structure of the Abbey ===
The abbey can generally be said to have an upside-down "L" shape. The main facade of the abbey, the long part of the "L" is separated in two halves by the abbey church.

To the north of the abbey church is the Prelature or Abbot's Palace, which was constructed from 1681 to 1699. The Prelature consists of the aforementioned northern half of the main facade and a 118-meter long east wing, this being the upper part of the upside-down "L". The prelature encloses a surface area of 6,350 m²and a volume of 87,800 m³.

South of the church is the Convent Wing, which is planned around a quadrangular courtyard. Constructed from 1692 to 1710, it contains 30 rooms in each of its three floors, enclosing a total surface area of 6.402 m² and a volume of 190,000 m³. The Convent Wing suffered the most damage in the postwar era, having been used by the Red Army, and many of its cells and smaller rooms are in urgent need of restoration. Graffiti from the Abbey's brief postwar use by the Red Army can still be seen in the main stairwell, where Soviet soldiers left graffiti depicting red stars and hammer-and-sickles. The Summer Refectory and Library account for the entirety of the most southern portion of the abbey's main facade, jutting out slightly from the Convent Wing.

The entirety of the pilastered main facade is 223 m long. This is the longest abbey facade in the world, longer than that of El Escorial (207 m). Only the handful most architecturally important interiors of the over 300 rooms in the abbey have been restored.

=== Church of the Assumption of Mary ===
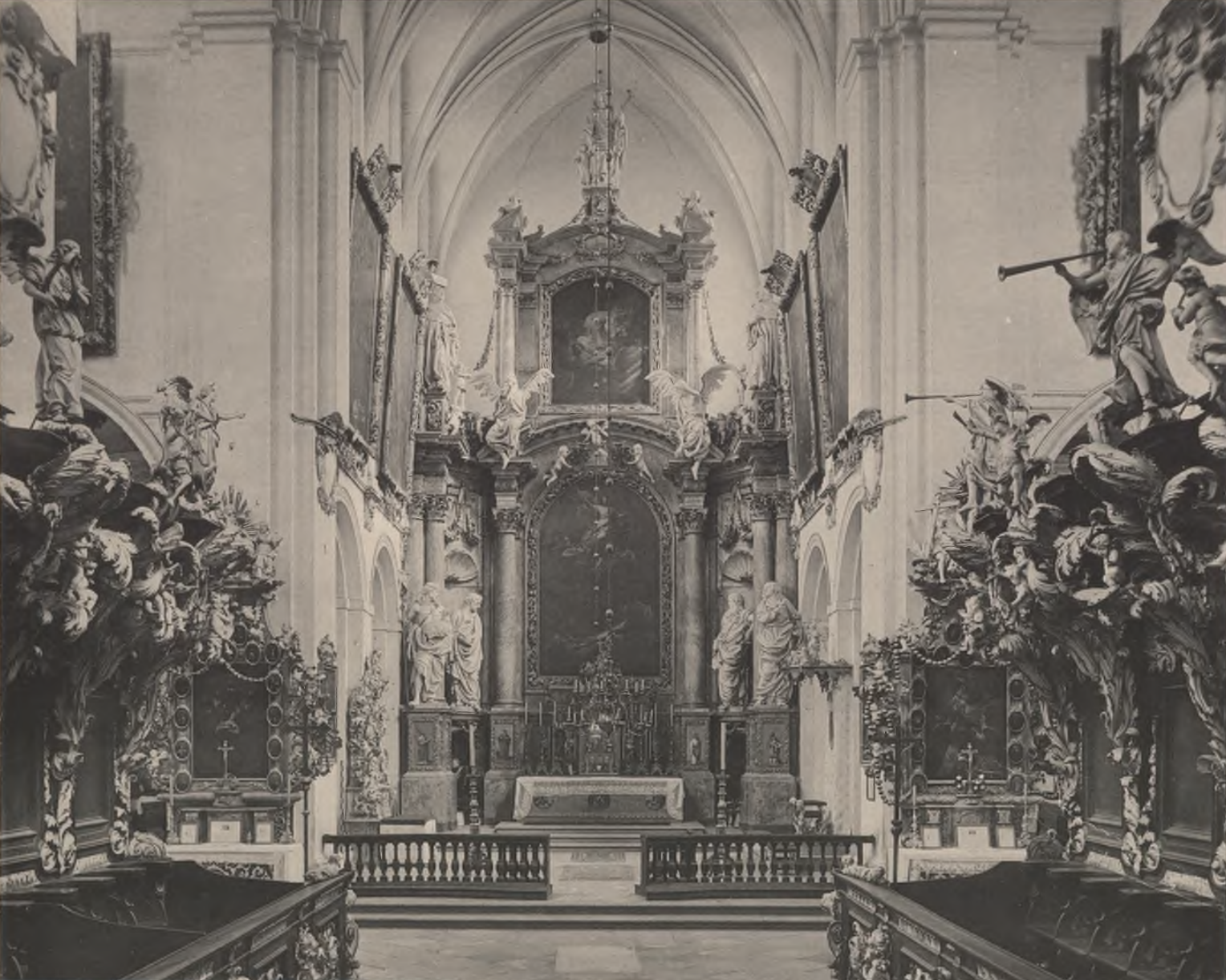
A view towards the high altar in 1903

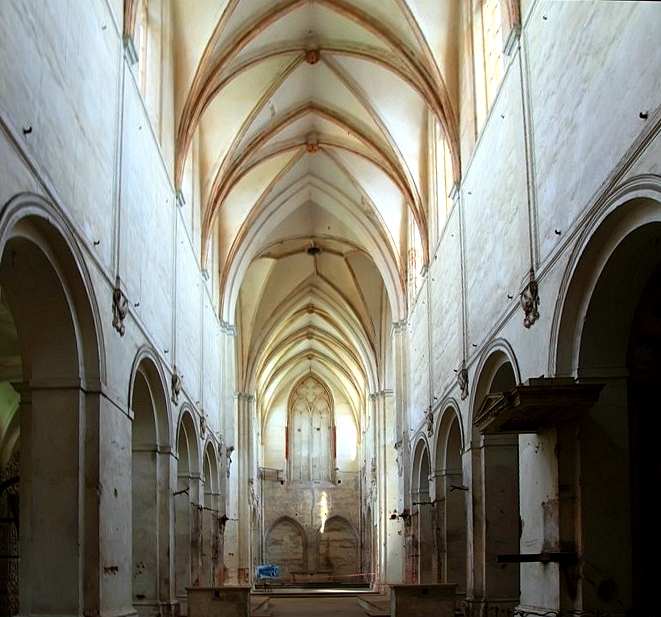
...and a similar view in 2010

Even before the arrival of the Cistercian monks from Pforta, a wooden church had been built. With the increasing importance of the monastery, a new church became necessary, which was completed around 1200. The Romanesque church was a simple, three-aisle basilica. This corresponded to the austere rules of the Cistercian order. This church was the first brick vaulted building in Poland. Later re-buildings have erased most traces of this ancient church, save for a decorated piscina in the Choir.

The abbey church attained its present form towards the end of the 13th century. The old Romanesque church was demolished and the foundations were partially used for its larger successor building. Bricks were again the principal material and stone was used for architectural detailing. The three-aisle floor plan with a straight end of the choir was retained and supplemented by a rectangular ambulatory. The cruciform Gothic structure was vaulted, with vine-themed keystones enclosing the vaults. The transept and choir were completed and consecrated in 1330, and the vaults and western nave were completed in the late 14th century.

The Prince's Chapel was erected at the northeast corner of the ambulatory from 1311-1329 by Bolesław III the Generous to house his tomb. Its unique triconch construction, the only of its kind in Silesia, is thought to have been designed by a master mason from the Rhineland. Its ceilings were decorated with allegorical paintings glorifying the Silesian Piasts in the 1670s. The tomb of Bolesław III, which once was the centerpiece of the chapel, was damaged by Soviet soldiers and later restored and moved to Wrocław's National Museum in the 1980s. The chapel is now empty as with the rest of the church.

The destruction wrought by the Hussites was only repaired in 1508. New chapels, an organ, and a tabernacle were also built in the early 16th century.

In the 17th century the church was redesigned several times, although it retained its Gothic structure. In keeping with the taste of the Renaissance, the interior was repainted in the early 17th century, and the choir was redecorated with a new high altar, pulpit and choir stalls. After the looting by the Swedes in 1638, the church had to be repaired again. Abbot Freiberger had the church renovated, and a new organ was bought for 1000 thalers. Seven baroque paintings, intended for the choir, of the martyrdoms of the Apostles were commissioned for Michael Willmann at the same time.

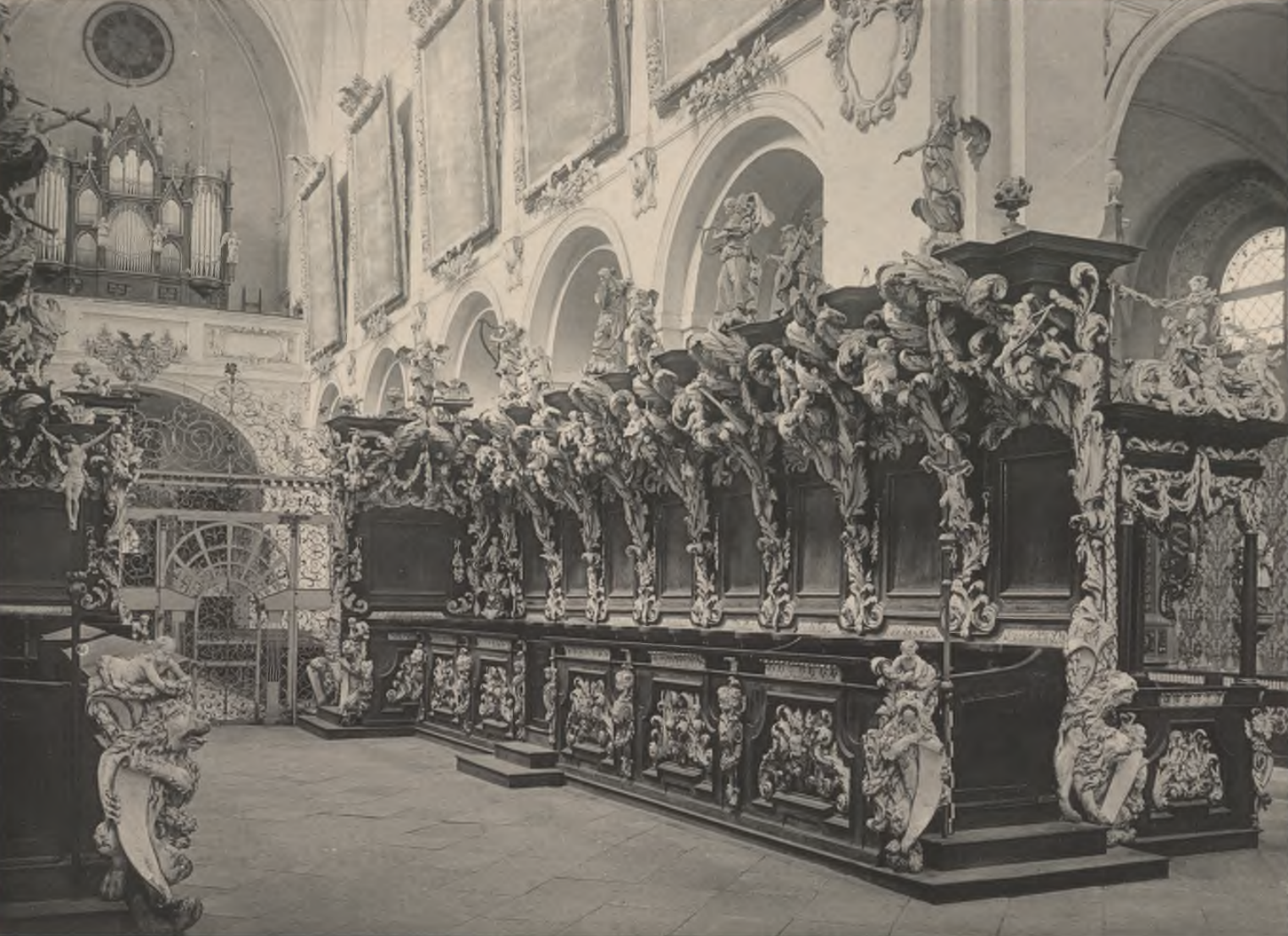
The choir stalls in 1903

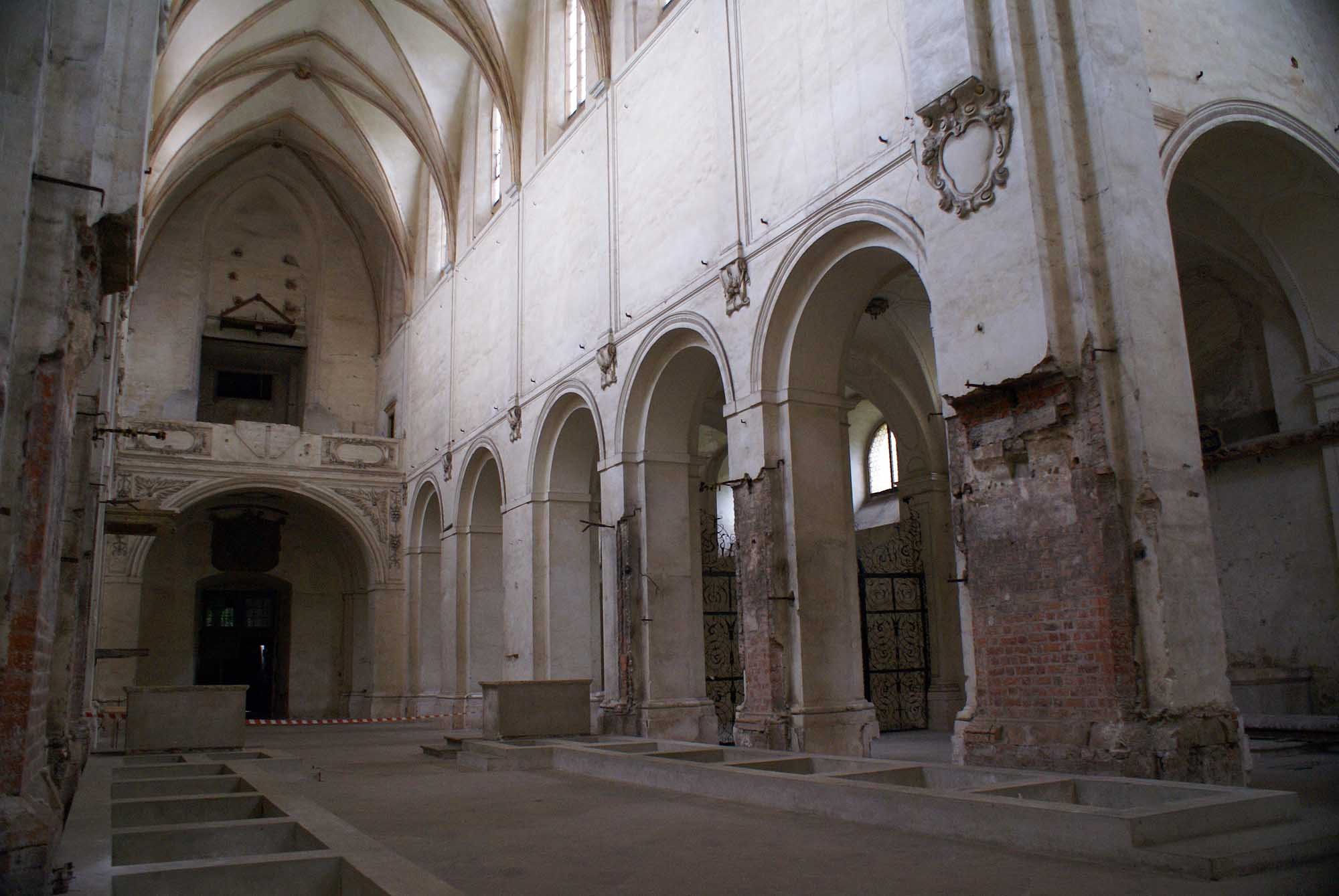
...and their site in 2008

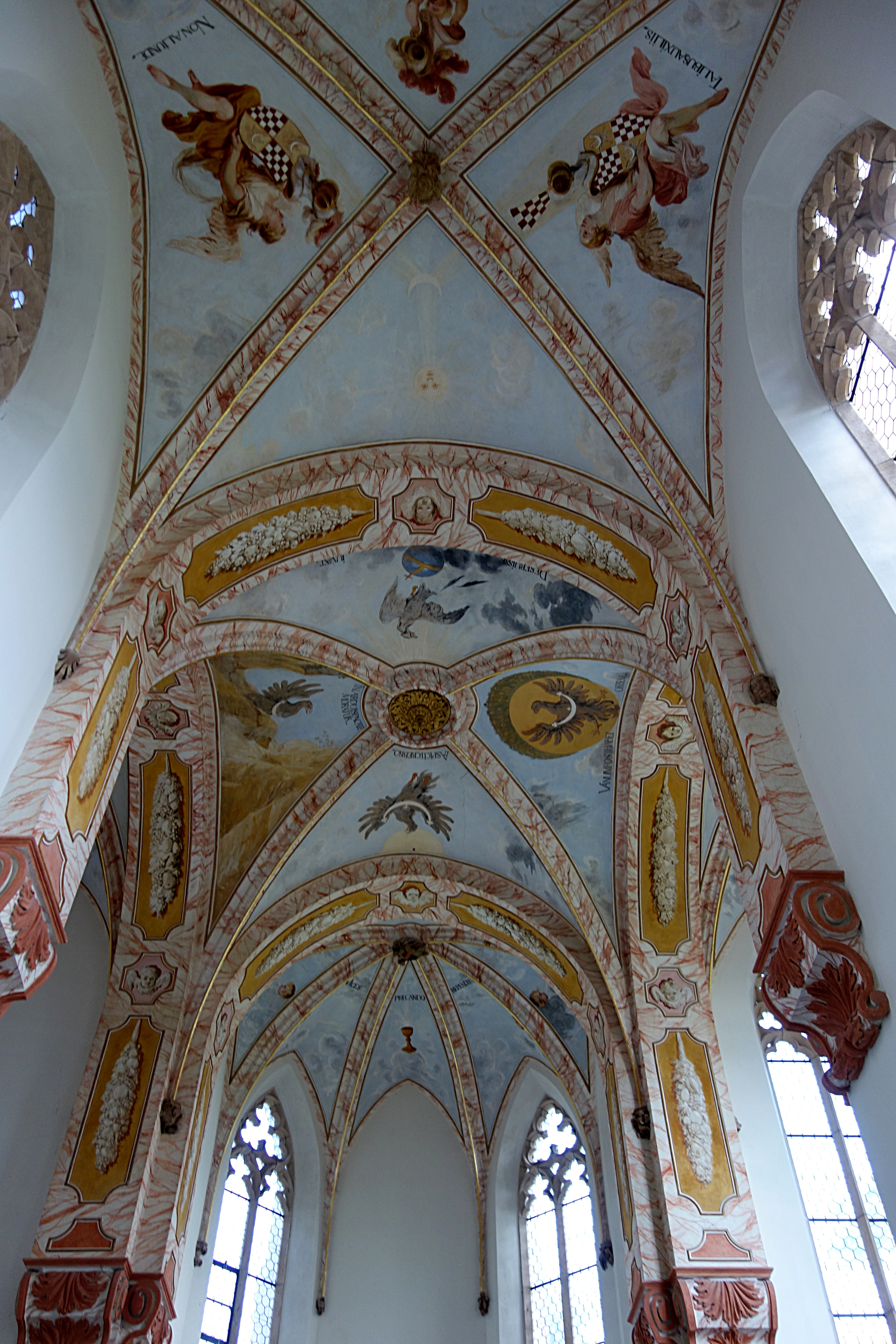
The ceiling of the Prince's chapel

The interior of the church was comprehensively redesigned in Baroque style. From 1672 to 1682 the aisles were widened and decorated barrel vaulting added. The Gothic arches and the pillars of the central nave were fundamentally redesigned. "Open" chapels were laid out on the north and south corners of the ambulatory, covered with domes and with altars of St. Benedict and St. Bernard. The domes were decorated with stucco and frescoes in 1691/92. In the ambulatory, a memorial for the eight bishops of Wrocław interred there and valuable choir grille were erected in 1701. In 1781 a new high altar was erected, an artistic collaboration between Michael Willmann and sculptor Matthias Steinl. In total, Michael Willmann created 14 large baroque paintings for the church. At the beginning of the 18th century, the church was given a magnificent front with the new main facade. The new twin towers were crowned with baroque domes and the newly created space became the vestibule. From there a baroque portal led into the church. A Loreto chapel was also built north of the transept, in keeping with current European trends. It would later be converted to a sacristy after the abbey church became a parish. Over the next few centuries, minor renovations and repairs to this structure were made, with the biggest project being the renewal of Gothic windows from 1934-1937.

The interior of the church, as with the rest of the abbey, was partially dismantled by the German Army during the building's tenure as a factory, and all but destroyed by plundering soldiers of the Red Army after the end of the war. The crypt was used to safeguard art during the war and ransacked by soldiers of the Red Army afterwards; the church continued to be stripped of remaining valuables into until the abbey's acquisition by the Fundacja Lubiąż. Apart from a few picture frames, remnants of the pulpit, the wrought-iron choir grille, and the restored polychrome ceiling paintings of the Prince's Chapel, nothing has been preserved of the interiors and furnishings of the monastery church. Today the church is almost in its original Gothic appearance, as all baroque decorations having been removed or, like most of the altars, burned. The surviving altars and stalls were moved to the parish church in Stężyca in the immediate aftermath of the World War II in order to replace furnishings destroyed by the German invaders there. The so-called "angel stalls" that once decorated the Choir were mainly burned, with the remains being exhibited in Brzeg's ducal castle. Some traces of the organ "nest" are still visible. In the 1990s, the crypt was restored, and the bodies of 93 monks (and Willmann) were identified in a complete form and reinterred in new baroque-style coffins.

=== Baroque interiors ===
==== Old refectory/Abbot's dining room ====
The Old refectory, now Abbot's dining room is located in the northern wing of the Prelature. It was decorated between 1690 and 1691 by Michael L. Willmann. The frescos have Greek mythological themes, with a hero's apotheosis and the god Dionysus being displayed. The rectangular main painting is surrounded by 14 smaller medallions that continue the themes and are embedded in white stucco. The stucco and frescoes were covered by a wooden drop ceiling in the 19th century, when the refectory was used as an apartment for the resident doctor at the hospital. Some antique furniture is displayed in the hall, along with various art exhibitions organized by the Museum of Silesian Regional Studies.

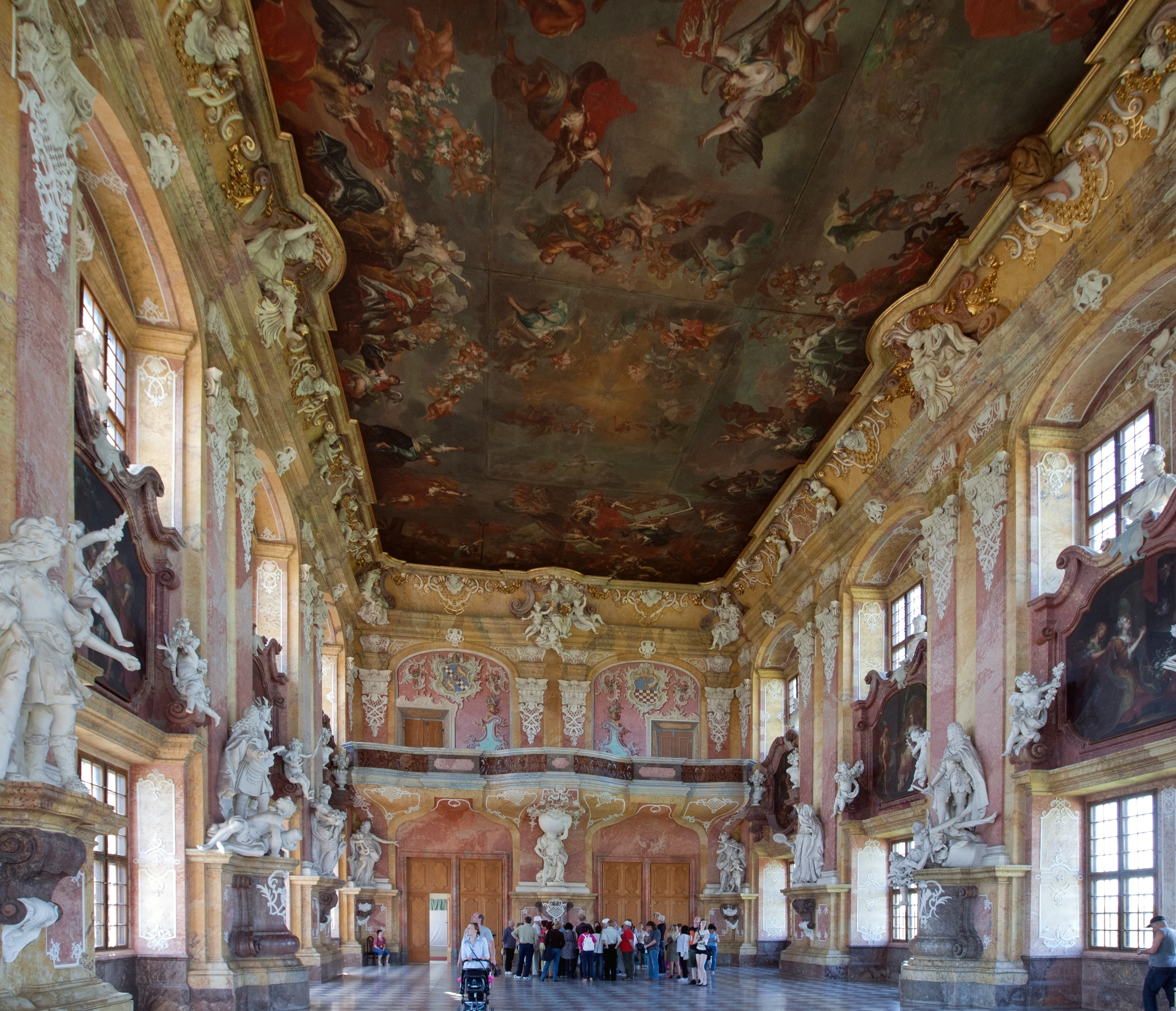
The west end of the restored Prince's Hall

==== Prince's Hall ====
With a length of 28.5 meters, a width of 14.8 meters, and a height of 13.9 meters, the Prince's Hall is the largest and most important room of the Abbey. It is situated in the easternmost portion of the Prelature's east wing. Historian Georg Dehio described it as "the most magnificent ballroom of Silesia". It was restored from 1990–1995. The Prince's Hall forms the eastern end of the prelature.

A long, one-story corridor leads to an exuberant baroque portal which occupies the entire wall, and dramatically opens into the two-story tall hall. The portal is framed by two larger-than-life atlases, an Indian and a Moor. The upper end of the polychrome portal frame, made of white stucco, shows the abbey coat of arms with two supporters.

The hall occupies two floors, and there is a gallery on the west side of the hall. Between the two rows of windows are ten scenes, by Christian Philipp Bentum, from the life of Empress Elisabeth Christine of Brunswick-Wolfenbüttel. Busts of Habsburg rulers are placed above them. The ballroom was built in the last construction phase of the monastery from 1734 to 1738 and represents one of the most magnificent of the European baroque. The walls and portals are altogether richly decorated with paint and stucco.

The dominant work of art in the hall is the ceiling fresco, which extends over 360 square meters. These are ten paintings that are attached to the wooden ceiling construction and together make up one of the largest and most outstanding frescos in Poland. Its creator, Christian Philipp Bentum, immortalized himself in the south corner with a self-portrait and a signature including the year 1732. In the ceiling painting, the iconography of the Princely Hall reaches its climax with glorifications of the Silesian Piasts, who founded the monastery, the Habsburg Monarchy, to which Lubiąż owed its heyday, and the Catholic Church. On the edge of the western part of the ceiling painting is the defeat of the Battle of Liegnitz (1241) depicted with the Silesian Duke Henry II. Henry's ancestor Boleslaw I is depicted founding the monastery. Putti with the monastery coat of arms climb up to his right. On the opposite side there is Maria Theresa in front of battle scenes, which depict the victory of the Catholic faith over demons, vices and heresies. The long sides show in the north of the scene of the marriage of Maria Theresa to Francis I, and the personifications of power and moderation, flanked by the victory of Chronos over Vanitas.

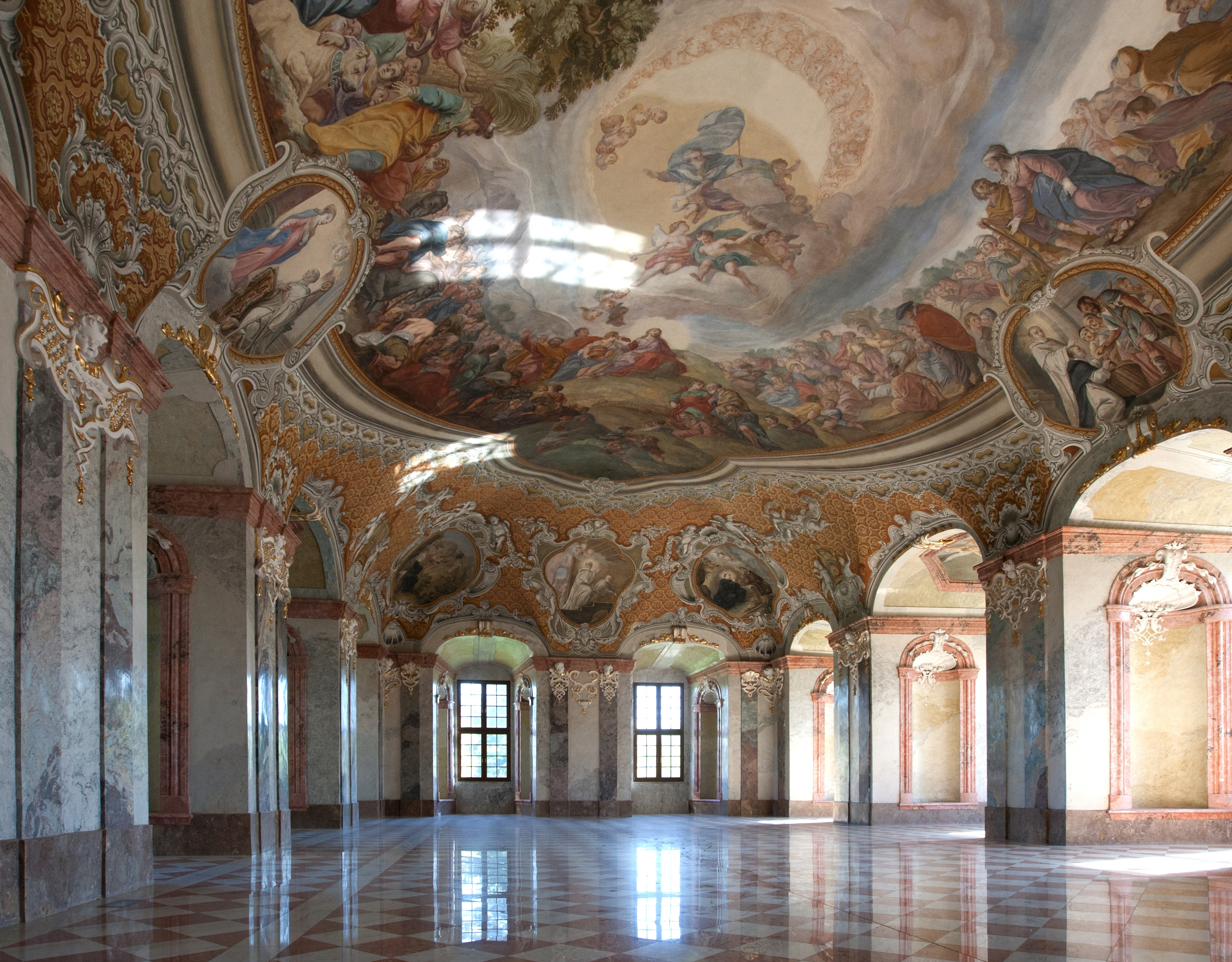
The restored interior of the Summer Refectory

==== Summer (Main) refectory ====
The Summer (Main) refectory is housed on the ground floor of the southern end of the Convent Wing. The library occupies the next two floors. Although the ceiling is vaulted and has the appearance of extensive stuccoing, the surface is actually two-dimensional and decorated with extensive trompe-l'œil painting. The ceiling paintings dating to 1733 are by Felix Anton Scheffler, and show, in keeping with the use as a dining room at the time, the biblical scene of the Miracle of Loaves and Fishes. The large fresco is surrounded by eight smaller, oval paintings that show scenes from the lives of Bernard of Clairvaux and Benedict of Nursia. A curved portal made of black marble with the year 1706 shows an extract from the rule of the order leads into the hall: “SUMMUM FIAT SILENTIUM AD MENSAM. CAP: 38 REG: “, which indicates silence during the meal. The frescoes have been completely renovated and the marble floor has now been re-done.

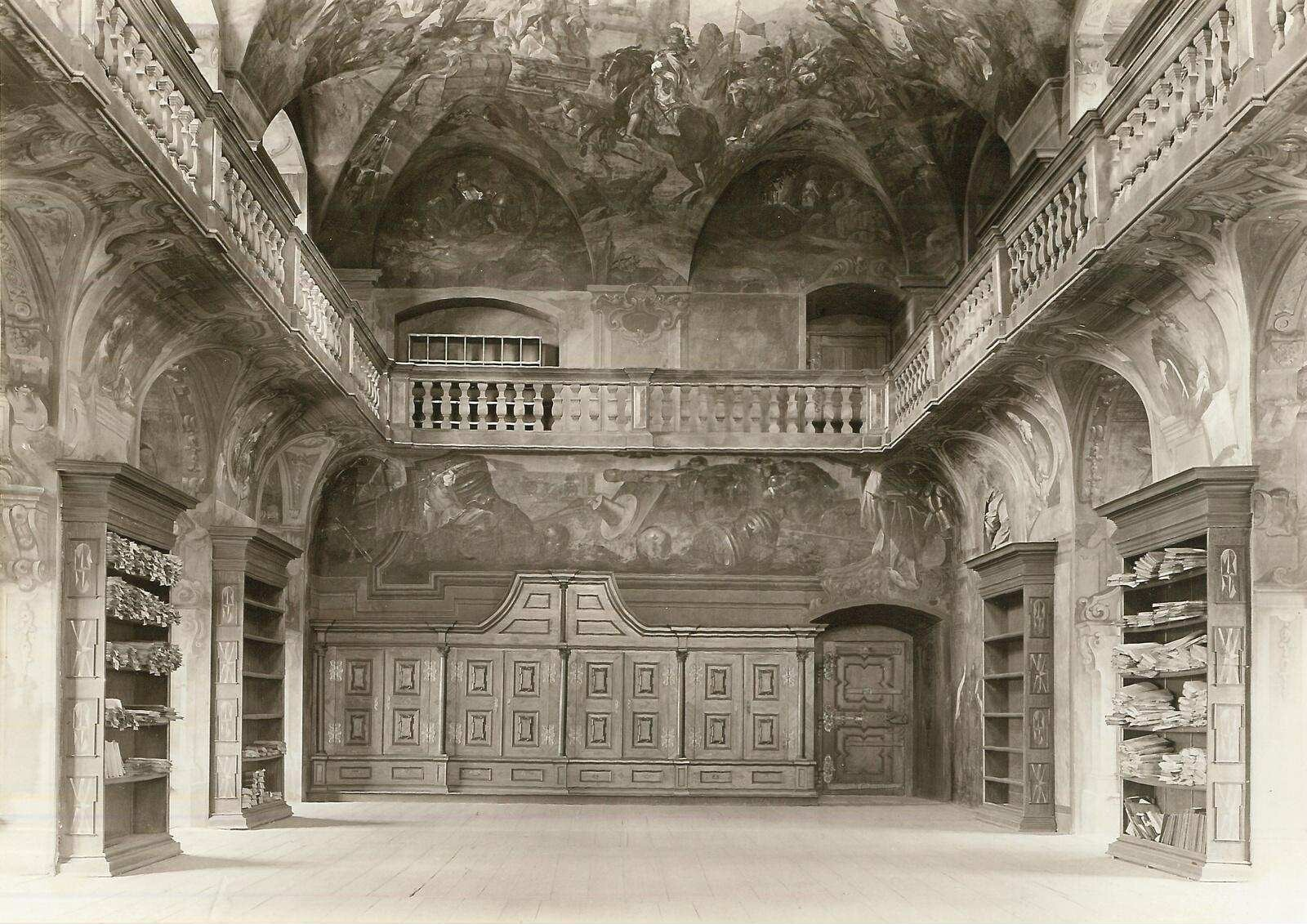
The library in the 1938

==== Library ====
The abbey library is located above the refectory in the Convent Wing. It occupies the second and third floors, with a ceiling height of 12 meters. A gallery separates the two stories and winds around the entire room. The library at Lubiąż is thought to be the largest baroque library in Silesia. Most of the abbey's collection was removed after its dissolution, and it was used for ceremonial purposes and theater performances during the convent's service as an asylum. The remaining bookshelves and cabinets which once furnished the room were destroyed in the aftermath of the Second World War. The frescoes in the library were painted in 1737 Philipp Bentum, and the room's vaulted ceilings were badly damaged in the years following the war. Gradual repairs and restorations were begun in 2006 and continue to this day; it is inaccessible to visitors.

=== Other buildings ===
==== Administrative and Agricultural buildings ====
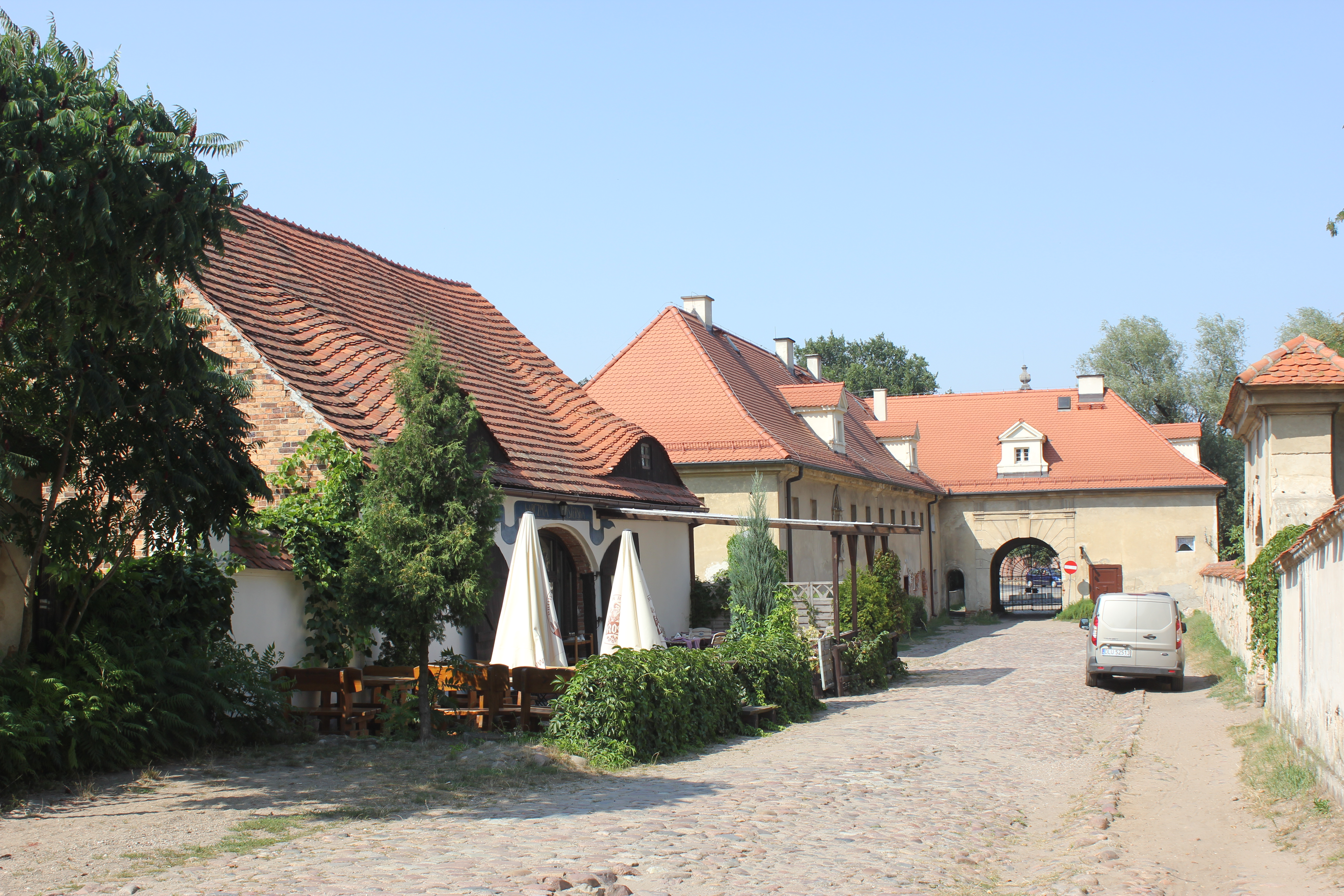
The barn and hospital-gatehouse

The northernmost building of the abbey complex, at the far end of a bridge crossing a small brook, is the gatehouse, which connects the abbey to the village of Lubiąż. The structure was originally built for defensive purposes during the Hussite War, and was renovated in 1601 in a late-Renaissance/early-Baroque style. Under the gable of the gate are statues of Benedict of Nursia and Bernard of Clairvaux. It is currently used as housing.

Attached to the south of the gatehouse is the Abbey Hospital. Next to the hospital is the one-story Abbey Barn, which now hosts a small inn, the Karczma Cysterska.

The nearby Abbey Chancellery and Abbey Vicar's house and further away Craftsman's Building all date to the same phase of construction in the early 18th century and are nearly identical in design, though built on different footprints. Their hipped roofs and dormers echo the design of the abbey building. The Chancellery is currently used as an administrative building by the Fundacja Lubiąż, while the Abbey Vicar's house is now subdivided into apartments, as was the Craftsman's Building until it burned down in 2021.

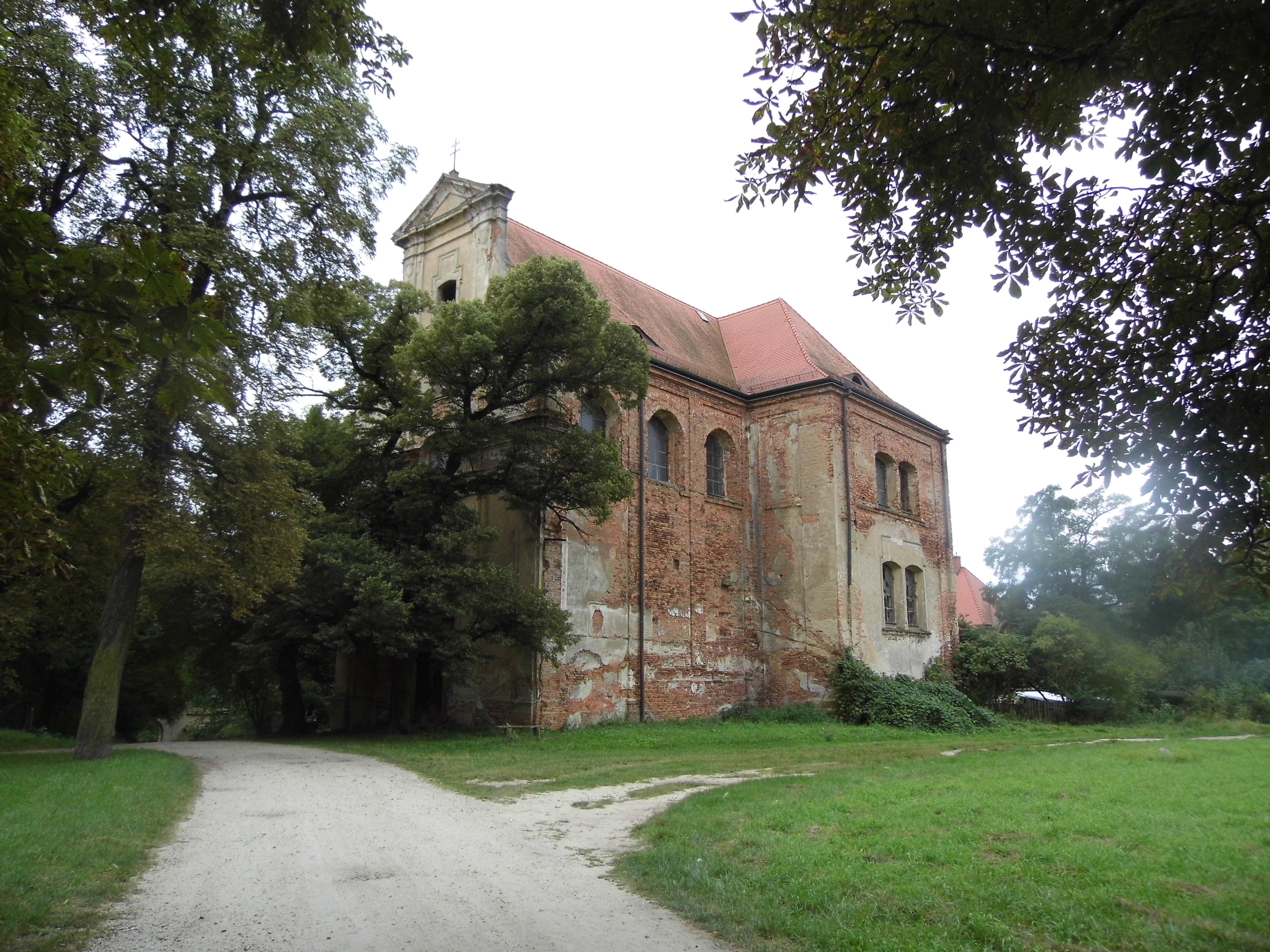
The Church of St. James

Between the Craftsman's Building and the abbey is the Brewery and Bakery, a large 18th-century two-story building with a mansard roof which was renovated in the 19th century. It is currently abandoned.

==== Church of St. James ====
The Church of St. James was first mentioned in 1202. It was originally built as a parish for the secular workers at the abbey and inhabitants of the village of Lubiąż. It is situated between the Craftsman's Building and the Brewery and Bakery. It was rebuilt in the 1690s, lending the church its current appearance. After the demise of the abbey, it was temporarily used as an arsenal, and was made the village's protestant parish church in 1836. Along with the rest of the abbey buildings, it was plundered after the end of the war and has since sat abandoned, with the exception of a new roof which was built in 1960. It is inaccessible to visitors.

== Gallery ==
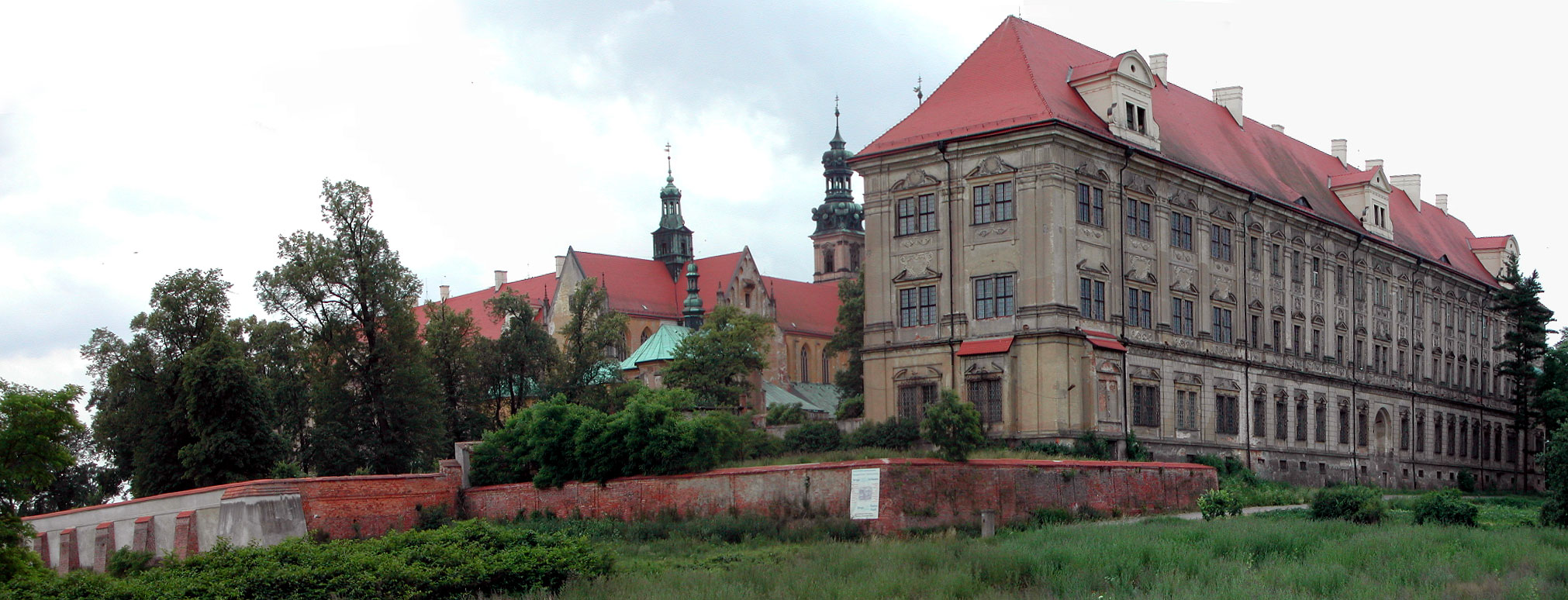
The Prelature seen from the north

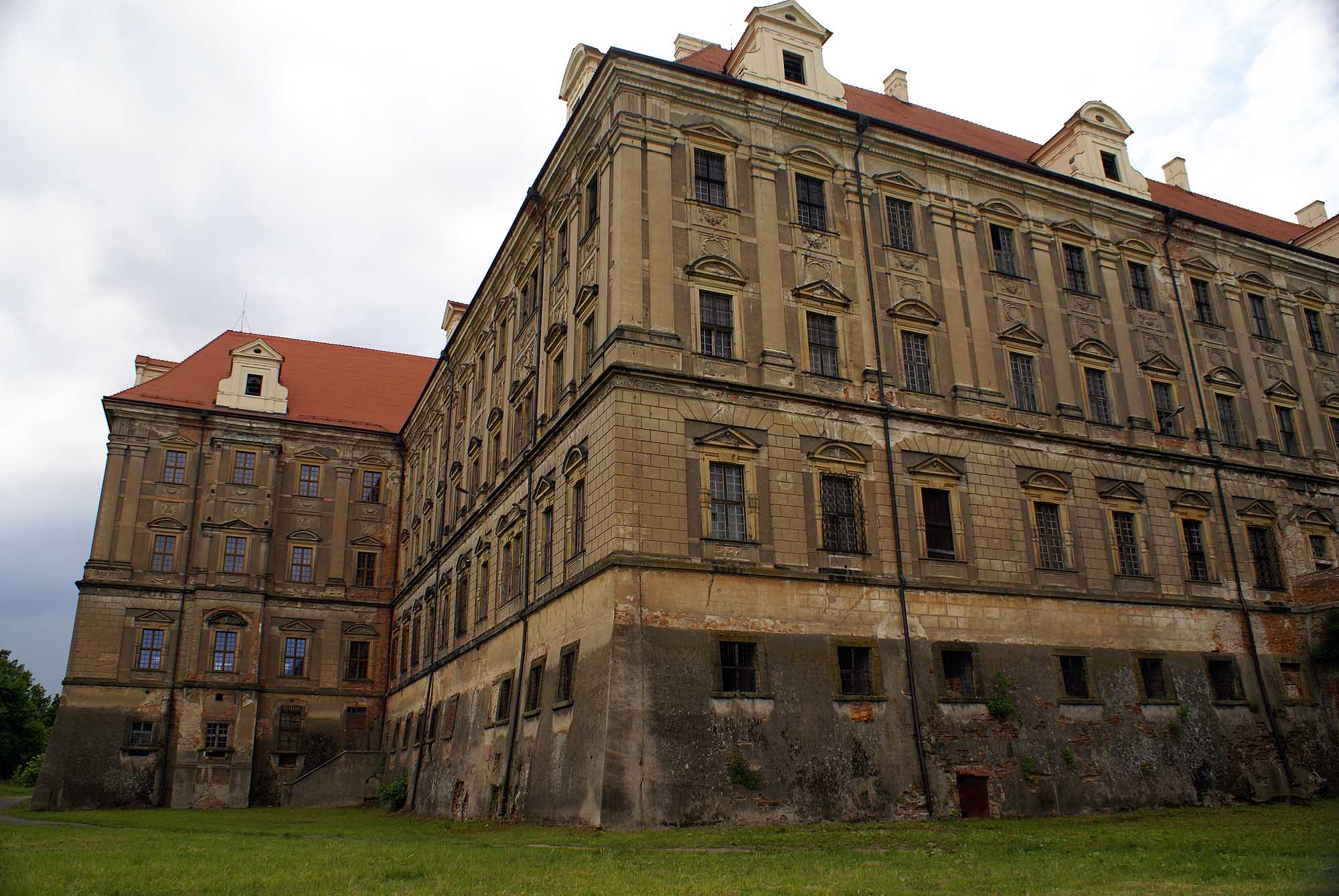
Facade of the Convent Wing

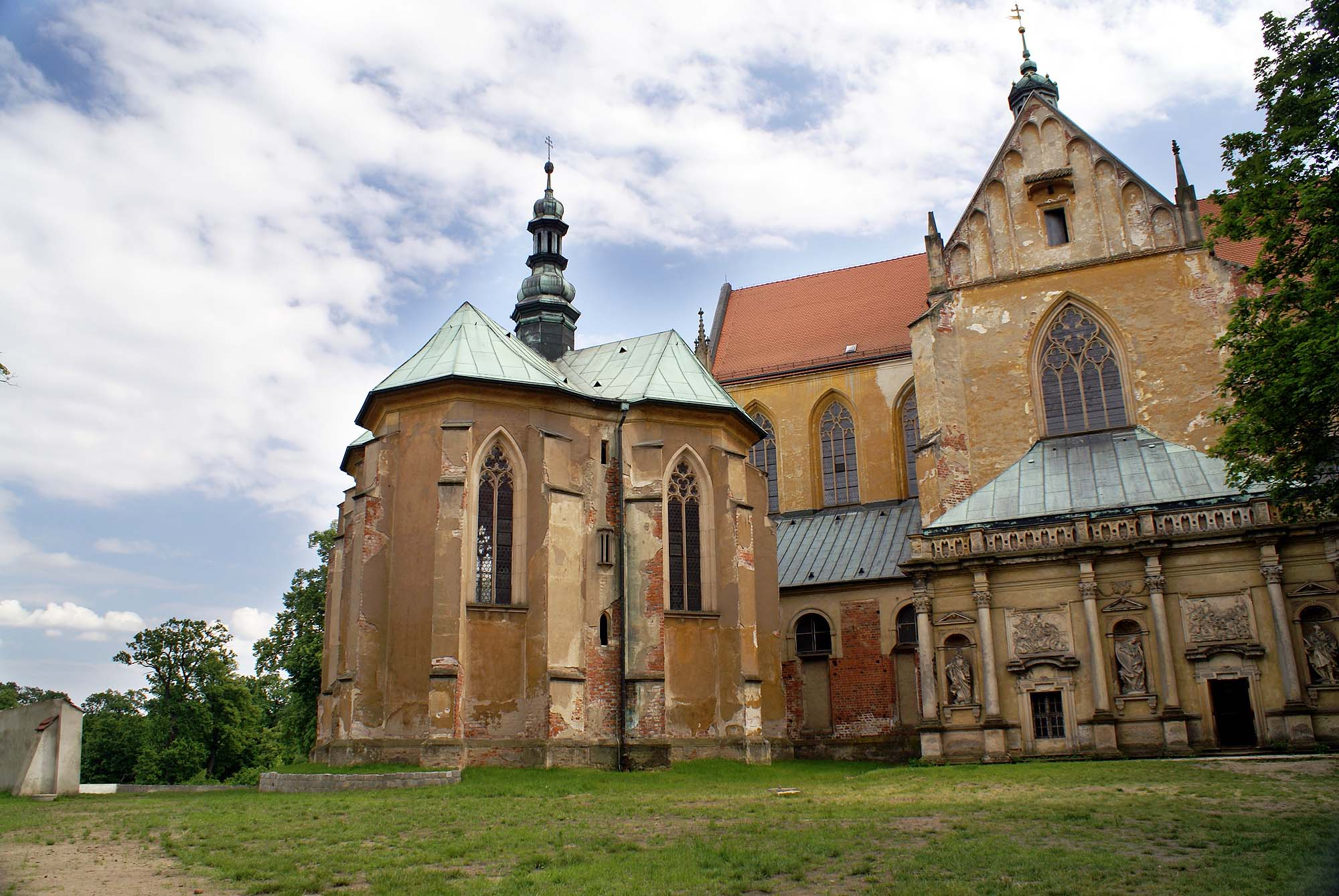
The north facade of the church, with the Prince's and Loreto chapels visible

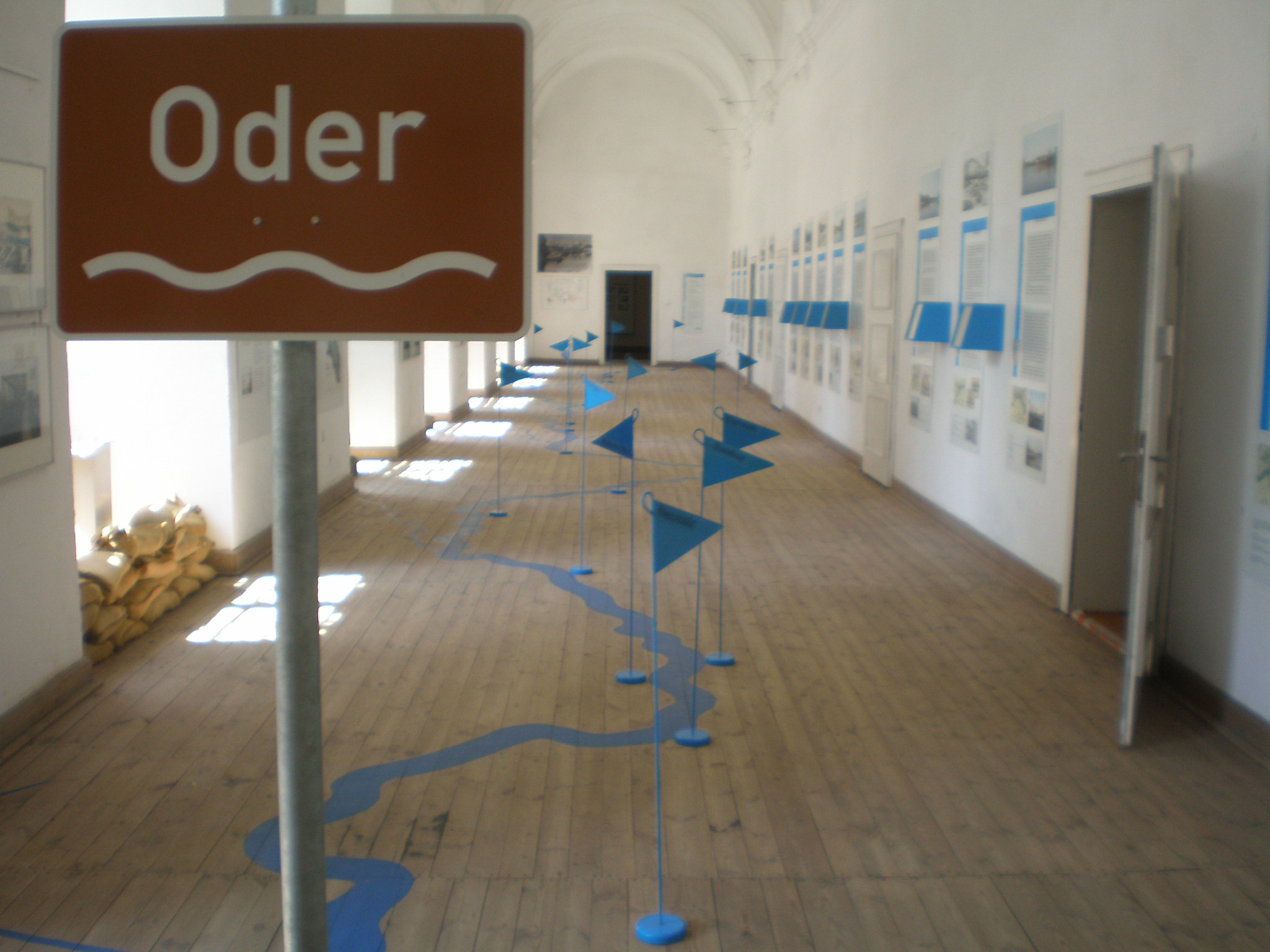
An exhibit in a hallway (2007)

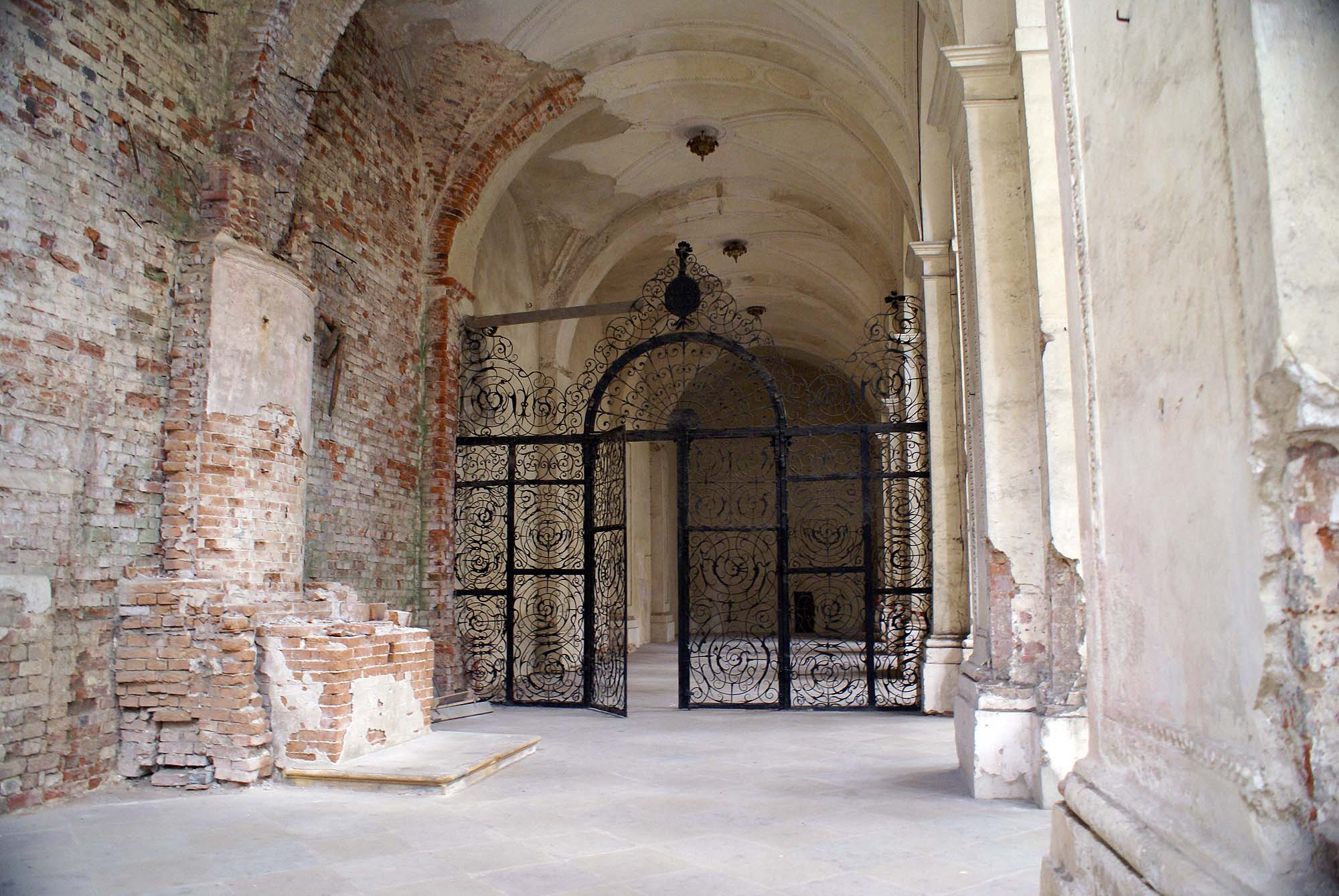
The choir grille in the northern ambulatory

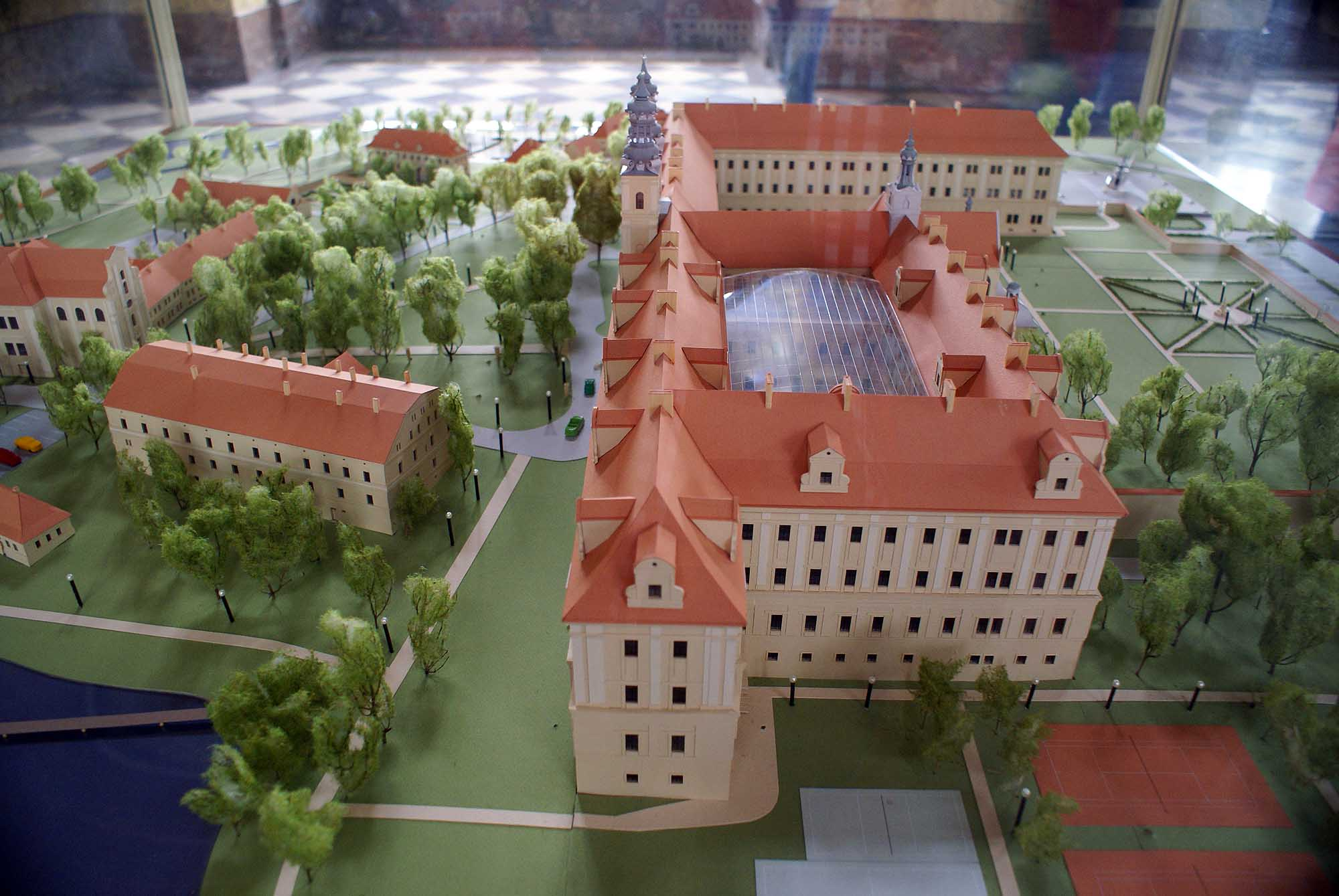
A model of the restored abbey made by the Lubiąż Foundation

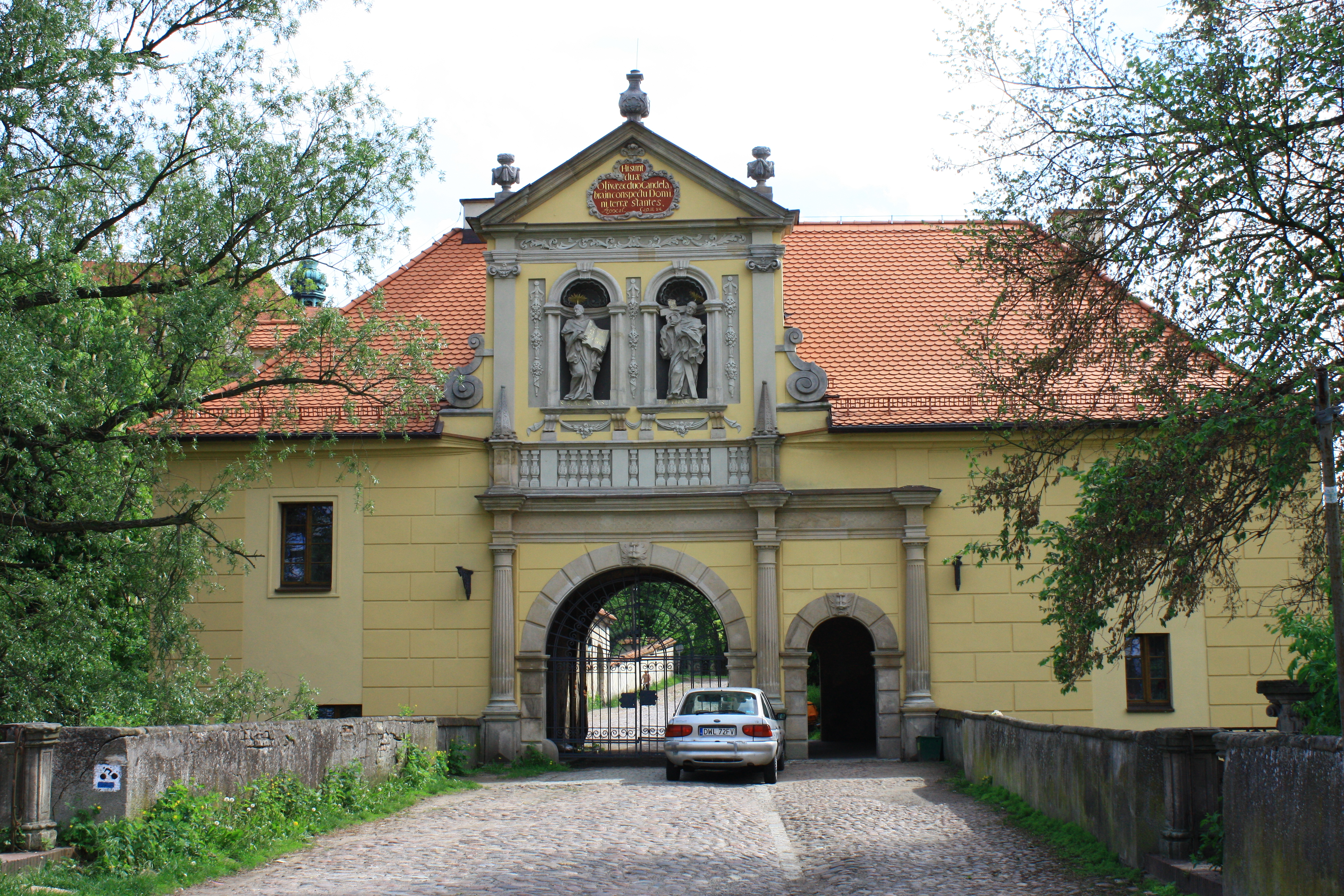
The restored gatehouse

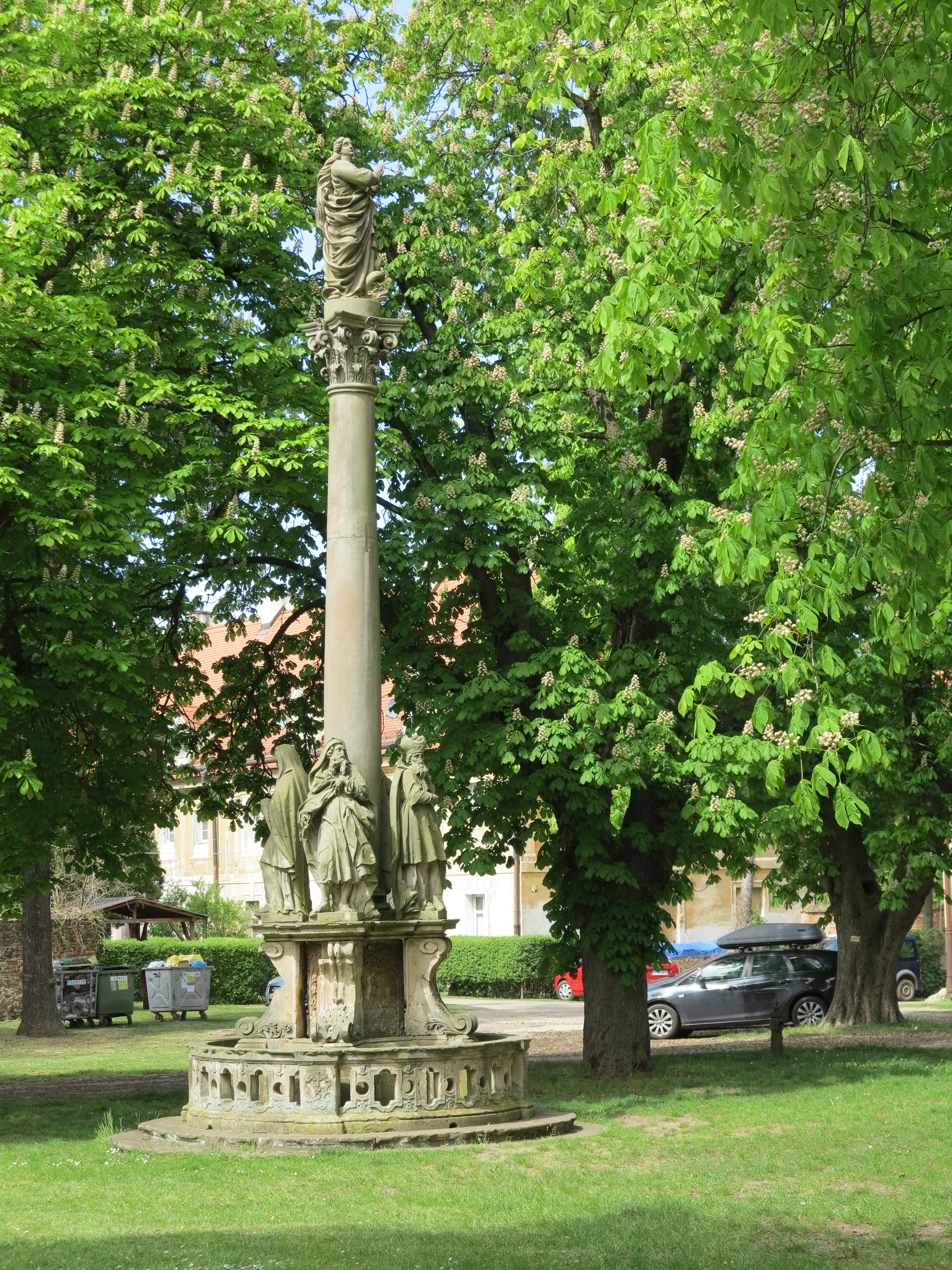
Baroque Marian column in front of the main facade depicting the Coronation of Mary

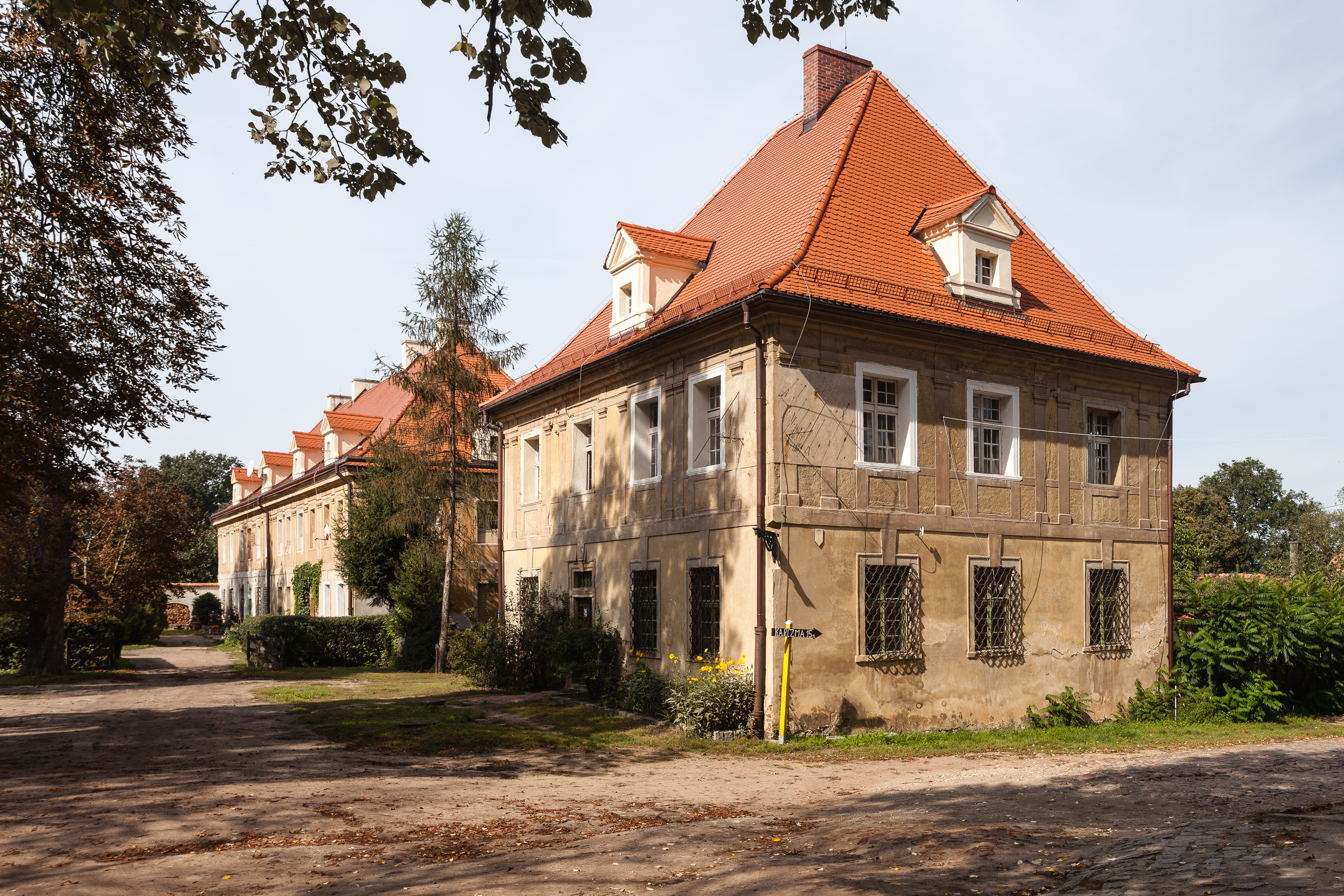
The Chancellery and Vicar's House

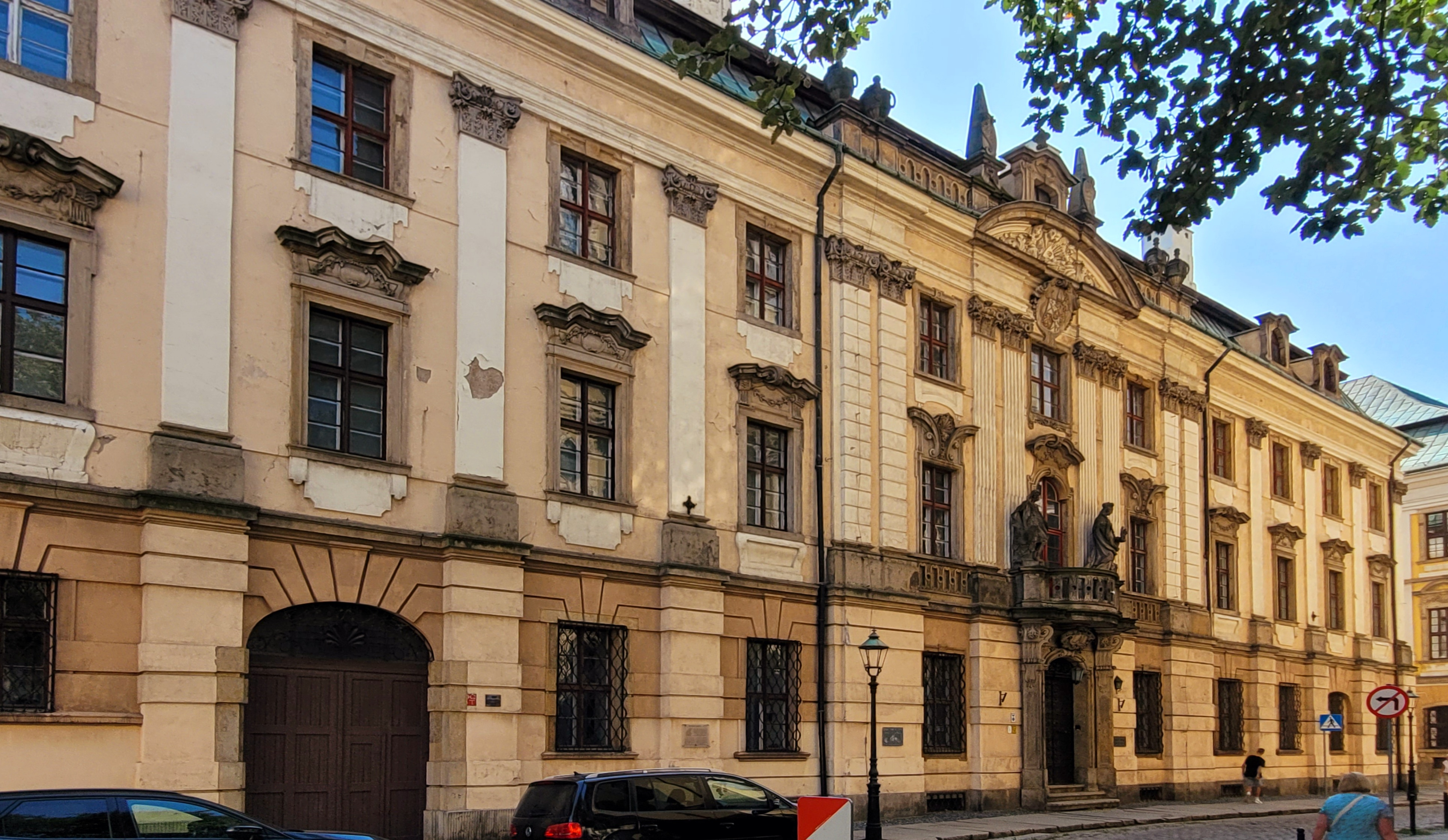
The Abbot's Palace in Legnica, built for the abbots of Lubiąż in 1728
