= Foundation for German-Polish Cooperation =

Financial organization

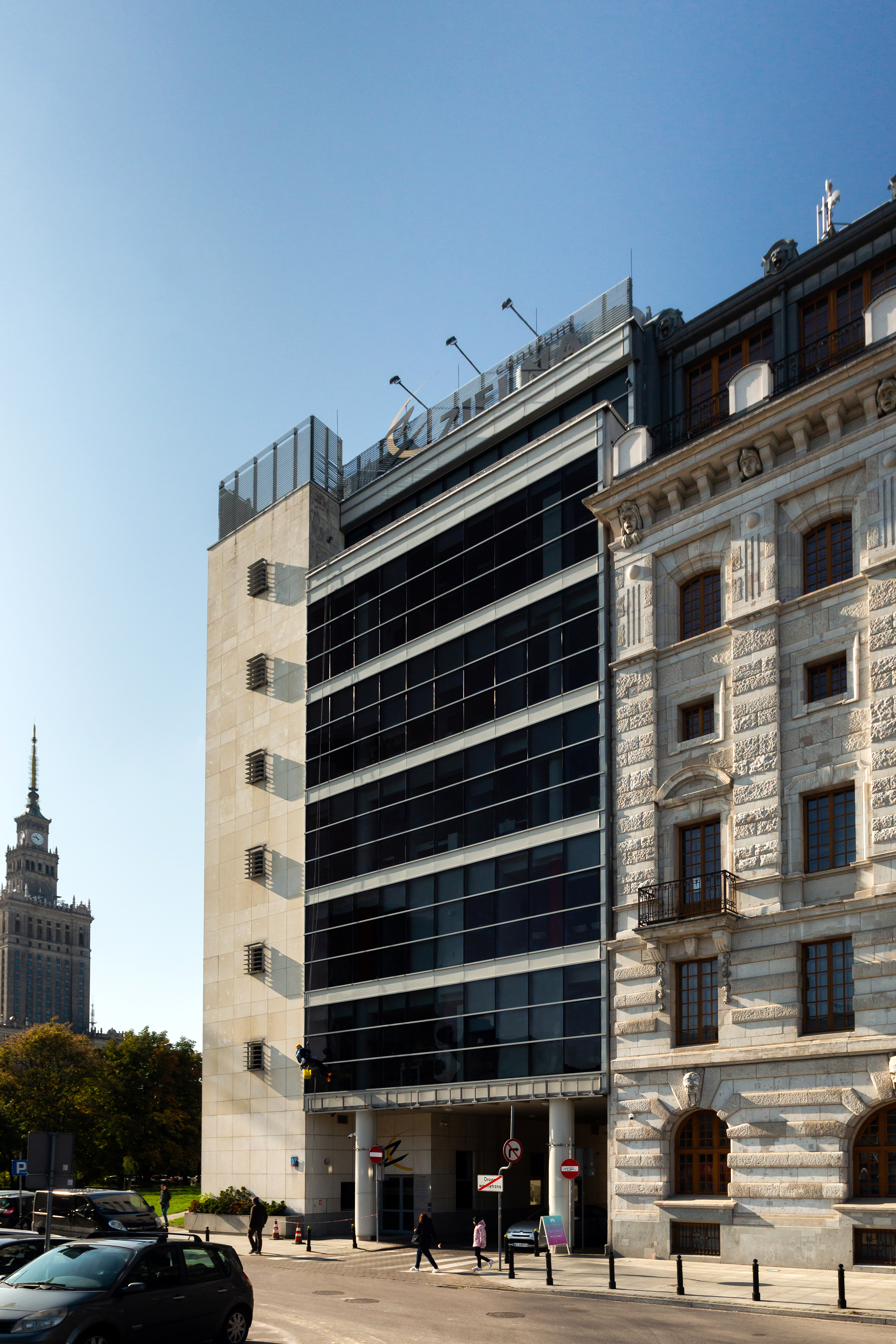
Main seat of the Foundation for German-Polish Cooperation in Warsaw.

The Foundation for German-Polish Cooperation (Polish: Fundacja Współpracy Polsko-Niemieckiej, German: Stiftung für deutsch-polnische Zusammenarbeit), an organization established 1991 by the governments of the Republic of Poland and the Federal Republic of Germany, provides financial support for initiatives that bring Poles and Germans together.

1991-2021 it has subsidised 16 thousand bilateral projects in both countries as well as Polish-German projects in third countries. The total amount of grants awarded since 1991 equals PLN 1 Billion 345 Mil. [EUR 313 Million].

The bilateral Board of the Foundation is nominated by the Prime Minister of the Republic of Poland and the Chancellor of the Federal Republic of Germany.

In the early years, the Foundation mainly awarded means for installation of modern infrastructure in Poland. The Foundation supports valuable Polish-German cooperation, in particular partnerships between Polish and German institutions, educational projects that promote knowledge of Poland and Germany, scientific cooperation, and artistic and literary projects.

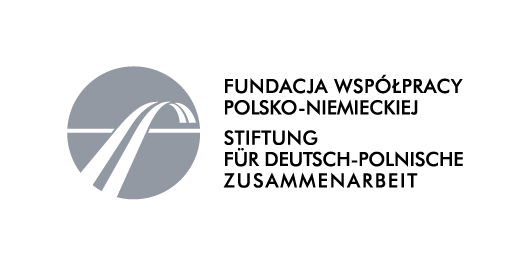
Logo of the Foundation for German-Polish Cooperation.

Apart from its grant-awarding activity, the Foundation also implements its own projects, initiated in cooperation with organisations and institutions from both countries.

The history of projects by the Foundation over the past 30 years is presented under the hashtag #30latFWPN #30JahreSdpZ in the social media (Facebook, Vimeo, YouTube).

The main seat of the Foundation is located in Warsaw, Zielna St. 37. The Foundation operates a branch office in Berlin (Germany).
