= Sulkovian dialect =

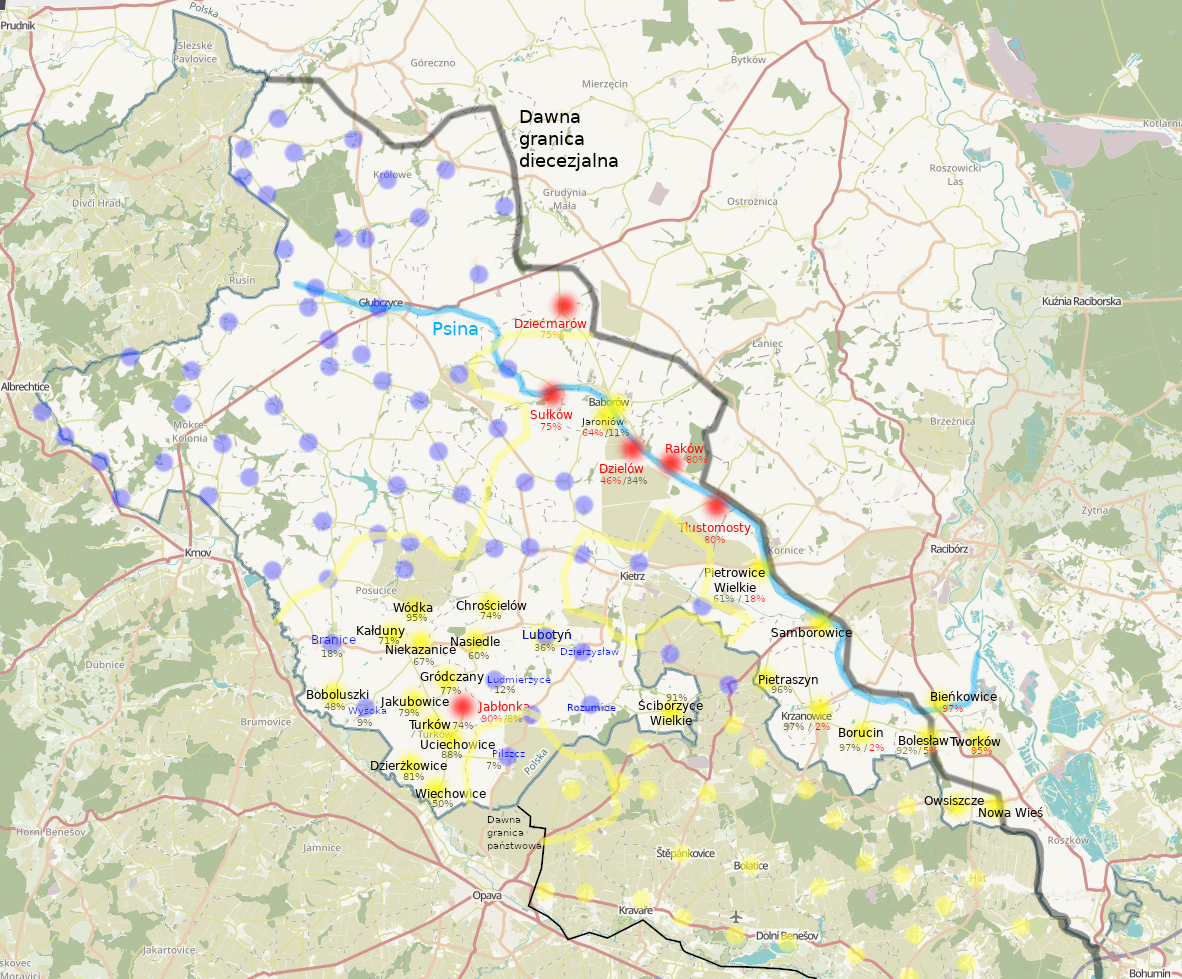
Red - Sulkovian speaking villages

The Sulkovian dialect (Silesian: sułkowski djalekt; Polish: dialekt sułkowski) is one of the Silesian dialects, extracted by Feliks Steuer in his work Dialekt sułkowski (1934). It is a part of the Silesian-Lach border dialects; its name derives from Steuer's native village Sułków.

The works Ostatni gwojźdźaurz and Z naszej źymjy ślůnskej were written in this dialect.

The characteristic features of Sulkovian phonology are:

- the evolution of former long a into au, pronounced [aw];
- keeping of hard k and g in the combinations ky and gy, e.g. okynka (windows), pługy (ploughs);
- so-called "anticipation of softness" - adding the consonant j, e.g. kujźńa (smithy);
- the evolution of nasal vowel at the end of a word into am, e.g. cebulam (onion, the accusative case).

== Example ==
Gwojźdźaurz mau wjelkům familijam. Ćynżko mu je wszyckich ućůngnuć. Ale robi dźyń i noc, ażby dźeći mjały co jejść, co se oblyc i czim zostać. We wszyckim půmaugau mu baba. To je dobrau baba. Kaj chłop być ńy może, tam je ůna. W leće stauwau rano o jednej a leći na trauwam. Tam daleko za huczńicam. Jak przychodźi du dům, warzi na blasze. Dauwau świńům, gańśům, kurům a odbywau krowy. Po śńaudańu idźe na poly. Krůtko przed połejdńym zajś je důma. Mujśi warzyć objaud a gotować lau bydła.

— Feliks Steuer, Ostatńi gwojźdźaurz
