= Silesian dialect =

Silesian dialect may refer to:

- Silesian, or Upper Silesian, a West Slavic Language
- Silesian German, or Lower Silesian, a nearly extinct dialect of East Central German
- Lach dialects, or Silesian Czech
