= List of Silesian-language films =

The following is a list of Silesian-language films. After World War II quite a number of feature films was shot in Silesian or with an extensive use of Silesian, alongside dialogs in Polish, German and Czech. The vast majority of such films were produced in Poland, and some in Czechoslovakia and the Czech Republic.

== List ==
=== 1969 ===
- Salt of the Black Earth by Kazimierz Kutz

=== 1971 ===
- Pearl in the Crown by Kazimierz Kutz

=== 1979 ===
- Paciorki jednego różańca [The Beads of One Rosary] by Kazimierz Kutz

=== 1980 ===
- Grzeszny żywot Franciszka Buły [The Sinful Life of Franciszek Bula] by Janusz Kidawa

=== 1983 ===
- Na straży swej stać będę [I shall Always Stand Guard] by Kazimierz Kutz

=== 1984 ===
- Trzy stopy nad ziemią [Three Feet Above the Ground] by Jan Kidawa-Błoński

=== 1986 ===
- Komedianci z wczorajszej ulicy [Pretenders from Yesterday's Street] by Janusz Kidawa

=== 1987 ===
- Sławna jak Sarajewo [Famous Like Sarajevo] by Janusz Kidawa

=== 1992 ===
- Pamiętnik znaleziony w garbie [Diary in a Marble / Memoirs Found in a Hunched Back] by Jan Kidawa-Błoński

=== 1993 ===
- Gorący czwartek by Michał Rosa

=== 1994 ===
- Reverted by Kazimierz Kutz
- Śmierć jak kromka chleba [Death as a Slice of Bread] by Kazimierz Kutz
- Stanika Cyronia droga do nieba by Wojciech Sarnowicz
- Wesoło czyli smutno. Kazimierza Kutza rozmowy o Górnym Śląsku (TV series: interviews, 22 parts, 1994–1997) by Kazimierz Kutz

=== 1995 ===
- ...i twoja mowa cię zdradza by Wojciech Sarnowicz

=== 1999 ===
- Końca wojny nie było by Wojciech Sarnowicz
- Posłuchajcie przypowieści o życiu szczęśliwym by Wojciech Sarnowicz
- Święta wojna (TV series: comedy, 322 parts, 1999–2008) by Marek Bielecki and Dariusz Goczał

=== 2001 ===
- Angelus by Lech Majewski

=== 2005 ===
- Barbórka by pl:Maciej Pieprzyca
- Destined for Blues by Jan Kidawa-Błoński

=== 2007 ===
- Benek by Robert Gliński

=== 2009 ===
- Zgorszenia publiczne by Maciej Prykowski

=== 2010 ===
- Ewa by Adam Sikora and Ingmar Villqist

=== 2016 ===
- Szczęście świata by Michał Rosa

=== 2017 ===
- Gwiazdy [Stars] by Jan Kidawa-Błoński
- Zgoda [The Reconciliation] by Maciej Sobieszczański

== See also ==
- Silesian language
- Silesian German
- Texas Silesian
