= Silesian language =

West Slavic ethnolect

Silesian
- Upper Silesian
- ślōnskŏ gŏdka ślůnsko godka
- Pronunciation: [ˈɕlɔ̝nskɔ ˈɡɔtka]
- Native to: Poland (Silesian Voivodeship, Opole Voivodeship); Czech Republic (Moravia–Silesia, Jeseník)
- Region: Silesia
- Ethnicity: Silesians
- Native speakers: 457,900 (2021 census)
- Language family: Indo-European: Balto-Slavic; Slavic; West Slavic; Lechitic; Polish; Silesian
- Dialects: Cieszyn (less than 1% of Cieszyn speakers consider it part of Silesian language, the rest Polish); Sulkovian; Gliwice; Prudnik; Niemodlin; Opole; Texan; Sycow
- Writing system: Latin (Steuer's alphabet and ślabikŏrzowy szrajbōnek)

Language codes
- ISO 639-3: szl
- Glottolog: sile1253
- ELP: Upper Silesian
- Linguasphere: 53-AAA-cck, 53-AAA-dam

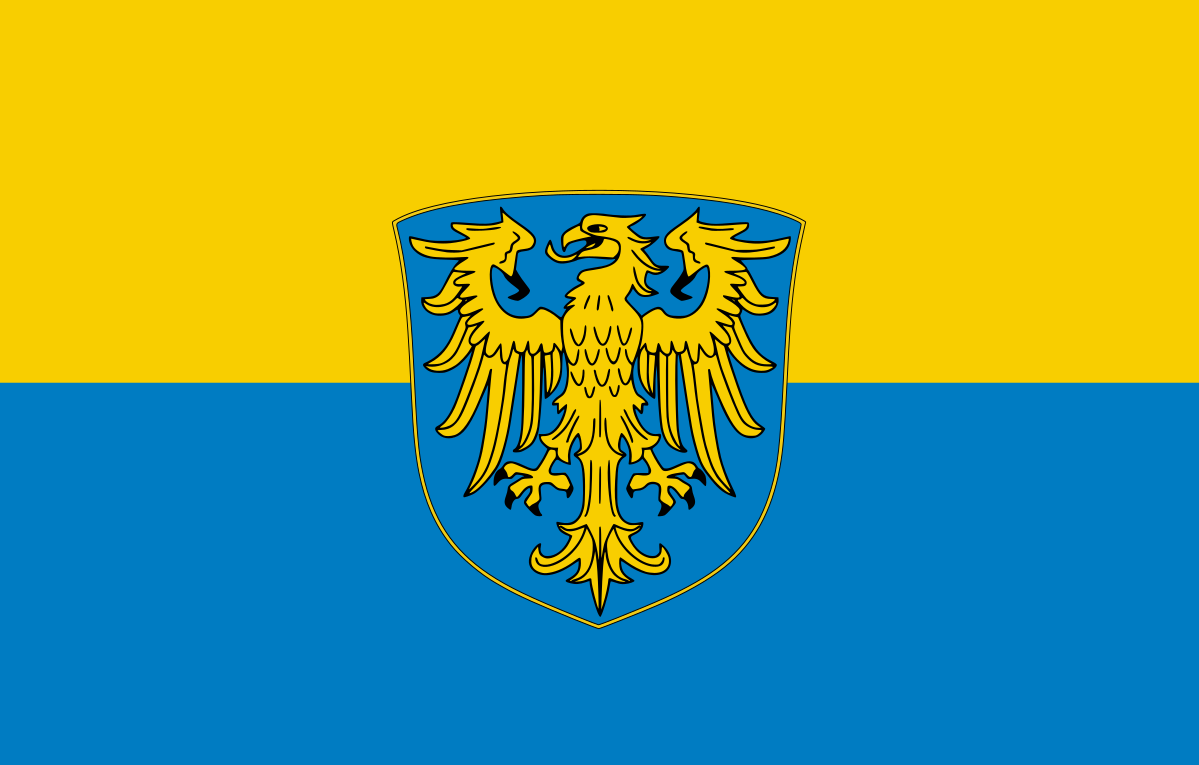
Flag of Upper Silesia

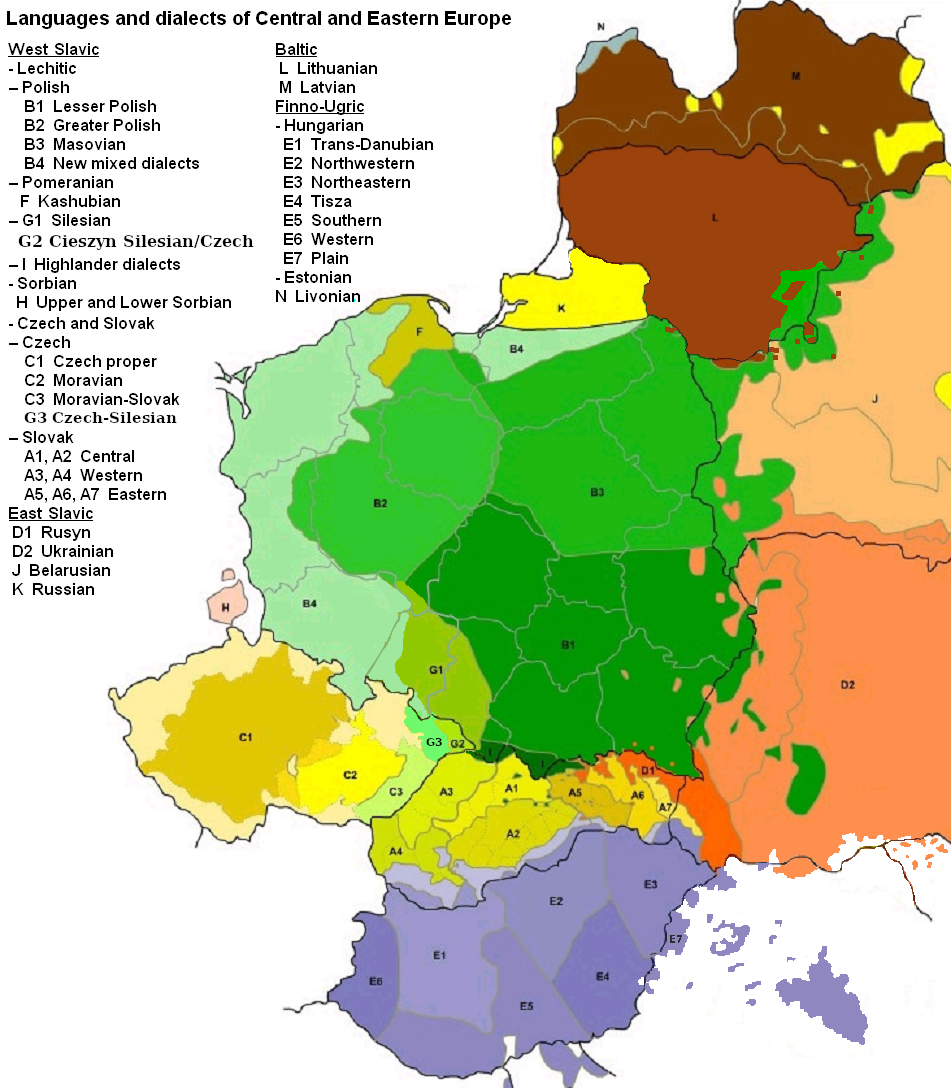
Range of Silesian on a map of East-Central Europe (marked as G1 and G2, in southern Poland and the eastern Czech Republic).

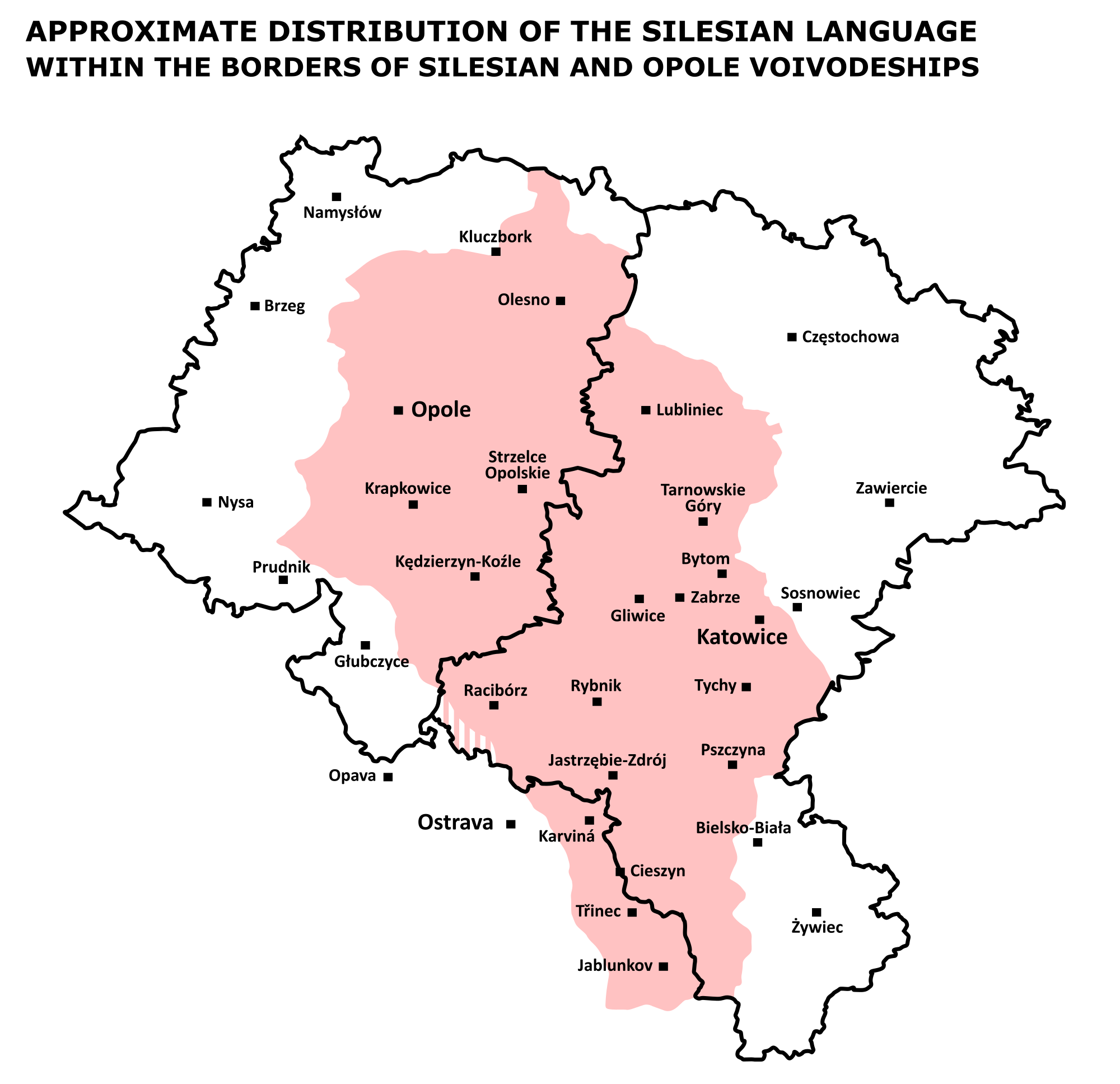
Distribution area of the Silesian language

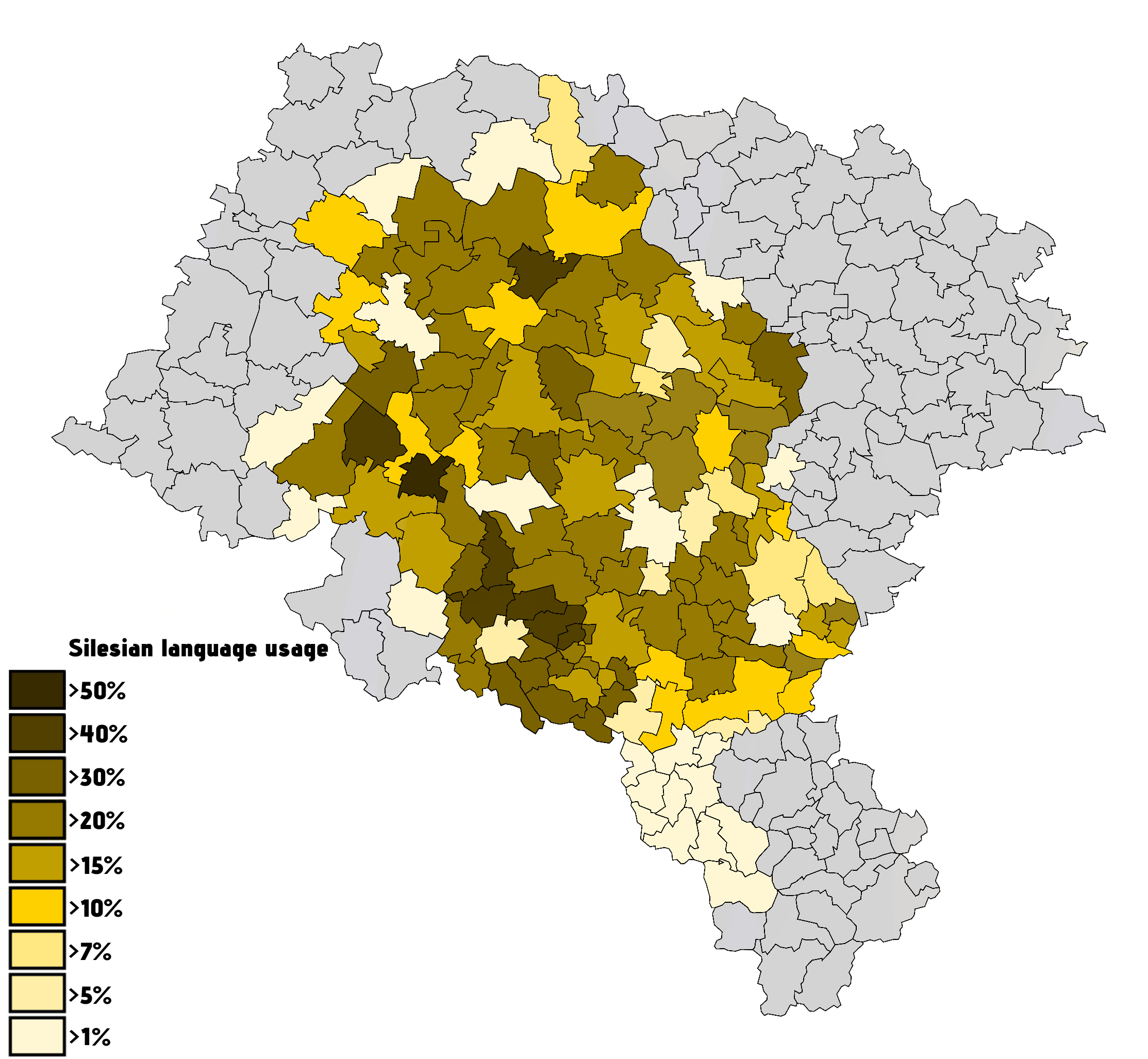
% of population in Opole and Silesian Voivodeships using Silesian on daily basis according to 2021 Polish census

A Silesian speaker, recorded in Poland

Silesian, (Note: Silesian: ślůnsko godka (Steuer's alphabet), ślōnskŏ gŏdka (Ślabikŏrzowy szrajbōnek), [ˈɕlonskɔ ˈɡɔtka]; Czech: slezština; Polish: język śląski, śląszczyzna; German: Schlesisch, Schlonsakisch) occasionally called Upper Silesian, is an ethnolect of the Lechitic group spoken in Upper Silesia. While having secured some international recognition as a language, there is a debate on whether Silesian is either a dialect of Polish or a distinct language, and if Silesians are either a regional ethnic group within the Polish nation or a distinct ethnic minority that historically emerged, but later diverged from, the Polish people. Some Silesians identify as a regional ethnic group within the Polish nation, while others view themselves as a distinct ethnic minority. Its vocabulary was significantly influenced by Central German due to the existence of numerous Silesian German speakers in the area prior to World War II and after. The first mentions of Silesian as a distinct lect date back to the 16th century, and the first literature with Silesian characteristics to the 17th century.

Linguistic distinctiveness of Silesian has long been a topic of discussion among Poland's linguists, especially after all of Upper Silesia was included within the Polish borders following World War II. Some regard it as one of the four major dialects of Polish, while others classify it as a separate regional language, distinct from Polish. The dispute over the status of Silesian is considered to be of purely political character. According to the official data from the 2021 Polish census, 467 145 people use Silesian on daily basis. Referring to Silesian as an ethnolect (which could be either a dialect or a language) has been recommended as a neutral term. Internationally, Silesian has been fully recognized as a language since 2007, when it was accorded the ISO 639-3 registration code szl.

Several efforts have been made for Silesian to gain recognition as an official regional language in Poland. Shortly before the 2007 election, the MPs of Samoobrona, LPR, RLN and PSL submitted a bill recognizing Silesian as a regional language in Poland, but the Sejm was dissolved before it could have been passed. Subsequent stillborn attempts were made in 2010 and 2012. In 2011, the ECRML recommended that Poland recognizes Silesian as a language. In 2014, a citizens' bill signed by 140,000 citizens was submitted to the Sejm, but was rejected; similar bills were voted down in 2018 and 2020. In 2023, another bill was prepared but was not voted upon because the Sejm's term ended and the election was called. In April 2024, the Sejm took a significant step by passing a bill recognizing Silesian as a regional language, but the bill was vetoed by President Andrzej Duda on 29 May 2024. In January 2026, the Sejm again once passed the bill recognizing it as such, but it was vetoed by President Karol Nawrocki on 12 February 2026.

== Distribution ==
Silesian speakers currently live in the region of Upper Silesia, which is split between southwestern Poland and the northeastern Czech Republic. At present Silesian is commonly spoken in the area between the historical border of Silesia on the east and a line from Syców to Prudnik on the west as well as in the Rawicz area.

Until 1945, Silesian was also spoken in enclaves in Lower Silesia, where the majority spoke Lower Silesian, a variety of Central German. The German-speaking population was either evacuated en masse by German forces towards the end of the war or deported by the new administration upon the Polish annexation of the Silesian Recovered Territories after its end. Before World War II, most Slavic-language speakers also knew German and, at least in eastern Upper Silesia, many German speakers were acquainted with Slavic Silesian.

According to the last official census in Poland in 2021, about 460,000 people declared Silesian as their native language, whereas in the country's census of 2011, the figure was about 510,000. In the censuses in Poland, the Czech Republic, and Slovakia, nearly 527,000 people declared Silesian nationality; Upper Silesia has almost five million inhabitants, with the vast majority speaking Polish in the Polish part and declaring themselves to be Poles and the vast majority speaking Czech in the Czech part and declaring themselves to be Czechs.

== Grammar ==
Although the morphological differences between Silesian and Polish have been researched extensively, other grammatical differences have not been studied in depth.

A notable difference is in question-forming. In standard Polish, questions which do not contain interrogative words are formed either by using intonation or the interrogative particle czy. In Silesian, questions which do not contain interrogative words are formed by using intonation (with a markedly different intonation pattern than in Polish) or inversion (e.g. Je to na karcie?); there is no interrogative particle.

== Example ==
Silesian – Central dialect	Silesian – Cieszyn dialect	Polish	Czech	Slovak	English
Hned żech poznoł lepij ôd niego kwiotek. Na planecie ôd małego princa kwiotki dycki były proste. Miały ino jedno kōłko płatkōw, niy brały nic placu i żodnego niy szterowały. Rano sie ukazowały w trowie, a na wieczōr pōmału sie traciyły. Ale jedyn dziyń nowy kwiotek sie pokozoł ze ziorka prziwiōnego niy wiadōmo skōnd. A mały princ patrzoł pozornie na flancka, co niy wyglōndała jak żodno inkszo na jego planecie. Wiycie, to mogła być nowo zorta baobaba.	Hned żech lepszy poznoł tyn kwiotek. Na planecie Małego Ksiyncio kwiotki dycki były fest ajnfachowe, miały jednóm koróne płatków, nie zabiyrały moc placu a żodnymu nie zawadzały. Kieregosi rana zaczły rosnónć miyndzy trowami a wieczór wiyndły. Krzok róże wzeszeł przes dziyń ze zorka kiere prziniós gdosi skónsikej a Mały Ksiónże sie fórt dziwoł na tóm maczyzne, kiero nie była podobno do inkszych. Móg to być nowy gatunek baobabu.	Szybko dowiedziałem się więcej o tym kwiatku. Na planecie Małego Księcia zawsze były całkiem zwyczajne kwiaty, ozdobione jednym tylko rzędem płatków, które nie zabierały wiele miejsca i nikomu nie przeszkadzały. Pewnego ranka pojawiały się w trawie, a wieczorem umierały. Ale ten wykiełkował kiedyś z nasionka przyniesionego nie wiadomo skąd, a Mały Książę bardzo uważnie czuwał nad tą łodyżką niepodobną do innych łodyżek. To mógł być nowy gatunek baobabu.	Květinu malého prince jsem poznal velice brzy lépe. Na jeho planetě rostly úplně prosté květiny, ozdobené jedinou řadou okvětních plátků. Nezabíraly místo a nikoho narušily. Jednoho rána se vždy objevily v trávě a potom večer uvadaly. Ale tahle květina vyklíčila jeden den ze semene přivátého bůhvíodkud a malý princ bděl velmi pozorně nad tímto výhonkem, který se nepodobal jiným prouktům. Mohl to být nějaký nový druh baobabu.	Čoskoro som tú kvetinu poznal lepšie. Na planéte Malého princa rástli odjakživa jednoduché kvetiny, ozdobené iba jediným radom korunných lupienkov, ktoré zaberali málo miesta a nikoho nerušili. Ráno sa zjavovali v tráve a večer vädli. Ale táto vyklíčila jedného dňa zo semienka, priviateho ktovie odkiaľ, a Malý princ starostlivo strážil výhonok, čo sa nepodobal na ostatné. Mohol to byť nový druh baobabu	I soon learned to know this flower better. On the little prince's planet the flowers had always been very simple. They had only one ring of petals; they took up no room at all; they were a trouble to nobody. One morning they would appear in the grass, and by night they would have faded peacefully away. But one day, from a seed blown from no one knew where, a new flower had come up; and the little prince had watched very closely over this small sprout which was not like any other small sprouts on his planet. It might, you see, have been a new kind of baobab.

== Dialects of Silesian ==
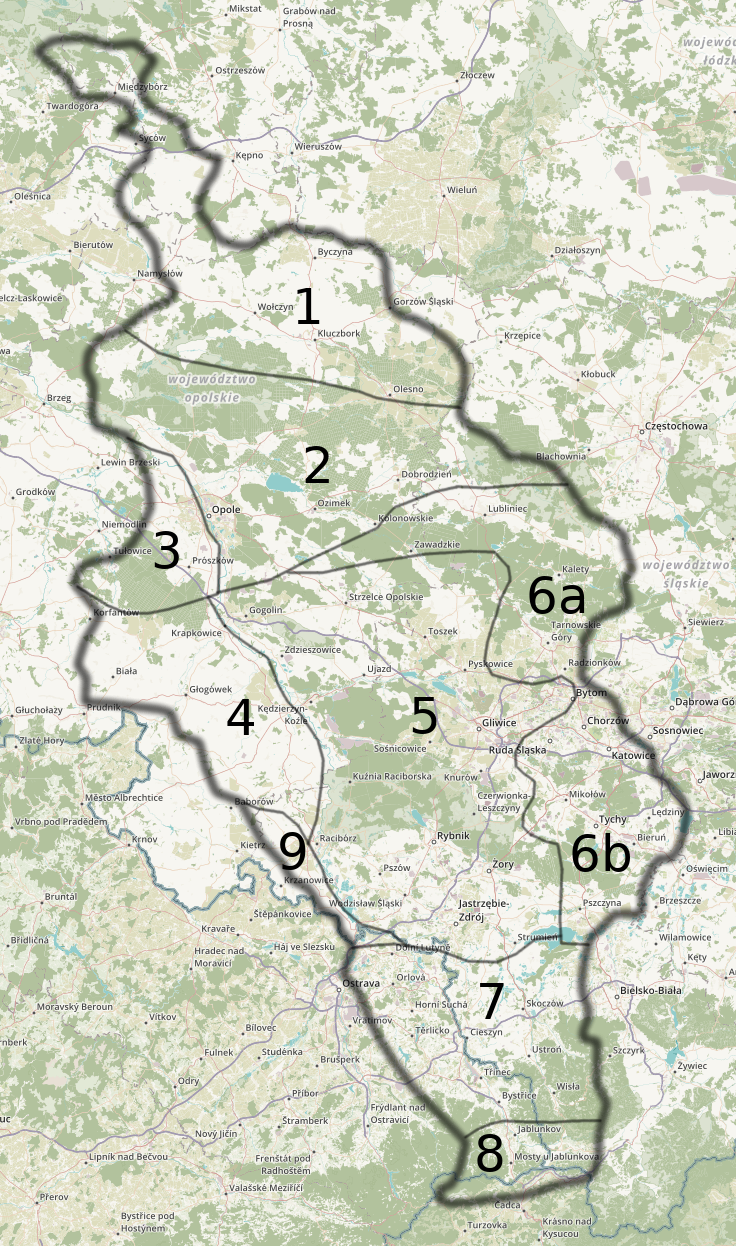
Map showing the distribution of the Silesian dialects

The Silesian language consists of a number of dialects, broadly classified into three groups; northern, central and southern. Per Alfred Zaręba, these dialects are further divided as follows:

- Northern dialects:
  - Kluczbork (1)
  - Opole (2)
  - Niemodlin (3)
- Central dialects:
  - Prudnik (4)
  - Gliwice (5)
  - Borderland Silesian-Lesser Polish dialects (6):
    - Gliwice-Opole-Lesser Poland Borderland (a)
    - Silesian-Lesser Polish Borderland (b)
- Southern dialects:
  - Cieszyn (7)
  - Jablunkov (8)
  - Borderland Silesian-Lach (9)

According to the 2021 census, majority of native speakers of the Cieszyn dialect don’t consider their speech a part of separate Silesian language, but rather Polish (less than 1% of Cieszyn Silesian speakers consider it part of Silesian language, the rest Polish), reflecting historical differences between former Prussian and Austrian Silesia, where Polish identity was historically strong, in 1848 Cieszyn Silesians expressed: "Considering that here we speak the Polish language and have Polish nationality, many voices among us already wish for our part of Silesia to be united with the Kraków governorate."

Historically, the dialectal distribution also included the Chwalim dialect, part of the Lower Silesian dialect group. This dialect formed the northernmost boundary of the Silesian language and influenced nearby new mixed dialects until its extinction in the 20th century.

== Dialect vs. language ==
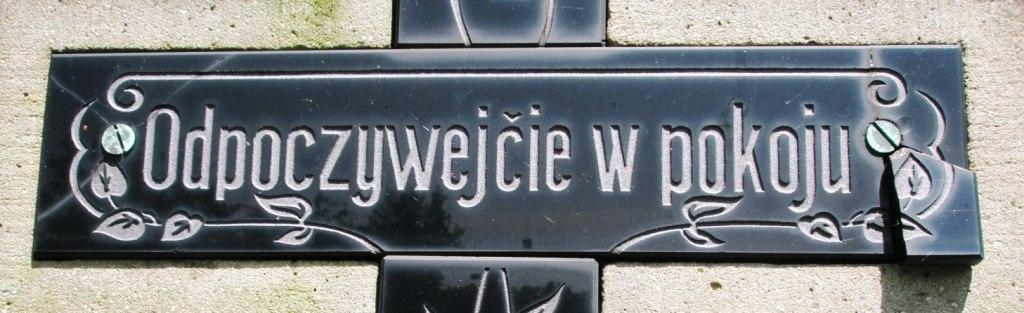
Grave inscription at a Lutheran cemetery in Střítež near Český Těšín. The inscription, which says "Rest in Peace", is in the Cieszyn Silesian dialect.

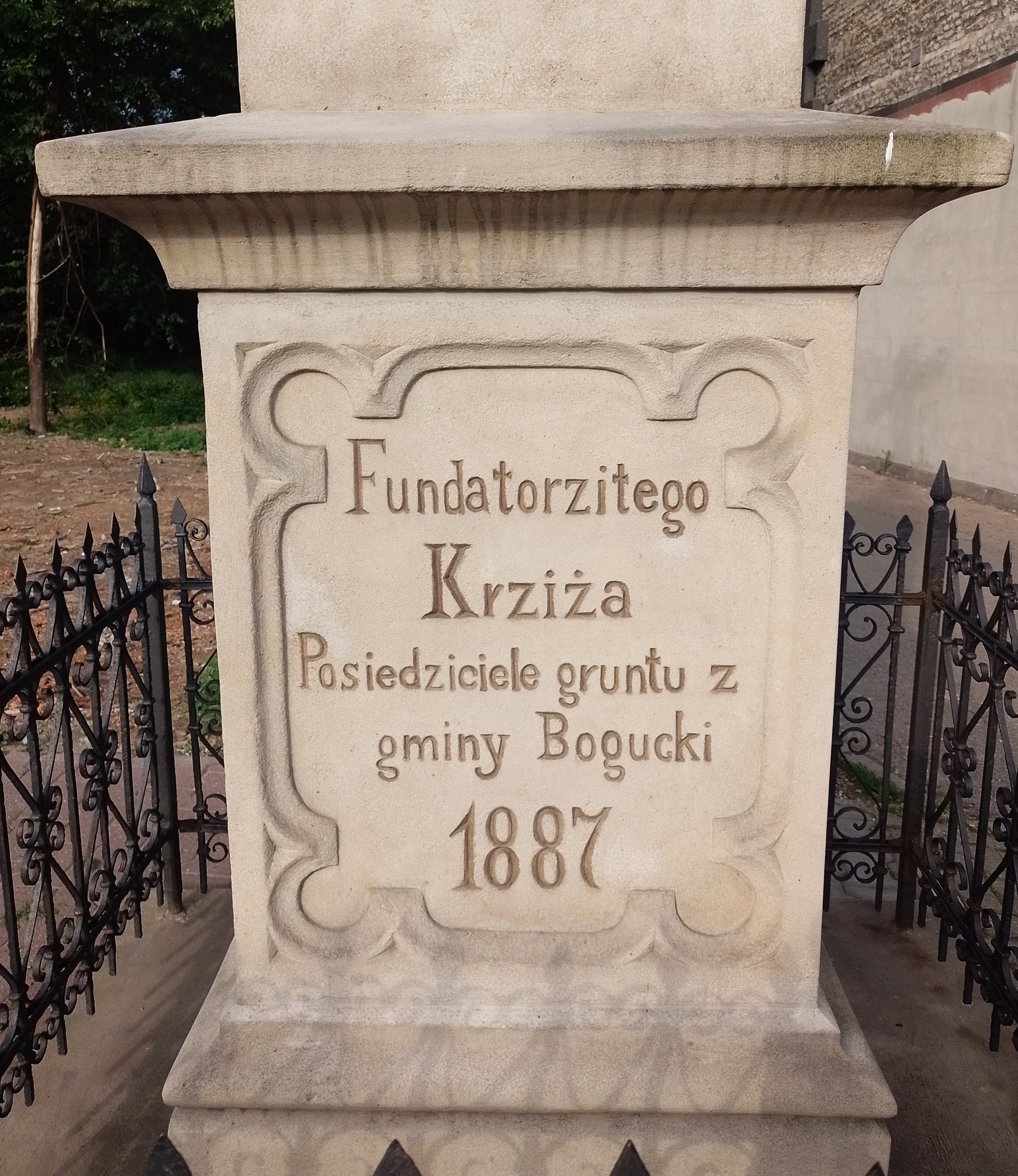
Inscription on a 19th-century wayside cross in Bogucice, a district of Katowice: "Founders of this cross, landowners from the municipality of Bogucice, 1887". In modern Standard Silesian it would be written as follows: Fundatorzi tego krziża / Posiedziciele grōntu z gminy boguckij

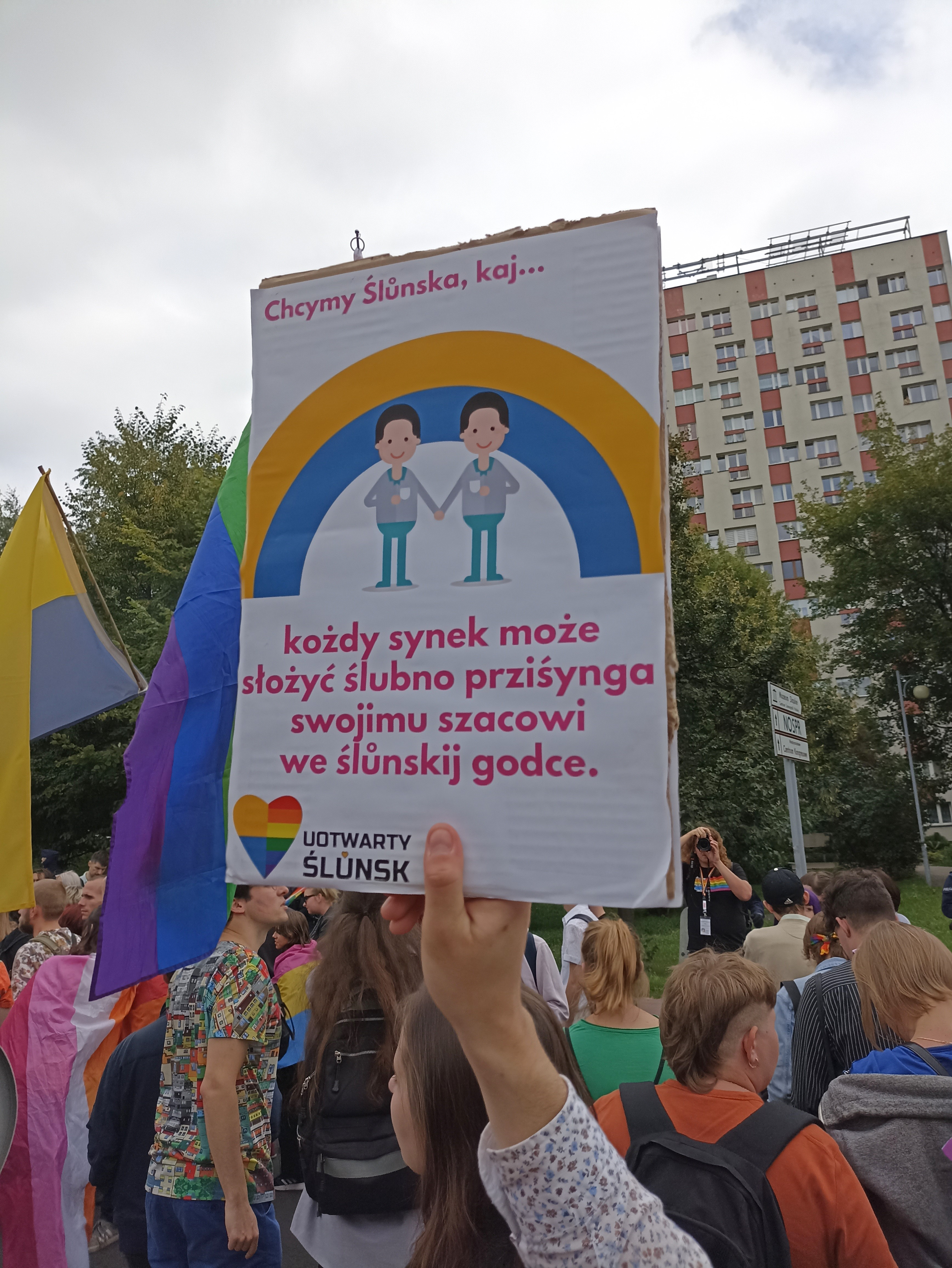
The Silesian language in public space: a banner at the 2022 gay pride in Katowice. "We want Silesia, where every boy can take a vow to his chosen one in the Silesian language."

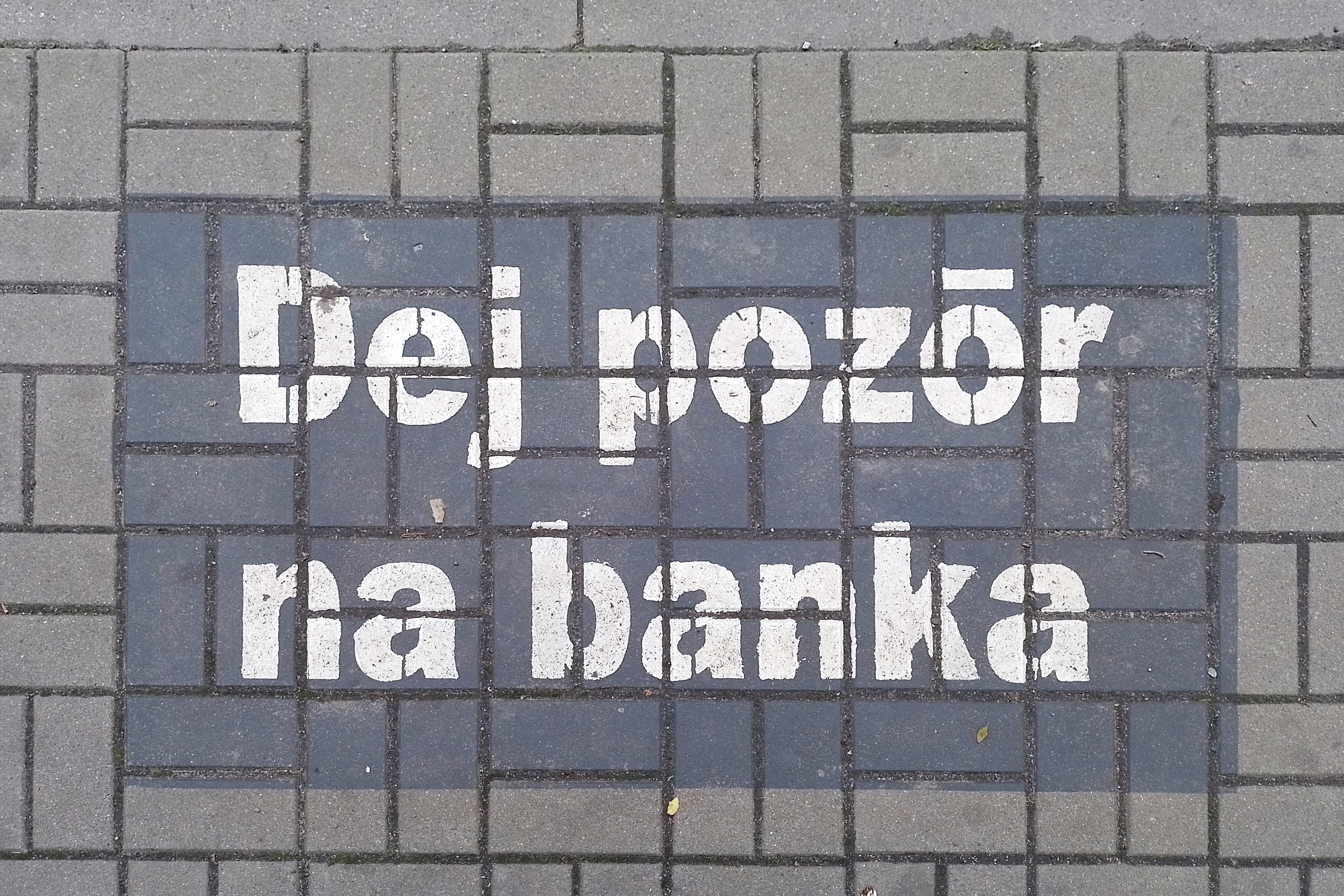
The Silesian language in public space: a warning sign "Watch for trams" on the sidewalk in Chorzów

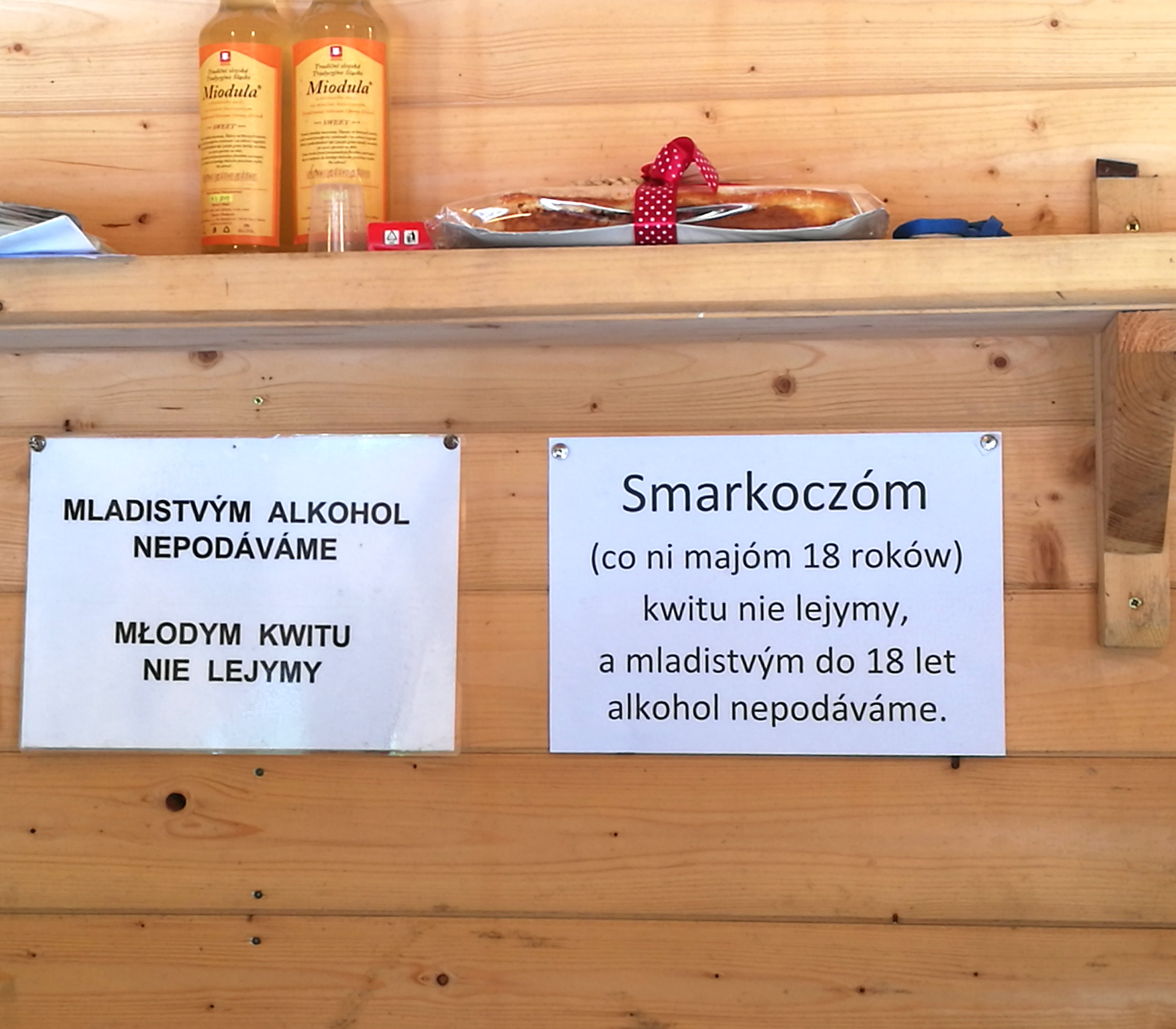
Goral Silesian lect and Czech in Cieszyn, Poland. The text notifies readers that people under the age of 18 will not be served alcohol.

=== Politicization ===
Opinions are divided among linguists regarding whether Silesian is a distinct language, a dialect of Polish, or, in the case of Lach, a variety of Czech. The issue can be contentious, because some Silesians consider themselves to be a distinct nationality within Poland. When Czechs, Poles, and Germans each made claims to substantial parts of Silesia as constituting an integral part of their respective nation-states in the 19th and 20th centuries, the language of Slavic-speaking Silesians became politicized.

Rudolf Abicht, a Slavicist of Upper Silesian extraction who worked at the University of Breslau and proposed an early standardization of the Belarusian language, clearly recognized that standardizing and making Silesian into a language is a socio-political process. In 1920, he expressed his opinion on the subject in an extensive essay on the 'Upper Silesian language question.'

Some, like Óndra Łysohorsky (a poet and author in Czechoslovakia), saw the Silesians as their own distinct people, which culminated in his effort to create a literary standard which he called the "Lachian language". Silesian inhabitants supporting the cause of each of these ethnic groups had their own robust network of supporters across Silesia's political borders which shifted over the course of the 20th century prior to the large-scale ethnic cleansing in the aftermath of World War II.

In 2009, Wojciech Janicki argued that the issue is centred around political considerations, and linguistic arguments represent a post-hoc rationalization for political stances. He stated that the arguments given by linguists who oppose recognizing Silesian a language often "support the thesis of the presence of a separate Silesian language quite unintentionally and accidentally". Janicki brings up the examples of Polish ethnologist Krzysztof Kwaśniewski who stated that "national language is what people speaking it claim and not what linguists judge", and linguist Bogusław Wyderka, who "demonstrates that for 95 per cent of Silesians, their dialect is their primary code, so it exists as a means of identification".

In 2011, Tomasz Kamusella and Andrzej Roczniok published a Silesian-language article on the standardization of the Silesian language.

In 2016, Kamusella argued that the reason for politicization of the Silesian debate is that a part of the Polish national myth is ethnolinguistic homogeneity, one which recognizing Silesians and/or their language as separate from Polish endangers:

In Central Europe language remains the basis of state making, legitimation and maintenance to this day. In this region, the widely accepted normative belief is that a polity to be legitimate, it must be an officially monolingual nation-state, with such a national-cum-official language that is not shared with any other polity in this function. According to this line of political thinking, for instance, if someone speaks Polish, he must be a Pole, a member of the Polish nation, and as such should enjoy citizenship of the Polish nation-state. Therefore, from the vantage point of ethnolinguistic nationalism, it does not make sense that an Austrian speaks German, and not some ‘appropriately’ named Austrian language. Likewise, the Americans may not be a ‘real’ nation, because the United States does not have a national or official language. The normative hold of ethnolinguistic nationalism is so strong in Central Europe that when Czechoslovakia was founded in 1918, it was declared to be the national polity of the Czechoslovak nation, speaking and writing the Czechoslovak language. By the same token, when Yugoslavia broke up in the 1990s, the successor nation-states had to be endowed with their own specific languages, not shared with any other polities or nations. Hence, Serbo-Croatian split into Bosnian, Croatian, Montenegrin and Serbian.

In turn, linguists who consider Silesian a dialect view the decision to classify it as a separate language as politically motivated, comparing it to the dispute of Bosnian, Croatian, Montenegrin, and Serbian as either separate languages or dialects of Serbo-Croatian. Polish linguist Jerzy Bralczyk, despite his political opposition to President Andrzej Duda, supported his veto of a bill that would recognize Silesian as a regional language, arguing classifying Silesian as a language is motivated by political considerations. Professor Bralczyk criticized the decision of the 2024 government to draft the bill, stating that "neither Prime Minister Tusk nor Marshal Hołownia are linguists, which is why I do not approve of their conflict-generating comments driven by political motives", contending that "Silesian remains a dialect rather than a separate language."

=== Views ===
Some linguists from Poland, such as Jolanta Tambor, Juan Lajo, Tomasz Wicherkiewicz, philosopher Jerzy Dadaczyński, sociologist Elżbieta Anna Sekuła, and sociolinguist Tomasz Kamusella, support its status as a language. According to Stanisław Rospond, it is impossible to classify Silesian as a dialect of the contemporary Polish language because he considers it to be descended from Old Polish. Although often, this view is contested with the fact that during the time of Old Polish, the West Slavic regions didn't classify as separate languages, and rather fell into a dialect continuum such as Serbo-Croatian, with Silesian still being different from other dialect regions of the time. According to Kamusella, "between the mid-1990s and mid-2000s, several popular Silesian-Polish dictionaries were published, some of which were quite extensive. Initially, they referred to Silesian as a gwara (dialect) but then increasingly termed it a language." Kamusella also wrote: "During the first decade of the 21st century Silesian was accepted as a language by most of its speakers in Poland, and also by linguists and IT specialists outside Poland."

Other Polish linguists, such as Jan Miodek and Edward Polański, do not support its status as a language. Jan Miodek and Dorota Simonides, prefer to see the preservation of the entire range of Silesian dialects rather than standardization, stating due to its connection with Old Polish, it should not be classified separately. However, with such classification as Jan Miodek uses, taking into account the first "Polish" sentence was found in Silesia, this argument can also be used to call Polish a dialect of Silesian, and even easier with this criterion, viewing Spanish a dialect of Catalan. The German linguist Reinhold Olesch was greatly interested in the "Polish vernaculars" of Upper Silesia and other Slavic varieties such as Kashubian and Polabian. Miodek argues that "there is no major grammatical feature within Silesian, which would not function simultaneously in the dialects of Lesser Poland or Greater Poland, Mazovian or Kashubian".

The United States Immigration Commission in 1911 classified it as one of the dialects of Polish. In their respective surveys of Slavic languages, linguists writing in English such as Alexander M. Schenker, and Robert A. Rothstein, and Roland Sussex and Paul Cubberley listed Silesian as a dialect of Polish in 1993, as did Encyclopædia Britannica. On the question of whether Silesian is a separate Slavic language, Gerd Hentschel wrote in 2001 that "Silesian ... can thus ... without doubt be described as a dialect of Polish" ("Das Schlesische ... kann somit ... ohne Zweifel als Dialekt des Polnischen beschrieben werden"). Since late 2000s, international classifications towards Silesian shifted - in 2007, the US Library of Congress recognized Silesian as a regional language, and SIL International codified it as a new language. In 2011, the European Charter for Minority or Regional Languages recommended that Poland recognizes Silesian as a language.

Dialectologist Jadwiga Wronicz argued that Silesian is a dialect of Polish as this status had been attributed to it at the beginning of the 20th century during research to determine the area of the Polish language. She wrote: "The boundaries between Polish dialects and the dialects of neighbouring languages were defined at the beginning of the 20th century on the basis of intralinguistic features, based on research into the speech of the indigenous population." A similar argument was advanced by the linguist Andrzej Markowski, who stated that the conclusions reached by the 19th-century linguists Jerzy Samuel Bandtkie and Lucjan Malinowski who described Silesian as a variety of Polish should be maintained.

Silesian linguist Henryk Jaroszewicz, who codified Silesian, argues that Silesian constitutes a separate language, and bases his view on the need to prioritize extralinguistic factors of the intralinguistic ones:

The narrative discussed above, according to which the Silesian ethnolect is currently a dialect of the Polish language, is not acceptable in the light of contemporary linguistic theories. The basic mistake committed by the quoted researchers - J. Miodek, J. Wronicz or A. Markowski - is to adhere to the view that the status of certain linguistic codes can be determined, solely on the basis of facts of intra-linguistic nature: genetic or structural. Modern linguistics, however, proved as early as the 1960s that there are no intralinguistic criteria that would ‘stand the more serious test of verification’ and unquestionably allow one to separate languages from dialects (Haugen 1980: 169). This is because it is not intralinguistic properties, but extralinguistic features that have a decisive influence on the final arrangement of linguistic typologies. Among these, the self-consciousness of the users, ‘the will of the users and the respect for this will expressed by their fellow citizens’ (Czesak 2008a: 22), plays a key role, secondarily the steps taken by a given community to codify its own ethnolect.

According to Tomasz Kamusella, arguments against recognizing Silesian as a language are political and contradict modern linguistics, as the standards they base themselves on would entail classifying multiple universally recognized as languages as dialects. He wrote: "It is politics (that is, ethnolinguistic nationalism) only which prevents the recognition of Silesian as a language in Poland. To take at the face value the Polish administration’s claims that Silesian cannot be recognized as a language, due to its underdevelopment in the sphere of grammar standardization and writing, this stance entails a proposal that in the world there are not more than about 200 languages meriting status as ‘a language’. Perhaps, the Polish authorities would rather not stand by this logical – though highly paradoxical – conclusion of their line of thinking on the issue of the Silesian language."

Polish linguist Kazimierz Polański wrote: "The problem of distinguishing languages from dialects is not a purely linguistic problem, it is rather a sociological, psychological problem. To a certain extent, it is also political. It is not possible to establish linguistic criteria to distinguish between a language and a dialect. The main issue here is linguistic awareness, which causes a linguistic community to mature at a certain point and decide to become independent: it develops a dictionary of its language, codifies the rules of its use, its spelling, choice of alphabet, etc. From this point onwards, it is possible to speak of a separate language. From this point onwards, it is possible to speak of a distinct language."

Dialectologist Karol Dejna argued that Polish dialects "are not a derivative of a national language, but partially the opposite – the nationwide language has elevated some of the features that distinguish Polish dialects to the rank of binding norms". He wrote:

In fact, if we think carefully, the first Polish sentence written in Liber fundationis claustri sanctae Mariae Virginis in Heinrichow from 1268, may be as well identified as Silesian, as it quotes the speech of people living in Lower Silesia. On the other hand, the common roots of languages do not mean that they are related once and forever; languages are living communication systems and, as such, may converge or diverge in the course of their development. At present, the Silesian ethnolect seems to meet all the definition features of ‘regional collateral languages’ listed by Tomasz Wicherkiewicz, an expert in the field of language policy; in short, Silesian is an indigenous language, related to the national one (Dachsprache) and functioning as a low-prestige code, perceived as rural and undeveloped, although having quite considerable writings and being an indicator of a strong regional identity.

Among the linguists who argue that Silesian is a language, Witold Mańczak wrote that "the defining feature between ethnolects is lexical, not grammatical, convergence". In this context, 53% of the lexemes characteristic of Silesian also appear in, Lesser Polish, Greater Polish and Masovian dialects, as well as in the Kashubian language, which is referred to as a dialect in the study. Comparison of Silesian to the Lesser Polish dialects (geographically closest to Silesian) shows a marginally different ratio, with 56% of lexemes being shared and 44% being unique to Silesian. This result was interpreted as evidence both for and against Silesian being an independent language. In contrast, Jaroszewicz argued that linguistic proximity is not relevant in determining the status of an ethnolect:

Shared lexical and grammatical properties cannot be treated as a universal criterion for judging the contemporary relations between ethnolects and their current status. Linguistic proximity is only evidence that certain codes had a common developmental path at a specific point in their past – they were subject to the same or similar grammatical and lexical processes and phenomena. However, a community that was once established cannot be treated as timeless and automatically and unthinkingly considered to be current at the present moment. […] The status of a particular ethnolect, classified either as a “language” or a “dialect”, is not a constant value, unchanging and given “once and for all”. The history of linguistics knows cases where an ethnolect, until recently almost universally considered a dialect of another language, began to be treated as a fully-fledged, independent language within a few decades (the case of Ukrainian, Belarusian or Macedonian).

Polish linguist Magdalena Bartkowiak-Lerch cautioned against judging Silesian as a dialect on the basis of its mutual intelligibility with Polish. Bartkowiak-Lerch states that such arguments are "groundless", as this measure is irrelevant in determining whether a lect is a language or a dialect from a linguistic point of view. She notes that the relevance of mutual intelligibility between Polish and Silesian is successfully challenged "by showing quite consistent intelligibility between many Slavic languages", and that "the similarities to Polish, its dialects, and other Slavic languages do not prove Silesian’s genetic dependence on Polish, but simply its systemic and genetic relationship with this language".

Polish linguist Bogusław Wyderka proposed to recognize Silesian as a microlanguage, writing: "Due to its origins and systemic-lexical properties, the Silesian ethnolect is a dialect of the Polish language, but one which in terms of functional development has transcended the boundaries of a dialect, at least in the industrial subregion. Standardisation efforts indicate that it is moving towards a form that I have termed a microlanguage." He argues that because Silesian had expanded into film, theatre, television, radio and computer games, and had also become "the material for a variety of literary genres, including high literature such as Letters from Rome (Polish: Listy z Rzymu) by Zbigniew Kadłubek", it is necessary to speak of "new linguistic formations that have transcended the definitional boundaries of dialect".

In Czechia, disagreement exists concerning the Lach dialects which rose to prominence thanks to Óndra Łysohorsky and his translator Ewald Osers. While some have considered it a separate language, most now view Lach as a dialect of Czech.

=== Comparison to other Slavic languages ===
English	Belarusian	Czech	Kashubian	Polish	Silesian	Slovak	Russian
I	я	já	jô	ja	jŏ	ja	я
also	таксама	také	téż	też	tyż	tiež	также
which	якія	která	chtëré	które	kere	ktoré	которое
not	не	ne	nie	nie	niy	nie	не
or	або	nebo	abò	albo	abo/lebo	alebo	или
is	ёсць	je	je	jest	je	je	есть
every	кожны	každý	kòżdi	każdy	kŏżdy	každý	каждый
knows	ведае	ví	wié	wie	wiy/znŏ	vie	знает
always	заўсёды	vždy	zawdë	zawsze	wdycki/zŏwdy	vždy	всегда
except	акрамя	kromě	króm	(o)prócz	(ô)krōm	okrem	кроме
why	чаму	proč	czemù	dlaczego/czemu	pōjakimu/czamu	prečo	почему
(reflexive pronoun)	ца	se	sã	się	siã	sa	ся
(infinitive suffix)	-ць	-t	-c	-ć	-ć	-ť	-ть
I can	магу	můžu	mògã	mogę	mogã	môžem	могу
will be	будзе	bude	bãdze	będzie	baje/bydzie	bude	будет

== Phonology ==
=== Vowels ===
Oral Vowels
	Front	Central	Back
Close	i		u
Close-mid	ɪ		o
Open-mid	ɛ		ɔ
Open		a	

Nasal Vowels (only in Western dialects)
	Front	Central	Back
Mid			õ
Open		ã	

=== Consonants ===
Consonants
		Labial	Dental/ Alveolar	Retroflex	(Alveolo-) palatal	Velar
Nasal		m	n		ɲ	
Plosive	voiceless	p	t			k
Plosive	voiced	b	d			ɡ
Affricate	voiceless		t͡s	t͡ʂ	t͡ɕ	
Affricate	voiced		d͡z	d͡ʐ	d͡ʑ	
Fricative	voiceless	f	s	ʂ	ɕ	x
Fricative	voiced	v	z	ʐ	ʑ	
Trill			r			
Approximant		(w)	l		j	w

== Writing system ==
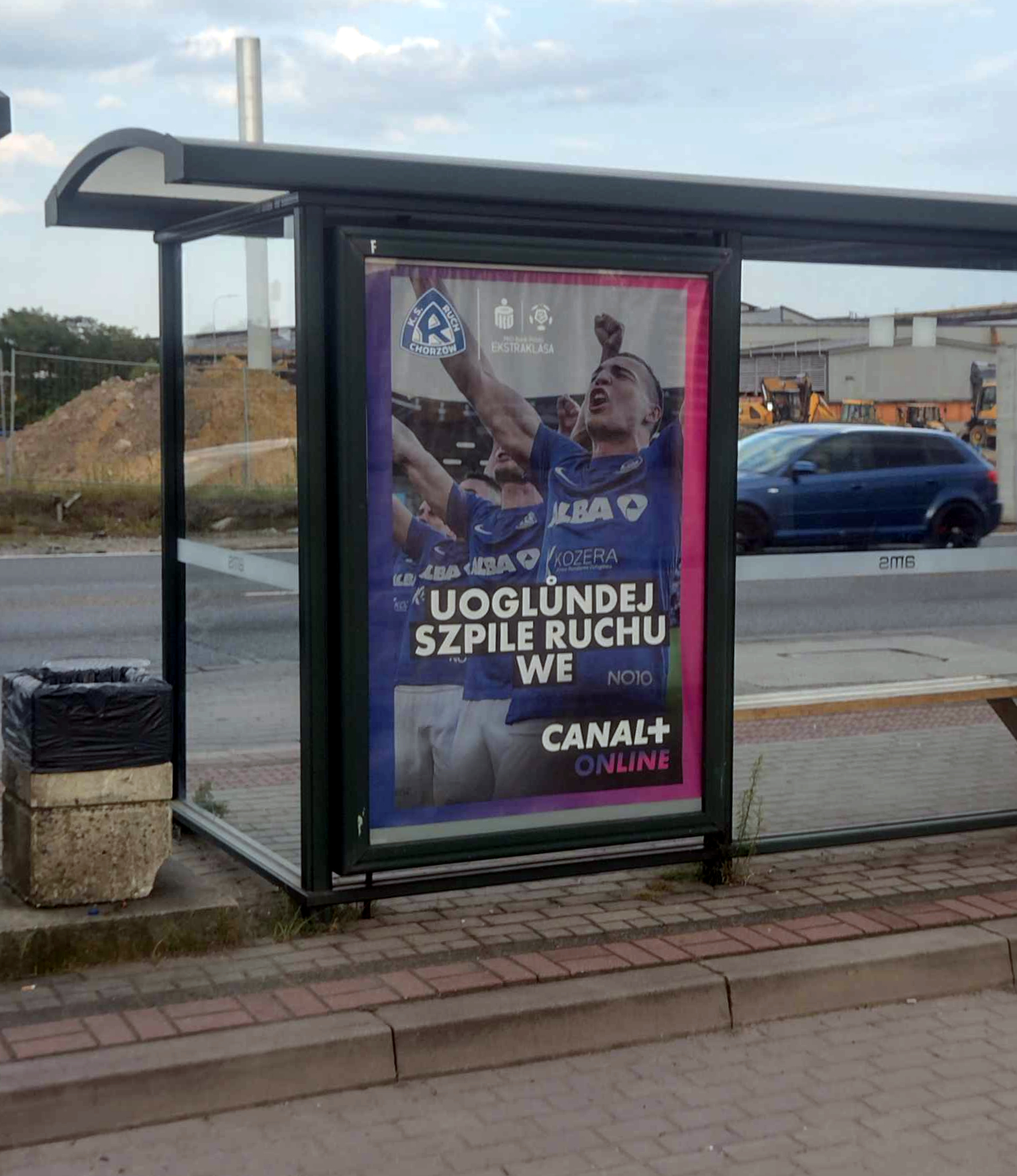
An advertisement for the Canal+ TV channel at a bus stop in Chorzów in the Silesian language written in the Steuer spelling. The translation is "Watch Ruch (Chorzów) matches on Canal+"

There have been a number of attempts at codifying the language spoken by Slavophones in Silesia. Probably the most well-known was undertaken by Óndra Łysohorsky when codifying the Lachian dialects in creating the Lachian literary language in the early 20th century.

Ślabikŏrzowy szrajbōnek is the relatively new alphabet created by the Pro Loquela Silesiana organization to reflect the sounds of all Silesian dialects. It was approved by Silesian organizations affiliated in Rada Górnośląska. Ubuntu translation is in this alphabet as is some of the Silesian Wikipedia, although some of it is in Steuer's alphabet. It is used in a few books, including the Silesian alphabet book.

Letters: A, Ã, B, C, Ć, D, E, F, G, H, I, J, K, L, Ł, M, N, Ń, O, Ŏ, Ō, Ô, Õ, P, R, S, Ś, T, U, W, Y, Z, Ź, Ż.

One of the first alphabets created specifically for Silesian was Steuer's Silesian alphabet, created in the Interwar period and used by Feliks Steuer for his poems in Silesian. The alphabet consists of 30 graphemes and eight digraphs:

Letters: A, B, C, Ć, D, E, F, G, H, I, J, K, L, Ł, M, N, Ń, O, P, R, S, Ś, T, U, Ů, W, Y, Z, Ź, Ż
Digraphs: Au, Ch, Cz, Dz, Dź, Dż, Rz, Sz

Based on the Steuer alphabet, in 2006 the Silesian Phonetic Alphabet was proposed:

Letters: A, B, C, Ć, Č, D, E, F, G, H, I, J, K, L, M, N, Ń, O, P, R, Ř, S, Ś, Š, T, U, Ů, W, Y, Z, Ź, Ž.

Silesian's phonetic alphabet replaces the digraphs with single letters (Sz with Š, etc.) and does not include the letter Ł, whose sound can be represented phonetically with U. It is therefore the alphabet that contains the fewest letters. Although it is the most phonetically logical, it did not become popular with Silesian organizations, with the argument that it contains too many caron diacritics and hence resembles the Czech alphabet. Large parts of the Silesian Wikipedia, however, are written in Silesian's phonetic alphabet.

Sometimes other alphabets are also used, such as the "Tadzikowy muster" (for the National Dictation Contest of the Silesian language) or the Polish alphabet, but writing in this alphabet is problematic as it does not allow for the differentiation and representation of all Silesian sounds.

== Culture ==
Silesian has recently seen an increased use in culture, for example:

- Wachtyrz.eu, online news and information platform (founded in January 2018)
- YouTube personalities such as Niklaus Pieron
- TV and radio stations (for example: TV Silesia, Sfera TV, TVP3 Katowice, Slonsky Radio, Radio Piekary, Radio Silesia, Radio Fest);
- Music groups (for example: Jan Skrzek, Krzysztof Hanke, Hasiok, Dohtor Miód, FEET);
- Theatre (for example: Polterabend in Silesian Theatre);
- Plays
- Film (for example: The Sinful Life of Franciszek Buła ("Grzeszny żywot Franciszka Buły"))
- Books (for example, the so-called Silesian Bible; poetry: "Myśli ukryte" by Karol Gwóźdź)
- Teaching aides (for example, a Silesian basal reader)

== Recognition ==
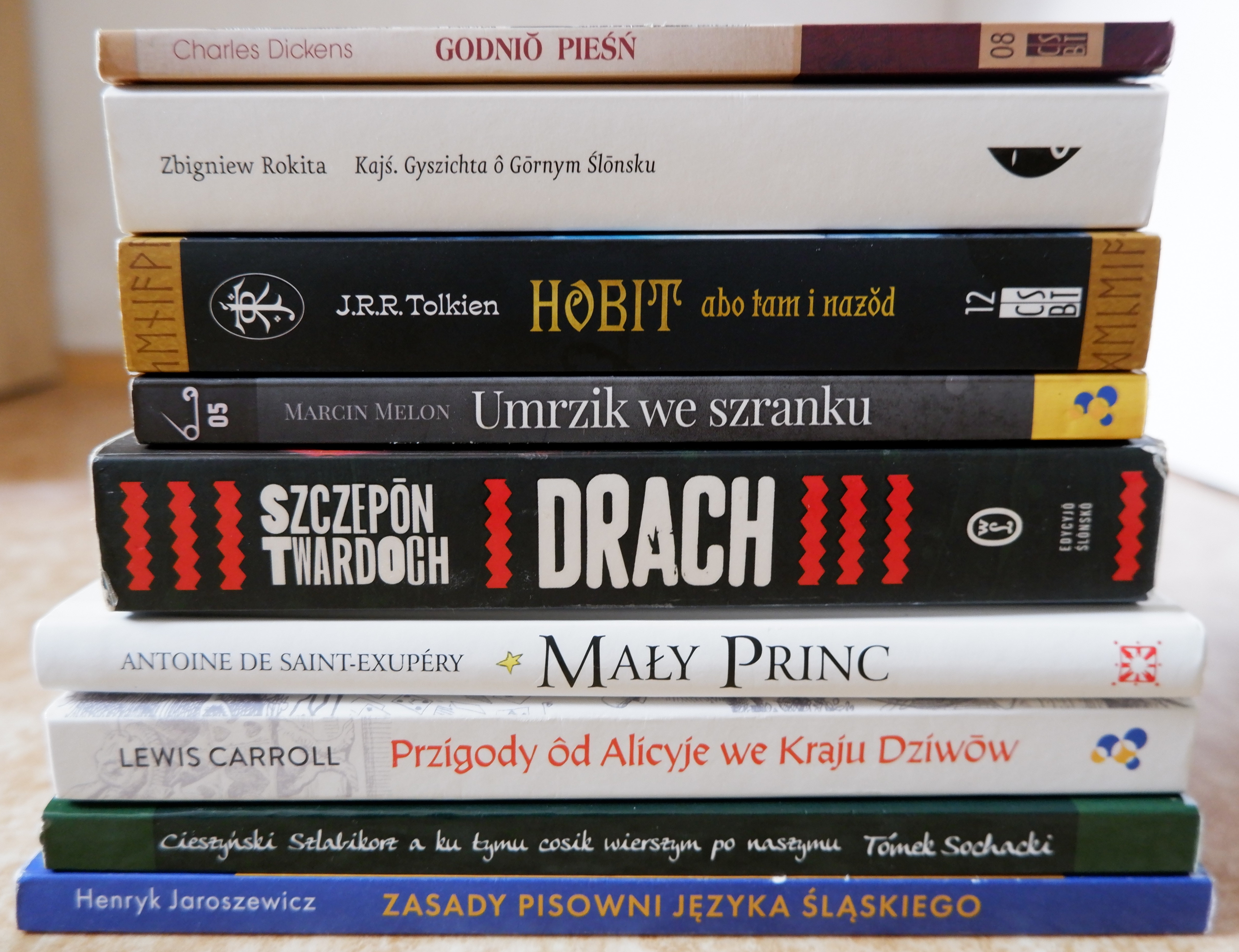
Examples of books in Silesian, e.g. translations of The Hobbit, The Little Prince or A Christmas Carol

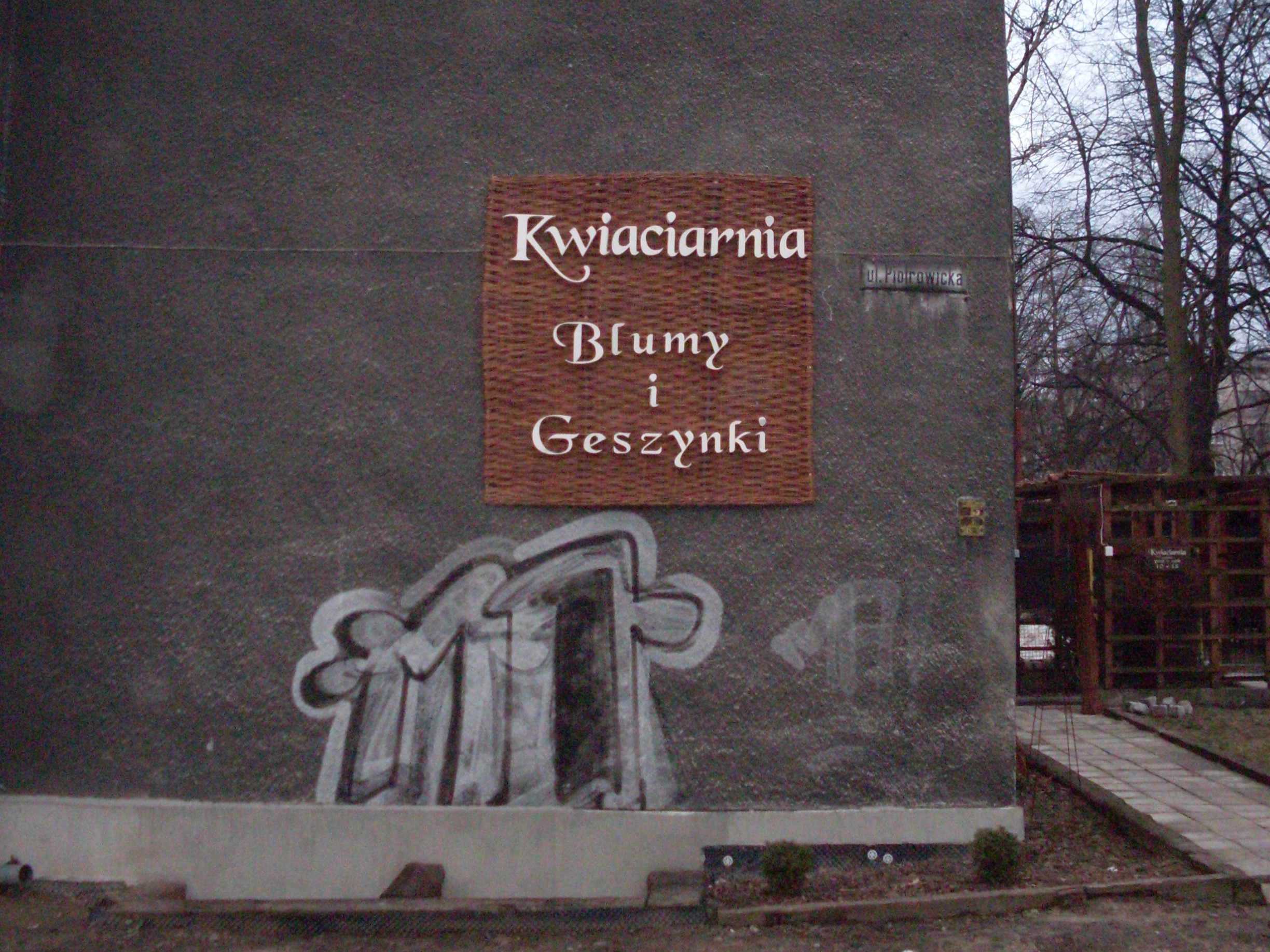
Bilingual sign in Katowice (Katowicy): Polish Kwiaciarnia ("florist") and Silesian Blumy i Geszynki ("flowers and gifts"). The latter also exemplifies the Germanisms in Silesian (cf. German Blumen und Geschenke).

In 2003, the National Publishing Company of Silesia (Narodowa Oficyna Śląska) commenced operations. This publisher was founded by the Alliance of the People of the Silesian Nation (Związek Ludności Narodowości Śląskiej) and it prints books about Silesia and books in Silesian language.

In July 2007, the Slavic Silesian language was given the ISO 639-3 code szl.

On 6 September 2007, 23 politicians of the Polish parliament made a statement about a new law to give Silesian the official status of a regional language.

On 7 September 2007, the MPs of Self-Defence of the Republic of Poland, League of Polish Families, People's National Movement and the Polish People's Party submitted a bill recognizing Silesian as a regional language in Poland. The bill did not pass because the Sejm was dissolved before it could be voted on, triggering a snap election.

The first official National Dictation Contest of the Silesian language (Ogólnopolskie Dyktando Języka Śląskiego) took place in August 2007. In dictation as many as 10 forms of writing systems and orthography have been accepted.

On 30 January 2008 and in June 2008, two organizations promoting Silesian language were established: Pro Loquela Silesiana and Tôwarzistwo Piastowaniô Ślónskij Môwy "Danga".

On 26 May 2008, the Silesian Wikipedia was founded.

On 30 June 2008 in the edifice of the Silesian Parliament in Katowice, a conference took place on the status of the Silesian language. This conference was a forum for politicians, linguists, representatives of interested organizations and persons who deal with the Silesian language. The conference was titled "Silesian – Still a Dialect or Already a Language?" (Śląsko godka – jeszcze gwara czy jednak już język?).

In 2012, the Ministry of Administration and Digitization registered the Silesian language in Annex 1 to the Regulation on the state register of geographical names; however, in a November 2013 amendment to the regulation, Silesian is not included.

On 26 April 2024, the Sejm voted 236–186 with five abstentions to recognise Silesian as a regional language. On 29 May 2024, President Andrzej Duda vetoed the bill.

On 24 May 2024, the book "Myśli ukryte" by Karol Gwóźdź was translated from the original Silesian language into Ukrainian, a landmark event for Silesian culture as the first translation of a Silesian-language publication into a foreign language.

On 26 June 2024, Silesian was added to the languages offered in the Google Translate service.

On 9 January 2026, the Sejm voted 224–196 with twenty abstentions to recognize Silesian as regional language in Poland. The bill also postulated "an increase in the representation of the Silesian community in state consultative bodies". The bill then had to be either signed or vetoed by President Karol Nawrocki. Previously in 2025, Nawrocki vetoed a bill recognizing the endangered Wymysorys language spoken by Vilamovians as a regional language in Poland. Linguist from the University of Wrocław Henryk Jaroszewicz prepared an open letter requesting President Nawrocki to sign the bill. Together with the professors of University of Silesia, Jaroszewicz collected signatures of language scientists such as Tadeusz Sławek, Sławomir Łodziński, Lech Nijakowski, Katarzyna Kłosińska, and Michał Rusinek. The letter argued that although Silesian "is historically linked to the Polish dialect area, the functional changes that Silesian has undergone in recent decades no longer allow it to be treated as a dialect". The Katowice City Counil and Silesian Voivodeship Sejmik also appealed to Nawrocki to approve the bill. On 12 February 2026, Nawrocki vetoed the bill.

== Gallery ==
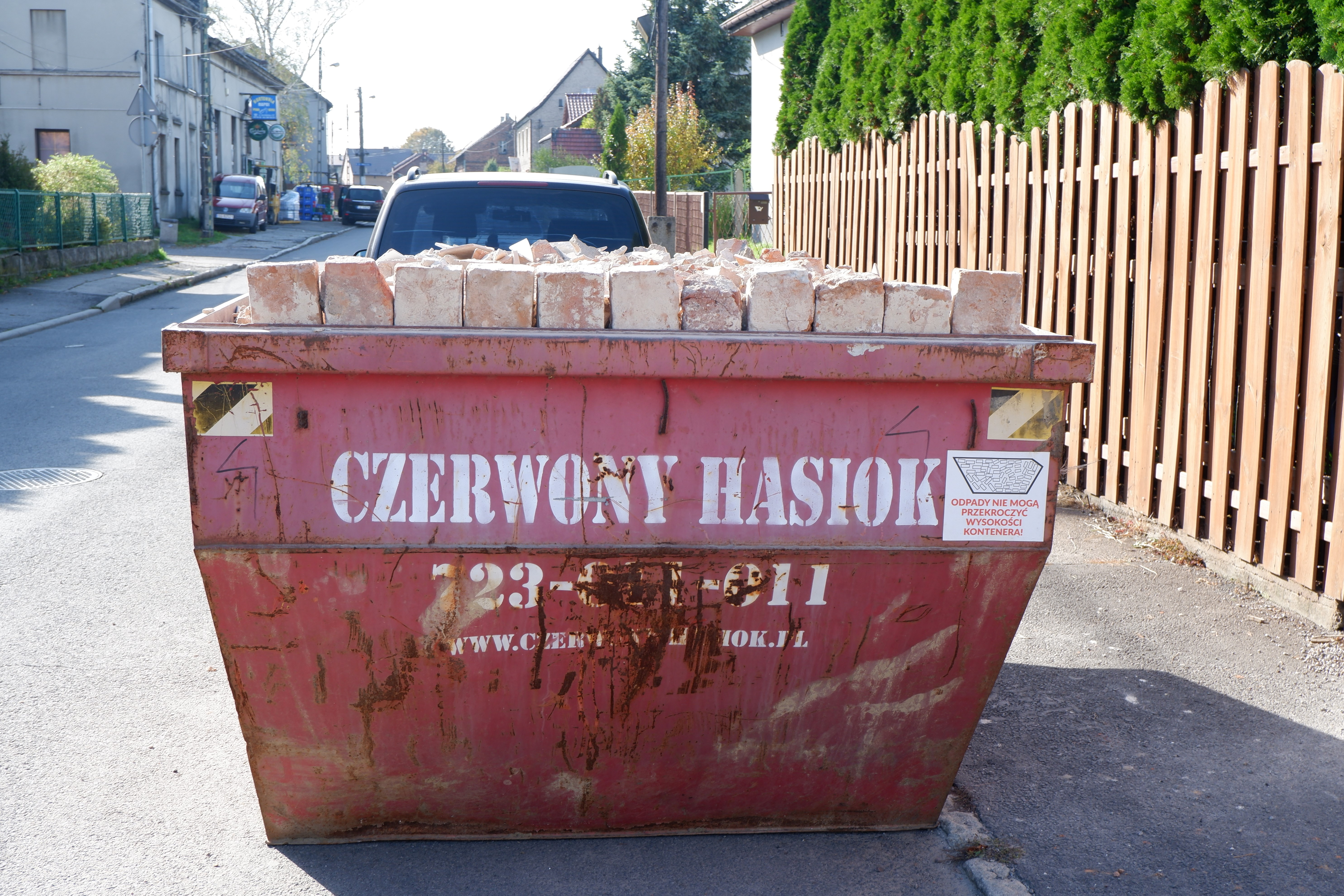
A waste container with the inscription in Silesian Czerwony Hasiok (red trash can)

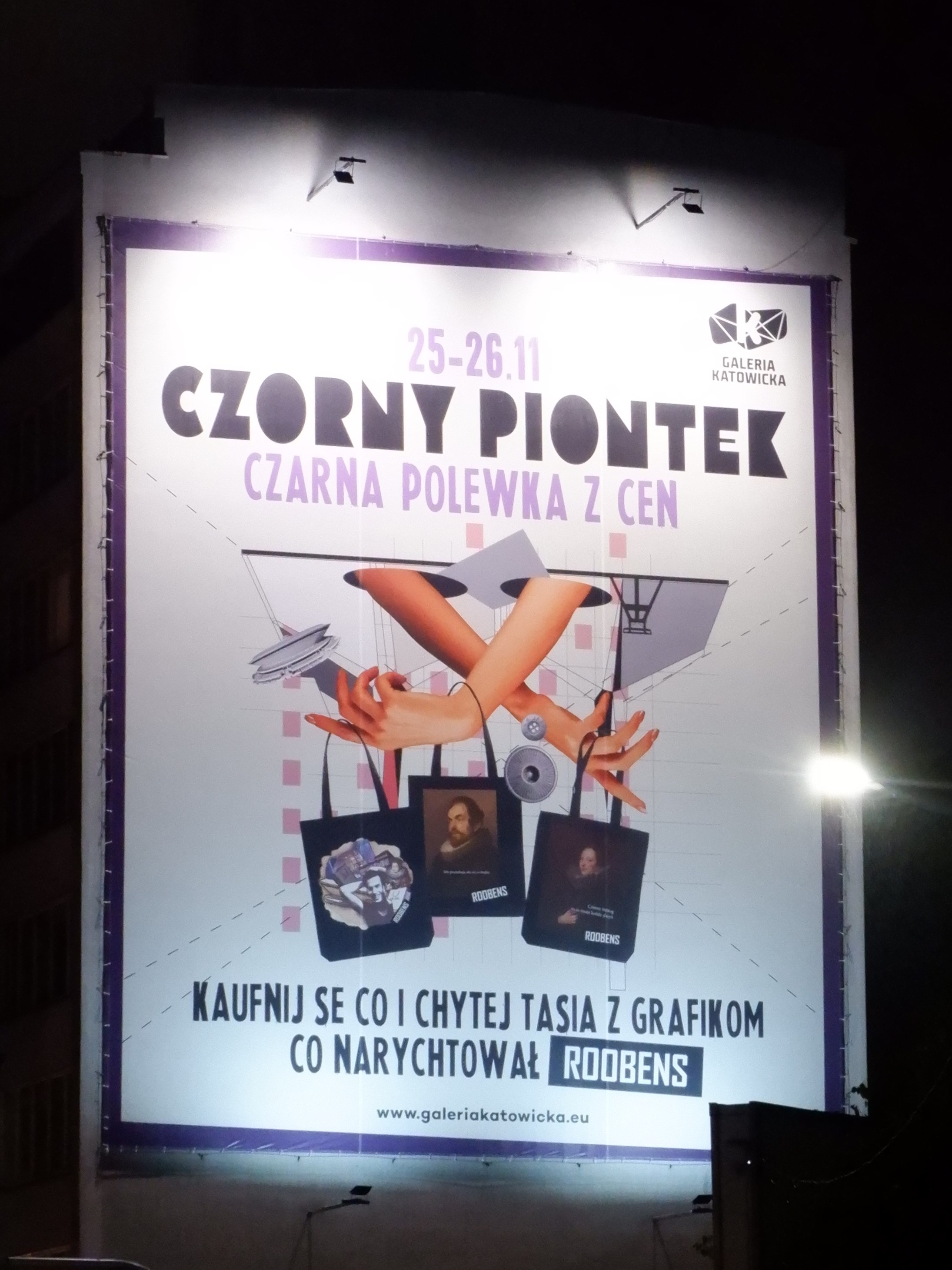
An advertising billboard of Galeria Katowicka shopping mall that means "Black Friday. Buy something and get a bag with a graphic designed by Roobens"

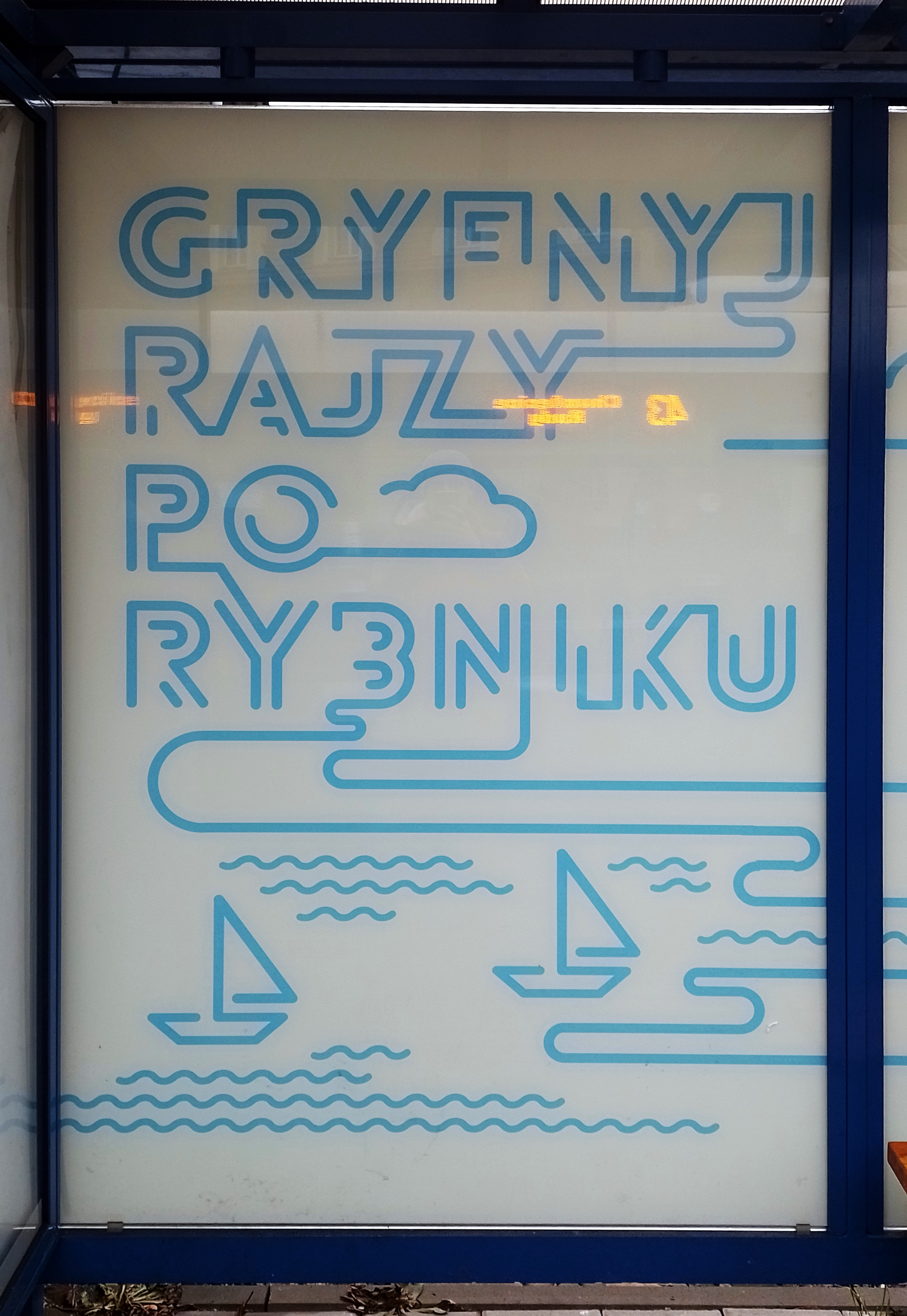
A promotional poster of the ZTZ Rybnik bus company with the phrase Gryfnyj rajzy po Rybniku, which means "Have a nice trip around Rybnik"

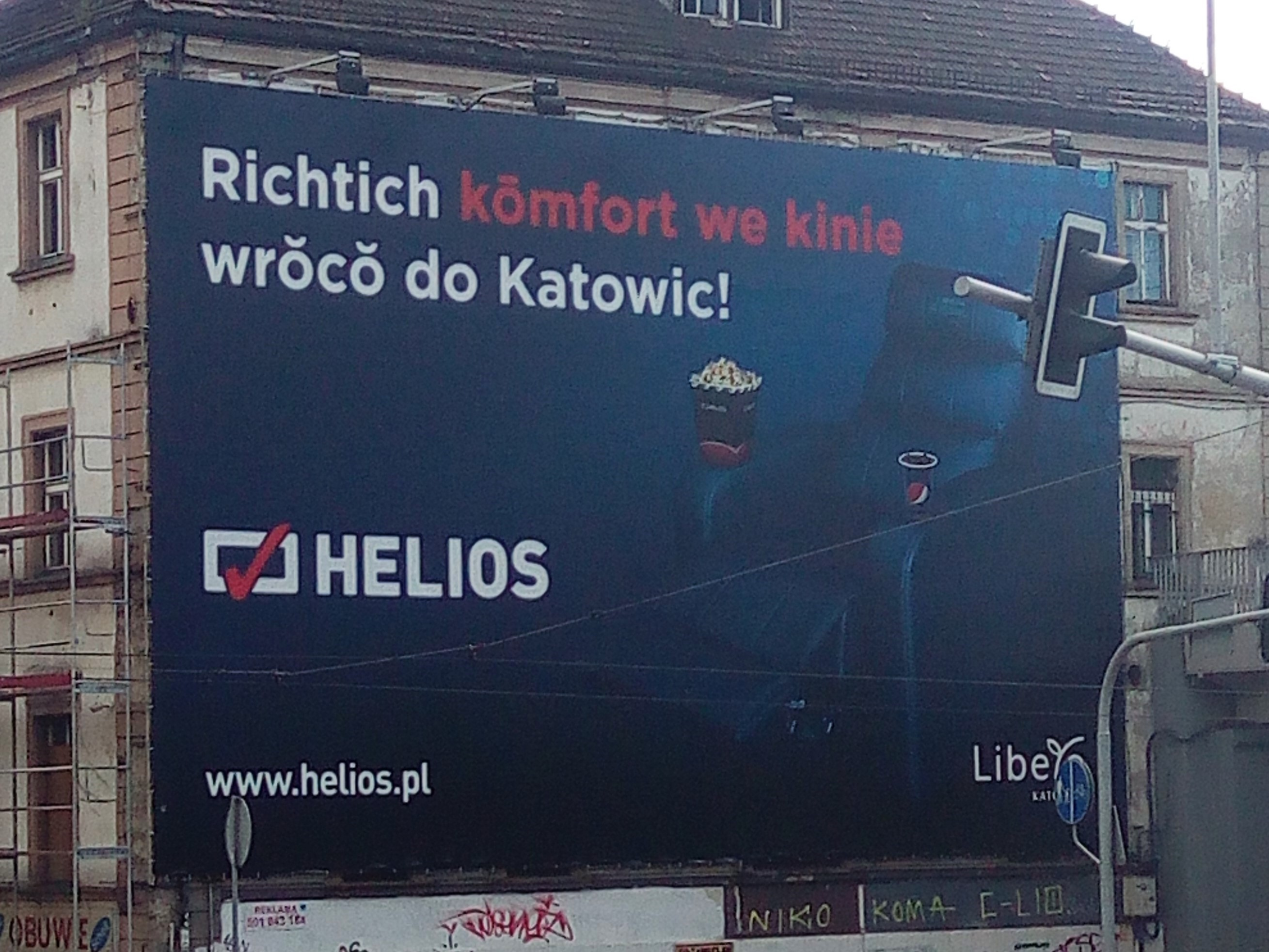
An advertising billboard in Silesian which means "True comfort in the cinema returns to Katowice! Helios"

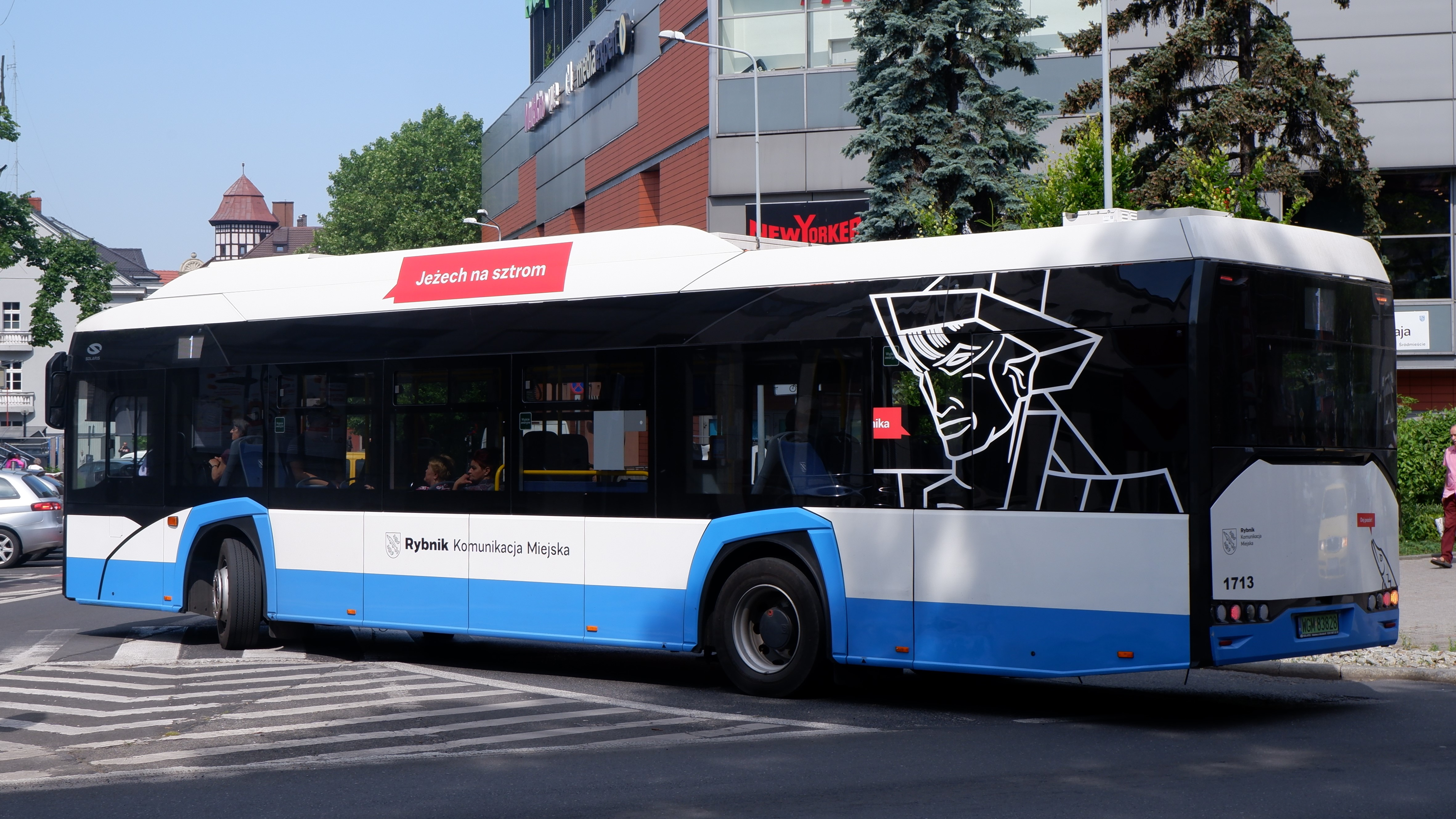
Public transport bus in Rybnik with the inscription "Jeżech na sztrom" (I'm electric)

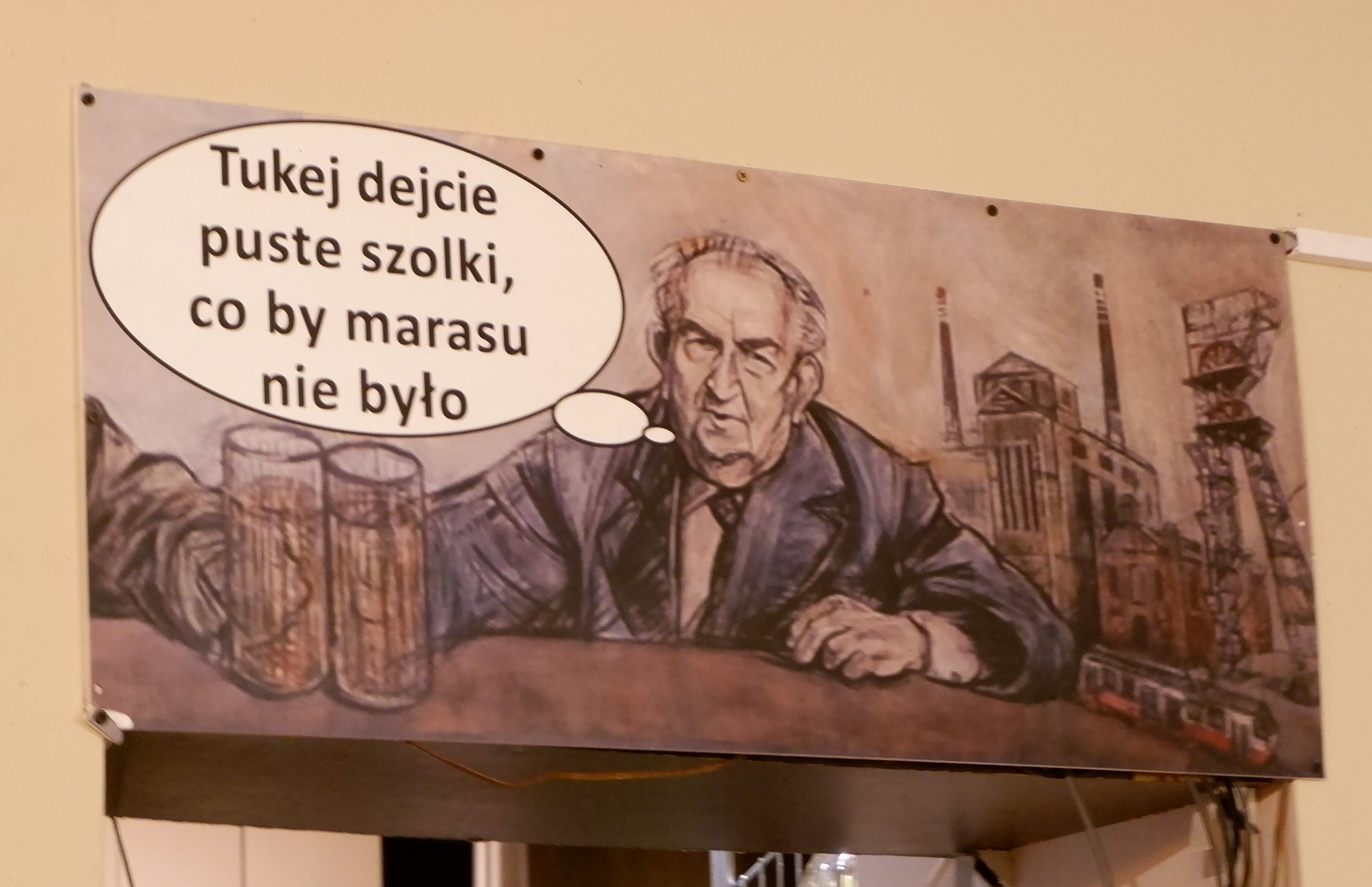
"Leave the empty glasses here so there is no mess" as a cartoon speech of Jerzy Ziętek (former general and governor of Katowice) in Rebel Garden Café in Chorzów

== See also ==
- List of Silesian-language films
- Silesian German
- Texas Silesian
- Wymysorys, West Germanic language in Wilamowice, Silesian Voivodeship
- Alzenau, East Central German dialect spoken in the former village of Hałcnów, which is now a district of Bielsko-Biała, Silesian Voivodeship
- Cieszyn Silesian
