= Niemodlin dialect =

Dialect of Silesian

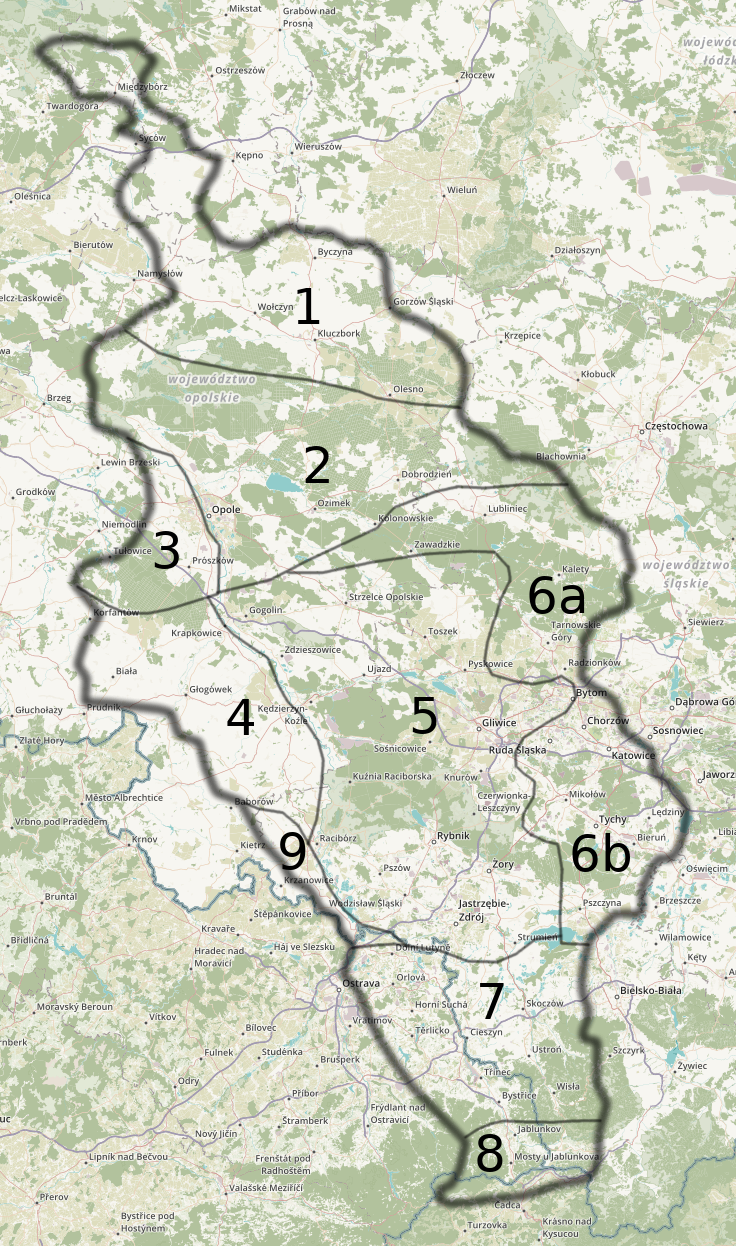
Niemodlin dialect (3) within Silesian dialects

The Niemodlin dialect (Polish: gwary niemodlińskie, Silesian: niymodlińskie gwar, niymodliński dialekt, pronunciation: ɲɨmɔˈdliɲski ˈdjalɨkt) is a Silesian dialect, used in the parts of the city of Niemodlin, Poland. It slightly differs from standard Silesian by having a characteristic pronunciation called mazuration (mazurzenie), which means that the consonants cz sz ż dż are pronounced as the alveolars c s z dz (IPA: [ts], [s], [z], and [dz], respectively). In Niemodlin Silesian phonology a nasalized vowel y ([ɨ̃]) may also occur.

It is closely related to the Prudnik dialect.

== Example of the dialect ==
Jak my byli chopcy, to my śli tys cansto na gřiby. Noubaři my śe radowali, jak my nouwjancyj prawikůw a růtkopůw nazbjyrali, bo te bůuy bardzo twardy do krouńou. Prawiki a růtkopy – z wjankša rosnům we břuskach. Śińouki a kuřůntka – te z wjankša rosnům zajś we śwjyrckach. Majślouki tys sům dobry, yno te žoudyn ńe chćou zajś roud uodźyrać, bo te musům zajś być uodźyrany, a bardzo śe lepjům po palcach. Bźony – te rosnům zajś na ślagach, na tych uodźymkach uod strumůw. I poram muchorůutkůw my tys přinůjśli, co na muchy jadźić.
