= Silesian Wikipedia =

Silesian-language edition of Wikipedia

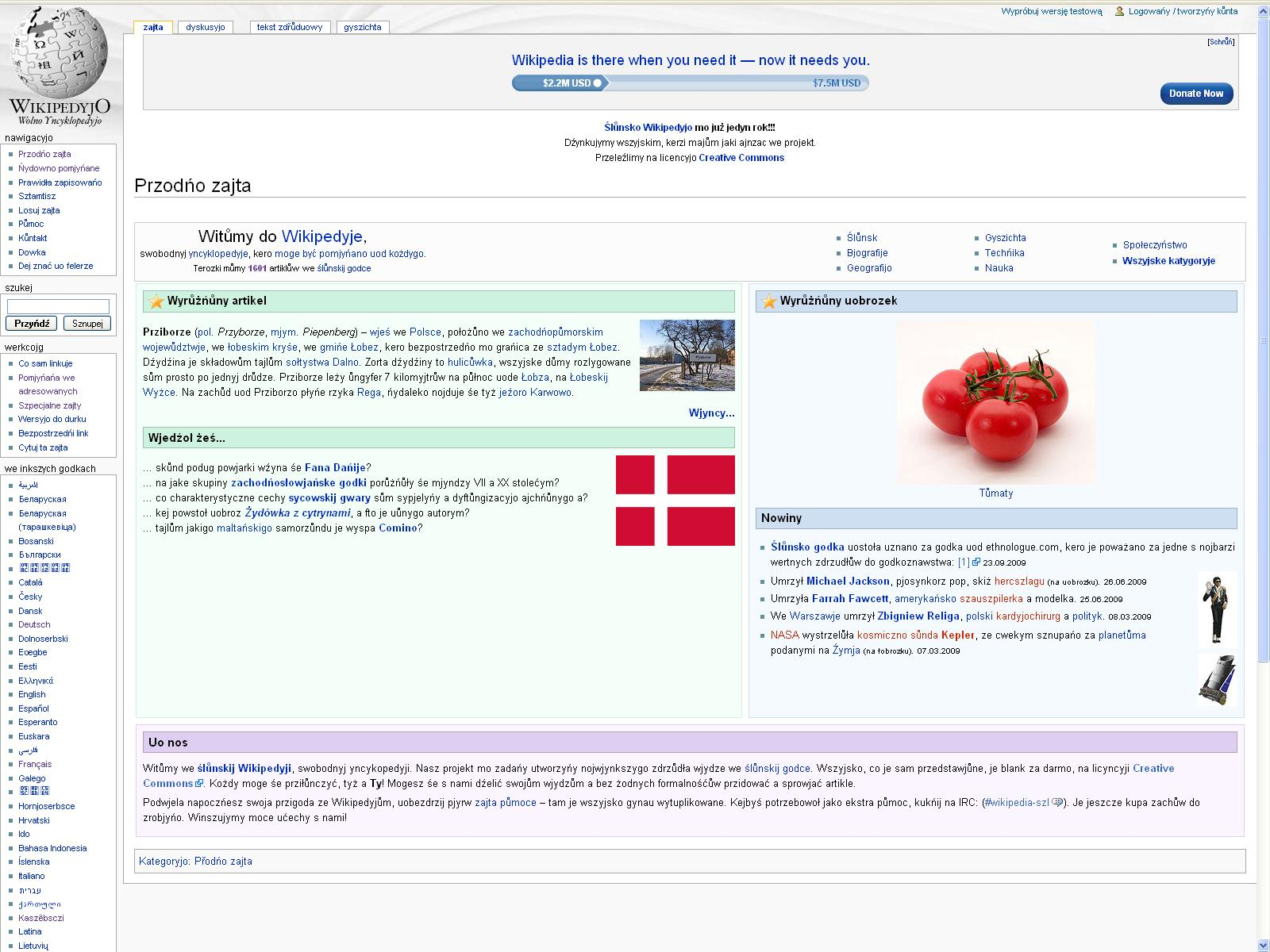
- Screenshot The Main Page of the Silesian Wikipedia (December 2009).
- Website type: Internet encyclopedia project
- Available in: Silesian
- Owner: Wikimedia Foundation
- Website: szl.wikipedia.org
- Commercial: No. Charitable
- Registration: Optional
- Launched: 26 May 2008
- Content license: Creative Commons Attribution/ Share-Alike 4.0 (most text also dual-licensed under GFDL); Media licensing varies

The Silesian Wikipedia (Silesian: Ślůnsko Wikipedyjo / Ślōnskŏ Wikipedyjŏ) is the Silesian edition of Wikipedia. It was started on 26 May 2008. As of 27 September 2026, it contains 61,401 articles and has 30,634 editors.

== History ==
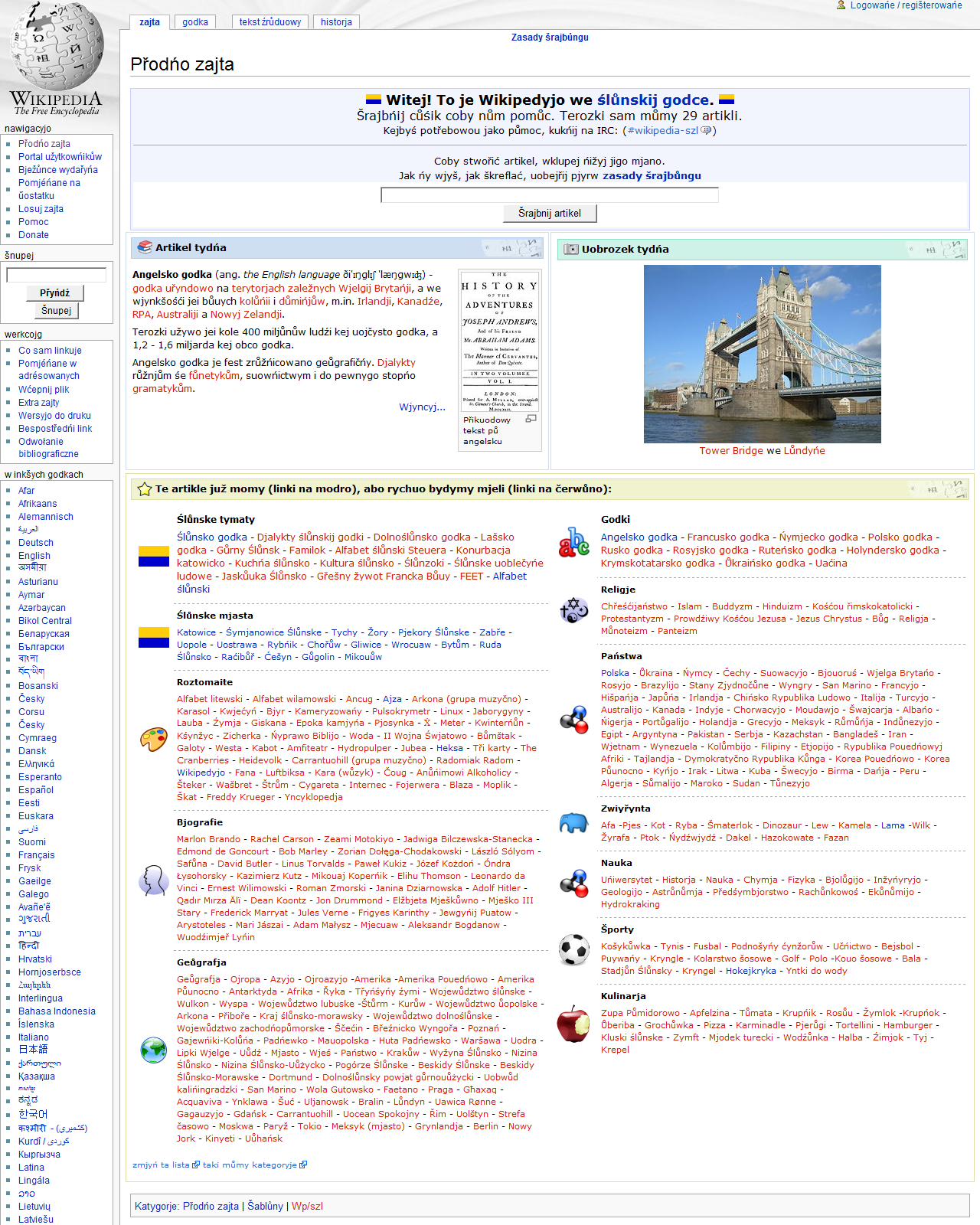
Screen of first day of action Silesian Wikipedia

The first attempt to launch the Silesian Wikipedia project took place in March 2006, but because of negative comments in the discussion section, the proposal was rejected. In 2007 Wikipedia officially registered the Silesian language in its list of languages. The International Linguistic Organization SIL International followed this step on 18 July 2007 and International Organization for Standardization (ISO) assigned it the ISO code "szl".

A second application for a Wikipedia project in the Silesian language was submitted on 19 March 2008 as a result of discussions on the removal of articles written in Silesian language, which remained in the Polish edition of Wikipedia (in Silesia Wikiproject). After the initial acceptance of the proposal (100% positive, 0% negative votes) 31 March 2008, a test project was created in the Incubator Wikimedia projects. The following month it contained 100 articles in Silesian, including more than 1,800 separate pages. After two months all the eight requirements necessary to create a new Wikipedia were implemented. In reply to the Wikimedia Foundation's query, on 16 May 2008, the then sole academic authority on the Silesian language, Tomasz Kamusella, supported this initiative. Finally, a Silesian Wikipedia was founded on 26 May 2008. The 1,000th article was included on 15 November 2008.

In October 2010, the Silesian Wikipedia was mentioned as one of the arguments for Silesian to become one of the regional languages in Poland. The project of the law implementing Silesian as a regional language was introduced to Sejm by parliament member Marek Plura.

== Statistics ==
Data from 27 September 2026:

Number of edits	~389,000
Articles	61,401
All pages	78,176
Registered users	30,634
Administrators	2
