= Feliks Steuer =

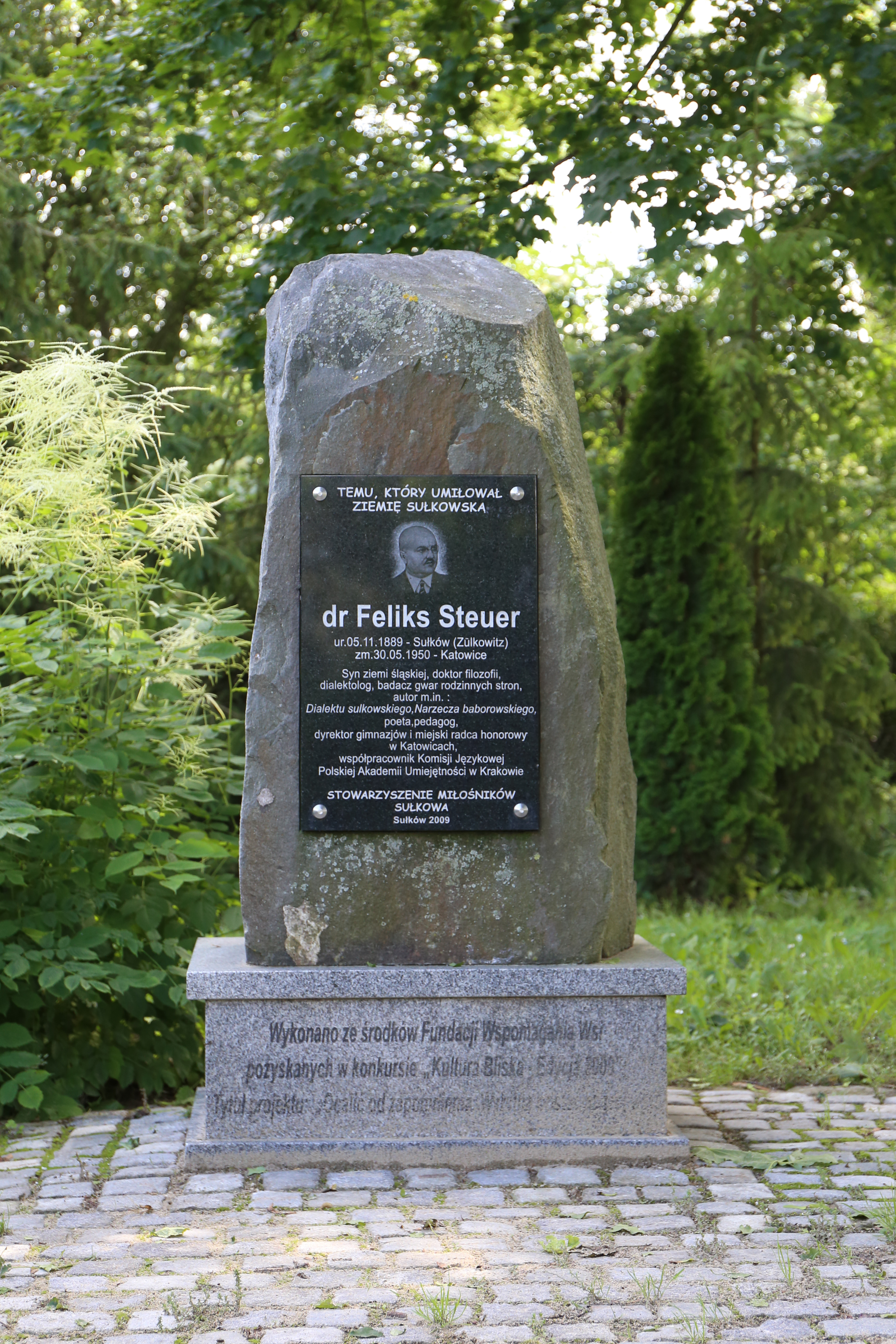
Memorial of Feliks Steuer in Sulków

Feliks Steuer (November 5, 1889 – May 30, 1950) was a Silesian educationist.

== Education and career ==
He was born in Zülkowitz (then Prussian Silesia, now Sulków in Poland).

He was educated in Leobschütz (Czech: Hlubčice, Polish: Głubczyce). He studied Slavic languages at the Faculty of Philology in Innsbruck and in the University of Breslau (German: Universität Breslau; Latin: Universitas Wratislaviensis; Polish: Uniwersytet Wrocławski).

He was an author of several books on Silesian language, and a creator of the Steuer's Silesian Alphabet (Silesian: Steuerowy szrajbůnek).

== World war I ==
During World War I, he fought in the Western Front where was injured and lost his leg. After the war he was a director in two gymnasiums in Katowice (Upper Silesia).

== Death ==
Steuer died in Katowice.
