= Tomasz Wicherkiewicz =

Polish linguist

Tomasz Wicherkiewicz (born 1967) is a Polish linguist who is Professor of Linguistics and Chair at Adam Mickiewicz University in Poznań.

== Publications in English ==
- "Endangered languages. In Search of a Comprehensive Model for Research and Revitalization" (z Justyną Olko), in: Integral strategies for language revitalization, ed. J. Olko, T. Wicherkiewicz, R. Borges, Wydział AL, Uniwersytet Warszawski, Warszawa 2016, p. 653-680.
- The Ukrainian & Ruthenian languages in education in Poland, Mercator-Education Regional Dossiers, Fryske Akademy, Ljouwert, 2006.
- The Lithuanian language in education in Poland, Mercator-Education Regional Dossiers, Fryske Akademy, Ljouwert, 2005.
- The Kashubian language in education in Poland, Mercator-Education Regional Dossiers, Fryske Akademy, Ljouwert, 2004.
- The Making of a Language. The Case of the Idiom of Wilamowice, Southern Poland, Mouton de Gruyter, Berlin-New York, 2003, ISBN 978-3-11-090540-3
- Klessa, Katarzyna & Tomasz Wicherkiewicz "Design and Implementation of an Online Database for Endangered Languages: Multilingual Heritage of Poland", in: F.A. Almeida i in. (red.) Input a Word, Analyze the World: Selected Approaches to Corpus Linguistics. Cambridge Scholars Publishing, 2016; 9-24.
- Hornsby, Michael & Tomasz Wicherkiewicz, "To Be or Not to Be (A Minority)? The Case of the Kashubians in Poland", in: I.Horváth & M.Tonk (red.) Minority politics within the Europe of regions. Scientia Kiadó, 2011; 141-153.
- "Becoming a regional language - a method in language status planning?", in: Actes del 2n Congrés Europeu sobre Planificació Lingüística. Generalitat de Catalunya, 2002; 473-476.
- Majewicz, Alfred F. & Tomasz Wicherkiewicz, "Minority Rights Abuse in Communist Poland and Inherited Issues", Acta Slavica Iaponica 16, 1998: 54-73.
- "The Sociolinguistic Situation of the German Minority in Poland". Rijksuniversiteit Groningen, 1995.
