= Lach dialects =

Group of West Slavic dialects

Lach
- Lachian, Yalach, Lasky
- Laština
- (Transition between Czech and Polish with German influence)
- Native to: Czechia
- Region: Moravia-Silesia
- Ethnicity: Lachians, Silesians
- Native speakers: 700,000
- Language family: Indo-European: Balto-Slavic; Slavic; West Slavic; Transitional; Lach
- Early forms: Old West Slavic: Proto-Slavic; Proto Balto-Slavic
- Dialects: West Lachian; East Lachian; South Lachian

Language codes
- ISO 639-3: –
- Glottolog: lach1246
- Linguasphere: 53-AAA-dam
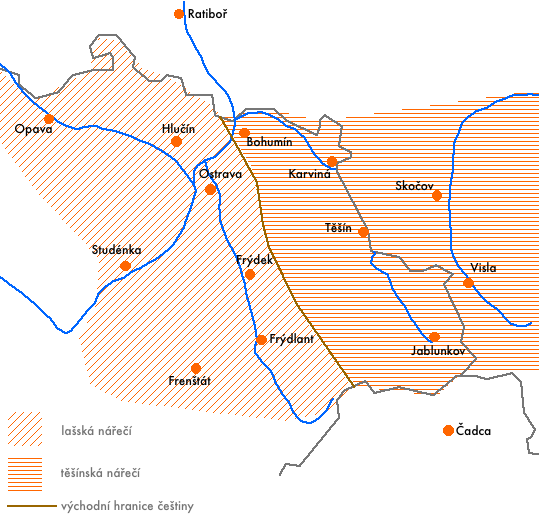
- Map showing the distribution of the Lachian dialects (west) and the Cieszyn Silesian dialect (east) in the Czech-Polish-Slovak borderlands.

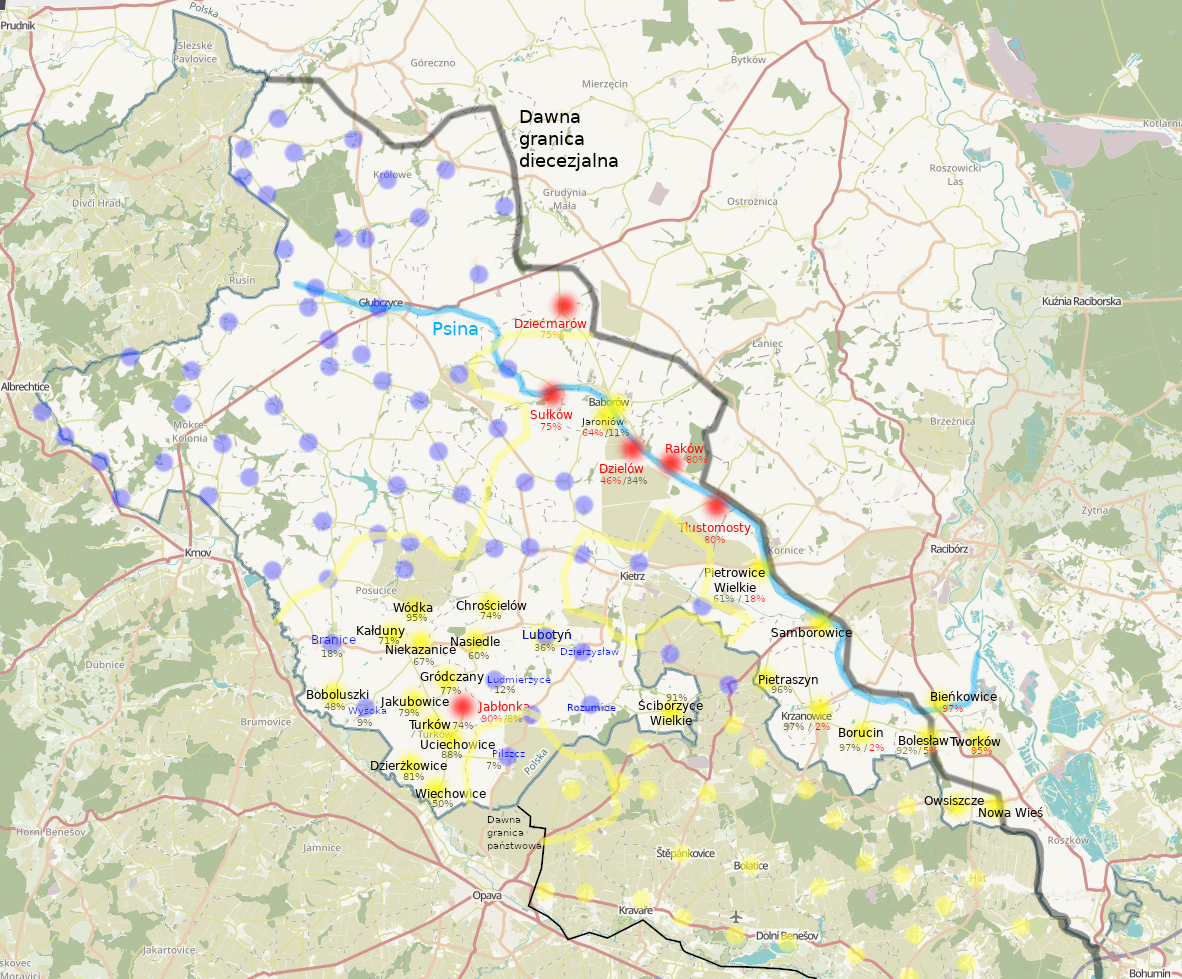
- Former Lach speaking places in modern-day Poland (yellow, percentage as of 1910)

The Lach dialects, also known as Lachian dialects (Czech: lašská nářečí, laština, Polish: gwary laskie, Silesian: Laszske narzecze), are a group of West Slavic dialects that form a transition between the Polish and Czech language. They are spoken in parts of Czech Silesia, the Hlučín Region, and northeastern Moravia, as well as in some adjacent villages in Poland.

Most Czech researchers consider Lach a dialect of Czech, whereas Polish dialectologists tend to ascribe Polish origins to Lach. Lachian is divided into numerous subdialects (Western, Eastern and Southern), it can therefore also be regarded as a dialect continuum, with limited mutual intelligibility between the eastern and western dialects. This dialectal differentiation is not typical for the Czech Republic, where there is a good deal of dialect leveling, especially in the west of the republic. Most Lachs, especially younger speakers, now speak standard Czech, and use it as a written language, while Lach remains the language of everyday speech. Lachian contains many German loanwords, according to some sources, up to 8% of the vocabulary.

The poet Óndra Łysohorsky is probably the best-known writer in Lachian. Łysohorsky was notable for refusing to write in Standard Czech, instead writing in the local dialect of Upper Silesia. In doing so, he contributed significantly to the development of the Lach literary language.

== Example text ==
Example text (Óndra Łysohorsky)
Lach	Silesian	Czech	Polish	English
Kaj noród mój? Pisany je mój wérš nocami. Joch był jak pes wyhnany w swět. Joch błudził wečer ulicami a społ jak chachar pod mostami, mój žiwot ňeznoł žodén kwět. Jo zatracény syn Ostrawy pro kořéň mjesta némjéł sém. Kus Polska tam, tu kus Morawy, tu buržuj Čech, tam Polok drawy. Kaj noród mój? Kaj lašsko zém?…	Kaj nacyjo moja? Pisany je mój wěrš nocami. Joch był jak pěs banowany w śwjot. Joch bamóncił bez wěčór štrasami ach społ jak chachar pod mostami, mój žywot ňy znoł žodnych blumów. Jo zapodźony syn Uostrawy kořéňów mjasta ňymjołch sam. Kónsek Polski tam, tu kónsek Morawy, tu buržój Čech, tam Polok hyrny. Kaj nacyjo moja? Kaj lašsko erda?	Kde je můj národ? Můj verš je psán nocemi. Byl jsem jako pes vyhnaný do světa. Toulal jsem se večer ulicemi a spal jako chachar pod mosty, můj život nepoznal žádný květ. Já, ztracený syn Ostravy, neměl jsem zde kořen tohoto místa. Kus Polska tam, tu kus Moravy, tu buržoazní Čech, tam povýšený Polák. Kde je můj národ? Kde je lašská země?	Gdzie jest mój naród? Mój wiersz jest pisany nocami. Byłem jak pies wygnany w świat. Błądziłem wieczorem ulicami i spałem jak chachar pod mostami, moje życie nie znało żadnego kwiatu. Ja, zatracony syn Ostrawy, nie miałem tu korzenia tego miejsca. Kawałek Polski tam, tu kawałek Moraw, tu bogaty Czech, tam wyniosły Polak. Gdzie jest mój naród? Gdzie jest ziemia laská?	Where is my nation? My verse is written through nights. I was like a dog pushed out into the world. I wandered the streets in the evening and slept like a tramp under the bridges, my life was known by no flower. I, the lost son of Ostrava, had no root of this place here. A bit of Poland there, here a bit of Moravia, here a bourgeois Czech, there a haughty Pole. Where is my nation? Where is the Lachian Land?

== See also ==
- Cieszyn Silesian dialect
- Lachian Dances
- Silesian language
- Sulkovian dialect
