= Texan Silesian =

Silesian variety of Texas, USA

- teksasko gwara
- Native to: United States
- Region: Panna Maria, Texas
- Ethnicity: Silesian Americans in Texas
- Native speakers: less than 96 (in 2000)
- Language family: Indo-European: Balto-Slavic; Slavic; West Slavic; Lechitic; Polish; Silesian; Texan Silesian

Language codes
- ISO 639-3: None (mis)
- Glottolog: sile1253
- Linguasphere: 53-AAA-cck, 53-AAA-dam
- IETF: szl-u-sd-ustx

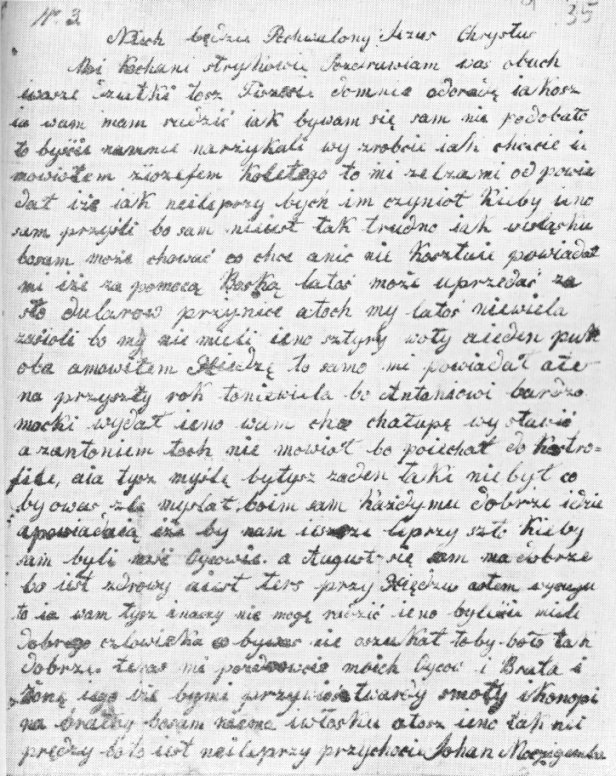
An example of Texan Silesian is a letter written from Texas to Poland in c. 1855. It is written in the standard Polish orthography of the time, with marked use of nasal vowels.

Location of Karnes County, Texas, where Texan Silesian is spoken

Texan Silesian (Note: Silesian: Steuer's Silesian alphabet: teksasko narzecz, Slabikorz Alphabet: teksaskŏ narzecz, literally: Texan subdialect) is a subdialect of the Silesian language used by descendants of immigrant Silesians in American settlements from 1852 to the present. The speakers of the dialect came to America from the area of Płużnica Wielka, Strzelce Opolskie and Toszek in Opolian Silesia. The dialect evolved around the area of the unincorporated community of Panna Maria in Karnes County, Texas which is considered by the Texas State Historical Association "the oldest permanent Polish settlement in America and as the home of the nation's oldest Polish church and school." Another significant settlement in which Texan Silesian is present is neighboring Cestohowa.

Texan Silesian is substantially less influenced by German because its speakers emigrated before the Kulturkampf, a government campaign of Germanization enacted by the German Empire, which added many Germanisms to the Silesian dialect within said country's pre-1914 state borders. The language is kept alive by its current speakers, but they know it only in its spoken form. Texan Silesian has not been replaced by English as a spoken language by the older generations of the Panna Maria area, because the local Silesian Polish community was historically strongly isolated. Nevertheless, Texan Silesian has adopted some words from English.

One of the characteristic features of Texan Silesian phonetics is called mazuration, a widespread linguistic process within the Polish language, especially extant in rural areas, in which postalveolar fricatives and affricates (Polish cz, sz, ż, dż) are pronounced [t͡s, s, z, d͡z], whereas in the Silesian dialect of the Katowice urban area they are pronounced [t͡ʂ, ʂ, ʐ, d͡ʐ]. Mazuration was already present in Texan Silesian. Another phonetic peculiarity of the dialect is its more recent denasalization. For example, the nasal vowel [ɛ̃], still common in modern Polish and present in Texan Silesian of the 19th century, became the oral vowel [ɛ] or diphone [an], differing from most other Silesian dialects, in which denasalization of [ɛ̃] produced the diphone [ɨn]. This might suggest that Texan Silesian split from other Silesian dialects before the denasalization process began. A visible product of these language changes is the name of the settlement of Cestohowa. Its name is derived from Częstochowa, a city of large religious importance within Poland, but, due to the phonetic processes mentioned above, cz was written as c, while ę was written as e.

== Sample text ==
1855 Letter from Texas to Poland.

Moi Kochani strykowie. Pozdrawiam was obuch iwasze dziatki tosz Piszecie domnie odoradę iakosz ia wam mam radzić iak bywam się sam nie podobało to byśćie namnie narżykali wy zrobicie iak chcecie ia mowiołem ziozefem koletego to mi zelzami od powiadał iże iak neilepszy bych im czynioł kieby ieno sam przyśli bo sam nieiest tak trudno iak wesląsku bosam może chować co chce anic nie kosztuie powiadał mi iże za pomocą Boską latoś może uprzedać za sto dularow przynice atoch my latoś niewiela zaśioli bo my nie mieli ieno sztyry woły aieden puk oba amowiłem Xiedzę to samo mi powiadał ale na przyszły rok toniewiela bo Antoniowi bardzo mocki wydał ieno wam chce chałupę wy stawić a zantoniem toch nie mowioł bo poiechał do Kastrofile, aia tysz myślę bytysz zaden taki niebył co by owas zle myslał boim sam każdymu dobrze idzie apowiadaią iże by nam ieszcze lepszy szło kieby sam byli naśi Oycowie, a August się sam dobrze bo iest zdrowy aiest ters przy Xiędzu aotem wycugu to ia wam tysz inaczy nie mogę radzić ieno byleśćie mieli dobrego człowieka co bywas nie oszukał toby boło tak dobrze. teras mi pozdrowcie moich Oycow i Brata i Żonę iego iże bymi przywioś twardy smoły ikonopi na bratwy bosam niema iwłosku atosz ieno iak nei prędzy boto iest nailepszy przychocie Johan Moczigemba

== Typical words unlike Silesian in Poland ==
| Texas Silesian | Central Silesian | Polish | English |
|---|---|---|---|
| turbacyjŏ | starość, utropa | trudność, problem | problem |
| zaszanować | zaszporować | oszczędzać | to save money |
| kapudrŏk | zalōnik | surdut | frock coat |
| furgŏcz | fliger | samolot | aeroplane |
| szczyrkowa | szczyrkocz, klaperszlanga | grzechotnik | rattlesnake |
| po warszawsku | po gorolsku | po polsku, po ogólnopolsku | in (standard) Polish |
| prastarzik | starzik, ōpa | pradziadek | great-grandfather |
| cieżko | fest | bardzo | very |
| kole tego | ô tym, kole tego | o tym | about that |
| pokłŏd | gipsdeka | sufit | ceiling |
| bejbik | bajtel | dzieciak | baby |
| kara | auto | auto | car |
| wiater | luft | wiatr | air |
| korn | kukurzica | kukurydza | corn |
| farmiyrz | gospodorz | rolnik, gospodarz | farmer |
| plōmzy, piczesy | fyrzichy | brzoskwinie | peaches |
| garce | bōncloki, garki, gorce | garnki | pots |
