= Sułków, Opole Voivodeship =

Sułków
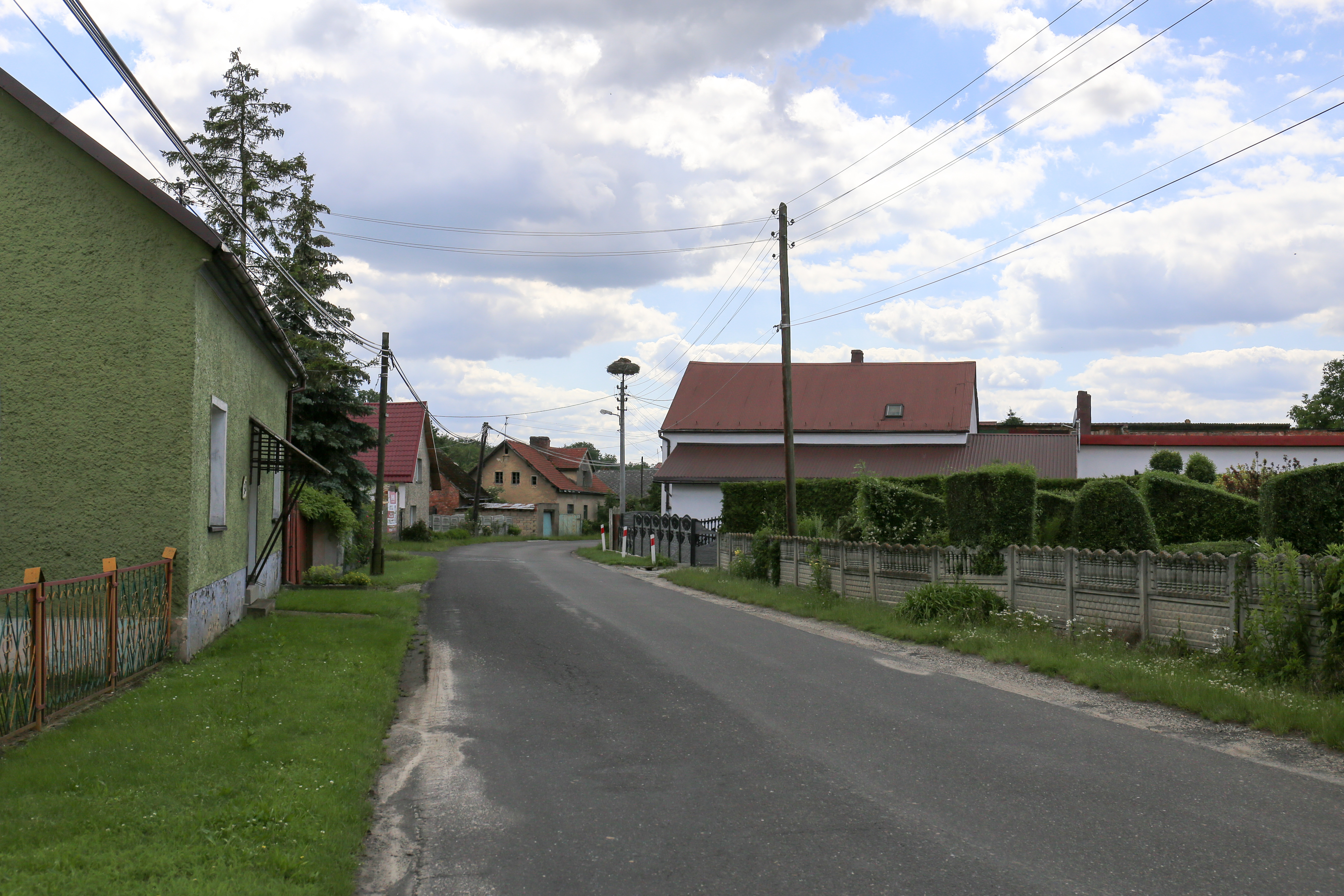

- Location within Poland
- Coordinates: 50°9′47″N 17°57′9″E
- Country: Poland
- Voivodeship: Opole
- County: Głubczyce
- Gmina: Baborów
- First mentioned: 1340
- Time zone: UTC+1 (CET)
  - Summer (DST): UTC+2 (CEST)
- Area code: +48 77
- Car plates: OGL

Sułków [ˈsuwkuf] is a village in south-western Poland, in Opole Voivodeship, Głubczyce County, Gmina Baborów.

The name of the village comes from the Old Polish male name Sulisław. The oldest known mention of the village dates back to 1340, when it was purchased by Euphemia of Racibórz, local Polish princess of the Piast dynasty. From the unification of Germany in 1871 until 1945, it was part of the German Empire and later Nazi Germany, however, in the late 19th century the local population was entirely Polish and predominantly Catholic. In 1936 the German administration changed the name to Zinnatal to erase traces of Polish origin. The original Polish name was restored after the village became once again part of Poland after the defeat of Nazi Germany in World War II.

== Notable people ==
- Feliks Steuer (1889–1950), Polish linguist, born in the village
