= Śmiergust =

Polish folk custom

A video documenting the śmiergust in Wilamowice in 2015

Śmiergust is a long-standing folk custom popular in some parts of Poland, particularly in and around the town of Wilamowice. It involves young men, often in costume, dousing young unmarried women with water. The celebrations take place on the Market Square of Wilamowice on Wet Monday (Easter Monday), and in or near the women's homes on Easter Sunday. The traditions of Śmigus-dyngus, known in the Polish diaspora as Dyngus Day, include the water dousing element.

== Historical outline ==
Traditionally, at Śmiergust, groups of dressed-up men walk from house to house, visiting homes and dousing girls with water. The custom is sometimes observed on Easter Sunday – mostly in the area surrounding Oświęcim; specific locations include Kozy and Wilamowice. The custom was first published by Józef Latosiński in his 1909 book entitled Monografia miasteczka Wilamowice (The Town of Wilamowice – A Monograph), describing it as a cross-dressing festival: "(...) On the second day of Easter, in the afternoon, young men dress up as girls and adult girls as men. Some of them wear masks; they visit houses, play accordion music and douse passers-by with water; this procession is called "smirgust" (...)".

== The ritual and participants ==
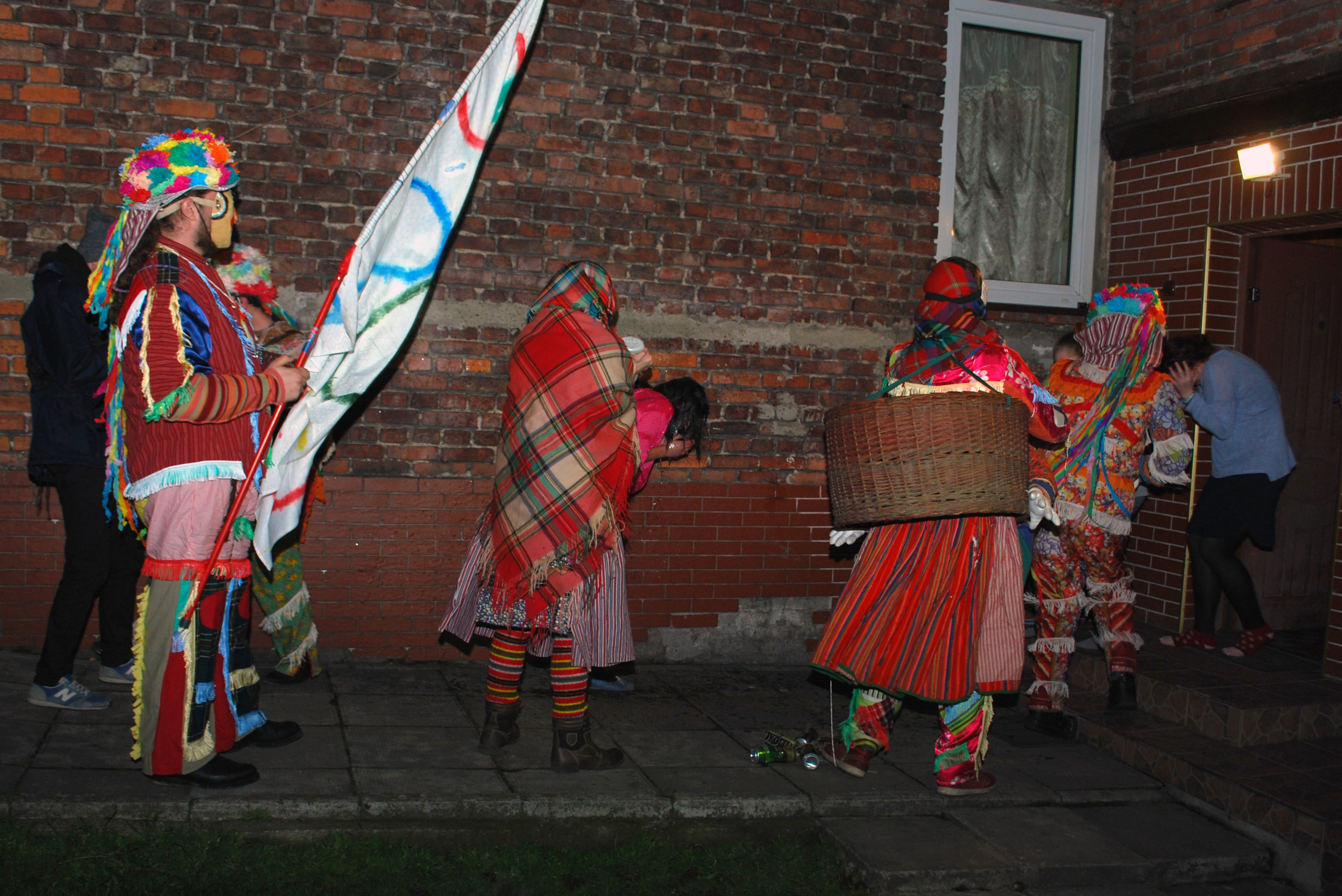
Śmiergustnicy dousing water on a girl in front of her house.

The participants of Śmiergust have dressed up as various characters: "(...) doctors, Jews, chimney sweeps, cart drivers or (...) women. At a certain point they began creating their costumes from patches of old items of women's clothing, which resulted in a colourful, motley effect". They also wear hats decorated with crepe flowers which symbolise the coming spring, as well as hand-painted paper-mâché masks, worn to conceal the owner's identity.

The Śmiergust group is made up form young men (aged 16–25), who walk from house to house throughout the night and – after dousing girls with water – receive food and drinks. Jolanta Danek, an ethnographer living in Wilamowice, recalls that "(...) on Sunday evening the men gather in a house of one of the participants." The group usually includes an accordion player, who accompanies the conduct on Easter Sunday and Monday.

Śmiergust characters "walk into every house in which a single young woman can be found. Quite often they have an opportunity to visit a home they wouldn't dare enter otherwise. They douse girls with water, dance and sing." The women on whom a lot of water has been poured during Śmiergust could be certain of their popularity and – possibly – marriage.

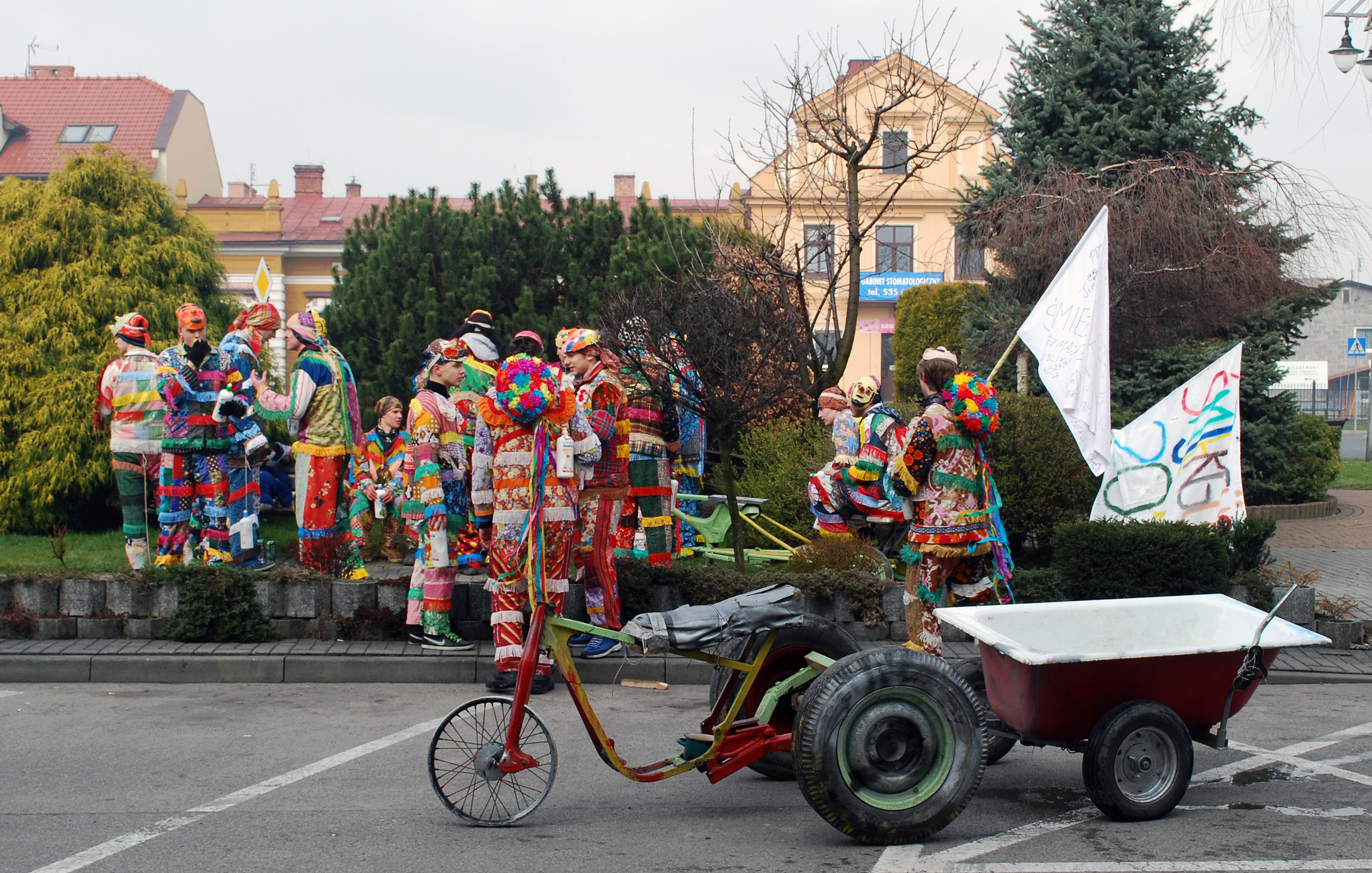
A group of Śmiergust participants with a bath on wheels filled with water; Wilamowice, Poland

Józef Gara wrote in his poem titled "Dy Wymysöjer Śmiergüśnika" (Wymysorys for 'Śmiergusters of Wilamowice')): "(...) Śmiergust boys have to know and take care / not to miss a house where girls live / not to upset a girl (...)".

Śmiergust participants continue dousing people with water on Easter Monday. They gather on the market square and when the women leave the church, they are caught and doused with water. The characters also stage impromptu shows and play tricks on their hosts (such as carrying a cart onto a barn's roof). The arrival of Śmiergust men is announced by the noise of dragged cans, whistles, trumpets and the ensuing singing and music. The noise and music perform a symbolic function – to awaken "the sleeping life of nature".

== Forgotten tradition ==
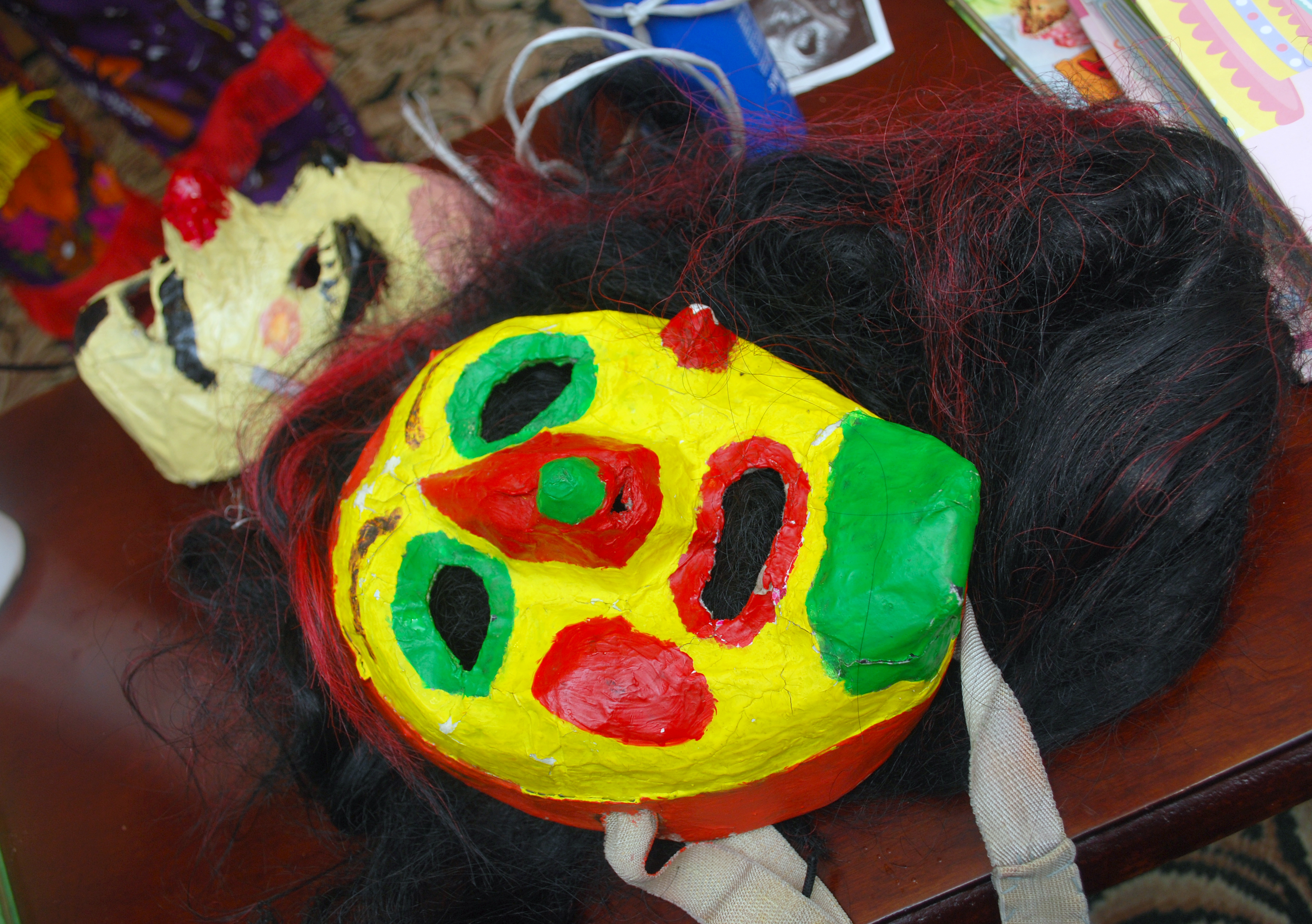
Mask used by Śmiergust participant

Two elements of the Easter customs in Wilamowice – or with the participants' costumes – are no longer practised.

The custom of dousing with water was supposed to bring good fortune and luck to the young women. Sources mention that on Easter Monday it was customary to support the hopes of a good harvest: "(...) On Palm Sunday they bless Easter palms, which they later keep in houses, stuck under the roof. From these palms they then fashion crosses, and on Easter Monday place those crosses in the fields, so that the Lord allows a good harvest. This custom is called "holy śmirgust".

In Wilamowice, Śmiergust costumes used to be worn on the third day of a wedding: "(...) Best men and bridesmaids, as well as other young guests, would dress up on the last day of the wedding – men as women, women as men, best men as the bridegroom, etc.; they would hide behind indistinguishable make-up and travel around on decked-out carts, play music, and join a second round of celebrations. They collected bottles of spirits in their baskets or even snatch a hen and then gift it to the young couple for good luck(...)".

The custom is also kept alive by folklore groups: the group Wilamowice-Fil performs "A Wedding in Wilamowice", "Pastorale" and "Śmiergust". Jolanta Danek, director of the folklore group, told the local press: "(...) boys from neighbouring villages join with ours in the procession and together they actively participate in the event. It is always an opportunity to meet an interesting girl (...)".

== See also ==
- Śmigus-dyngus
