= Vilamovians =

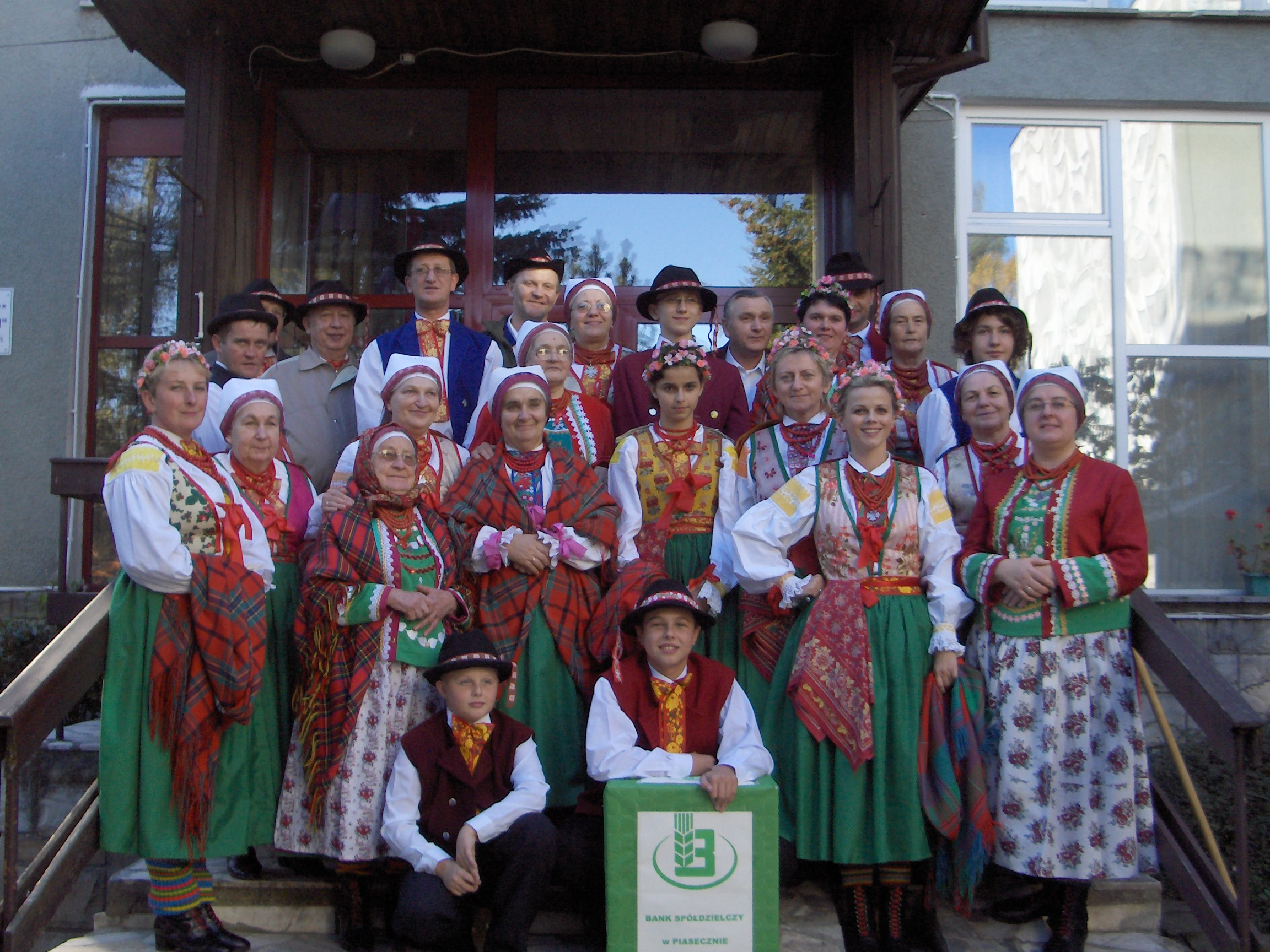
- Vilamovians in traditional costumes, Wilamowice, Poland

Regions with significant populations
- Poland (Bielsko County, Silesian Voivodeship)

Languages
- Wymysorys, Polish (Kraków dialect), Silesian

Religion
- Roman Catholic

Related ethnic groups
- Halcnovians, Flemings, Germans, Poles, Silesians

Vilamovians (Note: Wymysorys: Wymysiöejyn; German: Wilmesauer; Silesian: Wilamowiany; Polish: Wilamowianie ([vilamɔˈvjaɲɛ].) are a Germanic-speaking ethnic group in Poland, living in the town of Wilamowice near Bielsko-Biała, who speak the Wymysorys language and maintain their own folk costumes and traditions.

== History ==
During the Mongol invasion of Europe, the area was left depopulated and was subsequently settled by German, Scottish and Flemish settlers. Over time the Flemish and Scottish settlers in the region were assimilated, with the exception of Wilamowice. Vilamovians' traditions say they are descendants of immigrants from County of Flanders.

After World War II, Vilamovians were harshly persecuted in the Polish People's Republic, since they were regarded as Germans. Their language and costumes were banned in 1946. Some of them were moved to "Recovered Territories". A considerable number of representatives of this group live in Austria.

As of 2018 about 300 people in the community could understand the Wymysorys language and approximately 60 people had the ability to speak it.

== Notable Vilamovians ==
- Józef Bilczewski (1860–1923), Archbishop of Lviv
- Florian Biesik (1849–1926), linguist
- Józef Gara (1929–2013), poet
- Jan Gawiński (c. 1622–c. 1684), poet

== See also ==
- Ethnic minorities in Poland
- Silingi
