= Florian Biesik =

Austrian linguist

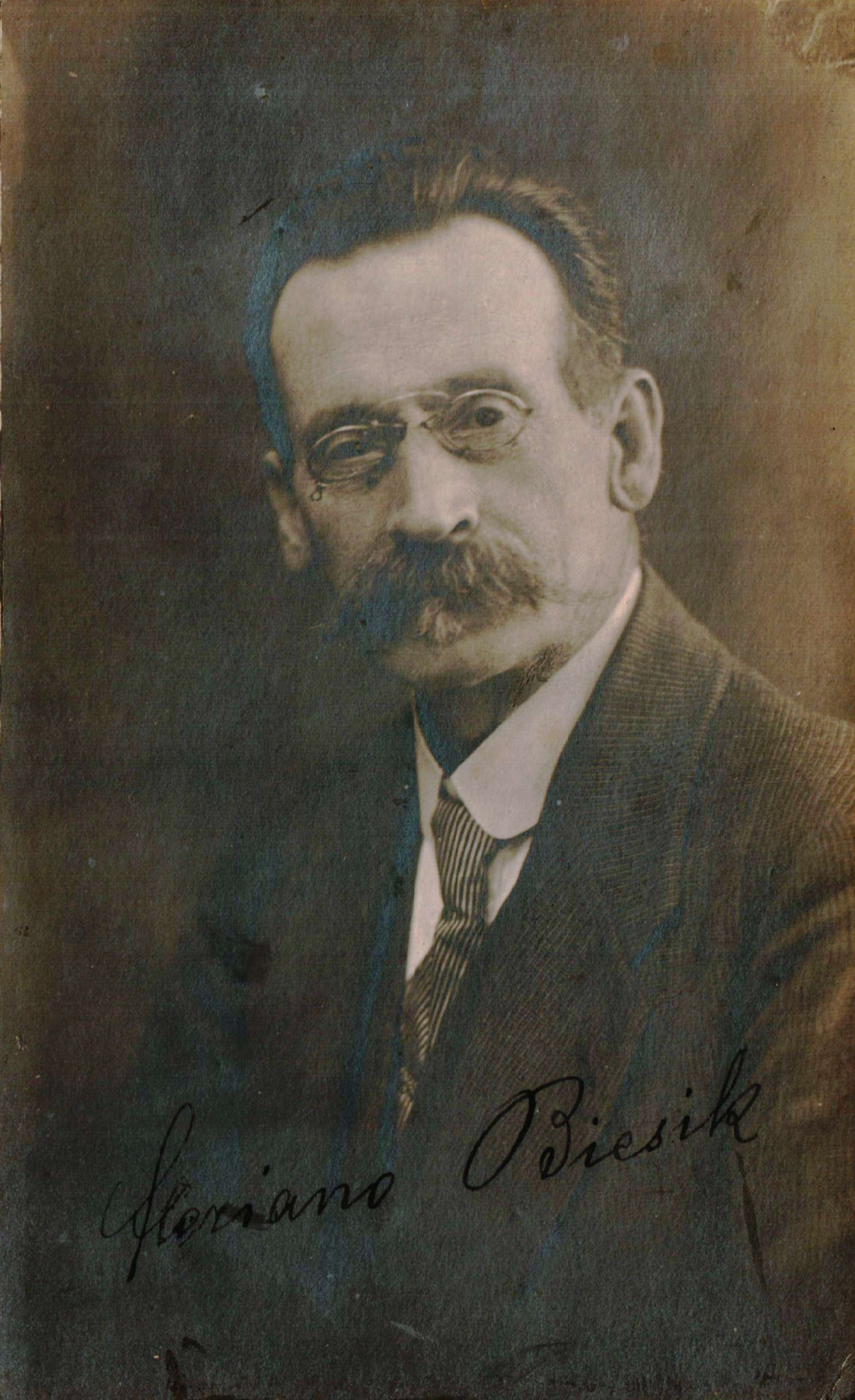
A picture of Florian Biesik

Florian Biesik (March 4, 1849 in Wilamowice – March 13, 1926 in Trieste) was an Austro-Hungarian civil servant and linguist. He created a literary standard for the Germanic langugae Vilamovian, trying to prove it did not derive from German, but possibly Frisian, Anglo-Saxon or Dutch.

An Austro-Hungarian civil servant, he was sent to the Adriatic port of Trieste, where he spent most of his professional life as the director of the local post office. After retiring, he moved to the village of Aurisina near the coastal resort of Duino, where he frequented the cultural circles of the local Slovene community.
