= Wymysorys =

West Germanic language spoken in Wilamowice, Poland

- Vilamovian
- Wymysiöeryś
- Pronunciation: [vɨmɨˈsʲøːrɪɕ]
- Native to: Poland
- Region: Wilamowice, Silesian Voivodeship, Poland
- Ethnicity: Vilamovians
- Native speakers: 20 (2017)
- Language family: Indo-European: Germanic; West Germanic; Weser-Rhine Germanic; (High German); Central German; East Central German; Schlesisch–Wilmesau; Bielsko-Biała; Wymysorys
- Early forms: Proto-Indo-European: Proto-Germanic; Old Thuringian
- Writing system: Latin

Language codes
- ISO 639-3: wym
- Glottolog: wymy1235
- Wymysorys is classified as Critically Endangered by the UNESCO Atlas of the World's Languages in Danger

- Location within Silesian Voivodeship Location within Poland
- Coordinates: 49.92°N 19.15°E

Wymysorys (Wymysiöeryś, pronounced [vɨmɨˈsʲøːrɪɕ, vɨmɨˈɕœ̯ɛrɪɕ]; German: Wilmesaurisch), also known as Vilamovian, Wilamowicean, or Wilmesaurisch, is a West Germanic language spoken by the Vilamovian ethnic minority in the town of Wilamowice, Silesian Voivodeship, Poland (Wymysoü in Wymysorys), on the border between Silesia and Lesser Poland, near Bielsko-Biała. It is considered an endangered language, possibly the most so of any of the Germanic languages. There are probably fewer than 20 native users of Wymysorys, virtually all bilingual; the majority are elderly.

The status of Wymysorys is complex as, genealogically, it belongs to the East Central dialect group of High German, though based on the self-identification of its users as a group separate from the Germans and the existence of a literary language, it can be considered a separate language.

It belongs to the dialect group of the former Bielsko-Biała language island, which includes the Alzenau dialect.

== History ==
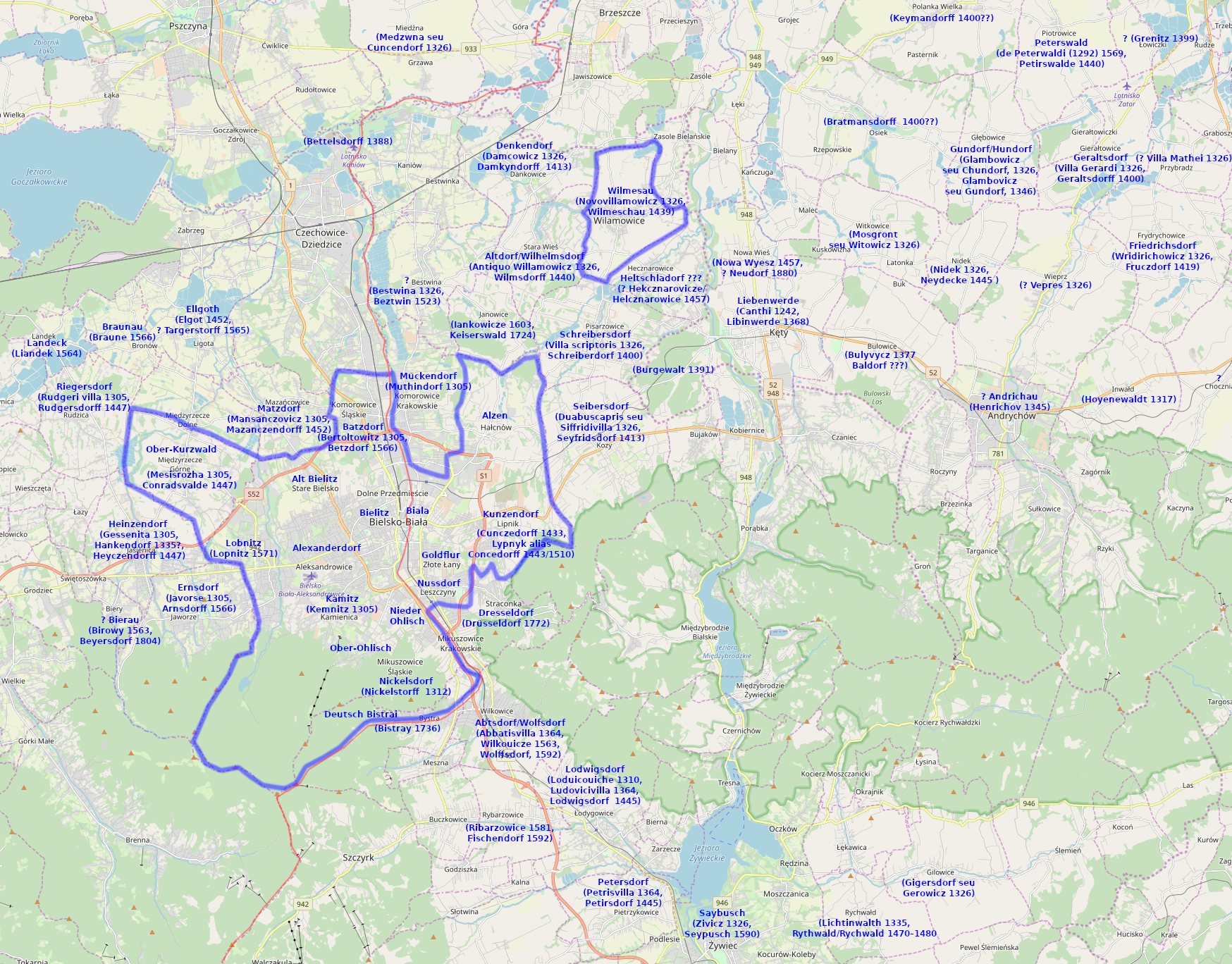
Bielsko-Biała German language island before WW2 (blue line), with some possible Walddeutsche settlements from the Middle Ages and later.

Most scholars consider Wymysorys to derive from 12th-century Middle High German, with a strong influence from Polish. The inhabitants of Wilamowice are thought to be descendants of German, Flemish and Scottish settlers who arrived in Poland during the 13th century. Many of the inhabitants claim that they are descended from the people of Flanders, Friesland, and Holland, with others claiming to be descended from the Anglo-Saxons. Although historically derived from the German dialect continuum, Wymysorys is not mutually intelligible with Standard German. Unlike in other West Germanic enclave communities in Polish-speaking territory, where closely related dialects (e.g. Halcnovian) were spoken, Wymysorys speakers did not self-identify as Germans and used Polish, not German, as a Dachsprache.

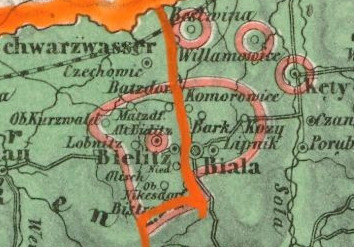
Wymysorys on a map from 1855

Wymysorys was the vernacular language of Wilamowice until World War II. However, it seems it has been in decline since the late 19th century. In 1880 as many as 92% of the town's inhabitants spoke Wymysorys (1,525 out of 1,662 people), in 1890 – only 72%, in 1900 – 67%, in 1910 – 73% again. Although Wymysorys was taught in local schools (under the name of "local variety of German"), since 1875 the basic language of instruction in most schools in Austro-Hungarian Galicia was Polish. During World War II and the German occupation of Poland, Wymysorys was openly promoted by the Nazi administration, but after the war the tables turned: local communist authorities forbade the use of Wymysorys in any form. The widespread bilingualism of the people saved most local residents from being forcibly resettled to Germany, but many of them stopped teaching their children their language or even using it in daily life. Although the ban was lifted after 1956, Wymysorys has been gradually replaced by Polish, especially among the younger generation. Most of the inhabitants have the same surnames (Mozler, Rozner, Figwer, Biba, Foks, Sznajder), which led to the use of nicknames (Fliöer-Fliöer, Hȧla-Mockja, i.e. Florian, son of Florian or Maciej, son of Elżbieta).

Nowadays, as part of saving the Wymysorys culture, new songs and lyrics are written in this language. The play Hobbit. Hejn ȧn cyryk was written in Wymysorys, based on the prose of J. R. R. Tolkien, and was staged, among others, at the Polish Theatre in Warsaw in February 2016.

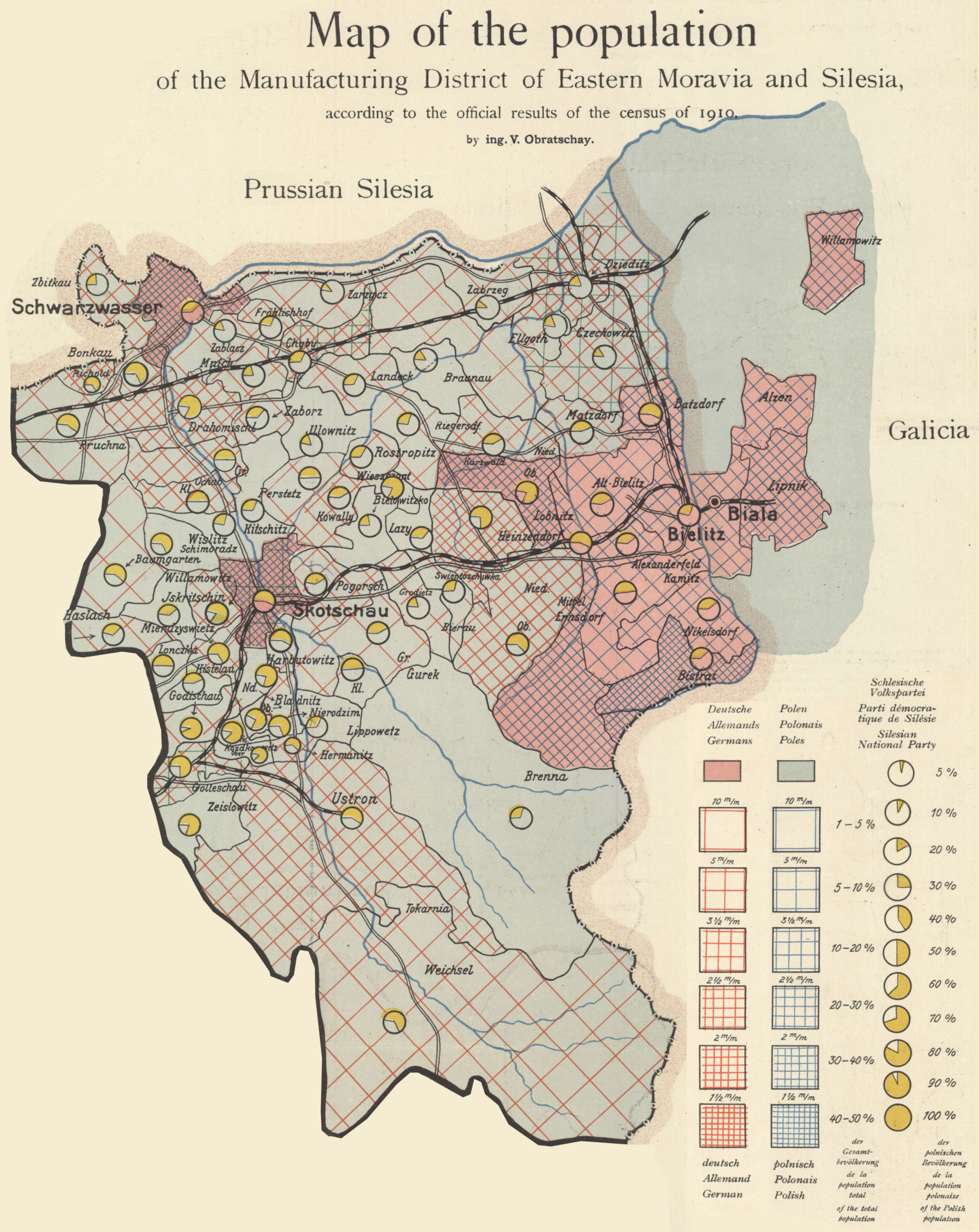
1910 census map identifying Wilamowice as a majority ethnic German settlement.

Acting on a proposal by Tymoteusz Król, the Library of Congress added the Wymysorys language to the register of languages on 18 July 2007. It was also registered in the International Organization for Standardization, where it received the wym ISO 639-3 code. In a 2009 UNESCO report Wymysorys has been reported as "severely endangered" and nearly extinct.

Members of the Wikimedia Polska association were also involved in saving this dying language. As part of the "Wilamowice" project, Wymysorys words read by Józef Gara were recorded, and the Wymysorys dictionary in Wiktionary was supplemented (in 2018, the dictionary consisted of over 7,000 words).

== Revitalisation ==
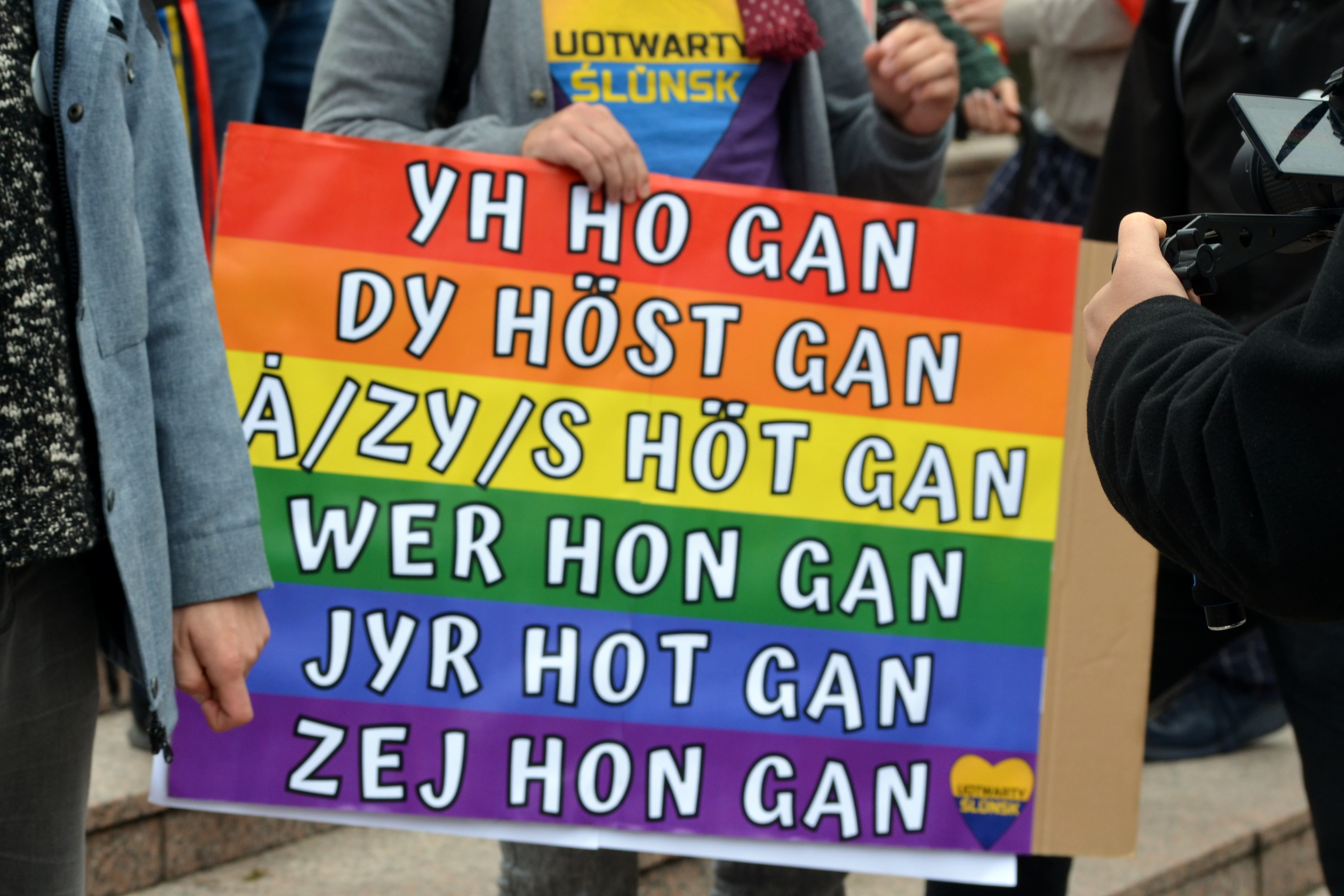
A banner at Bielsko-Biała Equality March 2021 with the conjugation of the word to love in Wymysorys

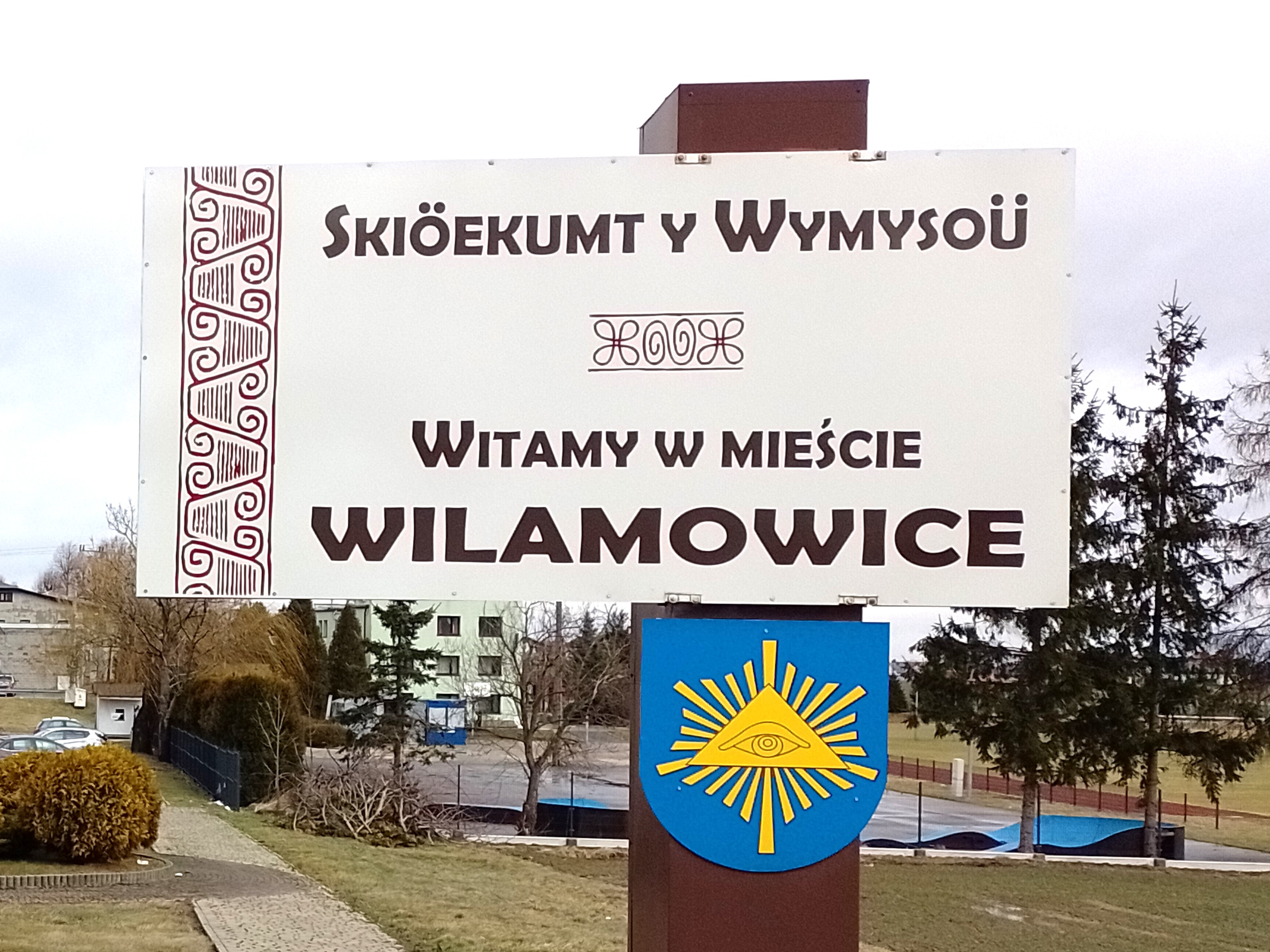
The 'Welcome to Wilamowice' in Wymysorys and Polish

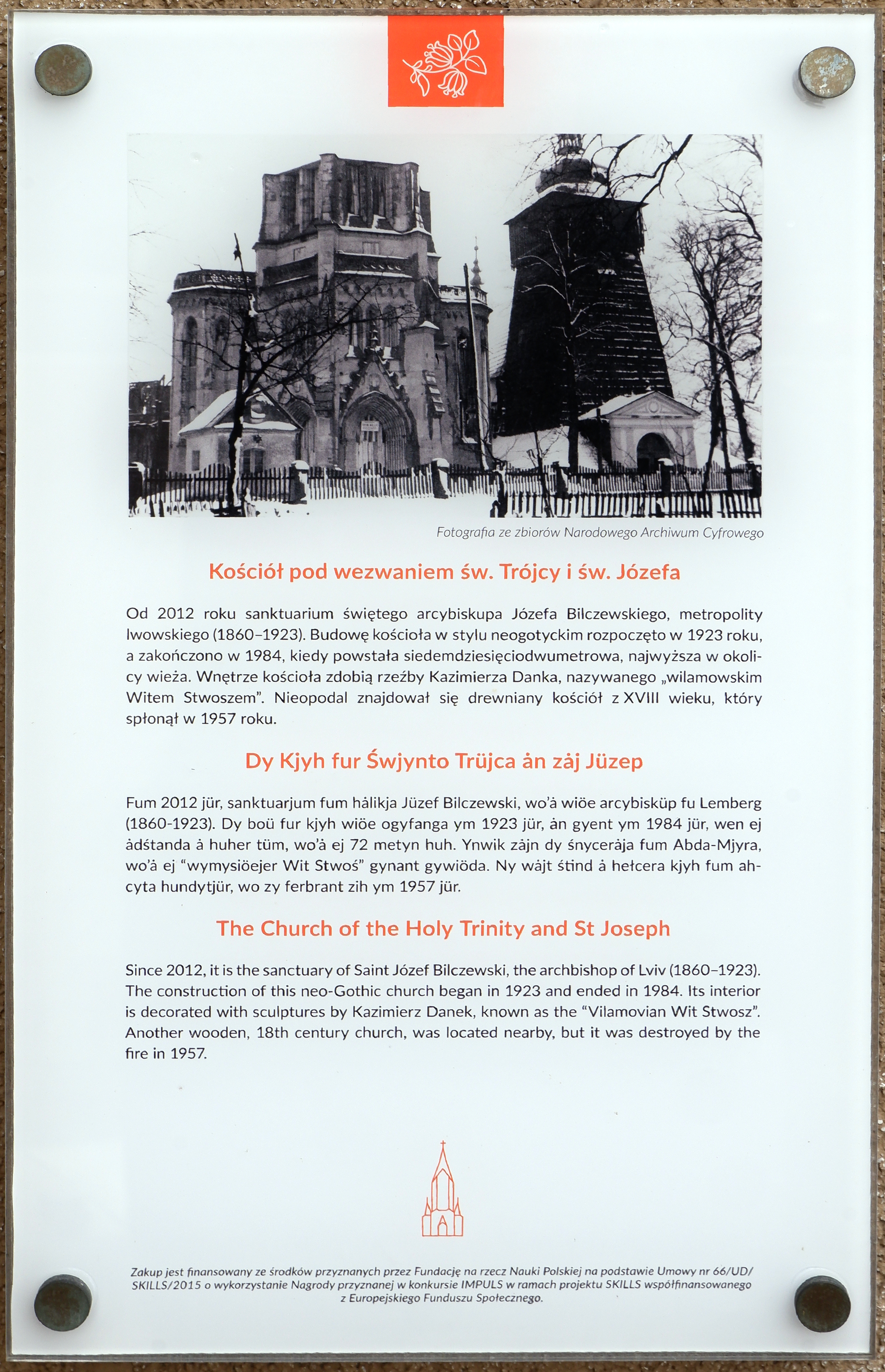
Information about the local church in Polish, Wymysorys and English

Some new revitalisation efforts were started in the first decade of the 21st century, led by speaker Tymoteusz Król, whose efforts include private lessons with a group of pupils as well as compiling language records, standardising written orthography and compiling the first ever dictionary of Wymysorys. Additionally, a new project called The Wymysiöeryśy Akademyj – Accademia Wilamowicziana or WA-AW was established under the "Artes Liberales" program at the University of Warsaw with the intention of creating a unified scholastic body for the study of the Wymysorys language.

== Phonology ==
=== Consonants ===
		Labial	Alveolar	Post- alveolar		Alveolo- palatal	Palatal	Velar	Glottal
		Labial	Alveolar	ret.	pal.	Alveolo- palatal	Palatal	Velar	Glottal
Nasal		m	n			ɲ̟		ŋ	
Stop	voiceless	p	t				c	k	
Stop	voiced	b	d				ɟ	ɡ	
Affricate	voiceless		t͡s	(t̠͡s̠)	t͡ʃ	t͡ɕ			
Affricate	voiced		(d͡z)	(d̠͡z̠)	(d͡ʒ)	(d͡ʑ)			
Fricative	voiceless	f	s	(s̠)	ʃ	ɕ	(ç)	x	h
Fricative	voiced	v	z	(z̠)	ʒ	ʑ			
Trill			r						
Lateral			l						
Approximant		w					j		

- Voiced stops, sibilant fricatives and affricates are regularly devoiced or voiceless in final position.
- The sounds of /x/ and /h/ are interchangeable among different speakers. The use of [x] is typically heard at the beginning of a word, possibly due to the influence of Polish, even though historically in Germanic languages, the glottal fricative [h] is typically heard.
- The series of palato-alveolar /ʃ, ʒ, t͡ʃ/ and alveolo-palatal /ɕ, ʑ, t͡ɕ/ fricative and affricate sounds, are heard interchangeably among various speakers.
- [ç] is heard in word-final position, as an allophone of /x/.
- The voiced affricates /d͡z, d̠͡z̠, d͡ʒ, d͡ʑ/ are only heard in Polish loanwords.
- A series of flat post-alveolar sibilants and affricates [s̠, z̠, t̠͡s̠, d̠͡z̠], are also heard in Polish loanwords, interchangeably with alveolar-palatal sounds /ɕ, ʑ, t͡ɕ, d͡ʑ/.
- The labial-velar approximant /w/ is pronounced with a lesser degree of lip rounding than in English, and is more similar to the Polish pronunciation of ł [w].

=== Vowels ===
	Front		Central		Back
Close	i	y	(ɨ)	(ʉ)	u
Near-close	ɪ	ʏ			
Close-mid	e	ø	ɘ		o
Mid			ə		
Open-mid	ɛ	œ			ɔ
Open			a		ɑ

- The close-mid sound /ɘ/ is phonetically more fronted as [ɘ̟].
- Mid central vowel sounds /ɘ, ə/ are also heard close central sounds [ɨ, ʉ], among speakers.

Diphthongs
	Front	Front	Back
	ascending	descending	
Close	i̯ø		
Close-mid	ɪ̯ɘ̟	ei̯	
Open-mid		œʏ̯	ɔi̯
Open		ai̯	
Triphthong	ʏ̯øœ̯		

== Alphabet ==
Wymysorys has been for centuries mostly a spoken language. It was not until the times of Florian Biesik, the first author of major literary works in the language, that a need for a separate version of a Latin alphabet arose. Biesik wrote most of his works in plain Polish alphabet, which he considered better-suited for the phonetics of his language. In recent times Józef Gara (1929–2013), another author of works in the local language, devised a distinct Wymysorys alphabet, consisting of 34 letters derived from the Latin script and mostly based on Polish as well:

Wymysorys alphabet
Majuscule forms (also called uppercase or capital letters)
A	Ȧ	B	C	Ć	D	Dz	Dź	E	F	G	H	I	J	K	Ł	L	M	N	Ń	O	Ö	P	R	S	Ś	T	U	Ü	W	X	Y	Z	Ź	Ż
Minuscule forms (also called lowercase or small letters)
a	ȧ	b	c	ć	d	dz	dź	e	f	g	h	i	j	k	ł	l	m	n	ń	o	ö	p	r	s	ś	t	u	ü	w	x	y	z	ź	ż
IPA
ɑ	a	b	ts	ts̠, tʃ, tɕ	d	dz	dz̠, dʒ, dʑ	e, ɛ	f	ɡ	h, x	i, ɪ	j	k	w	l	m	n	nʲ	o, ɔ	ø	p	r	s	s̠, ʃ, ɕ	t	u	y, ʏ	v	-	ɘ̟, ə	z	ʒ, ʑ	z̠, ʒ

== Example words and their relationship to other languages ==
A sample of Wymysorys words with German, Dutch and English translations. Note that ł is read in Wymysorys like English w (as in Polish), and w like v (as in Polish and German):

English	Wymysorys	Middle High German	Standard High German	Dutch	Frisian	Comment
alone	ałan	alein(e)	allein	alleen	allinne	
and	ana, an	und(e), unt	und	en	en	
bridge	bryk	brücke, brucke	Brücke	brug	brêge	
dolt	duł	tol, dol 'foolish, nonsensical'	toll 'mad, fantastic, wonderful'	dol 'crazy'	dol 'furious'	
hear	fulgia	volgen	hören	horen	folgje	< Frisian; cf. WFris. folgje, EFris foulgje 'to follow'. cf. German folgen, Dutch volgen 'to follow'
wholly	ganc	ganz	ganz	gans	gâns	
court	gyrycht	geriht	Gericht	gerecht	rjocht	cf. German Recht, Dutch recht '(legal) right', English right)
dog	hund	hunt	Hund	hond	hûn	cf. English hound
heaven	hymuł	himel	Himmel	hemel	himel	
love	łiwa	liebe	Liebe	liefde	leafde	
a bit	a mikieła	michel 'much'	ein bisschen	een beetje	in bytsje	Scots mickle, English much; antonymic switch 'much' → 'little'
mother	müter	muoter	Mutter	moeder	mem	
middle	mytuł	mittel	Mitte	middel	midden/mid	
no one	nimanda	nieman	niemand	niemand	nimmen	
no	ny	ne, ni	nein	nee(n)	nee	
picture	obrozła	--	Bild	beeld	byld	< Slavic; cf. Polish obraz
breath	ödum	Middle German ādem	Atem	adem	azem	cf. archaic/poetic German Odem, Central Franconian Öödem
elephant	olifant	elefant	Elefant	olifant	oaljefant	< Dutch
evening	öwyt	ābent	Abend	avond	jûn	
welcome	sgiöekumt	wil(le)kōme(n)	wilkommen	welkom	wolkom	
write	śrajwa	schrīben	schreiben	schrijven	skriuwe	
stone	śtaen	stein	Stein	steen	stien	
sister	syster	swester	Schwester	zuster	suster	
drink	trynkia	trinken	trinken	drinken	drinke	
world	wełt	werlt	Welt	wereld	wrâld	
winter	wynter	winter	Winter	winter	winter	
seven	zyjwa	Middle German siven	sieben	zeven	sân	
silver	zyłwer	silber	Silber	zilver	sulver	

== Sample texts ==
Lord's Prayer in Wymysorys

Ynzer Foter

Ynzer Foter, dü byst ym hymuł,
Daj noma zuł zajn gywajt;
Daj Kyngrajch zuł dö kuma;
Daj wyła zuł zajn ym hymuł an uf der aot;
dos ynzer gywynłichys brut go yns hojt;
an fercaj yns ynzer siułda,
wi wir oj fercajn y ynzyn siułdigia;
ny łat yns cyn zynda;
zunder konst yns reta fum nistgüta.
[Do Dajs ej z Kyngrajch an dy mocht, ans łowa uf inda.]
Amen

Our Father; English translation

Our Father, thou beest in heaven,
Thy name shall be hallowed;
Thy kingdom shall come here;
Thy will shall be in heaven and on earth;
give our daily bread to us today;
and forgive us our debts/sins,
as we, too, forgive our debtors/sinners;
don't lead us to sin;
but save us from evil.
[For Thine is the kingdom and the power and the glory forever.]
Amen.

A lullaby in Wymysorys with English translation:

Śłöf maj buwła fest!
Skumma fremdy gest,
Skumma muma ana fettyn,
Z' brennia nysła ana epułn,
Śłöf maj Jasiu fest!

Sleep, my boy, soundly!
Foreign guests are coming,
Aunts and uncles are coming,
Bringing nuts and apples,
Sleep, my Johnny, soundly!

== See also ==
- Alzenau dialect
- Silesian language
- Silesian German
- Vilamovians

== General and cited references ==
- Wicherkiewicz, Tomasz (2003). The Making of a Language: The Case of the Idiom of Wilamowice, Southern Poland. Berlin: De Gruyter. ISBN 9783110170993. OCLC 811407652.
- Andrason, Alexander. Complexity of endangered minority languages: The sound system of Wymysiöeryś. Coler, Matt, and Andrew Nevins, eds. Contemporary research in minoritized and diaspora languages of Europe, p. 213-260. Vol. 6. Language Science Press, 2023. Open Access online.
- Andrason, Alexander (2016), "Where Germanic and Slavic Meet – New Polish-based Tenses in the Vilamovicean Language" (PDF), Germanoslavica, 27 (1), Institute of Slavonic Studies of the Academy of Sciences of the Czech Republic and Euroslavica: 1–17, ISSN 1210-9029
- Andrason, Alexander; Król, Tymoteusz (2016), A Grammar of Wymysorys (PDF), Slavic and East European Resource Center, Durham, North Carolina: Duke University
- Andrason, Alexander (2015), Willim, Ewa; Urban, Mateusz (eds.), "Vilamovicean – A Germanic-Slavic Mixed Language?" (PDF), Faculty of Arts and Social Sciences, Studies in Polish Linguistics, 10 (2), Stellenbosch, South Africa: Stellenbosch University: 57–85, doi:10.4467/23005920SPL.15.003.3560, ISSN 1732-8160
- Lasatowicz, Maria Katarzyna [in German] (1992). Die deutsche Mundart von Wilamowice zwischen 1920 und 1987 [The German dialect of Wilamowice between 1920 and 1987]. Higher Pedagogical School of Silesian Insurgents in Opole (in German). Opole: University of Opole. ISBN 9788385012948.
- Mojmir, Hermann [in German] (1930–1936), Wörterbuch der deutschen Mundart von Wilamowice [Dictionary of the German dialect of Wilamowice] (in German), Kraków: Polish Academy of Arts and Sciences
- Młynek, Ludwik [in Polish] (1907), Narzecze wilamowickie [Wymysorys language] (in Polish), Tarnów: Nakładem Autora, Drukiem J Pisza
- Latosiński, Józef [in Polish] (1909). Monografia miasteczka Wilamowic: na podstawie źródeł autentycznych: z ilustracyami i mapką [Monograph of the town of Wilamowice: based on authentic sources: with illustrations and a map] (in Polish). Kraków: Drukarnia Literacka under the management of L. K. Górskiego.
- Kleczkowski, Adam [in Polish] (1920). Dialekt Wilamowic w zachodniej Galicji. Fonetyka i fleksja [The dialect of Wilamowice in western Galicia. Phonetics and inflection] (in Polish). Kraków: Polish Academy of Arts and Sciences.
- Kleczkowski, Adam [in Polish] (1921). Dialekt Wilamowic w zachodniej Galicji. Składnia [The dialect of Wilamowice in western Galicia. Syntax] (in Polish). Poznań: Adam Mickiewicz University in Poznań.
- Barciak, Antoni [in Polish], ed. (2001). Wilamowice: przyroda, historia, język, kultura, oraz społeczeństwo miasta i gminy [Wilamowice: nature, history, language, culture and society of the town and commune] (in Polish). Wilamowice: Urząd Gminy. ISBN 9788391588802.
