= Wilamowice =

Wilamowice Wymysoü (Wymysorys)
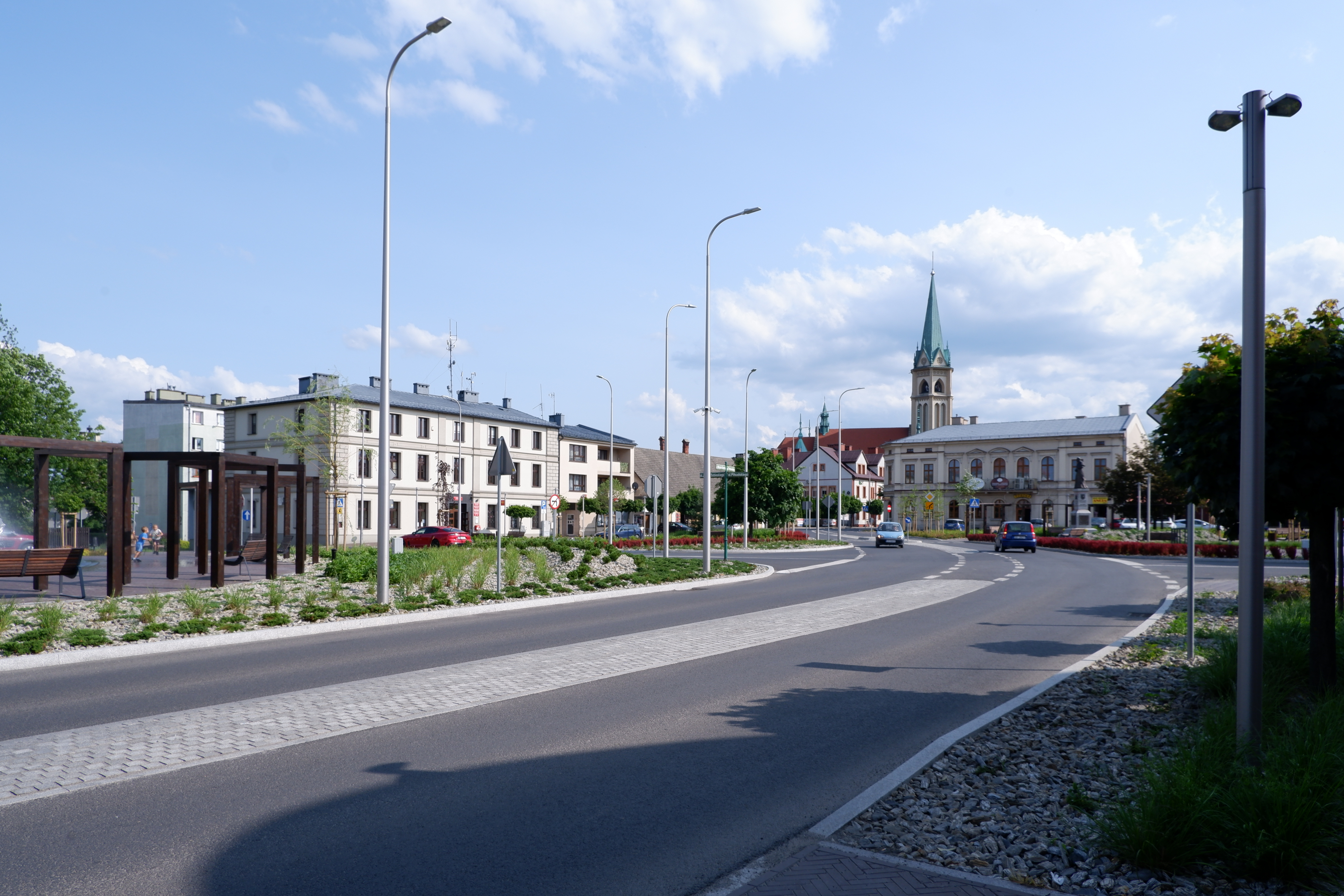
- Market Square

- Coat of arms

- Location within Poland
- Coordinates: 49°54′59″N 19°9′7″E
- Country: Poland
- Voivodeship: Silesian
- County: Bielsko
- Gmina: Wilamowice

Area
  - Total: 10.41 km^{2} (4.02 sq mi)

Population (2019-06-30)
  - Total: 3,100
  - Density: 300/km^{2} (770/sq mi)
- Time zone: UTC+1 (CET)
  - Summer (DST): UTC+2 (CEST)
- Postal code: 43-330
- Vehicle registration: SBI
- Website: https://gmina.wilamowice.pl/

Wilamowice (Polish: [vilamɔˈvit͡sɛ]; earlier Willamowice; Wymysorys: Wymysoü [ˈvɨmɨsɔy̯], German: Wilmesau; Silesian: Wilamowicy) is a town in southern Poland, situated in the Bielsko County, Silesian Voivodeship. The town is inhabited by a Germanic ethnic group of Vilamovians, who speak the highly endangered Wymysorys language.

== History ==
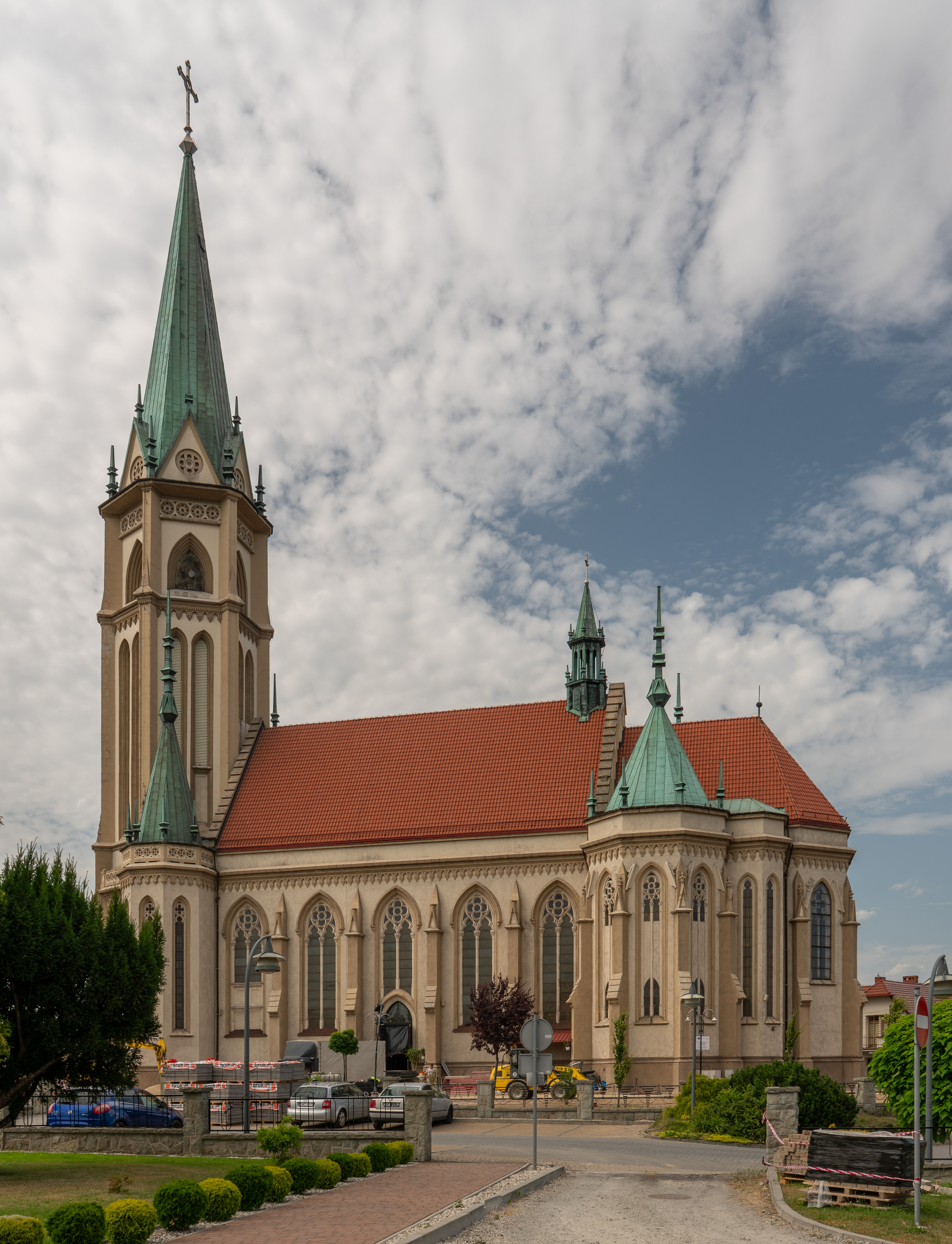
Holy Trinity Church

According to historians, after the desolation of Polish lands by the Mongol invasion in 1241, the then Silesian Piast rulers of the Duchy of Opole and Racibórz decided to bring settlers from the West to the deserted and destroyed lands around the Silesian Foothills, to revive agriculture, industry and trade. The area was settled in the course of the German eastward colonization of Slavic lands. In this way, around 1250, a group of colonists from the area of former Flanders came to the region, specifically from Friesland, near Bruges and established the settlement Wilamowice.

The settlement was first documented in 1325, in the Peter's Pence register as the parish Novovillamowicz (New-Wilamowice) in medieval Latin, among the Catholic parishes of Oświęcim diaconate, in the Diocese of Kraków. The place name is seen as a demarcation to the older settlement Antiquo-Willamowicz (Old-Wilamowice, today named Stara Wieś). In 1529, the two place names were recorded respectively in medieval Latin as Vilamovice Nova and Antiqua Vylamovicze.

In the course of history, the area has been part of several territorial border changes. Politically, both settlements—old and new, belonged to the Duchy of Opole and Racibórz, and the castellany gord of Oświęcim ceded from Lesser Poland around 1177 by duke Casimir II the Just to the duke of Opole—Mieszko I Tanglefoot, which in 1315 was formed in the process of the feudal fragmentation of Poland into the Duchy of Oświęcim, ruled by the local dukes of the Silesian Piast dynasty. In 1327, the Duchy of Oświęcim became a fiefdom of the Kingdom of Bohemia within the Holy Roman Empire.

In the 15th century, Jan Długosz lists the settlement in the diocese of Kraków benefactors register Liber beneficiorum dioecesis Cracoviensis in Old Polish language Wylamowycze, in allodial lordship of the nobleman Andreas of Wilamowic (aka Wilamowski) and the heirs Johannes and Nicolaus Wilamowski. From 1527, owners of the lordship mentioned include: the nobleman Jakob Saszowski of Gieraltowic and Wilamowic, and in 1533: the nobleman and chief judge of Oświęcim Nicolaus Saszowski of Gieraltowic (aka Gierałtowski), in 1633: Christopher Korycinski (castellan of Wojnicz), between 1707 and 1719 Władysław Morsztyn and his wife Helena née Kalinowska; to the end of the 19th century the owner Psarski sold his land and rights to residents, and from there on Wilamowice became a small rural town.

In 1457, duke Jan IV of Oświęcim agreed to sell the Duchy of Oświęcim to the Polish Crown, and in the accompanying document issued on 21 February the settlement was mentioned in Old Polish language Wylamowycze. It was not, however, until 1564, at the General sejm, that King Sigismund II Augustus issued privileges of incorporation, recognizing the Duchy of Oświęcim as part of the Polish Crown into the Silesian County of the Kraków Voivodeship.

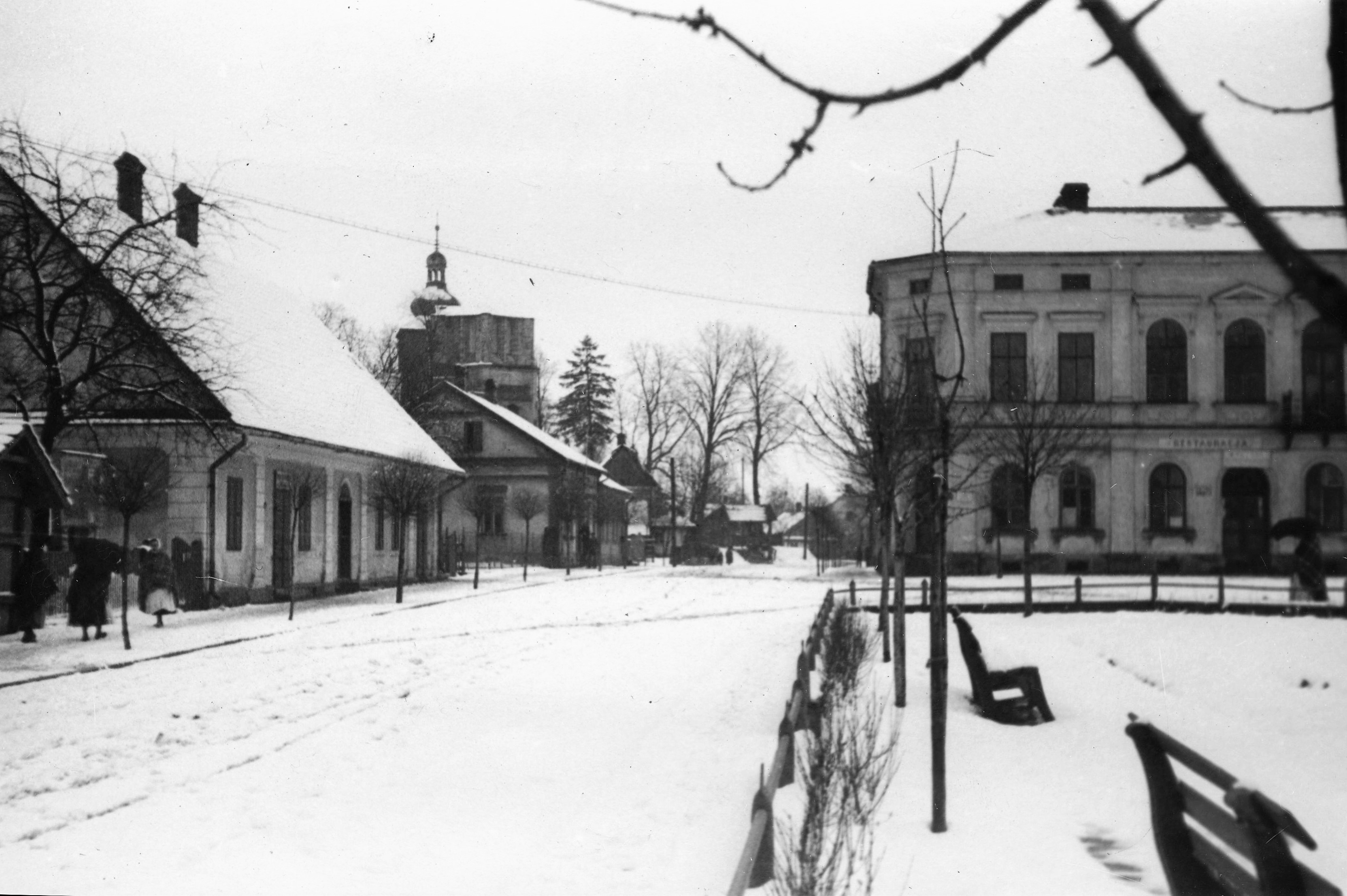
Wilamowice in 1935

Since the 15th century, the names used in official chronicles were the German versions Wilmeshau and Wilmesdorf for both the new and old Wilamowice respectively. The place name was subject to several vernacular changes over the course of history, and since the 18th century the name Wilmesau in High German prevailed under the ruling Habsburg monarchy; when in 1772, upon the First Partition of Poland, it became part of the Habsburg's Kingdom of Galicia and Lodomeria, a semi-autonomous protectorate of the Austrian Empire. After World War I and the dissolution of Austro-Hungarian monarchy, it became part of the newly independent nation of the Second Polish Republic. According to the 1921 census, Wilamowice had a population of 1,774, 97.6% Polish, 1.4% German and 1.0% Jewish by declared nationality.

In 1939, after the joint Invasion of Poland by Germany and the Soviet Union, the area was annexed by Germany (see Polish areas annexed by Nazi Germany) in the Occupation of Poland. After the end of the Second World War, Polish territories seized by the Red Army as it advanced westward, were restored to the post-war Polish People's Republic.

=== Archaic dialect ===
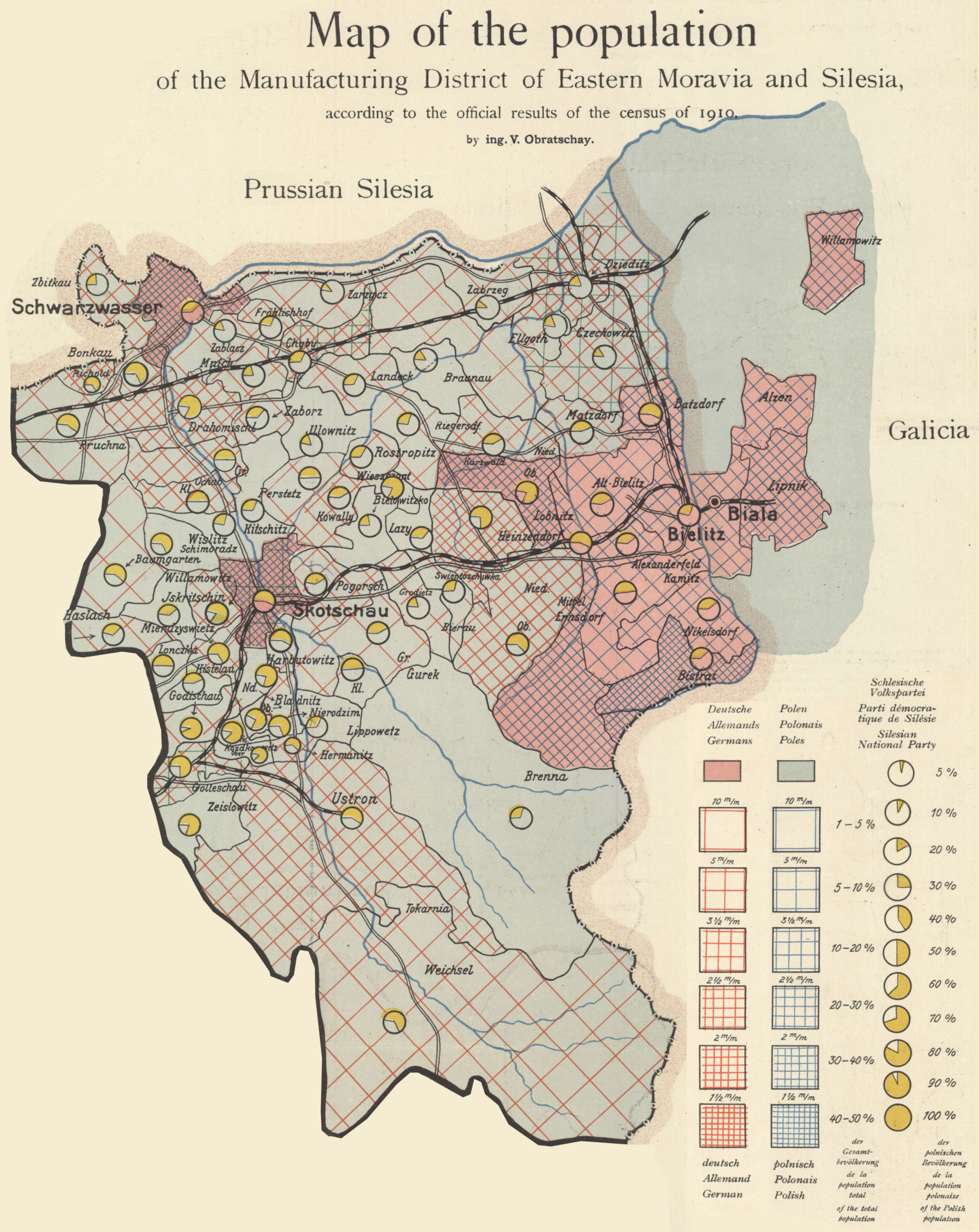
1910 census map identifying Wilamowice as a majority ethnic German settlement.

Due to endogamy and geographical isolation of the settlement in a Polish language region near the German linguistic enclave around Bielsko-Biała, Wilamowice formed an independent language or dialect (see: Wymysorys language) since the Late Medieval Period, which was in use in everyday life until the end of the Second World War. At the end of the War, whilst almost all Germans in the region were expelled (see Flight and expulsion of Germans from Poland during and after World War II), in Wilmesau—the ancestral population were able to remain. The local language, however, was banned in the Polish People's Republic under the Soviet Occupation Forces and Soviet-backed communist regime, and the local population were partially Polonized. Although the language ban was lifted in 1956 during the "Polish October" revolution, attempts continued to suppress the Wymysorys dialect from public life.

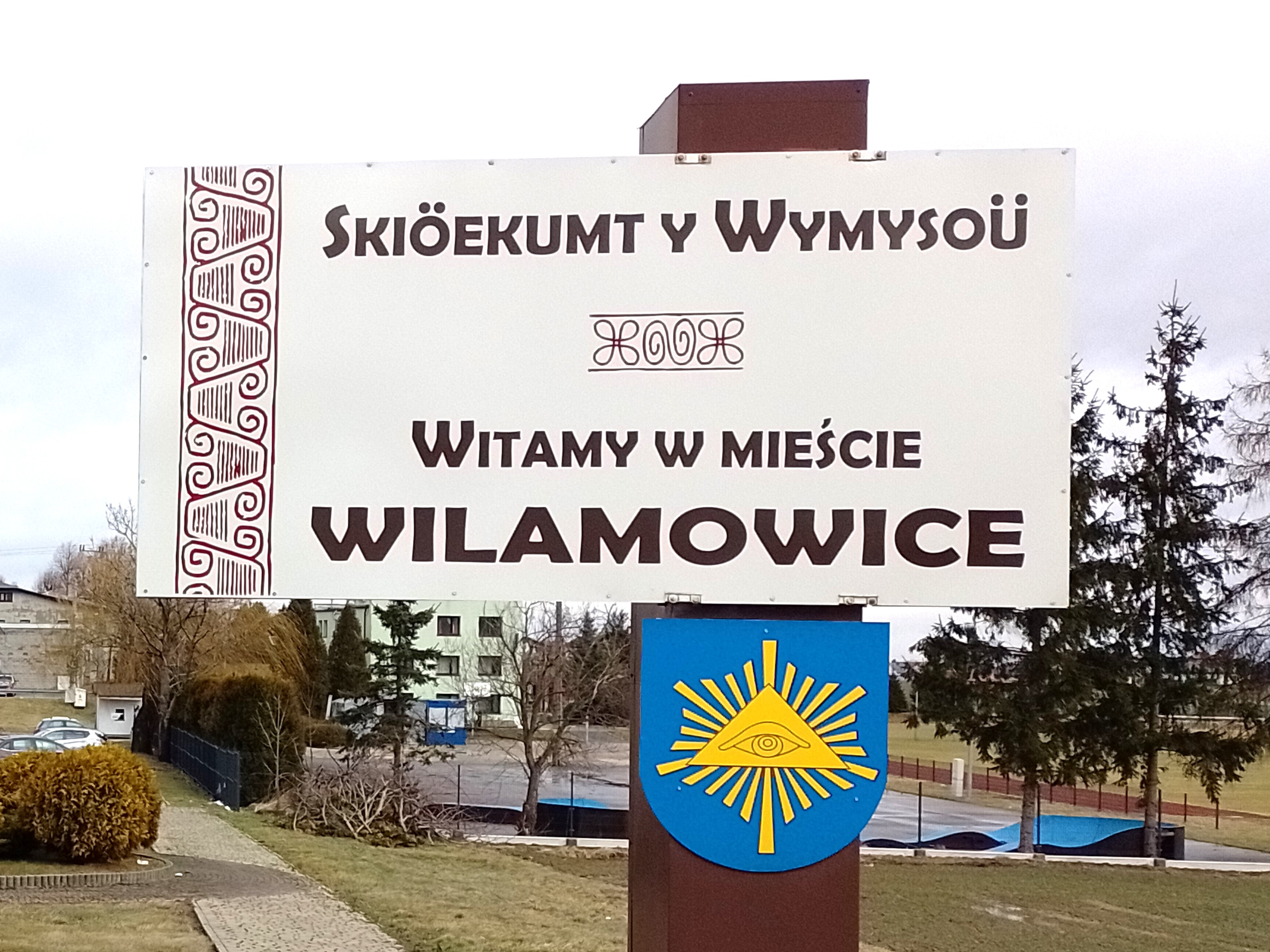
Welcome sign in Wymysorys and Polish

Today, the Wymysorys dialect is spoken by less than 70 native speaking residents—the elderly being the majority. The status of the Wilamowice ethnolect is complex, because according to the traditional classification it is broadly understood as an East Central dialect of High German. Nevertheless, based on the self-identification of its users as a separate group from the Germans and the existence of a literary Wymysorys language (or, to be more exact, micro-language), this ethnolect can be considered a separate language.

== Notable people ==
- Florian Biesik (1849–1926), writer
- Józef Bilczewski (1860–1923), archbishop of Lwów
- Józef Gara (1929–2013), former miner turned author and poet who was the creator of the modern alphabet of Wymysorys and a collector of Wymysorys songs

== Twin towns – sister cities ==
See twin towns of Gmina Wilamowice.
