= Józef Gara =

Miner and author of Wymysorys language

- Tołer-Jüza
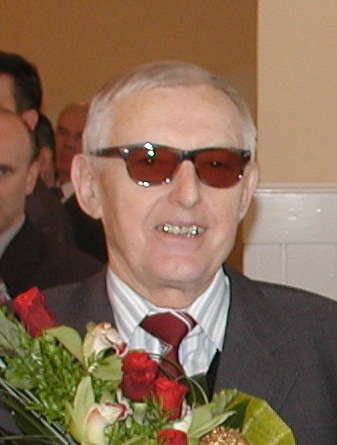
- Gara during an award ceremony in 2012
- Born: 29 January 1929
- Died: 10 July 2013 (aged 84)
- Resting place: Wilamowice
- Occupation: Miner
- Writing career
- Language: Wymysorys
- Period: Long twentieth century
- Genre: Poetry
- Subject: Folklore
- Notable work: Zbiór wierszy o wilamowskich obrzędach i obyczajach oraz słownik języka wilamowskiego
- Movement: Revivalism

Józef Gara (Wymysorys: Tołer-Jüza; 29 January 1929 – 10 July 2013) was a miner who spoke the endangered language of Wilamowice, Wymysorys, which had only 70 native speakers, and created the Wymysorys alphabet. He also wrote poetry in Wymysorys. In 2003 he published Zbiór wierszy oraz słownik języka wilamowskiego (transl. A collection of poems and the dictionary of Wymysorys language). In 2004 he collected old Wymysorys songs, corrected and extended the old ones with a view of releasing them. Between 2004 and 2006 he taught Wymysorys in a primary school in Wilamowice.

In 2010 Gara featured in the film The Mill and the Cross voicing the part of a Flemish character. He worked with Wikimedia Polska to produce a digital dictionary of Wymysorys, although the project was not completed due to his death.

== Works ==
- "Zbiór wierszy o wilamowskich obrzędach i obyczajach oraz słownik języka wilamowskiego" (A collection of poems and the dictionary of Vilamovian language), TIMEX printing house/Stowarzyszenie Na Rzecz Zachowania Dziedzictwa Kulturowego Miasta Wilamowice "Wilamowiane" (Association for the Conservation of Cultural Heritage of the City of Wilamowice "Wilamowiane"), Bielsko-Biała, 2004, ISBN 83-914917-8-1
- Kronika historyczna miasteczka Wilamowice (Historical chronicle of the town of Wilamowice), TIMEX printing house, Wilamowice, 2007
- "Wymysöjer śtytła": miasteczko Wilamowice oraz jego osobliwości zawarte w zbiorze piosenek wilamowskich Józefa Gary ("Wymysöjer śtytła: Wilamowice town and its sights set on a set of Vilamovian songs of Józef Gara), Wilamowice: Miejsko-Gminny Ośrodek Kultury (Municipal-Gmina Culture Center), 2007.

== Bibliography ==
- A documentary film about Wilamowice and Vilamovian language on YouTube (in Polish)
- Józef Gara's obituary (in Polish)
